= List of General Motors factories =

This is a list of General Motors factories that are being or have been used to produce automobiles and automobile components. The factories are occasionally idled for re-tooling.

== Current factories ==
| VIN | Name | City/State | Country | Products | Opened | Idled | Comments |
|---|---|---|---|---|---|---|---|
| R | Arlington Assembly | Arlington, Texas | United States | Chevrolet Tahoe; Chevrolet Suburban; GMC Yukon; GMC Yukon XL; Cadillac Escalade/Escalade ESV | 1954 | | Located at 2525 E Abram St. Expanded in 2018 with new building to the west to make body panels |
| | Bay City Powertrain | Bay City, Michigan | United States | Engine components | 1916 | | Located at 1001 Woodside Ave. Originally opened as National Cycle Manufacturing Co. in 1892 to make bicycles. Bought by Chevrolet in 1916 and joined GM along with Chevrolet in 1918. |
| | Bedford Casting | Bedford, Indiana | United States | Cylinder heads, cylinder blocks, transmission cases, drive unit housings, structural components | 1942 | | Located at 105 GM Drive. |
| 5 | Bowling Green Assembly Plant | Bowling Green, Kentucky | United States | Chevrolet Corvette (C8) LT4 V8 engine for: Chevrolet Corvette Z06 (C7) (2015-2016 models with Z07 package or build your own engine option, 2017-2019 all Z06 models), Chevrolet Camaro ZL1 (Gen 6) (phased in during 2020), Cadillac CT5-V Blackwing, and Cadillac Escalade-V; LT6 V8 engine | 1981 | | Located at 600 Corvette Drive. Performance Build Center relocated from Wixom, MI to Bowling Green Assembly in 2014. |
| | Brownstown Battery Assembly Plant | Brownstown Charter Township, Michigan | United States | Battery packs for GMC Hummer EV & Cadillac Lyriq; Roof module for Cruise AV; Assembles prototype battery packs | 2009 | | Located at 20001 Brownstown Center Dr. Battery packs for Chevrolet Volt, Holden Volt, Opel/Vauxhall Ampera, Cadillac ELR, Chevrolet Spark EV (2015-2016 only - LG Chem cells) |
| 6; 9 (BrightDrop) | CAMI Assembly | Ingersoll, Ontario | Canada | Chevrolet BrightDrop | 1989 | | Located at 300 Ingersoll St. S. Originally, a 50/50 joint venture with Suzuki until December 2009 when GM bought Suzuki's share. |
| | Defiance Foundry | Defiance, Ohio | United States | Aluminum engine blocks & heads | 1948 | | Located at 26427 State Route 281. Was part of GM's Central Foundry Division. Iron pouring ended in 2017. The plant now pours only aluminum blocks and heads. Defiance made the aluminum blocks and heads for the Buick 215 V8. Defiance has also supplied Toyota with 4-cylinder engine blocks and Nissan with V6 engine blocks. |
| U | Detroit/Hamtramck Assembly | Hamtramck, Michigan & Detroit, Michigan | United States | GMC Hummer EV; Chevrolet Silverado EV; GMC Sierra EV; Cadillac Escalade IQ; Assembles Ultium battery cells into modules and packs for a variety of vehicles | 1985 | | Also called "Poletown" and "Factory ZERO". Located at 2500 East Grand Blvd. |
| | DMAX Ltd. | Moraine, Ohio | United States | Duramax V8 engine | 2000 | | Located on 3100 Dryden Rd. |
| | DMAX Ltd. Components Plant | Brookville, Ohio | United States | Machined engine components for Duramax V8 engine | 2021 | | Located at 101 W. Campus Blvd. |
| | GM Egypt | 6th of October City | Egypt | Chevrolet N-Series; Chevrolet T-Series; Chevrolet Optra; Chevrolet Move | 1985 | | |
| F | Fairfax II | Kansas City, Kansas | United States | Chevrolet Bolt; Chevrolet Bolt EUV | 1987 | | Located at 3201 Fairfax Trafficway. Replaced original Fairfax Assembly Plant (Fairfax I) for 1988 model year production. |
| | Flint Engine South | Flint, Michigan | United States | 1.5 Turbo I4 (Malibu), 3.0 Duramax I6 engine | 2000 | | Located at 2100 Bristol Road. Located just to the south of Flint Truck Assembly and on the east side of Flint Metal Center. |
| | Flint Metal Center | Flint, Michigan | United States | Sheetmetal stampings for various GM models | 1954 | | Located at G-2238 Bristol Road. Located just to the south of Flint Truck Assembly and on the west side of Flint Engine South. Metal fabricating plant. |
| | Flint Tool & Die (North American Engineering and Tooling Center) | Flint, Michigan | United States | Tools & Dies for fabrication & assembly of sheetmetal body parts | 1967 | | Located at 425 Stevenson St. Was Plant 38 of the "Chevy in the Hole" complex. |
| F | Flint Truck Assembly | Flint, Michigan | United States | Chevrolet Silverado; GMC Sierra | 1947 | | Located at G 3100 Van Slyke Road. GM's oldest assembly plant in North America. |
| Z | Fort Wayne Assembly | Roanoke, Indiana | United States | Chevrolet Silverado; GMC Sierra | 1986 | | Located at 12200 Lafayette Center Rd. |
| | Grand Rapids Operations | Wyoming, Michigan | United States | Valvetrain products Axles for full-size trucks | 1943 | | Located at 2100 Burlingame Avenue SW. Originally established as Diesel Equipment Division of GM. Transferred to Delphi Automotive Systems in 1999 (Delphi Powertrain Systems Grand Rapids); taken back under Delphi Corporation bankruptcy and renamed General Motors Components Holdings in 1999. |
| | Gravatai Automotive Industrial Complex | Gravatai, Rio Grande do Sul | Brazil | Chevrolet Onix | 2000 | | Past models: Chevrolet Celta; Chevrolet Prisma; Suzuki Fun |
| | Joinville | Joinville, Santa Catarina | Brazil | 1.0 & 1.0 Turbo 3-cylinder engine 1.2 & 1.2 Turbo 3-cylinder engine | 2013 | | Past engines: 1.0L & 1.4L SPE / 4; 4-cylinder engines |
| | Kokomo Operations | Kokomo, Indiana | United States | Automotive Electronic Components including Powertrain and Body Control Modules | 1936 | | Located at 2603 South Goyer Rd. Originally established as Delco Electronics Corp., a GM subsidiary. Home of Delco automotive radio production. Transferred to Delphi Automotive Systems in 1999 (Delco Electronics and Safety); taken back under Delphi Corporation bankruptcy and renamed General Motors Components Holdings in 2009. |
| | GM Korea | Boryeong | South Korea | Automatic Transmissions | 1996 | | GM 6T40 transmission (GF6) |
| B | GM Korea | Bupyeong-gu, Incheon | South Korea | Chevrolet Trailblazer; Buick Encore GX; Buick Envista Engines: GM Family 0 engine 1.3L Turbo 3-cylinder engine | 1962; 1971 (engine plant) | | Bupyeong has 2 vehicle assembly plants and a powertrain plant. The Bupyeong 2 Assembly Plant ended production on November 26, 2022. Bupyeong 2 was last producing the Chevrolet Malibu and Trax and Buick Encore. |
| C | GM Korea | Changwon, Gyeongsang | South Korea | Chevrolet Trax; GM small gasoline engine LV7, LE2; Manual transmissions | 1991 | | |
| J | Lansing Delta Township Assembly | Delta Township, Michigan | United States | Chevrolet Traverse; GMC Acadia; Buick Enclave | 2006 | | Located at 8175 Millett Hwy. |
| 0 | Lansing Grand River Assembly/Stamping | Lansing, Michigan | United States | Cadillac CT4 (2020); Cadillac CT5 (2020) | 2001 | | Located at 920 Townsend Street. Stamping plant added in 2016. |
| | Lansing Regional Stamping (LRS) | Delta Township, Michigan | United States | | 2004 | | Located within the Lansing Delta Assembly complex. |
| | Lansing Service Parts Operation (SPO) | Delta Township, Michigan | United States | | 1960 | | Located at 4400 West Mount Hope Road. Previously Lansing Plant 4. Now called Lansing Redistribution Center, part of GM Customer Care and Aftersales. |
| | Lockport Operations | Lockport, NY | United States | Thermal products (climate control systems, powertrain cooling systems) and stators for EV motors. | 1914 | | Located at 200 Upper Mountain Road. Founded in 1910 as the Harrison Radiator Company. Acquired by United Motors in 1916 which was then acquired by GM in 1918. Transferred to Delphi Automotive Systems in 1999 (Harrison Thermal Systems); taken back under Delphi Corporation bankruptcy and renamed General Motors Components Holdings in 2009. |
| | Marion Metal Center | Marion, Indiana | United States | Sheetmetal stamped parts & blanks for various GM models | 1956 | | Located at 2400 West Second St. Metal fabricating. Originally a Fisher Body division plant. |
| | Mogi das Cruzes | Mogi das Cruzes, São Paulo state | Brazil | Stampings for new & replacement parts | 1999 | | Stamping plant |
| 4 | Orion Assembly | Orion Township, Michigan | United States | Chevrolet Silverado EV; GMC Sierra EV | 1983 | 2009; reopened 2011 | Located at 4555 Giddings Road. |
| 1 (Line 2)/ 9 (Line 1) | Oshawa Car Assembly | Oshawa, Ontario | Canada | Chevrolet Silverado 1500; Chevrolet Silverado HD | 1953 | | Located at 900 Park Rd South. |
| | Oshawa Metal | Oshawa, Ontario | Canada | Stamped metal parts for new production and for service parts | 1986 | | Part of the overall Oshawa Assembly complex (Autoplex) on Park Road South. Located at 1000 Park Road South. |
| | Parma Metal Center | Parma, Ohio | United States | Sheetmetal stampings & assemblies for various GM models | 1948 | | Located at 5400 Chevrolet Blvd. Metal fabricating |
| | Pontiac Metal Center | Pontiac, Michigan | United States | Sheetmetal stampings for various GM models | 1926 | | Located at 260 E. Beverly Ave. Metal fabricating Originally, a Cartercar plant and then an Oakland plant. |
| S | Ramos Arizpe Assembly | Ramos Arizpe | Mexico | Cadillac Optiq; Chevrolet Blazer; Chevrolet Equinox | 1981 | | Stamping plant added in 1995 and a paint plant added in 1997. |
| | Ramos Arizpe Engine | Ramos Arizpe | Mexico | 1.2L Turbo 3-cylinder engine Gen V Small Block V8 & V6 | 1982 | | Past engines: General Motors 60° V6 engine GM High Value V6; GM High Feature V6 |
| | Ramos Arizpe Transmission | Ramos Arizpe | Mexico | VT40 (CVT250) CVT transmission | 1999 | | Past transmissions: 4L60-E/4L65-E 4-speed automatic 6T70/6T75 6-speed automatic (GF6); 4ET50 EVT (for Chevrolet Volt); 4ET55 EVT (for Cadillac ELR) |
| | Rochester Operations | Rochester, NY | United States | Chevrolet, GMC, Cadillac, and Buick Components - Engine management systems, fuel injection systems, and related products. | 1939 | | Located at 1000 Lexington Avenue. Founded in 1908 as the Rochester Coil Company. Acquired by GM in 1929. Became the Rochester Products Division of GM. Transferred to Delphi Automotive Systems in 1999 (Rochester Powertrain); taken back under Delphi Corporation bankruptcy and renamed General Motors Components Holdings in 2009. |
| | Romulus Engine | Romulus, Michigan | United States | HFV6 Gen4 V6 | 1976 | | Located at 36880 Ecorse Road. Originally part of GM's Detroit Diesel Allison Division where it built diesel engines and components. Switched to gasoline engines in the 1980s. |
| | Romulus Transmission | Romulus, Michigan | United States | 10L80/90 Transmission | 1995 | | Located at 36880 Ecorse Road. Past transmissions: GM 4L60-E transmission |
| | Rosario | Alvear, Rosario Department, Santa Fe Province | Argentina | Chevrolet Cruze; Chevrolet Tracker Engines: 1.4L Turbo I4 LE2 | 1997 | | Engine plant added in 2016. Past Models: Chevrolet Corsa C, Chevrolet Corsa B/Corsa Classic/Classic, Chevrolet Agile and Suzuki Grand Vitara/Chevrolet Tracker |
| | Saginaw Metal Casting Operations | Saginaw, Michigan | United States | Metal casting for powertrains (High Feature V6 engine): engine blocks, heads, and crankshafts Front 4WD axle assembly castings | 1919 | | Located at 1629 N. Washington Avenue. |
| L | San Luis Potosí Assembly | San Luis Potosí | Mexico | Chevrolet Equinox; GMC Terrain | 2008 | | |
| | San Luis Potosí Transmission | San Luis Potosí | Mexico | FWD GF9 9 Speed Transmissions | 2009 | | GM-Ford 6-speed automatic transmission 6T40/45 (GF6) |
| | São Caetano do Sul Assembly | São Caetano do Sul, São Paulo | Brazil | Chevrolet Montana; Chevrolet Spin; Chevrolet Tracker | 1930 | | |
| | São José dos Campos Assembly | São José dos Campos, São Paulo | Brazil | Chevrolet S-10; Chevrolet Trailblazer Engines including: Chevrolet Jobmaster 261 I6, Chevrolet 153 4-cylinder, Chevrolet Turbo-Thrift engine, GM Family 1 engine, GM Family II engine Detroit Diesel Series 53; Transmissions | 1959 | | |
| G | Silao Assembly | Silao | Mexico | Chevrolet Silverado; GMC Sierra | 1994 | | Stamping plant added in 1997. Full-size SUV production moved entirely to Arlington Assembly after the 2009 model year; Past production models: Cadillac Escalade ESV, Cadillac Escalade EXT, Chevrolet Avalanche, Chevrolet Suburban, GMC Suburban, GMC Yukon XL |
| | Silao Engine | Silao | Mexico | Gen V Small Block V8 | 2001 | | Gen IV Small Block V8 |
| | Silao Transmission | Silao | Mexico | 8L45, 8L90, 10L80 | 2008 | | GM 6L50 transmission, 6L80/90 |
| Z, S (Traverse & Vue) | Spring Hill Manufacturing | Spring Hill, Tennessee | United States | Cadillac XT5; Cadillac XT6; Cadillac Lyriq 1.5L Turbo I4; Ecotec Gen III 2.0L Turbo I4; 2.7L L3B turbo I4; 5.3 & 6.2 Gen V Small-Block V8 Engine Stamping; Components | 1990 | 2009-2012 | Located at 100 Saturn Parkway. |
| | St. Catharines Propulsion Plant | St. Catharines, Ontario | Canada | Gen V Small Block V8; High Feature V6 engine Tremec TR-9080 8-speed dual clutch transmission Engine components | 1954 | | Located at 570 Glendale Avenue. |
| | Toledo Transmission | Toledo, Ohio | United States | RWD GM-Allison 10-speed (10L1000) (AB1V) / 8-speed (8L45 & 8L90) / 6-Speed (6L45/6L50 & 6L80/6L90) Transmissions / FWD GF9 9 Speed Transmissions | 1956 | | Located at 1455 West Alexis Road. Acquired from the former Martin-Parry Corporation in 1955. Replaced the older Toledo plant on Central Ave. |
| | Toluca Engine | Toluca, State of Mexico | Mexico | 1.4L/1.5L SGE I4 Vortec 3000 Marine & Industrial 4-cyl. engine 5.0 & 5.7 Marine & Industrial V8 engines Small-block V8 engines for the aftermarket Aluminum Foundry | 1965 | | Past engines: GM Family 1 engine |
| | Tonawanda Engine | Buffalo, New York | United States | LV1 4.3 L V6; L84 5.3 L V8; L87 6.2 L V8; LT1 6.2 L V8; LT2 6.2 L V8; L8T 6.6 L V8 | 1937 | | Located at 2995 River Rd. Includes 3 plants. Plant #1 opened in 1938. Plant #4 opened in 1941. Plant #5 opened in 2001. |
| | Ultium Cells LLC - Warren | Warren, Ohio | United States | Ultium lithium-ion battery cells for EV's | 2022 | | Owned by Ultium Cells LLC, a 50/50 joint venture between General Motors and LG Energy Solution. This is Ultium Cells' first plant. Located at 7400 Tod Ave SW. |
| 1 | Wentzville Assembly | Wentzville, Missouri | United States | Chevrolet Express; GMC Savana; Chevrolet Colorado; GMC Canyon | 1983 | | Located at 1500 East Route A. |
| | SAIC-GM | Jinqiao, Pudong district, Shanghai | China | Cadillac CT4; Cadillac CT5; Cadillac CT6; Cadillac Lyriq; Cadillac XT4; Cadillac XT5; Cadillac XT6; Chevrolet Blazer; Chevrolet Malibu XL; Buick Enclave; Buick GL8 ES/Avenir (Mk III); Buick GL8 Century (Mk IV); Buick LaCrosse; Buick Regal (E2XX); Buick Velite 7 Engines; Engine components Transmissions; Ultium batteries | 1998 | | Operated by SAIC-GM. There are 3 vehicle production plants (North, South, & East). North was the original plant. South began production in 2005. The East or "Cadillac" plant began production in 2016. |
| | SAIC-GM Dongyue Motors | Yantai, Shandong | China | Chevrolet Aveo (Mex.); Chevrolet Onix; Chevrolet Orlando; Chevrolet Trailblazer; Buick Encore GX; Buick Envision; Buick Excelle | 2001 | | Operated by SAIC-GM. Originally founded in 2001 as Yantai Bodyshop Corp. which built Daewoo vehicles (Daewoo Lanos) under license from Daewoo Motor Co. SAIC-GM took over the plant in 2002. There are two vehicle production plants, North and South. SAIC-GM Dongyue Motors joint venture is owned 50% by SAIC-GM, 25% by GM China, & 25% by SAIC. |
| | SAIC-GM Dongyue Powertrain | Yantai, Shandong | China | Engines; Transmissions including: 6T30/6T40/6T45/6T50, CVT | 1999 | | Operated by SAIC-GM. Originally founded in 1999 as Shandong Daewoo Automotive Engine Co., Ltd., a 50/50 joint venture between Daewoo Motor Co. & Chinese partners owned by the Shandong provincial govt. SAIC-GM took over the plant in 2005. SAIC-GM Dongyue Powertrain joint venture is owned 50% by SAIC-GM, 25% by GM China, & 25% by SAIC. Past Engines: Family I, Gen 3 engine |
| | SAIC-GM Norsom Motors | Shenyang, Liaoning | China | Chevrolet Tracker; Buick Encore; Buick GL8 Legacy (Mk II) (2010-present); Engines | 1992 | | Operated by SAIC-GM. Originally founded in 1992 as Jinbei GM Automotive Co. Ltd., a 30/70 joint venture between GM & Shenyang Jinbei Automotive. Restructured into a 50/50 joint venture between GM & Jinbei in 1998. SAIC-GM took over the joint venture in 2004, buying out Jinbei. The new SAIC-GM Norsom Motors joint venture is owned 50% by SAIC-GM, 25% by GM China, & 25% by SAIC. |
| | SAIC-GM Wuhan Branch | Wuhan, Hubei | China | Chevrolet Equinox; Chevrolet Monza; Chevrolet Menlo; Buick Excelle GT/GX; Buick Verano Pro; Buick GL6; Buick Velite 6 Buick Electra E5; Engines | 2015 | | Operated by SAIC-GM. Past models: Chevrolet Cavalier |
| | SAIC-GM-Wuling (HQ plant) | Liuzhou, Guangxi Zhuang Autonomous Region | China | Wuling models Engines | 1982 | | There are two vehicle production plants, East and West. |
| | SAIC-GM-Wuling Baojun Base | Liudong New District, Liuzhou, Guangxi Zhuang Autonomous Region | China | Baojun models Engines | 2012 | | |
| | SAIC-GM-Wuling Chongqing Branch | Chongqing | China | Wuling models Engines | 2014 | | |
| | SAIC-GM-Wuling Qingdao Branch | Qingdao, Shandong | China | Wuling models Engines | 2000 | | Operated by SAIC-GM-Wuling. Originally founded in 1997 as Etsong Vehicle Manufacturing. SAIC-GM-Wuling took over the plant in 2005. |
| | SGMW Motor Indonesia | Cikarang, Bekasi Regency, West Java | Indonesia | MG4 EV; MGS5 EV; MGS6 EV; MG ZS; Wuling Air EV; Wuling Aira EV; Wuling Alvez; Wuling Binguo EV; Wuling Cloud EV; Wuling Confero; Wuling Darion; Wuling Eksion; Wuling Formo; Wuling Mitra EV | 2017 | | 100% owned and operated by SAIC-GM-Wuling. Since 2011, SAIC-GM-Wuling is owned 50.1% by SAIC, 44% by GM China, & 5.9% by Liuzhou Wuling Automobile Industry Co., Ltd. Past models: Chevrolet Captiva |

== Sold/co-operated factories ==
| VIN | Name | City/State | Country | Products | Opened | Idled | Comments |
|---|---|---|---|---|---|---|---|
| H | AM General Commercial plant | Mishawaka, Indiana | United States | Hummer H2 | 2002 | 2009 | Located at 12900 McKinley Highway. Built under contract to GM by AM General. |
| E | AM General Military plant | Mishawaka, Indiana | United States | Hummer H1 | 1992 | 2006 | Located at 13200 McKinley Highway. Built under contract to GM by AM General. |
| | Associated Motor Industries Ltd. | Jurong (Jurong Industrial Estate) | Singapore | Chevrolet Impala; Chevrolet 350; Vauxhall including: Victor; Viva; VX4/90 | 1968 | 1975 | Jointly owned by Wearne Brothers Limited & Motor Investments Bhd. Associated Motor Industries Ltd. assembled vehicles under license from GM beginning in 1968 as well as brands from other automakers (Austin, Morris, & Renault). |
| | Associated Motor Industries Malaysia Sdn. Bhd. | Batu Tiga, Selangor | Malaysia | Holden | 1968 | 1971 (?) | Associated Motor Industries Malaysia assembled Holden vehicles under license from GM beginning in 1968 as well as brands from other automakers. |
| C | Automobilwerk Eisenach (AWE) | Eisenach | Germany | Opel Vectra A | 1990 | 1991 | The old Wartburg plant built vehicles for Opel for a short time before closing permanently. |
| | Avtotor | Kaliningrad | Russia | Chevrolet Aveo, Chevrolet Captiva, Chevrolet Epica, Chevrolet Lacetti, Chevrolet Malibu, Chevrolet Orlando, Chevrolet Rezzo, Chevrolet Tahoe, Chevrolet Trailblazer, Cadillac BLS, Cadillac CTS, Cadillac Escalade, Cadillac SRX, Cadillac STS, Hummer H2, Hummer H3, Opel Antara, Opel Astra, Opel Insignia, Opel Mokka, Opel Meriva, Opel Zafira | 2004 | 2015 | Built under contract by Avtotor for GM. GM ended the contract in 2015. |
| | Aymesa | Quito | Ecuador | | 1973 | 1999 (Last GM production) | First automotive assembler in Ecuador. GM bought 36.95% of AYMESA in 1982 & increased its stake to 45.9% in 1984. GM sold off its stake in 1999. |
| | Azermash CP LLC | Hajiqabul | Azerbaijan | Chevrolet Cobalt, Chevrolet Lacetti, Chevrolet Malibu, Chevrolet Nexia (T250), Chevrolet Tracker, Chevrolet Damas/Labo | 2017 | | Built under contract by Azermash CP LLC for GM & UzAuto Motors. |
| | Azia Avto | Ust-Kamenogorsk | Kazakhstan | Chevrolet Aveo, Chevrolet Captiva, Chevrolet Cruze, Chevrolet Epica, Chevrolet Lacetti, Chevrolet Malibu, Chevrolet Orlando, Chevrolet Tracker | 2007 | 2018 | Built under contract by Azia Avto for GM. |
| | Bangchan General Assembly Co., Ltd. | Khan Na Yao district, Bangkok | Thailand | Opel Kadett; Opel Rekord; Holden Monaro LS; Chevrolet De Ville | 1970 | 1987 (?) | Isuzu invested in Bangchan in 1979 but then sold its stake to Honda in 1987. Phra Nakorn Automobile Group became sole owner of Bangchan in 2005. |
| B | Gruppo Bertone | Grugliasco | Italy | Opel Kadett E convertible Opel Astra F convertible Opel Astra G coupe & convertible | 1987 | 2006 | Built under contract by Gruppo Bertone for Opel/Vauxhall. |
| | Centroamericana de Ensamblaje y Fabricación | (?) | Honduras | Compadre | 1970s | (?) | A version of GM's BTV called the Compadre was assembled in Honduras. |
| | Champion Motors | Shah Alam, Selangor | Malaysia | Chevrolet Impala; Vauxhall Victor; Vauxhall Viva; Bedford trucks including Bedford TJ | 1968 | 1982 (?) | Champion Motors assembled vehicles under license from GM beginning in 1968. Champion Motors was renamed Assembly Services Sdn. Bhd. (ASSB) in 1975. The last products still being built for GM were Bedford trucks. A joint venture of Toyota & UMW called Sejati Motor took over ASSB in 1982 which was then renamed UMW Toyota Motor in 1987. |
| | Chinese Automobile Co., Ltd. | Xinzhuang District, New Taipei City | Taiwan | Opel Astra F & G Opel Vectra B | 1993 | 2000 | GM ended the assembly contract in 2001. |
| | ELAZ-GM | Yelabuga, Tatarstan | Russia | Chevrolet Blazer | 1996 | 2001 | GM owned about 25% & ELAZ owned the other 75%. Joint venture dissolved in 2001. |
| | Fábrica Superior de Centroamérica, S.A. | (?) | El Salvador | GM Cherito | 1970s | (?) | A version of GM's BTV called the Cherito was assembled in El Salvador. |
| P | FSO | Warsaw | Poland | Opel Astra; Opel Vectra | 1994 | 2000 | Built by an FSO - GM joint venture operating out of a converted old FSO warehouse. |
| | FSO | Warsaw | Poland | Chevrolet Aveo | 2007 | 2011 | Built by FSO for GM as part of a joint venture between UkrAvto (parent of FSO) & GM. Ukravto owned 60% & GM Daewoo owned 40%. The production license ended in 2011 & was not renewed. |
| | GAZ | Nizhny Novgorod | Russia | Chevrolet Aveo | 2013 | 2015 | Built under contract by GAZ for GM. GM ended the contract in 2015. |
| | General Assembly Corp. | Havana | Cuba | Opel Olympia Rekord | 1950s | (?) | General Assembly Corp. (a local distributor in Cuba) started assembling Opel Olympia Rekord CKD kits manufactured in Germany in the 1950s. |
| | Genoto (General Otomotiv Sanayi ve Ticaret AS) | Kozyatağı, Istanbul | Turkey | Bedford trucks including Bedford TK (KG EJR & KBC 10 & 570) | 1965 | 1986 | Built Bedford trucks under license from GM, sometimes rebadged as Genoto. |
| | Ghandhara Industries | Karachi, Sindh | Pakistan | Chevrolet; Vauxhall; Bedford trucks and buses including Bedford TJ; Holden | 1953 | 1970s | Originally a GM owned plant (General Motors Overseas Distribution Corporation). Sold to Ghandhara Industries Ltd. in 1963. Nationalized in 1972, it then became National Motors Ltd. Privatized to the Bibojee Group in 1992 who reverted to the previous name, Ghandhara Industries. |
| | GM-Auto | Saint-Petersburg | Russia | Chevrolet Cruze; Opel Astra; Chevrolet Trailblazer; Chevrolet Captiva; Opel Antara | 2007 | 2015 | Includes operations at the temporary "Arsenal plant" & the permanent plant in Shushary. GM ceased most operations in Russia back in 2015 and the GM-Auto plant closed. Sold to Hyundai Motor in 2020. |
| | GM-AvtoVAZ | Tolyatti | Russia | Chevrolet Niva; Chevrolet Viva | 2002 | 2019 | Was originally owned 41.5% by GM, 41.5% by AvtoVAZ, & 17% by EBRD. In 2012, EBRD was bought out & GM-AvtoVAZ became 50/50 owned by GM & AvtoVAZ. The GM-AvtoVAZ joint venture was dissolved in 2019 when AvtoVAZ bought out GM. |
| 4 | GM España S.A. | Zaragoza | Spain | Opel/Vauxhall Corsa A, B, C, D, E (5 door, van); Opel/Vauxhall Meriva A, B Opel/Vauxhall/Holden Combo C Opel/Vauxhall Tigra A Vauxhall Nova | 1982 | 2017 | Opel plant. Sold to PSA Group in 2017. |
| | GM Malaysia Sdn. Bhd. | Tampoi, Johor | Malaysia | Opel Ascona; Opel Commodore; Opel Gemini; Opel Kadett; Opel Manta; Opel Rekord; Bedford Harimau; Holden | 1968 | 1982 | Originally Capital Motor Assembly, which assembled Opel models under license from GM beginning in 1968. These license built models include: Opel Commodore A, Opel Kadett B, Opel Rekord C, & components. Capital Motor also assembled cars for Honda and Datsun (Nissan). GM bought Capital Motor Assembly in 1971 and renamed it GM Malaysia. Government policies forced GM to sell GM Malaysia to Oriental Holdings in 1980 which then renamed the unit Oriental Assemblers. Assembly of GM vehicles ended in 1982. |
| | GM Philippines, Inc. | Paco district, Manila | Philippines | | 1953 | 1985 | Originally Yutivo Sons Hardware Co. Yutivo assembled various models under license from GM beginning in 1953. GM bought a 49% stake in Yutivo in 1972 and renamed it GM Philippines. Isuzu invested in the company in 1979 and it was renamed GM Pilipinas, Inc. Assembly of GM vehicles ended in 1985 and GM sold the plant to Isuzu in 1994. Isuzu closed this plant and company in 1995. |
| G | GM Manufacturing Poland Sp. z o.o. | Gliwice | Poland | Opel models | 1998 | 2019 | Opel plant. Sold to PSA Group in 2017; continued to supply the Buick Cascada to GM through 2019. |
| | GM Powertrain Poland | Tychy | Poland | Diesel engines including the Isuzu Circle L engine | 1999 | 2017 | Opel plant. Originally founded as Isuzu Motors Polska (ISPOL) in 1996. GM bought 60% in 2002 & the remaining 40% in 2013. Sold to PSA Group along with Opel in 2017. |
| | GM Uzbekistan/UzAuto Motors | Asaka, Andijan Region | Uzbekistan | Chevrolet Cobalt, Chevrolet Lacetti, Chevrolet Nexia 3, Chevrolet Spark (M300), Chevrolet Tracker (2022-) | 1996 | | Originally established as Uz-DaewooAuto, a 50/50 joint venture between Daewoo Motor & the Uzbek government. Became GM Uzbekistan, a 25/75 joint venture between GM & state owned UzAvtosanoat in 2008. GM was bought out by the UzAvto in 2018 & the company was renamed UzAuto Motors. Vehicles now built under license by UzAuto Motors from GM. |
| | GM Uzbekistan/UzAuto Motors | Pitnak, Khorezm Region | Uzbekistan | ??? | 2014 | | |
| | GM Uzbekistan/UzAuto Motors | Tashkent | Uzbekistan | ??? | 2009 | | |
| | GM Powertrain Uzbekistan/UzAuto Motors Powertrain | Tashkent | Uzbekistan | 1.2 L & 1.5 L DOHC I4 engines 1.2 L 3-cylinder engine Engine components Foundry | 2011 | | GM Powertrain Uzbekistan was a 52/48 joint venture between GM & state owned UzAvtosanoat. UzAvto bought out GM in 2019 and the company was renamed UzAvto Motors Powertrain. |
| E | Heuliez | Cerizay | France | Opel/Vauxhall Tigra TwinTop B Holden Tigra | 2004 | 2009 | Built under contract by Heuliez for Opel/Vauxhall. |
| | Hindustan Motors | Uttarpara, West Bengal | India | Vauxhall models under Hindustan name including Hindustan Contessa; Bedford models including Bedford TJ; Allison Transmission; Terex | 1957 (?) | 2004 | Built under license by Hindustan Motors. |
| V | IBC Vehicles/GMM Luton | Luton | United Kingdom | Bedford and Vauxhall vehicles | 1950 (as AA Block of Luton plant) | 2017 | Vauxhall plant. Sold to PSA Group in 2017. |
| | IDA-Opel | Kikinda, Socialist Republic of Serbia | Yugoslavia | Opel Ascona C Opel Corsa A Opel Kadett D & E Opel Kikinda (Senator A); Opel Omega A Opel Rekord E Opel Vectra A | 1977 | 1992 | Opel affiliate. A joint venture owned 49% by GM & 51% by Kikinda Iron Foundry. Ended by the wars of the breakup of Yugoslavia. |
| | INDEVESA, S.A. | (?) | Nicaragua | Pinolero | 1970s | (?) | The Nicaraguan state-owned company produced a version of GM's BTV called the Pinolero. |
| | Industrias Superior | (?) | Guatemala | GM Chato | 1970s | (?) | A version of GM's BTV called the Chato was assembled in Guatemala. |
| 7,8 | Isuzu Fujisawa plant | Fujisawa, Kanagawa | Japan | Buick Opel; Chevrolet LUV; Chevrolet Spectrum; Chevrolet W-Series; Geo Spectrum; Geo Storm; GMC W-Series; Chevrolet Low Cab Forward 4500 & 5500 diesel Isuzu F-Series; Isuzu I-Mark; Isuzu Impulse; Isuzu N-Series; Isuzu Stylus | 1961 | | Isuzu manufacturing facility |
| 3 | Isuzu Kawasaki plant | Kawasaki, Kanagawa | Japan | Isuzu F-Series | 1938 | | Isuzu plant |
| 9 | KUKA | Livonia, Michigan | United States | BrightDrop Zevo 600 | 2021 | 2022 | Produced under contract for GM in a limited run of less than 500 units. A temporary measure until GM's CAMI plant is ready to start building BrightDrop electric vans. |
| H (Lotus); N (Speedster & VX220) | Lotus Cars | RAF Hethel | United Kingdom | Opel Speedster/Vauxhall VX220; Opel Lotus Omega A / Vauxhall Lotus Carlton; Lotus Esprit, Lotus Elan, Lotus Elise | 1986 | 1993 | GM owned Lotus from 1986 to 1993. |
| 6 | Magna Steyr | Graz | Austria | Saab 9-3 Convertible | 2003 | 2009 | Built under contract by Magna Steyr for Saab. |
| | Mercury Marine | Stillwater, Oklahoma | United States | LT5 DOHC V8 engine (C4 Corvette ZR-1) | 1989 | 1993 | Engine was built for GM by Mercury Marine. Located at 3003 N Perkins Rd. Closed in 2011. Sold in 2012 to Asco Industries. |
| H | Navistar - Springfield Assembly Plant (Main Line) | Springfield, Ohio | United States | Chevrolet Silverado Medium Duty; International CV | 2019 | | Located at 6125 Urbana Road. Jointly developed by GM & Navistar. Built under contract by Navistar for GM. |
| N | Navistar - Springfield Assembly Plant (Secondary Line) | Springfield, Ohio | United States | Chevrolet Express cutaway, GMC Savana cutaway | 2017 | | Located at 6125 Urbana Road. Built under contract by Navistar for GM. |
| | Neal and Massy Industries Ltd. | Morvant later moved to Arima | Trinidad and Tobago | Holden Commodore; Holden Kingswood; Chevrolet Caprice (Statesman DeVille); Opel Rekord; Vauxhall Cresta; Vauxhall Victor; Vauxhall Viva; Bedford trucks | 1966 | 1994 (Production for GM may have ended earlier) | Built under license by Neal and Massy for GM. Assembly operation closed in 1994. |
| | Nexus Automotive | Port Qasim, Karachi, Sindh | Pakistan | Chevrolet Joy | 2005 | 2009 | Built under license for Nexus Automotive by Ghandhara Nissan at a plant with spare capacity. |
| K | Nissan Mexicana | Cuernavaca | Mexico | Chevrolet City Express; Nissan NV200 | 2015 | 2018 | Nissan plant. Chevrolet City Express discontinued after 2018. |
| | Nissan Motor Ibérica | Barcelona | Spain | Opel Vivaro A (high roof versions only); Renault Trafic (high roof versions only); Nissan Primastar (high roof versions only) | | 2015 | This is a Nissan plant that built vans for Opel/Vauxhall as part of a supply deal between GM Europe & Renault. Van production ended in 2015 and was moved to Renault's plant in Sandouville, France. Nissan closed this plant in Dec. 2021. |
| Z | NUMMI | Fremont, California | United States | Chevrolet Nova (1985-88); Geo Prizm; Pontiac Vibe; Toyota Corolla; Toyota Tacoma; Toyota Voltz | 1984 | 2009 | Located at 45500 Fremont Blvd. Operated from 1963 to 1982 as a GM factory. Became New United Motor Manufacturing Inc. (NUMMI) in 1984, a 50/50 joint venture between GM and Toyota and assembled both GM and Toyota vehicles. Sold to Tesla Motors in May 2010. |
| 6 | Opel Eisenach GmbH | Eisenach | Germany | Opel/Vauxhall Corsa E (3-door); Opel/Vauxhall Corsa D (3-door); Opel/Vauxhall Corsa C (3-door); Opel/Vauxhall Corsa B Opel/Vauxhall Adam; Opel Astra F | 1992 | 2017 | Opel plant. Sold to PSA Group in 2017. |
| | Opel Werk Kaiserslautern | Kaiserslautern | Germany | components engines: four-cylinder turbo diesel engines: 2.0 turbodiesel 4-cyl. 1.9 turbodiesel 4-cyl. four-cylinder petrol engines: GM Ecotec engine 2.2; GM Family II engine 1.6, 2.0; GM Ecotec engine 2.0 supercharged (LSJ) | 1966 | 2017 | Opel plant. Sold to PSA Group in 2017. |
| 1 R (Catera); 5 (Pre-1976) | Opel Werk Rüsselsheim | Rüsselsheim | Germany | Opel/Vauxhall Insignia; Buick Regal; Holden Commodore ZB; Opel/Vauxhall Astra J (5-door); Opel/Vauxhall Zafira Tourer C Opel/Vauxhall Vectra; Opel/Vauxhall Signum; Opel/Vauxhall Omega; Cadillac Catera; Opel/Vauxhall Senator & Vauxhall Royale; Opel Monza/Vauxhall Royale Coupe; Opel Commodore/Vauxhall Viceroy; Opel Kapitan; Opel Admiral; Opel Diplomat; Opel Kadett; Opel Olympia; Opel/Vauxhall/Holden Calibra | 1898 | 2020 | Opel plant. Sold to PSA Group in 2017. Rüsselsheim continued to supply the Buick Regal and Holden Commodore ZB to GM through 2020. |
| S | Opel Szentgotthárd | Szentgotthárd | Hungary | Opel Astra F Opel Vectra B1 and B2; Opel Engines including GM Family 1 engine GM Medium Diesel engine GM Medium Gasoline Engine "VTi" CVT transmission Allison 3000, 4000, & Torqmatic Series automatic transmissions | 1992 | 2019 | Opel plant. Production of Allison Transmissions began in 2000. Sold to PSA Group in 2017. Szentgotthárd continued to supply the 1.6L LH7 turbodiesel I4 to GM through 2019. |
| | Opel Wien GmbH | Aspern | Austria | Family 0 engines (1.0, 1.2, 1.4, 1.4 Turbo); Transmissions (Easytronic, five-and six-speed manual) | 1982 | 2017 | Opel plant. Sold to PSA Group in 2017. Past engines: GM Family 1 engine SOHC versions. |
| | PT. Pantja Motor | Sunter, North Jakarta, Jakarta | Indonesia | Chevrolet Tavera | 2001 | 2005 | Isuzu's Indonesian assembler, now known as Isuzu Astra Motor Indonesia. Built the Isuzu Panther-based Tavera for GM Indonesia. |
| | Pininfarina | Grugliasco | Italy | Cadillac Eldorado Brougham (Series 6900) painted bodies | 1959 | 1960 | Bodies were built by Pininfarina and mated with chassis shipped to Italy by Cadillac and then shipped back to the US. |
| | Pininfarina | San Giorgio Canavese | Italy | Cadillac Allanté painted bodies | 1987 | 1993 | Bodies were designed and supplied under contract by Pininfarina for Cadillac. Plant was built specially for the Allanté. |
| | Pragoti Industries Ltd. | Sitakunda, Chittagong Division | Bangladesh | Vauxhall Viva; Bedford trucks and buses | 1966 | 1970's | Began as part of Ghandhara Industries Ltd. in 1966 when Bangladesh was still East Pakistan and assembled GM vehicles like the Ghandhara plant in Karachi did. After Bangladesh became independent, the operation was nationalized by the new government and became Pragoti Industries Ltd. |
| B (GM) | Renault Batilly | Batilly | France | Opel Arena; Renault Trafic; Opel Movano A Opel Movano B Renault Master; Renault Trucks Mascott; Nissan Interstar; Nissan NV400 | | 2017 | Renault-SOVAB plant |
| | Renault Sandouville | Sandouville | France | Opel/Vauxhall Vivaro B (high roof versions only); Renault Trafic; Nissan NV300; Nissan Primastar; Fiat Talento | | 2017 | Renault plant |
| | Renault Santa Isabel | Santa Isabel, Cordoba | Argentina | Chevrolet C-20 & D-20; Chevrolet Grand Blazer; Chevrolet Silverado; Chevrolet Trafic/SpaceVan | 1991 | 2002 | Renault Argentina-CIADEA plant. Built Chevrolets under license for GM. |
| | Saab Gothenburg Transmission | Gothenburg | Sweden | Saab two-stroke F35 transmission GM F40 transmission | 1953 | 2009 | Saab plant. Engine production ended in 1968. GM bought 50% of Saab Automobile in 1989 & the other 50% in 2000. Transmission production ended when the 1st gen. 9-5 ended production. GM sold Saab Automobile sold to Spyker Cars in February, 2010. |
| | Saab Södertälje Engine | Södertälje | Sweden | Saab B engine Saab H engine | 1972 | 2007 | Saab plant. GM bought 50% of Saab Automobile in 1989 & the other 50% in 2000. Engine plant sold to Scania AB in 2007. GM sold Saab Automobile sold to Spyker Cars in February, 2010. |
| 1,2,3,4,8 | Saab Trollhättan Assembly | Trollhättan | Sweden | Saab 9-3; Saab 9-5; Cadillac BLS | 1947 | 2010 | Saab plant. Produced engines & transmissions until 1953. GM bought 50% of Saab Automobile in 1989, the other 50% in 2000. GM sold Saab sold to Spyker Cars in February 2010. |
| | SaryarkaAvtoProm | Kostanay | Kazakhstan | Chevrolet Cobalt, Chevrolet Malibu, Chevrolet Nexia, Chevrolet Tracker | 2017 | | Built under contract by SaryarkaAvtoProm for GM & UzAuto Motors. Past models: Chevrolet Niva, Damas/Labo, Ravon Nexia R3 |
| | Sevel Argentina | Estación Ferreyra, Córdoba, Cordoba | Argentina | Chevrolet C-20/D-20 | 1985 | 1991 | Fiat - PSA jointly owned plant. Built Chevrolets under license for GM. |
| | GM Strasbourg | Strasbourg | France | 6L45/6L50 6-speed RWD automatic transmissions | 1967 | | Past products: 5L40, 4L30, TH180/3L30 RWD automatic transmissions Also supplied 4-, 5-, & 6-speed RWD auto. transmissions to BMW. Also supplied 3-speed RWD auto. transmissions to Fiat, Peugeot, & Rover. Sold to Punch Powerglide in 2013. Continues to make components for ZF Friedrichshafen. |
| G, H (Saab) | Subaru Main Plant | Ōta, Gunma | Japan | Saab 9-2X; Chevrolet Forester (India) | | | Subaru plant |
| W (GM), 4 (Suzuki) | Suzuki Iwata Assembly | Iwata, Shizuoka | Japan | Geo Tracker; Suzuki Sidekick; Suzuki Grand Vitara; Suzuki XL-7 | | | Suzuki plant |
| K (GM), 5 (Suzuki) | Suzuki Kosai Assembly | Kosai, Shizuoka | Japan | Chevrolet Sprint; Geo Metro; Suzuki Swift; Chevrolet/Holden Cruze (YGM1) | | | Suzuki plant |
| M (GM), 0 (Suzuki/Fiat/Subaru) | Magyar Suzuki Corporation | Esztergom | Hungary | Opel/Vauxhall Agila B Suzuki Splash; Suzuki Swift; Subaru Justy; Suzuki SX4; Fiat Sedici; Suzuki Ignis; Subaru G3X Justy | 1992 | 2014 (GM prod.) | Suzuki plant |
| | Suzuki Sagara Assembly & Engine | Makinohara, Shizuoka Prefecture | Japan | Chevrolet MW | 2000 | 2010 | Suzuki plant. Also built the 3.6-liter GM High Feature V6 engine (Suzuki N36A) to power the 2nd generation Suzuki XL7 under license from GM. (Note: Dates reflect beginning & end dates of production for GM.) |
| | Tecna SA | Arica | Chile | Acadian; Acadian Beaumont (1966-71 from CKD kits supplied by GM Oshawa and Willow Run); Vauxhall Victor | 1962 | 1971 | |
| | Tecno S.A. | Uruca, San José | Costa Rica | GM Amigo | 1970s | (?) | A version of GM's BTV called the Amigo was assembled in Costa Rica. |
| H | General Motors Thailand Ltd. | Pluak Daeng, Rayong province | Thailand | Chevrolet/Holden Colorado & Holden Rodeo; Chevrolet/Holden Trailblazer & Holden Colorado 7 Chevrolet Cruze; Chevrolet Optra; Chevrolet Aveo; Chevrolet/Holden Captiva | 2000 | | Past Models: Opel/Vauxhall/Chevrolet/Holden Zafira, Subaru Traviq, Isuzu D-Max, Alfa Romeo 156; Sold to Great Wall Motors in 2020. |
| | General Motors Powertrain (Thailand) Ltd. | Pluak Daeng, Rayong province | Thailand | 2.5 L (R 425 DOHC) & 2.8 L (R 428 DOHC & A 428 DOHC) turbodiesel I4 engines | 2011 | | Sold to Great Wall Motors in 2020. |
| 9 (GM), 6 (Fiat & Ram) | Tofaş | Bursa | Turkey | Opel/Vauxhall Combo D Fiat Doblo; Ram ProMaster City | 2011 | 2017 | Fiat plant (joint venture with Koç Holding of Turkey). |
| | PT. Udatin (Usaha Dagang Teknik Indonesia) | Surabaya, East Java | Indonesia | Holden vehicles GMC trucks | 1959 | 1988 | |
| | Unison | Minsk | Belarus | Chevrolet Tahoe K2XX, Chevrolet Tracker, Cadillac Escalade K2XX, Opel Mokka | 2015 | 2018 | Built under contract by Unison for GM. Production ended in 2018. |
| 6,7 (Saab); 9 (Opel/Vauxhall) | Valmet Automotive | Uusikaupunki | Finland | Saab 9-3 Convertible & 9-3 Viggen; Saab 900; Opel/Vauxhall Calibra | 1969 | 2003 | Built under contract by Valmet Automotive for Saab & for Opel/Vauxhall. |
| 8 (since 1993); E (before 1993) | Vauxhall Ellesmere Port | Ellesmere Port | United Kingdom | Opel/Vauxhall Astra K (5-door, Sports Tourer); Opel/Vauxhall Astra J (5-door, Sports Tourer); Opel/Vauxhall Astra H Opel/Vauxhall Astra G Opel/Vauxhall Astra F Opel Kadett E/Vauxhall Astra Mk II; Vauxhall Belmont; Opel Kadett Combo/Bedford Astravan & Astramax; Vauxhall Astra Mk I Vauxhall Chevette; Bedford Chevanne; Vauxhall Firenza; Vauxhall Magnum; Opel/Vauxhall Vectra C Opel/Vauxhall Vectra B Vauxhall Viva; General Motors 54° V6 engine | 1962 | 2017 | Vauxhall plant. Also made engines, transmissions, axles, & other components. Engine production ended in 2004. Sold to PSA Group in 2017. |
| | GM Vietnam | Hanoi | Vietnam | Chevrolet Aveo; Chevrolet Captiva; Chevrolet Cruze; Chevrolet Lacetti; Chevrolet Spark Lite; Chevrolet Spark; Chevrolet Orlando; Chevrolet Vivant; Daewoo Cielo; Daewoo Lacetti; Daewoo Lanos; Daewoo Leganza; Daewoo Magnus; Daewoo Matiz; Daewoo Nubira | 1995 | 2018 | Originally established as VIDAMCO (a joint venture with a state owned co.) in 1993 by Daewoo Motor Co. Daewoo bought out its Vietnamese partner in April 2000, making VIDAMCO 100% owned by Daewoo Motor Co. Bought by GM in 2002 as part of the creation of GM Daewoo Auto & Technology Co. Sold to VinFast in 2018. VinFast Fadil produced under license from GM; is a rebadged Chevrolet Spark (M400)/Opel Karl. |
| | Yulon GM | Miaoli | Taiwan | Buick Excelle; Buick LaCrosse | 2006 | 2012 | A joint venture owned 49% by GM & 51% by Yulon. Yulon bought GM's stake in the venture in Dec. 2008. Production continued after the sale through licensing but cooperation between GM & Yulon ended in 2012. |
| X | ZAZ | Zaporizhia & Illichivsk | Ukraine | Chevrolet Aveo, Chevrolet Lacetti, Chevrolet Lanos, Opel Astra Classic, Opel Astra, Opel Corsa, Opel Combo, Opel Meriva, Opel Vectra, Opel Zafira | 2003 | 2012 | Built under contract by ZAZ for GM. |

== Former factories ==
| VIN | Name | City/State | Country | Products | Opened | Idled | Comments |
|---|---|---|---|---|---|---|---|
| | AC Rochester | Sioux City, Iowa | United States | Throttle Body Fuel Injection Systems | 1981 | 1993 | Formerly a Zenith Radio Factory. |
| | AC Rochester | Wichita Falls, Texas | United States | AC Air Filters | 1972 | 2008 | Transferred to Delphi Automotive Systems in 1999. Closed by Delphi in 2008. |
| | ACDelco | Flint, Michigan | United States | AC Spark Plugs | 1912 | 1976 | Located on Industrial Ave. Production moved to Flint East complex. |
| | Delco Electronics | Oak Creek, Wisconsin | United States | AC Spark Plugs | 1956 | 2010 | Now Drexel Town Square. |
| | Allison Transmission | Indianapolis, Indiana | United States | Allison transmissions | 1915 | 2007 | Located at 4700 W. 10th St. GM sold Allison Transmission in 2007 to a private equity firm. |
| | Cadillac Amsterdam Street plant | Detroit, Michigan | United States | Cadillacs | 1903 | 1920 | Cadillac's first volume production plant. Located at 450 Amsterdam Street. Rebuilt in 1904 after a fire destroyed the original plant; replaced by the Clark Street plant in 1921. |
| 5 (Plant 2) 6 (Plant 1) 9 (Pre-1976) | Antwerp | Antwerp | Belgium | Opel Astra/Vauxhall Astra | 1925 | 2010 | Originally known as GM Continental SA, then as Opel Antwerp from 1994 to 2004, and GM Belgium from 2004 on. |
| | GM Colmotores | Bogotá | Colombia | Products from GM do Brasil: Chevrolet Joy Products from Isuzu: Chevrolet F-Series Bus, Chevrolet F-Series truck, Chevrolet N-Series Bus, Chevrolet N-Series truck, Chevrolet LV-series Bus | 1979 | | Founded in 1956 as Colmotores, acquired by GM in 1979. Closed in 2024. |
| | GM-OBB | Quito | Ecuador | Chevrolet D-Max 2011 | 1980 (1st GM product) | | GM bought 22% of OBB in 1981 & became majority shareholder in 1988. Closed in 2024, see above. |
| | General Motors de Argentina | San Telmo and Barracas in Buenos Aires & San Martin | Argentina | Chevrolet cars and trucks Oldsmobile; Opel K 180; Bedford TJ; Chevrolet 153 4-cylinder Chevrolet Turbo-Thrift engine Bedford diesel engines | 1925 (San Telmo); 1928 (Barracas); 1940 (San Martin) | 1978 (San Martin) | Other GM brands manufactured included GMC, Opel, and Bedford trucks along with Pontiac, Oakland, Marquette, Buick, LaSalle, Cadillac, Opel, and Vauxhall passenger cars. Also Frigidaire refrigerators. |
| 3 (since 1993); A (before 1993) | Azambuja | Azambuja | Portugal | Opel Kadett Combo A/Bedford & Vauxhall Astravan & Astramax; Opel/Vauxhall/Holden Combo B Opel/Vauxhall/Holden Combo C | 1963 | 2006 | Produced various Opel, Vauxhall, and Bedford models. |
| B | Baltimore Assembly | Baltimore, Maryland | United States | Chevrolet Astro; GMC Safari | 1935 | 2005 | Located at 2122 Broening Highway. Now the Chesapeake Commerce Center and an Amazon distribution center. |
| | Baltimore Transmission | White Marsh, Maryland | United States | Allison 1000 Series transmissions Hybrid 2-mode transmissions (2ML70); Electric motor (MME) & final-drive unit (1ET35) for Chevy Spark EV; Torque converters | 2000 | 2019 | Located at 10301 Philadelphia Road. Originally part of Allison Transmission; became a GM Powertrain facility in 2004. Name changed to Baltimore Operations in 2012 with the addition of the Electric Motor Plant built next to the existing Transmission Plant. |
| T | Bedford Dunstable plant | Dunstable | United Kingdom | Bedford trucks | 1942 | 1992 | GM sold the Bedford heavy truck business to AWD Trucks in 1987. AWD Trucks went bankrupt in 1992. |
| | Bombay | Bombay, Maharashtra | India | Chevrolet cars, trucks, & buses | 1928 | 1954 | The first automobile assembly plant in India. |
| | Buffalo Assembly/ Buffalo Gear & Axle | Buffalo, New York | United States | Chevrolet vehicles Axles, drivetrain components | 1923 | 1994 | Located at 1001 E. Delavan Ave. Built cars until World War II and was then converted to make axles; renamed Saginaw Gear and Axle in 1984. Sold to American Axle in 1994. |
| H | Buick City | Flint, Michigan | United States | Buick LeSabre; Oldsmobile 88 (1987-1995); Pontiac Bonneville (1996-1999) | 1904 | 1999 | |
| | Cadillac Stamping | Detroit, Michigan | United States | Stamped body parts for Cadillac | 1956 | 1987 | Located at 9501 Conner St. |
| | Chevrolet Gear & Axle | Detroit, Michigan | United States | Axles, gears, other components | 1919 | 1994 | Located at 1840 Holbrook Ave. Absorbed the former Northway engine plant on Holbrook Ave. in 1926 when Northway was liquidated. Straddles the border of Detroit and Hamtramck, Michigan. Sold to American Axle & Manufacturing Inc. in 1994. |
| | Fisher Body - Chicago Metal Fabrication | Willow Springs, Illinois | United States | Stampings (such as floorpans) for GM vehicles | 1953 | 1989 | Located at 79th Street and Willow Springs Road. Buick produced J65-B-3 jet engines here for the Republic F-84F Thunderstreak/RF84-F Thunderflash for use in the Korean War. |
| | General Motors de Chile | Arica | Chile | Chevrolet LUV; Chevrolet LUV (TF); Chevrolet Grand LUV (TF); Chevrolet D-Max | 1974 | 2008 | |
| | Danville Foundry | Danville, Illinois | United States | | 1943 | 1995 | Iron castings. Was part of GM's Central Foundry Division. Leased by Defense Plant Corporation to pour castings for military equipment during World War II. Also supplied castings to Ford, Chrysler, and AMC. |
| | Delco Chassis | Livonia, Michigan | United States | Bumpers | 1953 | 1998 | Located at 12950 and 13000 Eckles Road. Buildings demolished in 2001 and redeveloped into multi-tenant commercial use. |
| | Delco Moraine NDH (NDH=New Departure Hyatt) | Dayton, Ohio (Needmore Rd.) | United States | Brake system components | | 1999 | Located at 3100 Needmore Road. Spun off with Delphi in 1999. Closed by Delphi in 2008. |
| | Delco Moraine NDH (NDH=New Departure Hyatt) | Dayton, Ohio (Wisconsin Blvd.) | United States | Engine bearings Brake system components | 1936 | 2003 | Located at 1420 Wisconsin Boulevard. |
| | Delco Moraine NDH (NDH=New Departure Hyatt) | Sandusky, Ohio | United States | Wheel bearings and bearing assemblies | 1946 | 1999 | Located at 2509 Hayes Ave. |
| | Delco Products | Kettering, Ohio | United States | Shock absorbers, struts, impact absorbers, electric motors, windshield wiper assemblies | 1957 | 1999 | Located at 2555 Woodman Dr. Spun off with Delphi Automotive Systems in 1999. |
| | Delco Remy | Anderson, Indiana | United States | Starters, generators, ignition components, switches | 1906 | 1994 / 1999 | Heavy Duty products spun off as Delco Remy International in 1994. Ignition (Plant 20) and Generator (Plant 11) products along with the Engineering Center (Plant 18) transferred to Delphi Automotive Systems in 1999. |
| | Delco Remy | Muncie, Indiana | United States | Batteries | 1908 | 1994 | Located on West Willard Street. |
| 9 (1979-1988) Q (1971-1978) | Detroit Assembly (Cadillac Clark Street plant) | Detroit, Michigan | United States | Cadillacs; Cadillac engines | 1921 | 1987 | Located at 2860 Clark St. Factory closed December 1987, chrome plating operation closed in March 1993, engineering building (including tool room) closed in March 1994. |
| | Fleetwood - Detroit Body Assembly (Fisher Body No. 18) | Detroit, Michigan | United States | Bodies for Cadillac & LaSalle | 1917 | 1987 | Originally built to build aircraft for World War I. Taken over by Fisher Body in 1919. Also known as Fisher Body Plant #18. Located at 261 West End Ave. |
| | Detroit Forge | Detroit, Michigan | United States | Forged metal components | c.1919 | 1994 | Located at 8435 St Aubin St. Straddles the border of Detroit and Hamtramck. Sold to American Axle & Manufacturing Inc. in 1994. |
| 3 | Chevrolet-Detroit Truck & Bus Plant | Detroit, Michigan | United States | Chevrolet Step-Van; GMC Value-Van; Chevrolet & GMC P-Series motorhome & commercial chassis Chevrolet Van G30 HD/ GMC Vandura G3500 HD cutaway | 1974 | 1999 | Located at 601 Piquette Ave. in Detroit. Formerly Fisher Body No. 23. |
| | Detroit Transmission | Livonia, Michigan | United States | Hydramatic automatic transmissions | | 1953 | Factory burned down in August 1953. Salvaged equipment was moved to Willow Run Transmission. |
| 5 C | General Motors Diesel | London, Ontario | Canada | EMD Locomotives; New Look bus Terex earthmovers Military vehicles | 1950 | 1979 | Located at 2021 Oxford St. E. |
| 3 M | General Motors Diesel Division Saint-Eustache Bus Plant | Saint-Eustache, Quebec | Canada | GMC New Look bus Classic bus | 1979 | 1987 | Manufactures transit buses. Sold to Motor Coach Industries, along with the designs for the bus models this factory produced, in 1987. |
| | General Motors Diesel Division Saint Laurent Bus Plant | Saint Laurent, Quebec | Canada | GM New Look bus | 1974 | 1979 | Bus operations moved to Saint-Eustache, Quebec. |
| D (1965-2009) C (1964) | Doraville Assembly | Doraville, Georgia | United States | Buick Terraza; Chevrolet Uplander; Pontiac Montana SV6; Saturn Relay | 1947 | 2008 | Located at 3900 Motors Industrial Way. |
| | General Motors East Africa | Nairobi | Kenya | Isuzu F-Series; Isuzu N-Series; Isuzu buses | 1977 | 2017 | |
| | Electro-Motive Division - La Grange Operations | McCook, Illinois | United States | Locomotives; Engines; Components | 1936 | | Located at 9301 W. 55th St. Electro-Motive headquarters and R&D operations. Locomotive production ended in 1991 and was moved to London, ON, Canada. |
| X | Fairfax Assembly (Fairfax I) | Kansas City, Kansas | United States | Full-size Chevrolet, Pontiac, Oldsmobile, and Buick cars | 1946 | 1987 | Located at 100 Kindelberger Road. Production moved to new building on adjacent site (Fairfax II) for 1988 model year production. |
| | Fisher Body No. 12 | Detroit, Michigan | United States | | 1916 | 1942 | Located at 1961 E. Milwaukee Ave. |
| | Fisher Body No. 21 | Detroit, Michigan | United States | Bodies for Buick & Cadillac; Engineering and Tool & Die operations Bodies for Cadillac limousines | 1919 | 1984 | Located at 700 Piquette Ave. Produced parts for B-25 bombers in World War II. |
| | Fisher Body No. 23/23B | Detroit, Michigan | United States | Stamping plant through 1972. | 1921 | 1972 | Located at 601 Piquette Ave. |
| | Fisher Body No. 37 | Detroit, Michigan | United States | Large bodyside stampings | 1919 | 1985 | Located at 950 E Milwaukee Ave. Produced aircraft and tank assemblies, 90 mm AA guns, 5” naval gun housings and Lockheed missile parts during World War II. |
| | Flint Body Assembly | Flint, Michigan | United States | Bodies for Buick, Cadillac, Chevrolet, & Oldsmobile | 1923 | 1987 | Located at 4000-4500 S. Saginaw St. Originally a Durant Motors plant. Bought by GM in 1925 and became Fisher Body Plant No. 1 - Flint. |
| | Chevrolet-Flint (V8) Engine Plant (Van Slyke Road) | Flint, Michigan | United States | Chevrolet small-block V8; Chevrolet Turbo-Thrift I6; Chevrolet 153 4-cylinder engine Isuzu G140 & G161Z 4-cylinder engine | 1954 | 1999 | Located at 3848 Van Slyke Road. Only V8 engines were made until 1961, when 4- and 6-cylinder engines began to be made for the 1962 Chevy II. |
| | Chevrolet-Flint Manufacturing Complex; Flint West | Flint, Michigan | United States | Chevrolet vehicles Chevrolet engines including Chevrolet Stovebolt / Blue Flame I6 | 1913 | 2004 | Located at 300 N. Chevrolet Ave. (formerly known as Wilcox Street). The complex originally included metal stamping, body assembly, vehicle assembly, engine assembly, and various component manufacturing plants. |
| | Flint North Powertrain | Flint, Michigan | United States | Buick V8 engine Buick V6 engine | 1905 | 2010 | Complex was made up of several factories. Factory 36 was the engine plant. Factory 36 opened in 1952 and closed in 2008. The remainder of the complex closed by December 2010. |
| | Flint East | Flint, Michigan | United States | components (spark plugs, dashboard components such as instrument clusters, fuel system components, air/oil/fuel filters, and fuel pumps) | 1925 | 1999 | Located at 1300 North Dort Highway. Spun off with Delphi Corporation in 1999. |
| | Fort Worth Assembly | Fort Worth, TX | United States | Chevrolet Series 490; Chevrolet Series F | 1917 | 1924 | closed due to flood damage |
| G | Framingham Assembly | Framingham, Massachusetts | United States | A-body mid-size cars | 1948 | 1989 | Located at 63 Western Ave. |
| | General Motors France S.A. | Gennevilliers | France | Chevrolet; Buick | 1939 | 1940 | Operations interrupted by German invasion of France and seizure of the plant in 1940 during WWII. |
| Z (1965-1982) H (1963-1964 Chevrolet) F (1964 Pontiac and Oldsmobile) 3 (1964 Buick) | Fremont Assembly | Fremont, California | United States | Mid-size cars Full-size trucks and SUVs | 1963 | 1982 | Located at 45500 Fremont Blvd. Later became New United Motor Manufacturing Inc. (NUMMI). |
| | General Motors Gmbh | Berlin | Germany | Chevrolet; Pontiac; Oakland; Oldsmobile; Buick; Cadillac | 1927 | 1932 | Replaced Hamburg plant. Located in Borsigwalde area of Berlin. Also predates the acquisition of Opel by GM. |
| | General Motors Gmbh | Hamburg | Germany | Chevrolet trucks | 1926 | 1927 | GM's first German plant predating the acquisition of Opel. Located in a leased warehouse. |
| | General Motors Ltd. | Hendon, England | United Kingdom | Chevrolet | 1924 | 1930 | GM's first British plant predating the acquisition of Vauxhall. Operated out of a leased plant. |
| | General Motors Ltd. | Southampton, England | United Kingdom | Chevrolet | 1938 | 1946 | Operations interrupted by German bombing of the UK during WWII. |
| | GM Powertrain Fredericksburg | Fredericksburg, Virginia | United States | Torque converter clutches for automatic transmissions | 1979 | 2010 | Located at 11032 Tidewater Trail. Originally part of Delco Moraine Division, which bought the plant in 1978 from American Poclain. Moved to GM Powertrain division in 1993. |
| | Grand Blanc Metal Center | Grand Blanc, Michigan | United States | Metal stampings and metal fabrication of body components, Tooling jigs-and-fixtures | 1942 | 2013 | Located at 10800 S. Saginaw St. Built M4 Sherman and M26 Pershing tanks during WWII and M48 Patton tanks beginning in 1952. Buick used it as a warehouse from 1947 until Fisher Body bought it in 1951. Converted in 1955 into an automotive body metal fabricating plant. Became part of GM's Metal Fabricating Division in 1994 and became Grand Blanc Weld Tool Center in 2002. |
| | Grand Rapids Metal Center | Wyoming, Michigan | United States | | 1936 | 2009 | Located at 300 36th Street SW. Metal fabricating plant. Demolished. |
| | Guide Headlamp Division | Anderson, Indiana | United States | Headlamp, Taillamp assemblies | 1929 | 1998 | |
| H | Halol | Gujarat | India | Chevrolet Sail U-VA (hatchback); Chevrolet Sail (sedan); Chevrolet Cruze; Chevrolet Tavera | 1995 | 2017 | The new GM India began as a 50/50 joint venture with Hindustan Motors in 1994. Sold to SAIC to produce MG Motor India vehicles in 2017. |
| | Fisher Body - Hamilton-Fairfield Stamping Plant | Hamilton, Ohio | United States | Stampings and bodies for GM vehicles | 1947 | 1988 | Located at 4400 Dixie Highway. Now the Fisher Industrial Park. |
| | Harrison Radiator Division - Moraine | Moraine, Ohio | United States | Machining and assembly of automotive A/C compressors, valves, and accumulator dehydrators | 1941 | 1999 | Located at 3600 Dryden Road. Originally built for Frigidaire. In 1975, automotive and appliance operations were split with the automotive operations becoming Delco Air Conditioning Division. Spun off with Delphi Automotive Systems in 1999. |
| | Holden Acacia Ridge Plant | Acacia Ridge, Queensland | Australia | Holden models | 1966 | 1984 | Holden plant. |
| | Holden Birkenhead Plant | Birkenhead, South Australia | Australia | Chevrolet; Pontiac; Oakland; Oldsmobile; Buick; Cadillac; GMC; Vauxhall; Bedford; Holden | 1926 | 1981 | Holden plant. |
| | Holden Dandenong Plant | Dandenong, Victoria | Australia | Holden models Toyota Corolla (E90); Bedford by Isuzu and Isuzu trucks Body making Torque converters & other components | 1956 | 1996 | Holden plant. Also assembled Chevrolet trucks, Bedford vans & trucks and Frigidaire appliances. Vehicle production by Holden ceased in 1989, vehicle production by Toyota for itself and for Holden lasted from 1989 to 1994 under a plant lease agreement. Minor assembly until 1996. |
| L | Holden Elizabeth Plant | Elizabeth, South Australia | Australia | Holden Berlina; Holden Calais; Holden Caprice; Holden Commodore; Holden Ute; Holden Statesman; Vauxhall VXR8; Chevrolet SS; Chevrolet Caprice PPV | 1959 | 2017 | Holden manufacturing plant. |
| | Holden Fishermans Bend Plant (Port Melbourne) | Port Melbourne, Victoria | Australia | Holden Alloytec V6 engine Buick V6; GM Family II I4 engine Holden V8 engine Holden Starfire I4; Holden straight-six motor Manual transmissions Holden Banjo/Salisbury differentials Axles; Stampings; Components; Foundry | 1936 | 2016 | Headquarters of GM Holden Ltd. Holden's Engine Company/Holden Engine Operations. Once built vehicles as well; vehicle assembly ended in 1956 and was moved to Dandenong. |
| | Holden Fortitude Valley Plant | Fortitude Valley, Queensland | Australia | Chevrolet; Pontiac; Oakland; Oldsmobile; Buick; Cadillac; GMC; Vauxhall; Bedford; Holden | 1927 | 1965 | Holden plant. Built by GM Australia before it merged with Holden's Motor Body Builders Ltd. |
| | Holden Marrickville Plant | Marrickville, New South Wales | Australia | Chevrolet; Pontiac; Oakland; Oldsmobile; Marquette; Buick; Cadillac; GMC; Vauxhall; Bedford | 1926 | 1940 | Holden plant. Built by GM Australia before it merged with Holden's Motor Body Builders Ltd. |
| | Holden City Road Plant | Melbourne, Victoria | Australia | Chevrolet; Pontiac; Oakland; Oldsmobile; Buick; Cadillac; GMC; Vauxhall | 1926 | 1936 | Holden plant. Acquired by GM Australia before it merged with Holden's Motor Body Builders Ltd. |
| | Holden Mosman Park Plant | Mosman Park, Western Australia | Australia | Chevrolet; Pontiac; Oakland; Oldsmobile; Buick; Cadillac; GMC; Vauxhall; Bedford; Holden | 1926 | 1972 | Holden plant. Built by GM Australia before it merged with Holden's Motor Body Builders Ltd. Also produced military vehicles & equipment during WWII. |
| | Holden Pagewood Plant | Pagewood, New South Wales | Australia | Chevrolet; Pontiac; Vauxhall; Bedford; Holden; Statesman; Body making | 1940 | 1980 | Holden plant. Also produced military equipment during WWII. |
| | Holden Woodville Plant | Woodville, South Australia | Australia | Holden: Stamping; Body making Paint shop Body Hardware; Trim; Tool & Die; Tri-Matic automatic transmission | 1923 | 1965 | Holden plant. Built before Holden was taken over by GM. Built car bodies for many brands of cars including GM brands (Chevrolet, Pontiac, Oakland, Oldsmobile, Marquette, Buick, LaSalle, Cadillac, GMC, Vauxhall, & Bedford) and non-GM brands (Chrysler, DeSoto, Dodge, Plymouth, Willys, Hudson, Nash, Studebaker, Austin, Morris, Rover, Standard, Fiat, & others). (Holden Motor Body Works.) Also produced military equipment during WWII. Once Holden brand cars started to be made in 1948, body and chassis components were made in Woodville. |
| | Indianapolis Metal Center | Indianapolis, Indiana | United States | Metal stampings for trucks | 1930 | 2011 | Located at 340 S. White River Parkway W. Drive. Stamping plant. |
| | GM Indonesia | Pondok Ungu, Bekasi, West Java | Indonesia | Chevrolet Spin; Chevrolet Blazer; Opel Blazer; Opel Optima; Opel Vectra | 1995 | 2015 | Originally established as PT. General Motors Buana Indonesia, which was owned 60% by GM and 40% by PT. Garmak Motor. |
| | Inland Plant | Dayton & Vandalia, Ohio | United States | Engine Mounts; Transmission Mounts; Strut Mounts; Steering Wheels; Liteflex Springs; Brake Linings; Brake Hose; Brake Pads; Ball Joints; Ice Cube Trays | 1921 | 2008 | |
| | Inland Fisher Guide Plant (Columbus, Ohio) | Columbus, Ohio | United States | Door Panel Assemblies & Small Components | 1946 | 2007 | Located at 200 Georgesville Road. |
| | Inland Fisher Guide Plant (Detroit - Fort St.) | Detroit, Michigan | United States | Door hinges and interior parts | 1920 | 1989 | Located at 6307 W. Fort St. |
| | Inland Fisher Guide Plant (Elyria, Ohio) | Elyria, Ohio | United States | Car seats | 1947 | 1990 | Located at 1400 Lowell St. |
| | Inland Fisher Guide Plant (Euclid, Ohio) | Euclid, Ohio | United States | Vehicle Bodies until 1970; Then, trim fabrication, Seat Covers & Backs | 1943 | 1993 | Located at 20001 Euclid Ave. |
| | Inland Fisher Guide Plant (Flint - Coldwater Road) | Genesee Township, Michigan | United States | Window regulators, door hinges, door modules and seat adjusters | 1953 | 1996 | Located at 1245 East Coldwater Road. |
| | Inland Fisher Guide Plant (Grand Rapids, Michigan) | Walker, Michigan | United States | Interior trim | 1942 | 1998 | Located at 2150 Alpine Avenue NW. Built by Haskelite Manufacturing Corporation to make wooden gliders for use in WWII. Bought by GM in the early 1950s. Built fuselages for F-84F Thunderstreak fighter jets. |
| | Inland Fisher Guide Plant (Livonia, Michigan) | Livonia, Michigan | United States | Seat Cushions, Seat Pads, Seat Backs, Door Panel Trim | 1954 | 1995 | Built on the site of the former Detroit Transmission plant that burned down in 1953. Located at 28400 Plymouth Road. |
| | Inland Fisher Guide Plant (Syracuse) | Salina, New York | United States | Metal auto parts (die casting, stamping, machining, painting, plating), Plastic trim parts - exterior and interior (injection molding) | 1952 | 1993 | Located at One General Motors Drive (address sometimes listed as 1000 Town Line Road). |
| | Inland Fisher Guide Plant (Tecumseh, Michigan) | Tecumseh, Michigan | United States | Seat components | 1966 | 1988 | Located at 5550 Occidental Highway. |
| | Inland Fisher Guide Plant (Trenton) | West Trenton, Ewing Township, New Jersey | United States | Door handles Seat adjusters Exterior body moldings and painted components. Plant was previously known as the Ternstedt Plant | 1938 | 1998 | Located at 1445 Parkway Ave. Built TBM Avenger torpedo bombers during WWII. In 1961, the facility became the first commercial user in the United States to use a programmable industrial robot to replace human workers. |
| | Inland Fisher Guide Plant (Vandalia, Ohio) | Vandalia, Ohio | United States | Door Panel Assemblies; Seat Pads; Instrument Panels | 1941 | 1999 | |
| | General Motors International A/S | Copenhagen | Denmark | Chevrolet; Oakland; Pontiac; Oldsmobile; Buick; Opel; Vauxhall | 1924 | 1974 | GM's first European assembly plant and first assembly plant outside North America. |
| | Ipiranga | Ipiranga, São Paulo (state) | Brazil | Chevrolet; Oakland; Pontiac; Oldsmobile; Buick; Cadillac | 1925 | 1930 | GM's first Brazilian assembly plant. Replaced by Sao Caetano do Sul plant. |
| J | Janesville Assembly Plant | Janesville, Wisconsin | United States | Chevrolet Suburban; Chevrolet Tahoe; Chevrolet Cavalier; Chevrolet K5 Blazer; Chevrolet Tiltmaster/W-Series; GMC Forward/W-Series; Isuzu N-Series; GMC Yukon; GMC Suburban; GMC Yukon XL | 1919 | 2009 | Located at 1000 General Motors Dr. Oldest GM assembly plant at time of closure and the largest under one roof in the U.S. |
| | GM Java | Tanjung Priok, North Jakarta, Jakarta | Indonesia | Chevrolet; Opel (1.2 Liter); Vauxhall (10-4) | 1927 | 1953 | First car factory in what is now Indonesia. |
| | Kalamazoo Metal Center | Kalamazoo, Michigan | United States | Stamped body panels | 1965 | 1999 | Located at 5200 East Cork Street. |
| K | GM Korea | Gunsan, Jeolla | South Korea | Chevrolet Cruze; Chevrolet Orlando; Family Z diesel engine | 1997 | 2018 | This factory also produced Chevrolet vehicles for General Motors Europe and Chevrolet Europe. Diesel engines were produced at an adjacent facility beginning in 2006. |
| A | Lakewood Assembly | Lakewood Heights, Georgia | United States | Chevrolet Caprice; Oldsmobile Custom Cruiser; Buick Estate Wagon | 1928 | 1990 | Located at McDonough Boulevard and Sawtell Avenue. |
| | Lansing Car Assembly - Body | Lansing, Michigan | United States | Automotive bodies | 1920 | 2005 | Located at 401 N. Verlinden St. Known as GM's Lansing Plant 6. It supplied bodies to the main Oldsmobile plant (Lansing Plant 1 or Lansing Car Assembly - Chassis). Together with the chassis plant, they made up Lansing Car Assembly. |
| M | Lansing Car Assembly - Chassis (North) | Lansing, Michigan | United States | GM N platform cars | 1902 | 2005 | Main Oldsmobile plant, part of GM's Lansing Plant 1. Located around 1014 Townsend St., next to the former Oldsmobile headquarters at 920 Townsend St. |
| C (1985-2004) | Lansing Car Assembly - Chassis (South) | Lansing, Michigan | United States | GM N platform cars | 1902 | 2004 | Started using separate plant code from the North plant beginning with the 1985 N-body cars. Part of GM's Lansing Plant 1. |
| B (0 for EV1) | Lansing Craft Centre | Lansing Township, Michigan | United States | Chevrolet SSR | 1987 | 2006 | Located at 2801 West Saginaw Street. Oldsmobile used this plant as a forge (through 1983) and for making axles and differentials (through 1984). First opened as a vehicle assembly plant known as the Reatta Craft Centre in 1988. After Buick Reatta production ended in 1991, plant was renamed Lansing Craft Centre and used to complete production of the Chevy Cavalier and Pontiac Sunfire convertibles. |
| | Lansing Engine | Delta Township, Michigan | United States | Oldsmobile Diesel V6; Quad 4 engine GM Ecotec engine (2002 only) | 1981 | 2002 | Located at 2901 S. Canal Road. Known as GM's Lansing Plant 5 or Delta Engine. |
| | Lansing Metal Center | Lansing Township, Michigan | United States | | 1952 | 2006 | Located at 2800 W. Saginaw Street, across the street from the Lansing Craft Centre. Known as GM's Lansing Plant 3 or the Olds Jet plant. |
| K | Leeds Assembly | Kansas City, Missouri | United States | Buick Skyhawk, Oldsmobile Firenza, Chevrolet Cavalier | 1929 | 1988 | Located at 6817 Stadium Drive. |
| K ('94-'05) E ('65-'91) | Linden Assembly | Linden, New Jersey | United States | Chevrolet Blazer; GMC Jimmy | 1937 | 2005 | Located at 1016 W. Edgar Road. During WWII, GM built the FM-1 Wildcat and FM-2 Wildcat fighter planes at Linden. |
| | Livonia Engine | Livonia, Michigan | United States | Premium V engine (Northstar V8, Aurora V8, "Shortstar" V6) | 1971 | 2010 | Located at 12200 Middlebelt Road. |
| 7 (1979-2019) U (1966-1978) | Lordstown Assembly | Warren, Ohio | United States | Chevrolet Cruze (2016-2019) | 1966 | 2019 | Located at 2300 Hallock-Young Road. |
| | Mansfield Metal Center | Ontario, Ohio | United States | Metal stamping | 1955 | 2010 | Located at 2525 W. 4th St. Mostly demolished. Redeveloped into Ontario Commerce Park. |
| | Massena Castings Plant | Rooseveltown, New York | United States | aluminum engine block & cylinder heads for Corvair engine, Vega engine, J-body engine | 1959 | 2009 | Cylinder heads, Engine Blocks; Closed May 1, 2009; 56 Chevrolet Rd, Rooseveltown, NY 13683 |
| | Mexico City Assembly | Mexico City | Mexico | Chevrolet trucks & vans | 1937 | 1995 | Chevrolet including: Caprice, Chevelle, Corvair, Impala, Malibu, Nova; Pontiac, Oldsmobile, Buick, Cadillac, Opel Olympia, Opel Rekord/MX-1/Fiera; Switched from assembly to manufacturing in 1965. |
| 2 | Moraine Assembly | Moraine, Ohio | United States | Chevrolet S-10; Chevrolet S-10 Blazer (including 1995-05 GMT330 SUVs without the S-10 prefix); GMC S-15; GMC S-15 Jimmy (including 1995-05 GMT330 SUVs without the S-15 prefix); Buick Rainier; Chevrolet TrailBlazer; GMC Envoy; Isuzu Ascender regular length Oldsmobile Bravada; Saab 9-7X; Grumman LLV chassis | 1951 | 2008 | Located at 2601 West Stroop Road. Began in 1951 as part of the Frigidaire Division of General Motors Corporation producing household appliances. Frigidaire production ended in 1979 when GM sold Frigidaire to White Consolidated Industries but kept the Moraine plant and converted it to build vehicles. Vehicle production began in 1981. Was part of GM's Truck & Bus Group. Closed on December 23, 2008. Sold to Fuyao Group in 2014; began production of automotive glass for GM and other automakers in 2016. |
| | Moraine Engine | Moraine, Ohio | United States | Detroit Diesel V8 engine 6.2L/6.5L | 1981 | 2000 | Located at 4100 Springboro Pike. Also began as a Frigidaire plant. Replaced by the nearby DMAX Ltd. engine plant (originally a joint venture with Isuzu) which builds the replacement engine (Duramax V8 engine). Demolished by 2003. Production of the 6.5-liter diesel V8 moved to a new AM General plant in Franklin, OH known as General Engine Products. AM General makes the engine for its own use and for GM service parts, & 3rd party customers. |
| | Muncie Transmission | Muncie, Indiana | United States | Transmissions including: Getrag 282/NVG T550, Getrag 284, Muncie M17, Muncie M20/M21/M22, Muncie M62/M64, Muncie SM420 transmission, Muncie SM465 transmission, NV3500/NV3550, NV4500; Valves, Steering gears Forge | 1902 | 2006 | Located at 1200 W. Eighth St. Originally founded as Warner Gear Company. Bought by GM in 1919. Became Muncie Products Division. Closed in 1932. Reopened by Chevrolet in 1935 (Chevrolet Muncie). Became part of New Venture Gear joint venture with Chrysler in 1990. GM owned 36% while Chrysler owned 64%. GM sold its stake to DaimlerChrysler in 2002 but took back the Muncie plant. The plant closed in 2006. |
| | General Motors New Zealand | Petone | New Zealand | Chevrolet including Chevrolet Deluxe, Chevrolet Bel Air, Chevrolet Impala; Pontiac including Pontiac Laurentian, Pontiac Parisienne; Oldsmobile; Buick; Opel Kadett; Vauxhall including Vauxhall Cresta (E, PA, PC), Vauxhall Wyvern, Vauxhall Velox, Vauxhall Viva, Vauxhall Victor; Bedford including Bedford CF, Bedford TK; Holden including Holden FE, Holden FB, Holden EJ, Holden EH, Holden HD | 1926 | 1984 | Also made Frigidaire refrigerators, freezers, washers, and dryers (Frigidaire was owned by GM from 1919 to 1979). Axle tube assemblies, oil filters, and spark plugs. |
| | General Motors New Zealand | Trentham | New Zealand | Vauxhall including Vauxhall Chevette, Vauxhall Cresta, Vauxhall Viva; Holden including Holden HQ, Holden Statesman HQ, Holden HJ, Holden HX, Holden HZ, Holden Commodore (VB), Holden Commodore (VC), Holden Commodore (VH), Holden Commodore (VK), Holden Commodore (VL), Holden Commodore (VN), Holden Commodore Royale (VH/VK/VL); Holden Camira; Holden Barina; Suzuki Swift; Daihatsu Charade (under contract for Daihatsu); Nissan Navara pickup (under contract for Nissan) | 1967 | 1990 | |
| | GM Nordiska AB | Södra Hammarbyhamnen, Stockholm | Sweden | Chevrolet; Opel; Vauxhall; Bedford trucks | 1928 | 1957 | Converted into a warehouse in 1957. |
| | Northway Motor Plant | Detroit, Michigan | United States | Northway engines, Axles, parts for past model Chevrolets | 1905 | Burned down 1987 | Located at 4584 Maybury Grand Ave. (Jeffries Expressway Service Drive) and W. Hancock St. Around 4646 Lawton St. (rear side) is the remnants of a water tower and railroad spur. Northway Motor and Manufacturing Company was acquired by GM in 1909, becoming Northway Motor and Manufacturing Division. Northway had made engines for both GM brands (in particular Oakland, Oldsmobile, Sheridan, Scripps-Booth, Samson Tractor, and GMC) and other automakers. Became part of GM Intercompany Parts Group. In 1920, Northway moved to a new plant on Holbrook Ave. in Detroit. This address seems to have subsequently been used by Frigidaire in the 1920s and 1930s and then by Refrigeration Service Inc. in the 1950s. At some point, the building was sold to Motor City Wiping Cloth Co. but they abandoned the property in 1983, leaving behind massive bales of rags and cloths. The building burned down in a horrific fire in 1987 after homeless people in the building were burning fires there to keep warm. The fire killed three firefighters and injured ten others. The fire even spread to the nearby Continental Paper warehouse. |
| | Northway Motor Plant/General Motors Truck Co. Plant No. 7/Chevrolet Gear and Axle Div. | Detroit, Michigan | United States | Northway engines, Axles, parts for past model Chevrolets | 1920 | 1994 | Located at 1806 Holbrook Ave. Northway Motor and Manufacturing Company was acquired by GM in 1909, becoming Northway Motor and Manufacturing Division. Northway had made engines for both GM brands (in particular Oakland, Oldsmobile, Sheridan, Scripps-Booth, Samson Tractor, and GMC) and other automakers. Became part of GM Central Products Division. In 1920, Northway moved here from their original plant on Maybury Grand Ave. and primarily supplied engines to GMC. In 1925, became part of Yellow Truck & Coach Manufacturing Company as part of the merger of Yellow Cab Manufacturing Company and General Motors Truck Corp., the manufacturer of GMC trucks. In 1926, Northway Motor Division was liquidated and its Detroit plant was sold to Chevrolet on March 31 to become the Chevrolet Gear and Axle Div. Part of the engine tooling machinery was transferred to the Yellow Sleeve-Valve Engine Works at East Moline IL. Some Northway engines were still used by some GMC trucks (K-series) until at least 1930. Part of the Detroit complex sold to American Axle in 1994. Now part of American Axle's Advanced Technology Development Center. |
| N | Norwood Assembly | Norwood, Ohio | United States | Buick Apollo; Chevrolet Bel Air; Chevrolet Biscayne; Chevrolet Camaro; Chevrolet Caprice; Chevrolet El Camino; Chevrolet Impala; Chevrolet Nomad; Chevrolet Nova; Pontiac Firebird | 1923 | 1987 | Located at 5025 Carthage Ave. Closed August 1987. Demolished. Now Linden Pointe on the Lateral, a mixed use retail and office space. Chevrolet Superior; Chevrolet Series AA Capitol; Chevrolet Series AB National; Chevrolet Series AC International; Chevrolet Series AD Universal; Chevrolet Series AE Independence; Chevrolet Series BA Confederate; Chevrolet Standard Six; Chevrolet Series CA Eagle / Master; Chevrolet Master; Chevrolet Deluxe; Chevrolet Fleetmaster; Chevrolet 150; Chevrolet 210; Chevrolet Delray; Chevrolet AK Series; Chevrolet Advance Design; Chevrolet Task Force; Chevrolet C/K; Chevrolet Suburban |
| O (Chevrolet) C (GMC) | Oakland Assembly | Oakland, California | United States | Chevrolet Series 490; Chevrolet Superior; Chevrolet Series AA Capitol; Chevrolet Series AB National; Chevrolet Series AC International; Chevrolet Series AD Universal; Chevrolet Series AE Independence; Chevrolet Series BA Confederate; Chevrolet Standard Six; Chevrolet Series CA Eagle / Master; Chevrolet Master; Chevrolet Deluxe; Chevrolet 150; Chevrolet 210; Chevrolet Delray; Chevrolet Bel Air; Chevrolet Corvair; Chevrolet Impala; Chevrolet Advance Design; Chevrolet Task Force; Chevrolet C/K; GMC New Design; GMC Blue Chip; GMC C/K; Chevrolet Suburban; GMC Suburban | 1917 | 1963 | Located at 73rd Ave. & Foothill Blvd. Built by Chevrolet before it became part of GM. Replaced by Fremont Assembly plant. Demolished. Site became Eastmont Mall which is now Eastmont Town Center. |
| 6 | Oklahoma City Assembly | Oklahoma City, Oklahoma | United States | Chevrolet TrailBlazer EXT; GMC Envoy XL; GMC Envoy XUV; Isuzu Ascender extended length | 1979 | 2006 | Located at 7447 SE 74th Street. Previously produced front wheel drive X platform (Chevrolet Citation & Pontiac Phoenix) vehicles as well as Buick Century, Chevrolet Celebrity, Chevrolet Malibu, Oldsmobile Cutlass, Oldsmobile Cutlass Ciera, and Pontiac 6000. Idled February 20, 2006. Taken over by Oklahoma City in 2008 and leased to neighbor Tinker Air Force Base. Now known as Building 9001. Used for maintaining jet engines and for software engineering. |
| 2 | Opel Werk Bochum | Bochum | Germany | Opel Ascona A, B Opel Kadett A, B, C, D, & E Opel Astra F, G, & H Opel Astra H Classic (5-door, Caravan); Opel Manta A, B Opel/Vauxhall Zafira Tourer C Opel/Vauxhall Zafira B/Zafira Family; Opel/Vauxhall Zafira A Vauxhall Astra; Engines; Transmissions; Axles | 1962 | 2014 | Engine production ended in 2004. Axle production ended in 2011. Transmission production ended Oct. 7, 2013. Vehicle production ended December 5, 2014. |
| | Opel Werk Brandenburg | Brandenburg an der Havel, Brandenburg | Germany | Opel Blitz | 1935 | 1944 | Bombed and heavily damaged by the Allies on Aug. 6, 1944. Factory was dismantled and shipped to the Soviet Union after the war ended as reparations. |
| | Osaka Assembly (Former Nippon Menka factory) | Osaka | Japan | Chevrolet, Pontiac, Oldsmobile, Buick from CKD kits | 1927 | 1941 | Factory was seized by Imperial Japanese Government, see also General Motors Japan |
| 1 | Oshawa Truck Assembly | Oshawa, Ontario | Canada | Chevrolet Silverado; GMC Sierra | 1965 | 2009 | Part of the overall Oshawa Assembly complex (Autoplex) on Park Road South. Truck plant was at 1100 Park Road South at the southern end of the Autoplex. Now the GM Canadian Technical Centre's (CTC) McLaughlin Advanced Technology Track. Chevrolet C/K; GMC C/K |
| | Packard Electric Plant# 41 | Warren, Ohio | United States | Automotive wiring | 1947 | 1998 | Acquired by GM in 1932. Located at 1554 Thomas Rd SE. Sold in 2004 to Wetzel, Inc. Sold to Berk Enterprise, Inc. in 2009. |
| | Parma Powertrain | Parma, Ohio | United States | Transmissions including Powerglide 2-speed automatic, THM250/250C/350/350C/375B 3-speed automatic | 1949 | 2011 | Located at 5520 & 5570 Chevrolet Blvd. next to Parma Metal which GM still operates. 5520 is now used by the US Postal Service and Hearn Industrial LLC, a logistics provider to the auto industry. 5570 is now a terminal for Pitt Ohio. |
| | GM Peninsular SA | Barcelona | Spain | Chevrolet trucks | 1932 | 1936 | Production ended due to Spanish Civil War. Liquidated around 1939. |
| | GM del Peru | Lima | Peru | Chevrolet Bel Air; Chevrolet Camaro; Chevrolet Caprice; Chevrolet Chevelle/Chevrolet Malibu; Chevrolet Impala; Opel Kadett; Opel Rekord; Vauxhall Victor | 1945 | 1970 | |
| | Pittsburgh Metal | West Mifflin, Pennsylvania | United States | Metal stamping | 1949 | 2008 | Located at 1451 Lebanon School Road. Originally part of Fisher Body division. Demolished in 2011. |
| | GM Polsce Sp. Zo.o. | Warsaw | Poland | Chevrolet cars and trucks | 1928 | 1930's | Closed during the Depression. |
| P | Pontiac Assembly | Pontiac, Michigan | United States | Pontiac Fiero RWD G-bodies: Buick Regal (1985-1987), Chevrolet Monte Carlo (1987-1988), Oldsmobile Cutlass Supreme (1985-1987), Oldsmobile Cutlass Supreme Classic (1988) | 1927 | 1988 | Final assembly plant was located on N. Glenwood Ave. Complex also known as Pontiac North to distinguish from GMC's multiple plants in Pontiac, MI. Final Assembly was Plant 8 of Pontiac's Assembly complex in Pontiac, Michigan. Idled in 1982 but reopened in January 1985. Closed in December 1987. Last vehicle built was a Buick Regal Grand National. Demolished in 1997. GM still has the Pontiac Redistribution Center on the northeast portion of this property at 1251 Joslyn Road at the intersection with E. Columbia Ave. The Pontiac Metal Center is another still active part of this property. GM still uses the eastern part of the property bordered by Joslyn Ave. on the east, E. Beverly Ave. on the north, E. Montcalm St. on the south, and N. Glenwood Ave. on the west. This area includes GM Performance and Racing Center at 900 N. Glenwood Ave. and the propulsion systems Pontiac Engineering Center at 800 N. Glenwood Ave. Fisher Body operated a plant on the site (Plant 17) from 1935 to 1982. This plant, located at 888 Baldwin Ave., was converted to build the Pontiac Fiero, which it built from 1983 to 1988. Closed in 1988. GM used it as a warehouse until 2009. Most of the Fiero plant was demolished in 2013. Pontiac engines were made in Plant 9 and Plant 18. Both have been demolished (plant 9 demolished in 1997). Pontiac Six, Pontiac 2+2, Pontiac Bonneville, Pontiac Can Am, Pontiac Catalina, Pontiac Chieftain, Pontiac Executive, Pontiac Grand Am (1973-1975), Pontiac Grand Am (1978-1980), Pontiac Grand Prix, Pontiac Grand Safari, Pontiac Grand Ville, Pontiac GTO 1964-1973, Pontiac LeMans, Pontiac Safari, Pontiac Star Chief, Pontiac Streamliner, Pontiac Tempest, Pontiac T-37, Pontiac Torpedo, Pontiac Ventura |
| V (1972-1990) P (Pre-1972) | Pontiac Central Assembly | Pontiac, Michigan | United States | Medium Duty Trucks, Heavy Duty Trucks, Buses (PD-4501 Scenicruiser, GM New Look bus, GM Buffalo bus, Rapid Transit Series); Chevrolet/GMC C-Series medium-duty trucks (1967-1972); Chevrolet/GMC C-Series medium-duty trucks (1985-1990); Chevrolet Kodiak (1985-1990); GMC Top Kick (1985-1990); Chevrolet Bruin; GMC Brigadier; WhiteGMC Brigadier; Chevrolet Bison; GMC General; Chevrolet Titan; GMC Astro; Engines (GMC straight-6 engine 1947-1962, GMC V6/V12 engine, GMC 60° V8) | 1928 | 1989 | Located at 660 South Boulevard East. Known as GMC Truck & Coach Division Plant 2 when built. Headquarters of GMC Truck & Coach Division. Administration and engineering buildings were part of the complex. Built over 500,000 6x6 CCKW trucks and DUKW "Ducks" during WW-2. Converted in 1994 into a Truck Product Engineering Center (Pontiac Centerpoint Campus) by GM using only the steel frame of the large main building while everything else was demolished. The Truck Product Engineering Center closed in 2009 and the site is now the Centerpoint Business Campus, which is occupied by many businesses including Fanuc Robotics and i.M. Branded. |
| E (1988-2009) V (1972-1985) | Pontiac East Assembly | Pontiac, Michigan | United States | Medium Duty Trucks Chevrolet/GMC C-Series medium-duty trucks (1973-1985), (Chevrolet Kodiak (1981-1985), GMC Top Kick) (1981-1985), Chevrolet C/K (GMT400), GMC Sierra (GMT400), Chevrolet Silverado (GMT800), GMC Sierra (GMT800), Chevrolet Silverado (GMT900), GMC Sierra (GMT900) | 1972 | 2009 | Located at 2100 South Opdyke Road. Known as GMC Truck & Coach Division Plant 6 when built, also known as Pontiac Assembly Center. Demolished in 2011-2012. Portions of the site are now occupied by Challenge Manufacturing Co. and Williams International. |
| 0 (1979-1994) V (1972-1978) P (Pre-1972) | Pontiac West Assembly | Pontiac, Michigan | United States | Engines, Trucks, Buses, GMC Motorhome, Chevrolet/GMC vans 1964-1970, Chevrolet S-10; GMC Sonoma; Chevrolet S-10 Blazer; GMC S-15 Jimmy; GMC Typhoon | 1906 | 1994 | Complex includes GMC Truck & Coach Division Plants 1, 3, 4, and 5. Plant 1 was originally the plant of Rapid Motor Vehicle Company, one of the 2 main ancestors of the modern GMC Division (the other being Reliance Motor Car Company). Plant 1 was located at 25 Rapid Street and opened in 1906, before Rapid was taken over by GM in 1908-1909. Plant 1 was demolished around 1981. Plant 3 opened in 1940 and was located at South Boulevard West and Franklin Road. Plant 3 built the GMC Motorhome. Plant 3 was demolished around 2005. Plant 4 was located on South Saginaw Street (now Woodward Ave.) Engine production began in Plant 4 in 1938. The GMC straight-6 engine was built there through 1947. Plant 4 also built the 1964-1970 Chevrolet & GMC full-size vans. Plant 4 was demolished around 2008. Plant 5 was located on Franklin Road, to the north of Plant 3. Plant 5 was demolished around 2005. Entire property sold to M1 Concourse in 2014. |
| | Pontiac Foundry | Pontiac, Michigan | United States | Iron castings of engine parts. | 1927 | 1987 | Was part of GM's Central Foundry Division. Was Plant 6 of Pontiac's Assembly complex in Pontiac, Michigan. Demolished in 1995. A U.S. Postal Service distribution center located at 711 N. Glenwood Ave. now occupies the approximate area where the foundry used to be. |
| | Regina Plant | Regina, Saskatchewan | Canada | Buick, Chevrolet (Maple Leaf), Oldsmobile, Pontiac | 1928 | 1941 | Taken over by the Government of Canada to produce munitions for World War II. |
| | Saginaw Malleable Iron | Saginaw, Michigan | United States | | 1919 | 2007 | Located at 77 W. Center St. Iron castings. HQ of Central Foundry Division. In 1919, Saginaw Malleable Iron and Central Foundry merged with the Jacox division into GM's Saginaw Products Company. In 1928, became the Saginaw Malleable Iron division of GM. Closed in 2007, demolished in 2010. Converted into a park. |
| | Saginaw Nodular Iron | Saginaw, Michigan | United States | Steering knuckles, crankshafts, disc brake caliper housings, exhaust manifolds, flywheels, differential carriers, clutch pressure plates | 1967 | 1988 | Located at 2100 Veterans Memorial Parkway. Straddles the City of Saginaw-Buena Vista Township border. Iron castings. Closed in 1988. Later demolished. |
| | Saginaw Parts | Saginaw, Michigan | United States | | 1907 | 1983 | Located on corner of 6th & Washington Avenues. Bought by GM in 1909 as part of its purchase of Rainier Motor Car Company. Made Rainier, Marquette, and Peninsular cars as well as parts for Welch and Welch-Detroit cars. All of those activities ended at the end of 1912. In 1917, during World War I, the plant was reopened and used to manufacture mortar shells for the US Ordnance Corps. In 1919, became part of the Saginaw Products Company with this plant becoming the Saginaw Products Company Motor Plant. From 1919 to 1922, the plant made OHV I4 engines for Chevrolet Series FB and Oldsmobile Model 43A. It was then used as a warehouse. From 1935, it made all different types of auto parts and service parts as Chevrolet Saginaw Service Parts Plant or from 1969, Chevrolet Saginaw Parts Plant. Closed in 1983, demolished in 1984. |
| | Saginaw Steering Gear - Plant 1 | Saginaw, Michigan | United States | Steering components | 1906 | 1984 | Located on 628 North Hamilton St. Originally founded as the Jackson, Church and Wilcox Company (Jacox) in 1906. Bought by GM in 1910. Became the Jackson-Church-Wilcox or Jacox division of GM. In 1919, the Jacox division merged with Saginaw Malleable Iron and Central Foundry into GM's Saginaw Products Company. Became the Saginaw Steering Gear Division in 1928. Closed in 1984. Sold in 1987 to Thomson Industries. Still operates today as Thomson Aerospace & Defense, a brand of Linear Motion LLC, which is owned by the Umbra Group of Italy. |
| | Saginaw Steering Gear - Plant 2 | Saginaw, Michigan | United States | Steering Gears, pump hoses | 1941 | 2001 | Located at 1400 Holmes Street. Affectionately known as "The Gun Plant", it was built in 1941 when the division was contracted to build M1919 machine guns, and M1-Carbines for World War II. After the war, normal steering gear production continued until its closure in 2001. It was demolished in 2002. |
| | Saginaw Steering Gear complex | Buena Vista Township, Michigan | United States | Complete Hydraulic and Electric Power Steering Systems, Halfshafts, Intermediate Drive Shafts | 1953 | 2010 | Located at 3900 E. Holland Road. Former Saginaw Steering Division of GM. Plant 3 opened in 1953, Plant 4 opened in 1956. The sprawling Five-Plant complex (Plants 3-7), division Headquarters and large engineering center, were spun off with Delphi in 1999. GM re-purchased the Steering division from bankrupt Delphi in 2009, and then sold the division to Pacific Century Motors in 2010. The former GM Division now operates as "Nexteer Automotive", an independent company headquartered at the Saginaw site. Nexteer moved its headquarters to Auburn Hills in 2015. |
| | Saginaw Transmission | Saginaw, Michigan | United States | Manual Transmissions, Brakes | 1920 | 1999 | Located at 2328 E. Genesee Ave. Built 1919–20 for the Michigan Crankshaft Company (originally founded as National Engineering Company), acquired by GM in 1921 and placed under Saginaw Products Company. In 1928, became the Saginaw Crankshaft Division of GM. Transferred to Chevrolet upon the dissolution of the Crankshaft Division in 1931 when crankshaft manufacturing was turned over to the car divisions. Made the "Saginaw" 3 and 4-Speed manual transmissions. It was spun off as part of Delphi in 1999. The plant was sold to TRW Automotive in 2007. TRW used the plant to produces brake and suspension components (known as TRW Braking and Suspension). TRW closed this plant in 2014. |
| 2 | Sainte-Thérèse Assembly | Boisbriand, Quebec | Canada | Chevrolet Camaro; Pontiac Firebird | 1966 | 2002 | Located at 2500 Boulevard De la Grande-Allée. Past models: Chevrolet Celebrity; Oldsmobile Cutlass Ciera; Oldsmobile Cutlass Supreme; Pontiac Bonneville; Pontiac Grand Prix; Chevrolet Vega; Pontiac Astre; Chevrolet Monza; Pontiac Sunbird; Oldsmobile Starfire; Buick Skyhawk; Chevrolet Biscayne; Chevrolet Impala; Chevrolet Chevelle; Beaumont. Plant demolished and site re-developed as a commercial and residential site known as Faubourg Boisbriand and the Centre for Sports Excellence. |
| 4 | Scarborough Van Assembly | Scarborough, Ontario | Canada | Chevrolet Van; GMC Vandura; Chevrolet Sportvan; GMC Rally Van | 1952 | 1993 | Located at 1901 Eglinton Avenue East. Originally a Frigidaire home appliance plant. In 1968, switched to making automotive components. Converted to build full-size vans in 1974. Closed in May 1993 and operations moved to Flint Truck Assembly. Plant demolished and now site of Eglinton Town Centre and Comstock Bus Garage at the southern end of the property. |
| 8 | Shreveport Operations | Shreveport, Louisiana | United States | Chevrolet Colorado; GMC Canyon; Hummer H3; Hummer H3T; Isuzu i-series | 1981 | 2012 | Located at 7600 General Motors Blvd. General Motors Blvd. was renamed Antoine Blvd. in 2013. A portion of the complex is now used by Glovis America, a Hyundai Automotive Group subsidiary, for a vehicle logistics and processing center for Hyundai and Kia vehicles. Past models: Chevrolet S-10, Chevrolet S-10 EV, Chevrolet S-10 Blazer, GMC S-15, GMC S-15 Jimmy, GMC Sonoma, GMC Syclone, Isuzu Hombre. |
| A | General Motors South Africa Darling Street & Kempston Road plants | Port Elizabeth | South Africa | Acadian; Acadian Beaumont & Beaumont (from CKD kits supplied from Oshawa and Willow Run 1966-69); Chevrolet Series AA Capitol; Chevrolet Series AB National; Chevrolet Series AC International; Chevrolet Series AD Universal; Chevrolet Series AE Independence; Chevrolet Series BA Confederate; Chevrolet Standard Six; Chevrolet Series CA Eagle / Master; Chevrolet Master; Chevrolet Ascona; Chevrolet Caprice; Chevrolet Caprice Classic; Chevrolet Constantia; Chevrolet Corvair; Chevrolet Chevair; Chevrolet Chevelle/Chevrolet Malibu; Chevrolet Chevy II/Nova; Chevrolet De Ville; Chevrolet El Camino; Chevrolet El Toro; Chevrolet Impala; Chevrolet Kommando; Chevrolet LUV; Holden EK; Holden EJ; Holden EH; Holden HD; Holden HR; Holden Monaro (HT)/Chevrolet SS (HG); Pontiac Parisienne; Chevrolet Firenza/1300/1900; Chevrolet 2500, 3800, 4100; Chevrolet Rekord; Opel Ascona C Opel Kadett A Opel Kadett B Opel Kadett D Opel Kadett E/Monza; Opel Kadett F Opel Astra G Opel Corsa B/Corsa Lite; Opel Rekord; Vauxhall Cresta; Vauxhall Velox; Vauxhall Victor; Vauxhall Viscount; Vauxhall Viva; Isuzu F-Series; Isuzu N-Series; Isuzu KB; Isuzu KB (D-Max based) | 1926 (Darling Street); 1928 (Kempston Road) | 1929 (Darling Street); 2017 | Also assembled in the pre-WWII era: Chevrolet; Pontiac; Oakland; Oldsmobile; Buick; LaSalle; Cadillac; GMC; Vauxhall; Bedford; Opel; Frigidaire appliances. Also built the Ranger. GM sold the factory to Isuzu in 2017 and left the South African market. Isuzu consolidated its commercial truck production in the Struandale plant which already built Isuzu pickups and the Kempston Road plant ended production on Nov. 30, 2018. |
| 4 | General Motors South Africa Struandale plant | Port Elizabeth | South Africa | Chevrolet Spark (M300); Opel Corsa C Opel Corsa Utility/ Chevrolet Utility; Hummer H3; Isuzu KB | 1996 | 2017 | Struandale was originally a Ford plant opened in 1973 which GM South Africa bought during the time it was known as Delta Motor Corp. in 1994. GM sold the factory to Isuzu in 2017 and left the South African market. Struandale absorbed Isuzu pickup production beginning with the 2nd generation D-Max around 2013 & Isuzu commercial truck (Isuzu F-Series & Isuzu N-Series) production in Jan. 2019. Isuzu KB was renamed D-Max in South Africa in 2018, aligning with the rest of the world. |
| | General Motors South Africa Engine plant - Aloes | Port Elizabeth | South Africa | Chevrolet 153 4-cylinder engine Chevrolet Turbo-Thrift inline-6 Vauxhall Viva inline-4 | 1965 | 1982 | |
| C (1965-1982) U (1964) | South Gate Assembly | South Gate, California | United States | | 1936 | 1982 | Located at 2700 Tweedy Blvd. Plant demolished and site used for 3 new schools for L.A. School District and the South Gate Industrial and Business Park at the southern end of the property. First GM plant to build multi-carline body/chassis (Buick/Olds/Pontiac) serially. Other models: Tanks (WWII); Unibody B-O-P "Y"-body Buick Special, Oldsmobile F-85, Pontiac Tempest added to B-& C-body mix 1961-63; replaced by Chevrolet B-body for 64; Chevrolet Vega; Chevrolet Monza; Pontiac Astre; Pontiac Sunbird; Oldsmobile Starfire (H-body); Buick Skyhawk; Buick Centurion; Buick Century; Buick Invicta; Buick LeSabre; Buick Roadmaster; Buick Special (1936-1958); Buick Wildcat; Chevrolet Bel Air; Chevrolet Caprice; Chevrolet Impala; Oldsmobile 88; Oldsmobile 98; Oldsmobile Starfire (1961–1966); Pontiac Bonneville; Pontiac Catalina; Pontiac Executive; Pontiac Grand Prix (1962-1968); Pontiac Star Chief; Pontiac Ventura; Cadillac Deville; Chevrolet Cavalier (1982); and Cadillac Cimarron (1982) |
| | St. Catharines Components Plant | St. Catharines, Ontario | Canada | Engine and Transmission components, Final drive assemblies for powertrains, Axles | 1929 | 2010 | Was located at 285 Ontario Street. Originally McKinnon Dash and Metal Work Ltd., which opened this site in 1900. Axle Plant is officially renamed Components Plant. Taken over by GM in 1929. Permanently closed in 2010 as part of GM's restructuring plans. All operations were transferred to St. Catharines Propulsion Plant. The components factory was demolished in 2016 and the site will be re-developed for mixed-use residential and commercial development. |
| | St. Catharines Foundry | St. Catharines, Ontario | Canada | Iron castings of engine parts | 1952 | 1995 | Was located at 285 Ontario Street. Operated as part of GM subsidiary McKinnon Industries, Ltd. until 1969 when it became "General Motors of Canada Limited, St. Catharines". Aligned with GM's Central Foundry Division in 1989. |
| S | St. Louis Truck Assembly | St. Louis, Missouri | United States | Chevrolet C/K; GMC C/K (Rounded Line); Chevrolet R/V (1987 only); GMC R/V (1987 only) | 1920 | 1987 | Located at 3809 N. Union Blvd. Chevrolet had previously licensed Gardner Buggy Co. to assemble its cars in St. Louis in 1915. That was replaced by Chevrolet's own St. Louis plant on Union Blvd. Built DUKW amphibious vehicles during WWII. Operated 3 assembly lines: car line, truck line, and the Corvette line. 695,214 Corvettes were built from 1954 to 1981 in the old Fisher Body Mill Building that had been used to assemble wooden bodies in earlier years and was converted to Corvette production. Chevy Caprice & Impala production ended in 1980. Was a Truck and Bus Group plant from 1982, only making full-size pickups. Closed August 1987. Property is now the Union Seventy Center, an industrial warehouse and distribution campus used by several different tenants. Chevrolet 150, Chevrolet 210, Chevrolet AK Series, Chevrolet Advance Design, Chevrolet Bel Air, Chevrolet Biscayne, Chevrolet K5 Blazer (1969-1972), Chevrolet Corvair Forward Control, Chevrolet Caprice, Chevrolet Corvette (1954–81), Chevrolet Delray, Chevrolet El Camino (1959-1960), Chevrolet Impala, Chevrolet Nomad, Chevrolet Suburban, Chevrolet Task Force, GMC C/K (Action Line), GMC Jimmy (1970-1972), GMC New Design, GMC Suburban |
| | General Motors Suisse AG | Biel | Switzerland | Chevrolet 1936-1941, 1946-1968; Pontiac 1937-1939, 1946-1959 (None produced in 1955-1956); Oldsmobile 1936-1940, 1947-1958; Buick 1936-1940, 1946-1958; LaSalle 1936; Cadillac 1938-1940; Opel 1936-1941, 1950-1975; Vauxhall 1936-1940, 1946-1971; Ranger 1970-1975 | 1936 | 1975 | Run by General Motors Suisse AG. First car off the line was a Buick Model 41. Other prewar cars built include the Buick Series 90 & Opel P4. Closed August 14, 1975. Last car was an Opel Rekord D. A total of 329,864 cars were assembled. Regular as well as customized vehicles in small series were made like drawing vehicles for the Swiss Armed Forces: An open 6-seater Chevrolet Platform combined with an Opel 2.5L I-6 cylinder; after World War II those "Swiss" cars were also offered to the public as limousines. As well GM produced luxury upgraded vehicles for the European market like the Opel Kapitän, Rekord "Ascona Edition", and the Kadett-based Opel Ascona 1700 up to the early 1970s. The Ranger was invented by using Vauxhall structures on an Opel Rekord C body. Also built the first generation Chevrolet Camaro, Chevrolet Chevelle, Chevrolet Chevy II / Nova, & the Chevrolet Corvair from CKD kits. Also built the Vauxhall Victor and the special Victor Riviera as well as the Vauxhall Cresta and Vauxhall Viscount. Afterwards the plant was used as GM's European central spare parts warehouse until 1992. Most buildings still exist, they now house a Coop mall. |
| T | Talegaon | Talegaon, Pune district, Maharashtra | India | Chevrolet Spark; Chevrolet Beat; Chevrolet Sail U-VA (hatchback); Chevrolet Sail | 2008 | 2020 | Closed 24 December 2020, Sold first to GWM but later sold to Hyundai |
| T | North Tarrytown Assembly | Sleepy Hollow, New York | United States | Truck and Bus. Past models: Buick Century; Pontiac 6000; Buick Skylark (rwd X-body); Buick Skylark (fwd X-body); Chevrolet 490; Chevrolet Series AA Capitol; Chevrolet Series AB National; Chevrolet Series AC International; Chevrolet Series AD Universal; Chevrolet Series AE Independence; Chevrolet Series BA Confederate; Chevrolet Standard Six; Chevrolet Series CA Eagle / Master; Chevrolet 150; Chevrolet 210; Chevrolet AK Series; Chevrolet Advance Design; Chevrolet Bel Air; Chevrolet Biscayne; Chevrolet C/K; Chevrolet C/K (Action Line); Chevrolet Caprice; Chevrolet Citation; Chevrolet Delray; Chevrolet Deluxe; Chevrolet Impala; Chevrolet Master; Chevrolet Nomad; Chevrolet Nova; Chevrolet Suburban; Chevrolet Task Force; GMC C/K (Action Line); Pontiac Phoenix (rwd X-body); Pontiac Phoenix (fwd X-body); Pontiac Ventura; Chevrolet Lumina APV; Chevrolet Lumina Minivan; Oldsmobile Silhouette; Pontiac Trans Sport | 1896; 1918 (as part of GM) | 1996 | Located at 199 Beekman Avenue. Originally built by Stanley Motor Carriage Company. In 1903, plant was sold to Maxwell-Briscoe, which later became Maxwell Motor Company. Chevrolet began to acquire the complex in 1914, before Chevrolet was part of GM. The first Chevrolet produced in Tarrytown was the Chevrolet 490. The plant became part of GM when Chevrolet became part of GM in 1918. Plant closed in June 1996. Minivan production moved to Doraville Assembly for 1997. North Tarrytown changed its name to Sleepy Hollow in December 1996. Plant was demolished. Site being redeveloped as Edge-on-Hudson, a mixed use residential/retail/office/park space. |
| | Three Rivers | Three Rivers, Michigan | United States | Rwd Automatic transmissions, propshafts | 1979 | 1994 | Located at 1 Manufacturing Way (formerly 1 Hydramatic Drive) off W. Hoffman St. GM bought the closed plant from Continental Can Co. Sold to American Axle & Manufacturing Inc. in 1994. |
| | Toledo Transmission | Toledo, Ohio | United States | Transmissions, Gears | 1916 | 1957 | Located at 900 W. Central Ave. Acquired from Warner Gear Co. by Chevrolet in 1916 before Chevrolet was part of GM. The plant became part of GM when Chevrolet became part of GM in 1918. During WWII, produced truck transfer cases and transmissions for four- and six-wheel-drive military trucks. Replaced by the current Toledo Transmission plant on Alexis Road in 1956. |
| M | Toluca Assembly | Toluca | Mexico | Chevrolet Kodiak | 1994 | 2008 | Chevrolet C/K, Chevrolet/GMC C3500HD, Chevrolet Silverado |
| | Tonawanda Forge | Tonawanda, New York | United States | Forged metal components | c.1950 | 1994 | Located at 2390-2392 Kenmore Ave. Sold to American Axle & Manufacturing Inc. in 1994. Closed in 2008, subsequently demolished. |
| | Tonawanda Foundry | Tonawanda (town), New York | United States | Iron castings of engine parts, brake drums. | 1954 | 1984 | Was located on River Road. Chevrolet Foundry. Was part of GM's Central Foundry Division. |
| Z | General Motors Turkiye Ltd. | Torbalı, İzmir Province | Turkey | Opel Vectra A & B | 1990 | 2000 | Opel plant. Converted into a spare parts warehouse. |
| | General Motors Uruguaya SA | Sayago, Montevideo | Uruguay | Chevrolet; Opel Kadett; Opel Rekord; Bedford trucks | 1962 | 1986 | |
| L | Van Nuys Assembly | Van Nuys, California | United States | Chevrolet Camaro; Pontiac Firebird | 1947 | 1992 | Located at 8000 Van Nuys Blvd. Demolished in 1993. Redeveloped into "The Plant", a retail and industrial complex that also includes LAPD and LAFD stations. Past models: Buick Apollo, Buick Skylark, Chevrolet 150, Chevrolet 210, Chevrolet Advance Design, Chevrolet Bel Air, Chevrolet C/K, Chevrolet Chevelle, Chevrolet Corvair, Chevrolet Delray, Chevrolet El Camino, Chevrolet Impala, Chevrolet Monte Carlo, Chevrolet Nomad, Chevrolet Nova (to 1979), Chevrolet Suburban, Chevrolet Task Force, GMC Sprint, Oldsmobile Omega, Pontiac GTO, Pontiac Ventura |
| 7 | Vauxhall Luton (car plant) | Luton | United Kingdom | Vauxhall Carlton; Vauxhall Cavalier; Vauxhall Cresta; Opel Vectra A Opel/Vauxhall Vectra B Vauxhall Velox; Vauxhall Ventora; Vauxhall Victor; Vauxhall Viscount; Vauxhall Viva; Vauxhall VX4/90; Vauxhall VX Series; Vauxhall Wyvern; Envoy F/FB/FC/FD; Vauxhall Slant-4 engine | 1905 | 2002 | Production ended in 2002 with the Vauxhall Vectra. The plant has now been demolished and the site is now being redeveloped for housing. |
| | GM de Venezuela; Caracas | Antimano, Caracas | Venezuela | Chevrolet Bel Air; Chevrolet C/K; Chevrolet Camaro; Chevrolet Caprice; Chevrolet Chevelle; Chevrolet Corvair; Chevrolet Deluxe; Chevrolet Impala; Chevrolet Malibu; Chevrolet Nova; Chevrolet Thriftmaster/Loadmaster; Opel Kadett; Opel Rekord | 1948 | 1983 | Plant closed in 1983 & GM moved to the newer Valencia plant that it bought from Chrysler in 1979. |
| | GM Venezolana; Mariara | Mariara, Carabobo | Venezuela | Chevrolet C3500; Chevrolet F-Series; Chevrolet E-Series; Chevrolet Kodiak; Chevrolet N-Series | 2008 | 2015 | Plant closed in 2015 & N-Series moved to Valencia plant. |
| | GM Venezolana; Valencia | Valencia, Carabobo | Venezuela | Chevrolet Astra; Chevrolet Aveo; Chevrolet C/K; Chevrolet Celebrity; Chevrolet Century; Chevrolet Chevette; Chevrolet Corsa; Chevrolet Cruze; Chevrolet Grand Blazer; Chevrolet Kodiak; Chevrolet Malibu; Chevrolet Monza; Chevrolet N-Series; Chevrolet Optra; Chevrolet Orlando; Chevrolet S-10 Blazer; Chevrolet Silverado; Chevrolet Spark; Chevrolet Tahoe; Chevrolet TrailBlazer | 1979 | 2017 | Originally built by Chrysler de Venezuela SA. GM bought the plant from Chrysler in 1979 and moved their entire operations there from the Caracas plant by 1983. There had already been production pauses because of part shortages between 2014 and 2016. On May 2, 2017 GM announced the total closure of the plant and deconsolidation of the Venezuelan unit from its accounts due to the illegal seizure of its factory by the Venezuelan government. The plant halted all of its operations of manufacturing vehicles and now only retains the GM brands representation. |
| | Warren Transmission | Warren, Michigan | United States | 6T70, 6T75, 6T80 | 1941 | 2018 | Located at 23500 Mound Road. Past transmissions: Hydramatic 4T65-E, 5ET50 EVT Began production of Face masks during the COVID-19 pandemic |
| W | Willow Run Assembly | Ypsilanti Twp, Michigan | United States | Buick Roadmaster; Chevrolet Caprice; Oldsmobile Custom Cruiser | 1959 | 1993 | Past models: Acadian, Buick Skylark, Chevrolet Citation, Chevrolet Corvair, Chevrolet Nova, Chevrolet Suburban, Oldsmobile 88, Oldsmobile Omega, Pontiac Bonneville, Pontiac GTO (1974), & Pontiac Ventura. Located at 2625 Tyler Road, to the south of the former Willow Run Transmission plant. The Willow Run Assembly Plant is now the Willow Run Business Center, a multi-tenant warehouse and distribution facility, part of which is leased by GM to distribute auto parts which is known as Ypsilanti #87 Processing Center, part of GM Customer Care and Aftersales. The nearby Willow Run Company Vehicle Operations site at 2901 Tyler Road was sold to International Turbine Industries in April 2013. |
| | Willow Run Transmission | Ypsilanti, Michigan | United States | 4L80-E transmission 4L85-E transmission 4T60-E transmission 4T65-E transmission 4T80-E transmission 6L50-E transmission 6L80-E transmission 6L90-E transmission | 1953 | 2010 | Original equipment came from destroyed Detroit Transmission plant in Livonia in 1953; began as the Ford B-24 Liberator bomber plant in World War II which opened in 1941, grew from 3,500,000 square feet to nearly 5 million square feet under GM. Ford built the factory and sold it to the US government, which leased it back to Ford for the duration of WWII. Ford Motor had first option on the plant after war production ended, an option it ultimately chose not to exercise. The factory was instead leased and then sold to Kaiser-Frazer and was their main production site from 1946 to 1953, when they moved production to Toledo, OH following Kaiser-Frazer's acquisition of Toledo-based Willys-Overland. In addition to automobiles, Kaiser-Frazer also built C-119 Flying Boxcar cargo planes at Willow Run under license from Fairchild Aircraft, producing an estimated 88 C-119s between 1951 and 1953. In 1953, GM first leased then bought the plant to replace the Detroit Transmission factory in Livonia, Michigan that had burned down earlier in 1953. In addition to automatic transmissions, GM also produced the M16A1 rifle and the M39A1 20mm autocannon for the US military during the Vietnam War at Willow Run Transmission. GM Powertrain also had an on-site engineering center. The plant closed in December 2010. A small portion of the plant was saved by the Yankee Air Museum but more than 95% of the plant was demolished from 2013 to 2014. The site has been redeveloped into the American Center for Mobility, an autonomous- and connected-driving testing center. |
| Y | Wilmington Assembly | Wilmington, Delaware | United States | Pontiac Solstice; Saturn Sky; Opel GT; Daewoo G2X | 1947 | 2009 | Located at 801 Boxwood Road. Demolished in 2019. Now an Amazon fulfillment center. Past models: Chevrolet Corsica, Chevrolet Beretta, Pontiac Tempest (Canada only), Chevrolet Malibu, Saturn L-Series, Chevrolet Chevette, Pontiac 1000, Pontiac Acadian (Canada only), Buick Centurion, Buick Electra, Buick GS, Buick Invicta, Buick LeSabre, Buick Limited, Buick Roadmaster, Buick Skylark, Buick Wildcat, Chevrolet Bel Air, Chevrolet Caprice, Chevrolet Impala, Oldsmobile 88, Oldsmobile 98, Oldsmobile Starfire, Pontiac Bonneville, Pontiac Catalina, Pontiac Star Chief, Pontiac Ventura |
| | Windsor Transmission | Windsor, Ontario | Canada | 4T40E/4T45E transmission Transmission components | 1920 | 2010 | Plant was originally in Walkerville until Walkerville was annexed by Windsor in 1935. Was located at 1550 Kildare Road. Walker Road is at the back of the property. Previous: 1920 - 1928 axles and parts, 1928 - 1963 engines (including Buick engines 1935-1942). Completely demolished by 2017. Site now occupied by MotiPark Ltd. |
| | Windsor Trim | Windsor, Ontario | Canada | Seat assemblies and door trim panels | 1965 | 1996 | Located at 1600 Lauzon Rd. Sold to Peregrine, Inc. in 1996 and then sold to Lear Corp. in 1999. Closed by Lear in 2005. Demolished in 2009. Part of the property is now the WFCU Centre and part will be residential homes. |
| | Wixom Performance Build Center | Wixom, Michigan | United States | 6.2L V8 LS3 (C6 Corvette Grand Sport coupe w/manual transmission only); 7.0L V8 LS7; 6.2L supercharged V8 LS9; 4.4L supercharged V8 LC3 | 2004 | 2013 | Located at 30240 Oak Creek Dr. Performance Build Center relocated to Bowling Green Assembly in 2014. |
| | Wyoming Assembly (LaSalle Wyoming Ave. plant) | Detroit, Michigan | United States | LaSalle 1927-1934 | 1917 | 1934 | Located at 6000 Wyoming Avenue. Originally built to produce Liberty aircraft engines in World War I. In 1919, was taken over by Saxon Motor Co., owned by Hugh Chalmers of Chalmers Motor Co. GM bought the plant in 1926 and built the LaSalle there from 1927. GM sold Wyoming Assembly to Chrysler in 1934, which then used it to build its DeSoto brand. After the DeSoto brand was discontinued in late 1960, became Wyoming Export plant which was used to prepare vehicles for export. Plant closed in 1980. Plant was demolished in 1992. |
| | General Motors Zaire | Kinshasa | Zaire (now D.R. Congo) | Chevrolet trucks Opel Kadett; Opel Rekord; Opel Commodore; Opel Ascona; Bedford Trucks | 1975 | 1987 | GM sold the plant in 1987 to local businessmen. Plant was looted bare in 1991. |

== See also ==
- Flint, Michigan auto industry
- List of former automotive manufacturing facilities
- List of Ford factories
- List of Mazda facilities
- List of Chrysler factories
- List of Fiat Group assembly sites
- History of General Motors
