= Saginaw Metal Casting Operations =

Automobile engine foundry plant in Saginaw, Michigan

Coordinates: 43.452852°N 83.9158638°W

Saginaw Metal Casting Operations is an automobile engine foundry plant in Saginaw, Michigan. Opened under GM management in 1919, the factory produces engine blocks and cylinder heads for General Motors vehicles. The factory currently occupies 1.9 million square feet on 490 acres. Historically in September 1927 it was known as the Chevrolet Grey Iron Foundry. In the past when it was called GM-Saginaw Product Company (SPC) a cloverleaf casting symbol mark was cast onto the iron component.

The location has been the primary source of engine block and cylinder heads for all of GM's engines, to include Oldsmobile, Pontiac, Cadillac, Chevrolet, Buick and GMC for most of the 20th century. The address is 1629 N Washington Ave. Saginaw, MI 48601, and is located on the Saginaw River. Camshafts, connecting rods and other internal engine components are manufactured at Bay City Powertrain. Casting operations were also provided by Massena Castings Plant and Defiance Foundry.

== Products ==
Currently, the location provides aluminum engine blocks and cylinder heads which are then assembled at Tonawanda Engine, Romulus Engine, Flint Engine South, St. Catharines Engine Plant and other engine assembly factories for the items listed below:

- 3.6L HFV6 blocks and heads

It also makes front 4WD axle assembly castings for Chevrolet Silverado 1500 and GMC Sierra 1500.

Previously:

- 2.2L/2.4L L850 engine I4 blocks
- 5.3L/6.0L Gen IV V-8 blocks and heads
- 5.3L/6.2L Gen IV V-8 block pre-machine

== See also ==
- List of GM factories
- List of GM engines

=== V8 ===
- Chevrolet big-block engine
- Chevrolet Small-Block engine
- Buick V8 engine
- Cadillac V8 engine
- GMC V8 engine
- Oldsmobile V8 engine
- Pontiac V8 engine

=== V6 ===
- Buick V6 engine

=== Straight Eight ===
- Buick Straight-8 engine
- Oldsmobile Straight-8 engine
- Pontiac straight-8 engine

=== Straight Six ===
- Chevrolet Stovebolt engine
- Chevrolet Turbo-Thrift engine
- Buick Straight-6 engine
- Oldsmobile straight-6 engine
- Pontiac straight-6 engine
