= Romulus Engine =

Automotive manufacturing facility

Coordinates: 42°15′18.51″N 83°24′10.22″W

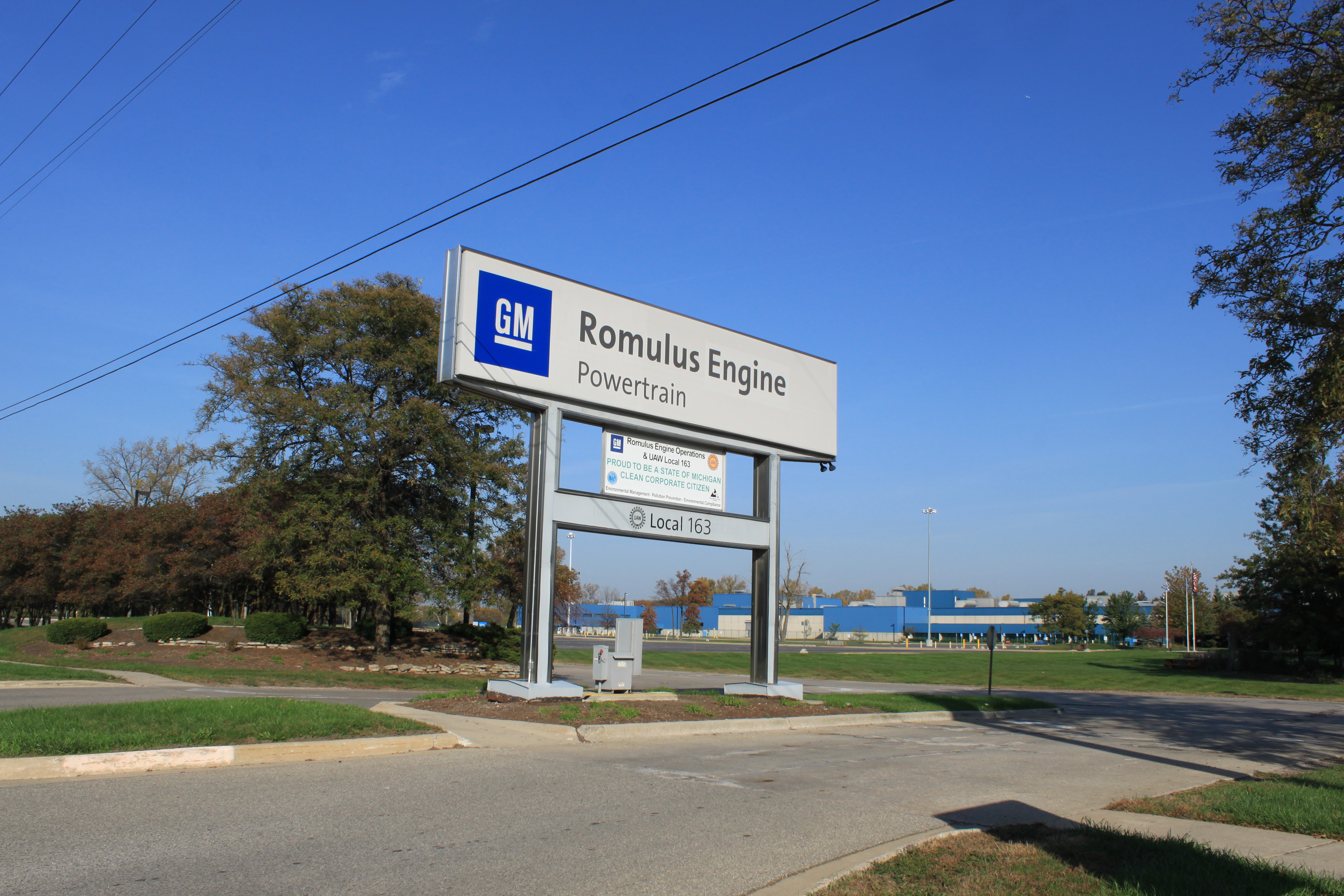
Romulus Engine plant entrance

Romulus Engine is an automobile engine plant in Romulus, Michigan. Opened in 1976, the factory produces engines for General Motors vehicles. The factory receives cast engine blocks from Defiance Foundry in Defiance, Ohio and Saginaw Metal Casting Operations in Saginaw, Michigan.

On February 19, 2019, GM announced an investment of $20 million at the plant. The facility employs 1,382 hourly workers as of 2020.

== Products ==
- HFV6 engine for Chevrolet Blazer, Colorado and Camaro, GMC Acadia and Canyon, Cadillac ATS, CTS, XT5 and CT6
- 10-speed transmission for Chevrolet Tahoe, GMC Yukon and Cadillac Escalade

== See also ==
- List of GM factories
