= Wixom Performance Build Center =

General Motors factory in Michigan, United States

- Abbreviation: PBC
- Formation: 2004; 22 years ago
- Purpose: Produce high-performance engines for GM's premier vehicles.
- Location: 30240 Oak Creek Drive Wixom, Michigan
- Coordinates: 42°30′47″N 83°32′43″W
- Region served: Worldwide
- Parent organization: General Motors
- Staff: 29

Wixom Performance Build Center (also called PBC) is a 100,000-square-foot General Motors high-performance engine factory in Wixom, Michigan.

== History ==
The facility began production in 2005 with the 7.0L LS7 for the Corvette Z06 and the 4.4L Supercharged Northstar LC3 for the STS-V and XLR-V. Due to market conditions the LC3 was discontinued after the 2009 model year.

On January 30, 2013, General Motors announced the relocation of Performance Build Center to Bowling Green Assembly Plant, effective on the first quarter of 2014.

== Investments ==
- 2004 – $10 million to produce hand-built high-performance engines.

== Products ==
- Current products:
  - 6.2L V8 LS3
  - 7.0L V8 LS7
  - Supercharged 6.2L V8 LS9
- Past Products:
  - 4.4L Supercharged Northstar LC3

=== Product applications ===
- 6.2L V8 LS3 Engine
  - Chevrolet Corvette Grand Sport
- 7.0L V8 LS7 Engine
  - Chevrolet Corvette Z06
- Supercharged 6.2L V8 LS9 Engine
  - Chevrolet Corvette ZR1

== Employee information ==
- Hourly: 18
- Salary: 11
- Union Local: UAW Local 2164
