= Lansing Engine Plant =

- Operated: 1981–2005
- Location: Delta Township, Michigan
- Coordinates: 42.7°N 84.66°W
- Industry: Automotive
- Products: Engines
- Owner: General Motors

Lansing Engine Plant was a General Motors automotive engine plant located in Delta Township, Michigan. Constructed in 1981, it was originally constructed to create diesel counterparts of GM's gasoline engines, though, by the next year, GM had abandoned the project. By 1987, the plant was producing the Quad-4 engine, and in 2002 the EcoTec engine, but was closed that same year.

GM sold the plant to Ashley Capital in 2005 who then leased it out to auto parts supplier Ryder Logistics.

== Products ==
- GM Diesel Engine: 1981-1982
- Quad-4 Engine: 1987-2002
- EcoTec Engine: 2002
