= Livonia Engine =

General Motors engine factory in Livonia, Michigan, United States (1971–2010)

Coordinates: 42°22′28″N 83°19′49″W

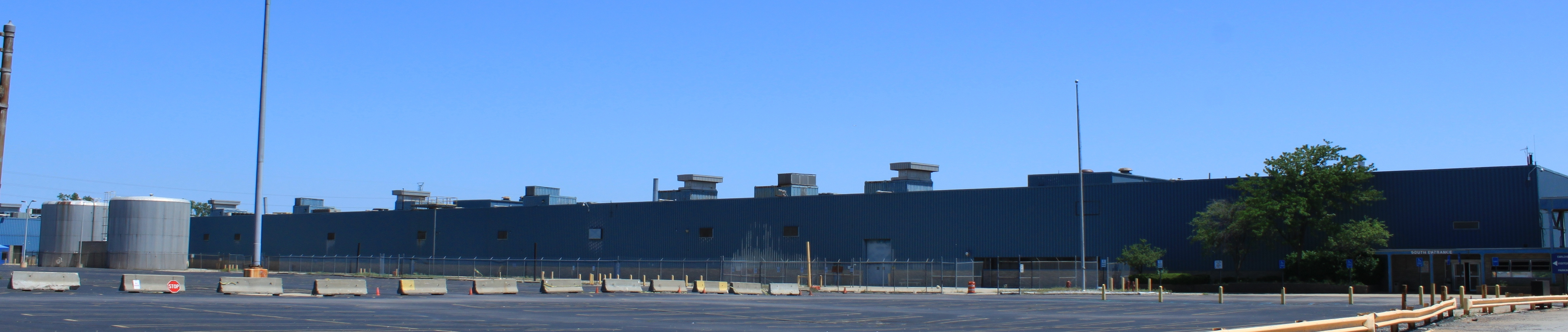

Livonia Engine was a General Motors engine factory in Livonia, Michigan, United States. It is located at 12200 Middlebelt Rd and opened in 1971. The plant closed in June 2010.

== Products ==
- GM Premium V engine
