= St. Catharines Engine Plant =

Propulsion plant in St. Catharines Ontario

St. Catharines Propulsion Plant
- Operated: 1952–present
- Location: St. Catharines, Ontario, Canada
- Coordinates: 43.1403°N 79.1861°W
- Industry: Automotive
- Products: Engines, manual transmissions
- Area: 2,000,000 sq ft (190,000 m^{2})
- Address: 570 Glendale Avenue
- Owner: General Motors Canada
- Website: gm.ca/stcatharines

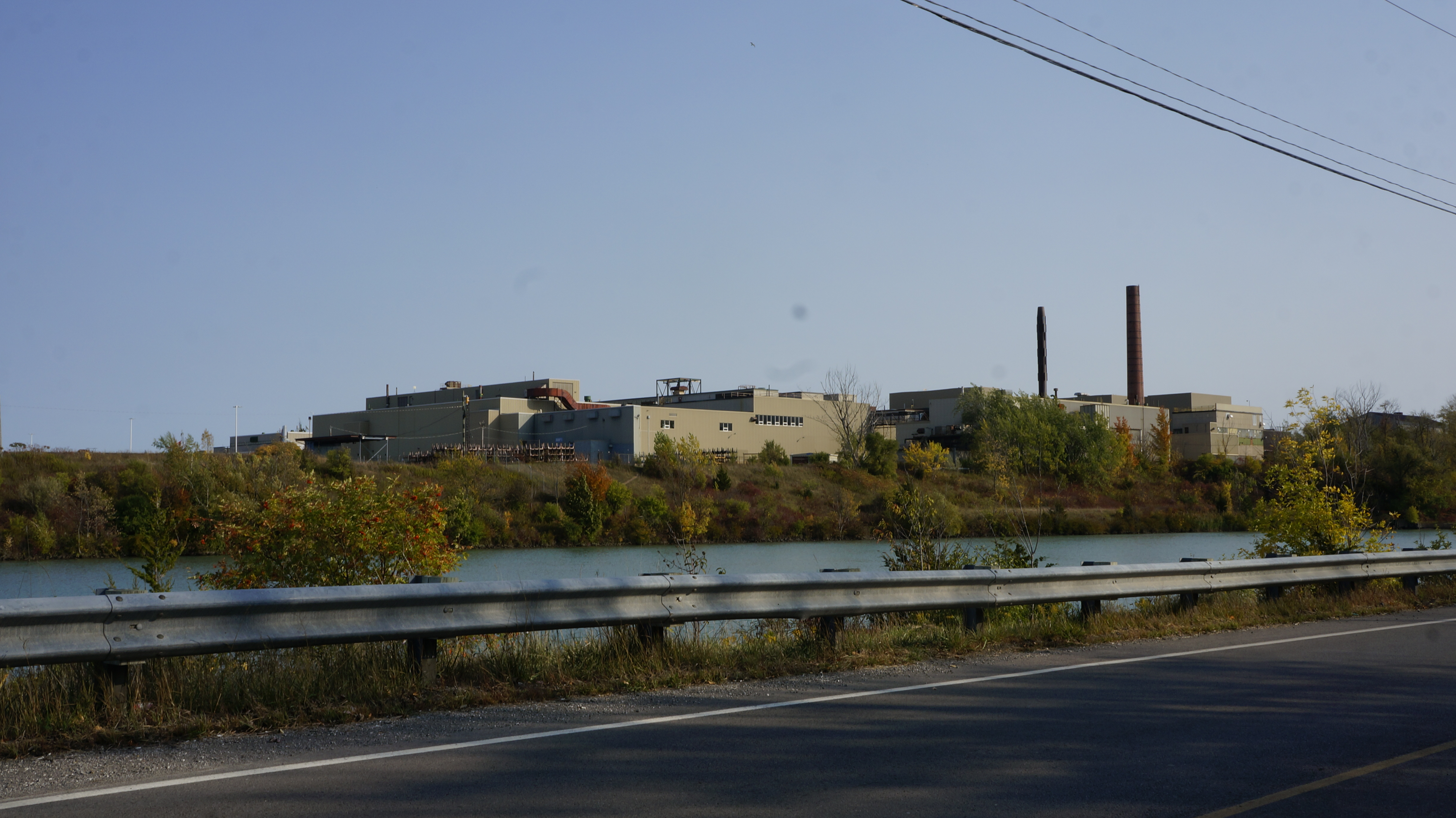
Photo of plant

St. Catharines Propulsion Plant is a General Motors Canada engine and manual transmission factory in St. Catharines, Ontario. Opened in 1954 and located on Glendale Avenue. The plant is also called St. Catharines Powertrain - Glendale Avenue Plant. The factory supports production of cast engine blocks from Defiance Foundry in Defiance, Ohio and Saginaw Metal Casting Operations in Saginaw, Michigan.

Starting in 2012, it also produces GM's six-speed transmissions.

== Products ==
=== Engines ===
- Vortec
  - 4.8 L
  - 5.3 L
- V8 Gen IV 4.8 L, 5.3 L, 6.0 L, 6.2 L, 7.0 L
- HFV6 engines 3.6 L, 2.8 L
- 6.2 L
- Engine blocks

=== Other ===
- Manual transmissions GF6, C8 Dual Clutch

== See also ==
- List of GM engines
