= Lansing Service Parts Operation =

Warehouse

Coordinates: 42°42′57.7″N 84°36′34.7″W

Lansing Redistribution Center
- Interactive map of the Lansing Redistribution Center area
- Former names: Lansing Service Parts Operation

General information
- Type: Warehouse
- Location: 4400 West Mount Hope Road, Delta charter Township, Lansing, Michigan, U.S.
- Current tenants: General Motors
- Opened: 1960; 66 years ago

Technical details
- Floor area: 2,300,000 sq ft (210,000 m^{2})

Website
- gm.com/lansingredistribution

Lansing Redistribution Center (formerly, Lansing Service Parts Operation) is a General Motors automobile parts warehouse located in Delta charter Township, Michigan at West Mount Hope Highway and Lansing Road along GTW-operated railway. The 2,300,000 sq ft (210,000 m^{2}) was originally constructed in 1959, opened in 1960 and expanded in 1964, 1965, 1969 and 1979.

It is the only General Motors warehouse that specializes in shipping parts in low demand. It had 240 employees as of 2008.

As of 2022, the warehouse had 210 employees.
