= Opel Szentgotthárd =

Manufacturing company

- Company type: Limited liability company (Korlátolt felelősségű társaság in Hungarian)
- Industry: Manufacturing
- Founded: 26 July 1990; 35 years ago
- Headquarters: Szentgotthárd, Hungary
- Key people: Grzegorz Buchal, Chairman
- Products: Engines; Transmissions
- Owner: General Motors (1990-2017); Groupe PSA (2017-2021); Stellantis (2021-present)
- Number of employees: 834
- Parent: Opel

Opel Szentgotthárd is a manufacturing company that belongs to Opel.

== History ==
The company was founded on 26 July 1990. The headquarters is in Szentgotthárd in western Hungary. In 1992, the assembly of automobiles and engines began. In 2000 the vehicle construction was stopped. In February 2016, Grzegorz Buchal succeeded Tamás Solt as chief executive officer. In March 2017, 1200 people were employed.

== Products ==
The company manufactured Opel Astra and Opel Vectra. One source gives the period 12 March 1992 to 1998 for the Astra and 1998 to 2000 for the Vectra. A total of 85,000 vehicles were built.

Engine manufacture includes both gasoline and diesel engines. According to a factory expansion announced for 2012, the engines should only be used for vehicles from Opel and Vauxhall. Almost 512,000 engines have been handed over for 1999 and 2015. The maximum value was reached in 2016 with 629,199 engines. In 2017 the number fell to 486,000 and in 2018 to 313,000.
