= Oshawa Metal =

Coordinates: 43°52′13.31″N 78°52′29.58″W

Oshawa Metal or Oshawa Metal Centre is a General Motors of Canada facility in Oshawa, Ontario.

Built in 1986 to supply metal for Chevrolet Lumina and Buick Regal made in Oshawa, the plant now makes steel used at the Oshawa Car Assembly plant and other GM customers. It is GM's only metal facility in Canada located close to an assembly plant.

The 587,000 square feet (54,500 m^{2}) facilities makes over 80,000 parts a day using 337 tons of steel a day to make 22 million parts a year.
