= GM Components Holdings =

Automotive components producer

GM Components Holdings LLC
- Company type: Limited liability company
- Industry: Automotive industry
- Founded: 2009
- Key people: Bill Shaw, General Manager; Niharika Ramdev, Vice President
- Products: automotive components
- Number of employees: 5,001-10,000
- Parent: General Motors
- Website: https://www.gm.com/company/facilities

GM Components Holdings is an automotive components producer and distributor based in the United States. It is a subsidiary of General Motors. GMCH was created in 2009 as a result of the bankruptcy filings of both Delphi Corporation and General Motors.

GMCH consists of four facilities previously owned by Delphi:

- Harrison Thermal Systems, Lockport, New York — HVAC climate control systems, powertrain cooling systems
- Rochester Powertrain, Rochester, New York — engine management systems and related products
- Wyoming Powertrain Systems Grand Rapids, Wyoming, Michigan — valve train products
- Delco Electronics and Safety, Kokomo, Indiana — automotive electronics and related products

These plants manufacture components for GM and 20 other customers.
