= Pittsburgh Metal =

Former automotive factory in Pennsylvania, U.S.

- Built: 1948–1949
- Location: West Mifflin, Pennsylvania, U.S.
- Industry: Automotive industry
- Products: Automotive parts
- Employees: 3,500 (1959 peak)
- Area: 72 acres (29 ha)
- Volume: 800,000 sq ft (74,000 m^{2})
- Address: 1451 Lebanon School Road
- Owner: General Motors (1948–2008)
- Defunct: December 12, 2008

General Motors Pittsburgh, also known as Pittsburgh Metal, was a former automotive factory held by General Motors Corporation. The 800,000 sq ft (74,000 m^{2}) plant operated from 1949 until its closure in 2008 and subsequent demolition. The plant was located at 1451 Lebanon School Road in the Pittsburgh suburb of West Mifflin, Pennsylvania, across from United States Steel's Mon Valley Works-Irvin Plant.

== History ==
=== Beginnings ===
The property for construction of the plant was purchased in 1948, and first opened in 1949 as Fisher Body Pittsburgh, serving as a stamping plant for new car parts. At its peak, the plant employed 3500 workers ten years after its opening.

Over time, GM moved stamping operations to other plants, with the majority of Pittsburgh Metal's duties supplying doors, hoods and trunk lids for the Chevrolet Cobalt, built at GM's Lordstown Assembly.

=== Closure ===
The company announced in November 2005 that it would close the West Mifflin plant in 2007 as part of its bankruptcy restructuring reported to result in the elimination of 30,000 jobs across GM's 12 plants in the United States and Canada. The closing came as a surprise to many workers, as GM had recently moved stamping tools from another plant in Lansing, Michigan for use at Pittsburgh Metal.

However, the plant would not close until 2008 while company executives and union officials tried to work together to formulate a plan to sell the factory to another owner that would keep operations consistent.

The efforts were unsuccessful, and many workers were offered work at other plants, buyouts, or retirement. On December 12, 2008, the plant ceased production. A small contingency of workers remained until mid-January to assist with physically closing the facility.

=== Aftermath ===
The property changed hands on April 1, 2011, when it was sold to a developer in St. Louis, Missouri. The plant facility was razed later that year.

The year before, Motors Liquidation Company, set up a $773 million trust fund dedicated to hazardous waste cleanup at former GM facilities in 14 states. $3.3 million of that sum was dedicated to cleanup of the West Mifflin plant, as it was the lone GM plant in Pennsylvania.

As of 2026, the property is occupied by Copart as an automobile auction lot.
