= List of GMC vehicles =

The American automobile manufacturer GM has sold a number of trucks and SUVs under its marque GMC, which began being applied in 1912. The vast majority of GMC vehicles are based upon the same platforms as, or simply rebadged from, vehicles sold in the Chevrolet division of GM.

== Current production vehicles ==
Model	Calendar year introduced	Current model		Vehicle description
Model	Calendar year introduced	Introduction	Update/facelift	Vehicle description
SUVs/Crossovers
Acadia	2006	2023	–	Full-size crossover SUV. Closely related to the Chevrolet Traverse.
Hummer EV SUV	2023	2023	–	Off-road full-size electric SUV. First use of the Hummer brand since its discontinuation in 2010.
Terrain	2009	2025	–	Compact crossover SUV. Closely related to the Chevrolet Equinox.
Yukon	1992	2021	2025	Full-size body-on-frame SUV. Available in rear-wheel drive or four-wheel drive. Closely related to the Chevrolet Tahoe and Cadillac Escalade.
Yukon XL	2000	2021	2025	Extended-wheelbase version of the Yukon. Closely related to the Chevrolet Suburban and Cadillac Escalade ESV. Formerly the Suburban until 2000.
Pickup trucks
Canyon	2003	2023	–	Mid-size pickup truck. Closely related to the Chevrolet Colorado.
Hummer EV Truck	2021	2021	–	A Pickup truck version of the Hummer EV.
Sierra	1988	2019	2022	Full-size pickup truck. Available in models 1500, 2500 and 3500 with an upscale Denali trim available. Closely related to the Chevrolet Silverado.
Sierra EV	2023	2023	–	A battery electric pickup truck. Related to Chevrolet Silverado EV.
Vans
Savana	1996	1996	2003	Full-size van, a rebadged and restyled Chevrolet Express.

== Former production vehicles ==
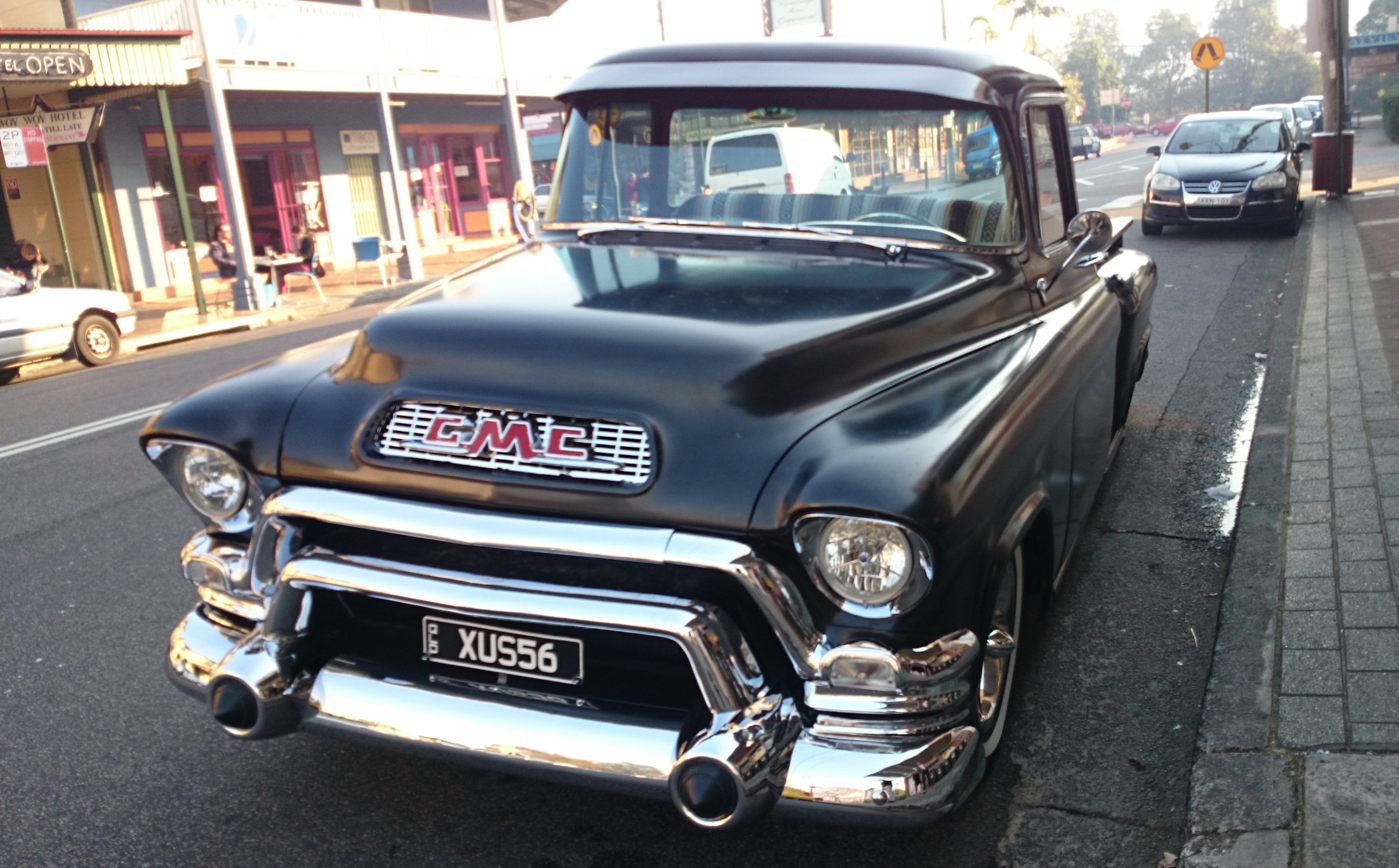
1959 GMC Blue Chip Series

=== Light-duty trucks ===
- C/E Series
- "New Design" Series
- "Blue Chip" Series
- C/K Series
- Sprint
- Caballero
- S-15
- Sonoma
- Syclone

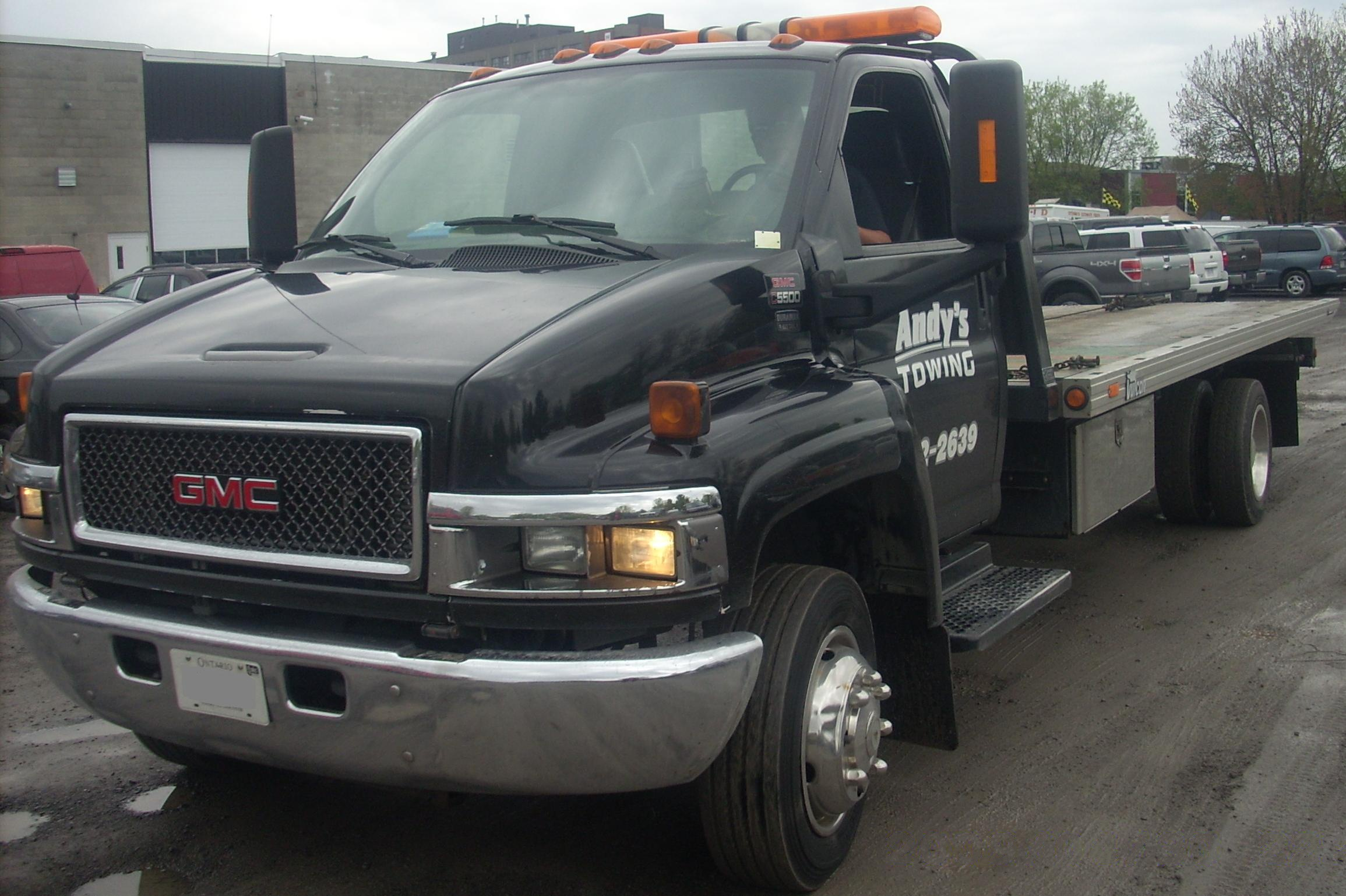
2007 GMC TopKick

=== Medium-duty trucks ===
- L-Series
- GMC 5500
- C-Series
- Forward
- W-Series
- T-Series
- TopKick

=== Heavy-duty trucks ===
- 7500
- 9500
- Astro
- General
- Brigadier

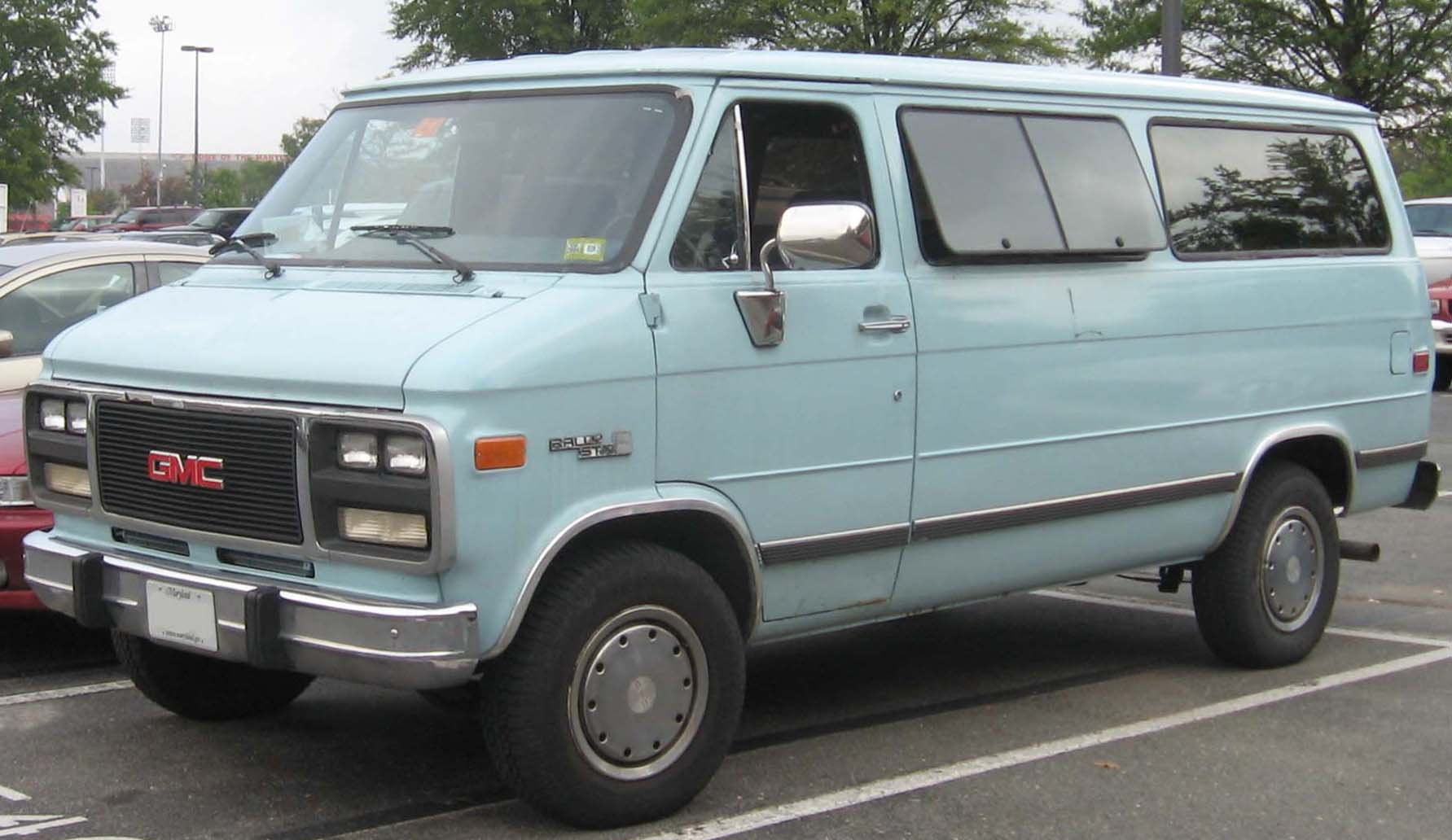
1994 GMC Vandura

=== Vans ===
- Handi-Van
- Handi-Bus
- Rally
- Vandura
- Safari

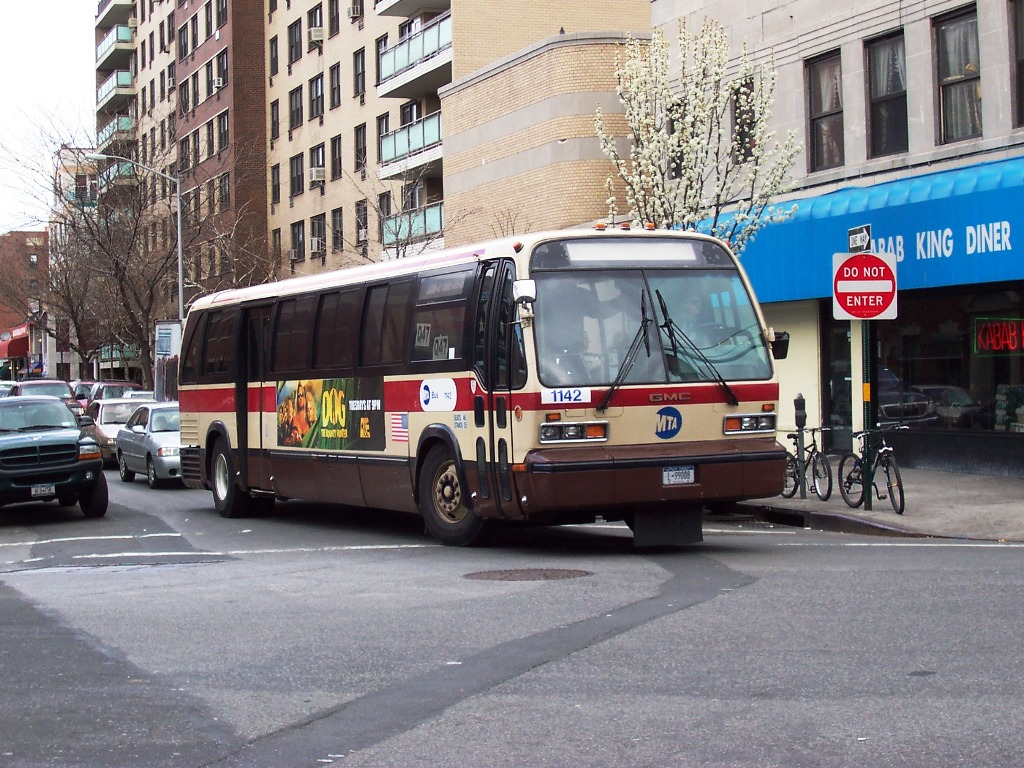
2006 GMC RTS

=== Buses ===
- P-Series
- "Old Look"
- "New Look"
- RTS
- Classic
- B-Series
- S-Series

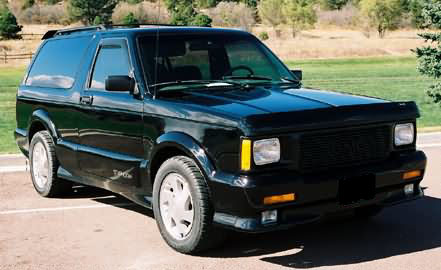
1992 GMC Typhoon

=== SUVs ===
- Suburban
- Jimmy
- S-15 Jimmy
- Tracker
- Typhoon
- Envoy

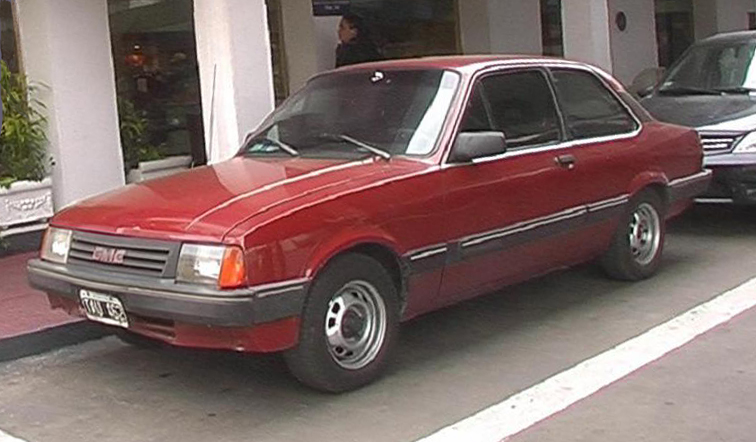
1993 GMC Chevette

=== Sedans ===
- Chevette

=== Military vehicles ===
- CCKW
- AFKWX
- DUKW

== Concept vehicles ==
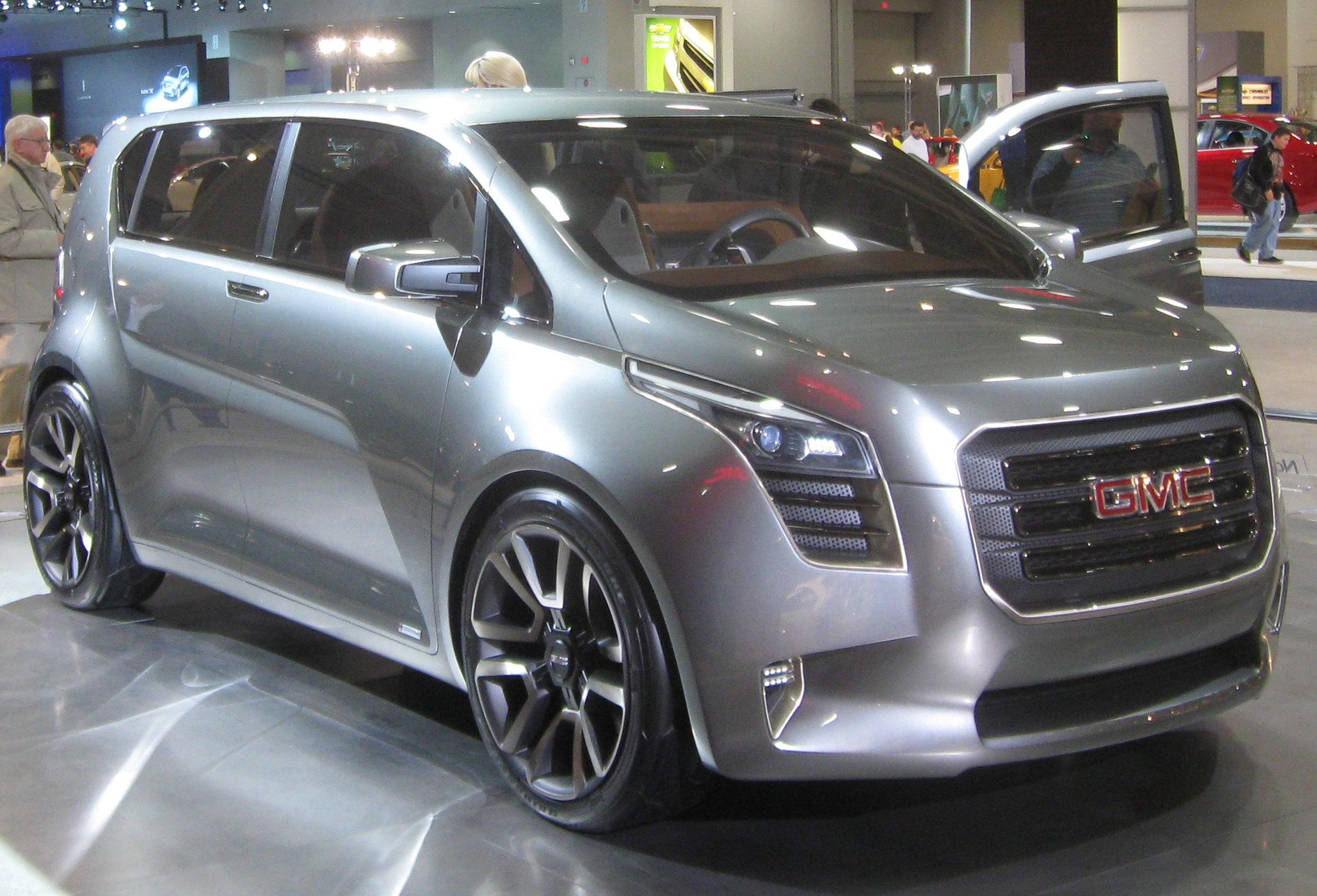
2010 GMC Granite

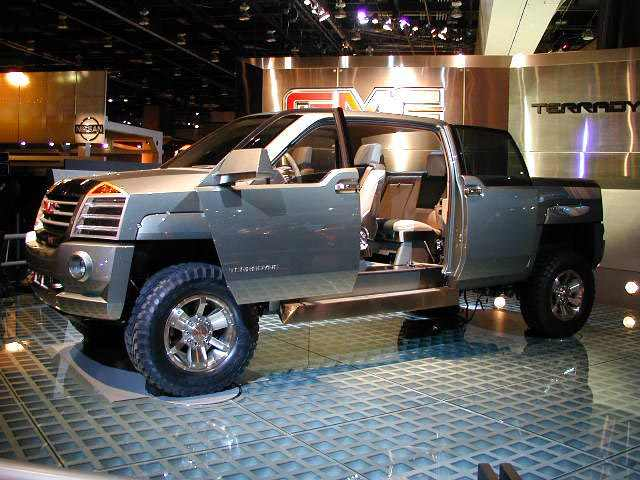
2000 GMC Terradyne

- 1955 L'Universelle
- 1988 Sierra CART/PPG pace truck
- 1988 Sierra A/R 400
- 1989 Syclone
- 1989 Centaur
- 1989 Kalahari
- 1990 Transcend
- 1990 Mahalo
- 1991 Rio Grande
- 1991 Sagebrush
- 2000 Terradyne
- 2001 Terracross
- 2002 Terra 4
- 2005 Graphyte
- 2006 PAD
- 2008 Denali XT
- 2010 Granite
- 2010 Granite CPU
- 2011 Sierra All Terrain HD
- 2026 Hummer X truck/SUV

== See also ==
- GMC
- General Motors
- Chevrolet
- Badge engineering
