= Chevrolet Kodiak =

Series of medium-duty trucks by General Motors

Chevrolet Kodiak/GMC TopKick
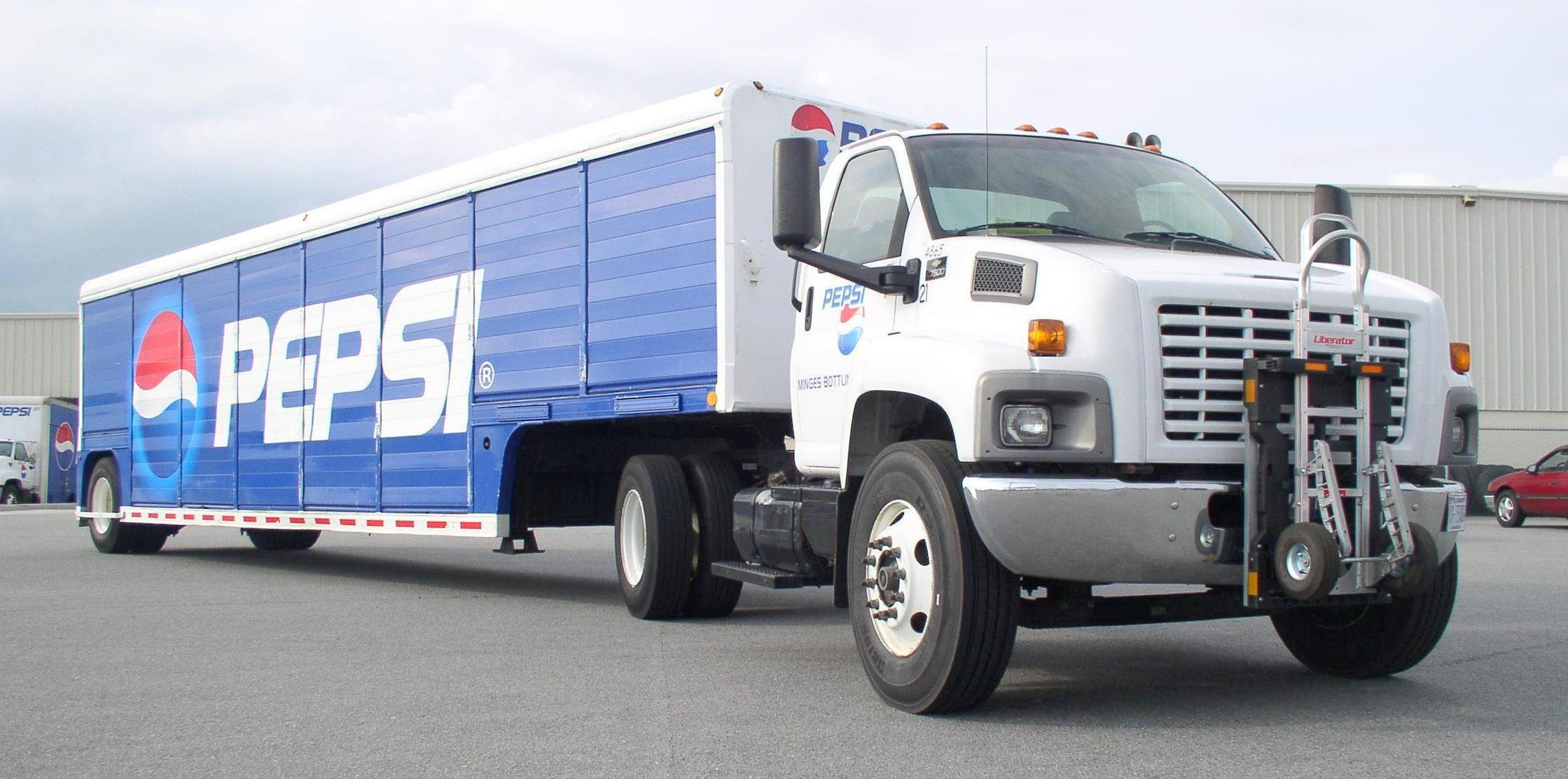

Overview
- Manufacturer: General Motors
- Production: 1980–2009
- Assembly: Pontiac, Michigan; Flint, Michigan; Toluca, Mexico; Bogotá, Colombia; Valencia, Venezuela; Janesville, Wisconsin; São José dos Campos, Brazil (GMC 12-170/14-190/16-220)

Body and chassis
- Class: Medium-duty truck
- Layout: Longitudinal front engine, rear-wheel drive / four-wheel drive

Chronology
- Successor: Chevrolet Silverado (Medium Duty)

The Chevrolet Kodiak and GMC TopKick are a range of medium-duty trucks that were produced by the Chevrolet and GMC divisions of General Motors from 1980 to 2009. Introduced as a variant of the medium-duty C/K truck line, three generations were produced. Slotted between the C/K trucks and the GMC Brigadier Class 8 conventional, the Kodiak/TopKick were developed as a basis for vocationally oriented trucks, including cargo haulers, dump trucks, and similar vehicles; on later generations, both cutaway and cowled-chassis variants were produced for bus use.

Following years of declining market share, General Motors (in line with Ford Motor Company) sought to exit heavy-truck manufacturing. After struggling to enter joint ventures or sell the rights to its product line, the company ended production of the Kodiak and TopKick in 2009. The final medium-duty truck, a GMC TopKick 5500, rolled out of Flint Truck Assembly on July 31, 2009.

For the 2019 model year, after a ten-year hiatus, General Motors re-entered the conventional medium-duty truck segment. Developed in a joint venture with Navistar International, the Chevrolet Silverado 4500/5500/6500HD is a Class 4–6 vehicle. Slightly smaller than the Kodiak/TopKick, the 4500/5500/6500HD is marketed exclusively as a Chevrolet (with no GMC counterpart).

== First generation (1981–1990) ==
First generation (C70/C7000)
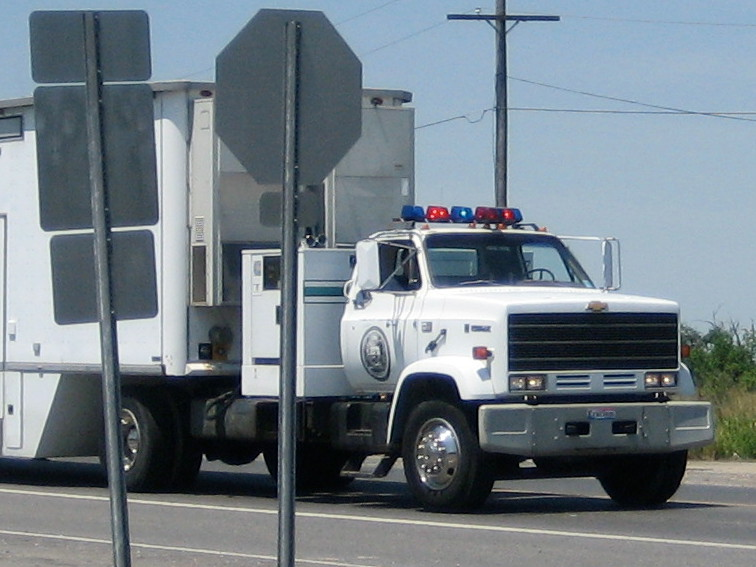
- 1980–1989 Chevrolet Kodiak towing mobile police command post

Overview
- Production: 1980–1989
- Model years: 1981–1990
- Assembly: Pontiac, Michigan: Pontiac East Assembly (1980–1985); Pontiac Central Assembly (1985–1989); Bogotá, Colombia (GM Colmotores)

Body and chassis
- Class: Class 7
- Body style: 2-door truck
- Related: Chevrolet C/K ("Rounded Line") medium-duty

Powertrain
- Engine: 10.4 L (636 cu in) Caterpillar 3208 turbodiesel V8
- Transmission: 5-speed manual 5-speed manual × 4-speed auxiliary (20-speed); 10-speed manual 13-speed manual 4-speed automatic 5-speed automatic

Dimensions
- Wheelbase: 137–254 in (3,480–6,452 mm)
- Length: 213.8–383 in (5,431–9,728 mm)
- Height: 100 in (2,540 mm)

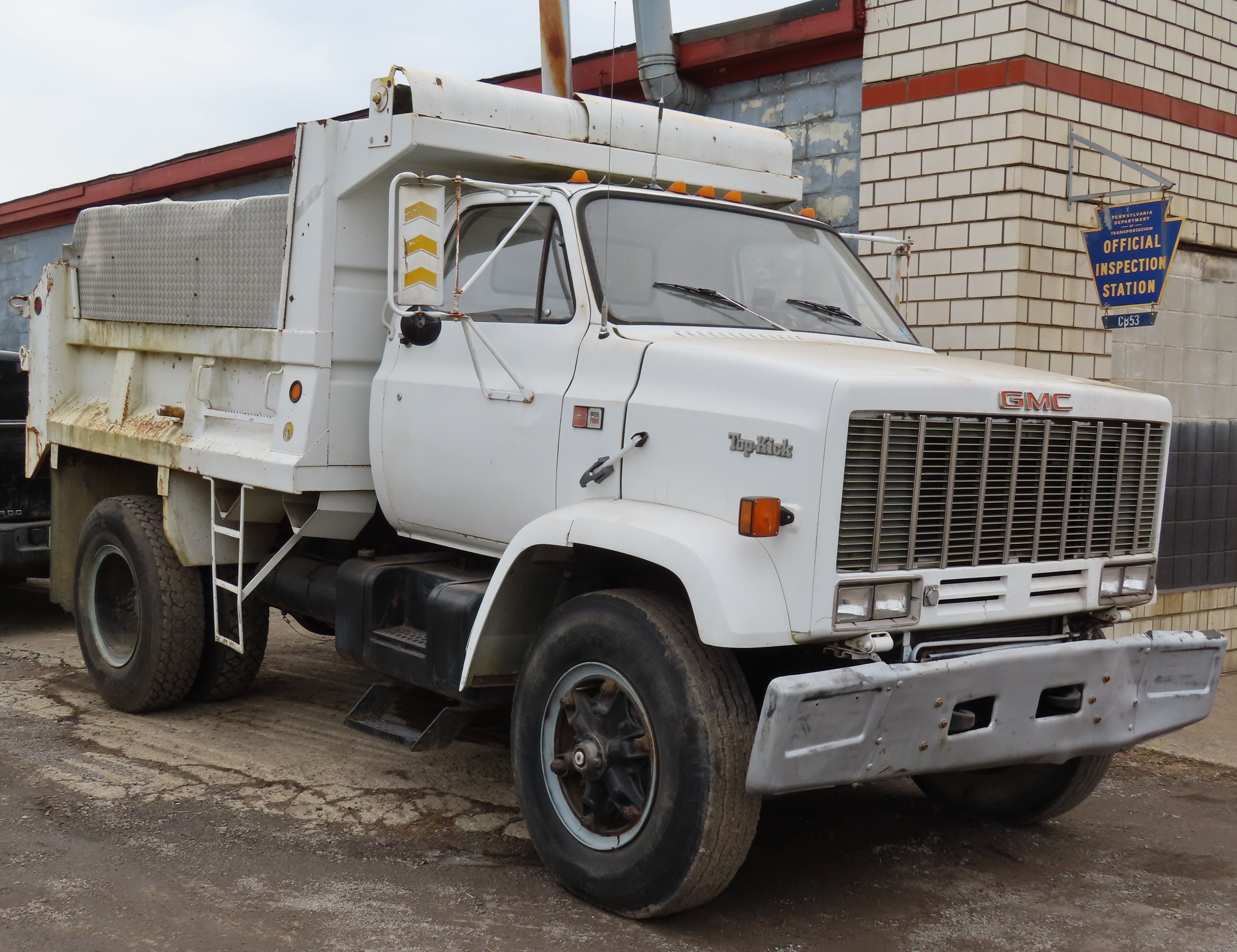
1980–1989 GMC TopKick C7000

For 1981, General Motors introduced the Chevrolet Kodiak and GMC TopKick (officially designated the Chevrolet C70/GMC C7000) series of Class 7 trucks. The largest versions of the medium-duty C/K series, the Kodiak/TopKick were developed to accommodate the Caterpillar 3208 V8 diesel (sourced from the larger Chevrolet Bruin/GMC Brigadier). To fit the new engine (which used a larger radiator), a taller hood (repositioning the headlamps below the grille) was designed, requiring the cab to be mounted several inches higher. Though taller, the new hood design was shorter in length, reducing the BBC length from 98 to 92 inches.

In line with the Bruin/Brigadier, the Kodiak was offered with both single and tandem-axle drive configurations; both straight truck and semitractor configurations were produced. The Kodiak name followed the Chevrolet "frontier beast" naming tradition for its heavy conventionals (Chevrolet Bison and Chevrolet Bruin) while the GMC TopKick was a military slang term (following GMC Brigadier and GMC General).

Following Chevrolet's retirement from the Class 8 truck segment after 1981, the Class 7 Kodiak became the largest truck offered by Chevrolet, while the TopKick remained slotted below the Brigadier.

== Second generation (1990–2002) ==
Second generation (GMT530)
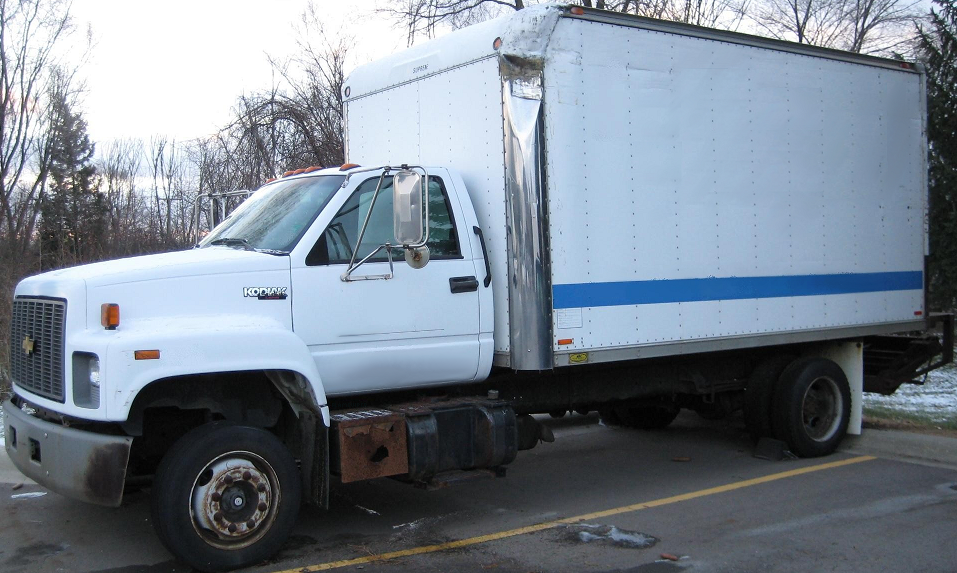
- 1990–1995 Chevrolet Kodiak

Overview
- Production: August 28, 1989 – June 26, 2002
- Model years: 1990–2002
- Assembly: Janesville, Wisconsin; Toluca, Mexico (1994–2008); Bogotá, Colombia; Valencia, Venezuela; São José dos Campos, Brazil (GMC 12-170/14-190/16-220)

Body and chassis
- Body style: 2-door truck 4-door truck
- Platform: GMT530

Powertrain
- Engine: Gasoline: 6.0 L Mark IV/Gen V 366 V8; 7.0 L Mark IV 427 V8; 7.4 L L19/L21 V8; 8.1 L Vortec L18 V8; Diesel: 6.6 L Caterpillar 3116 I6; 7.2 L Caterpillar 3126B/E I6

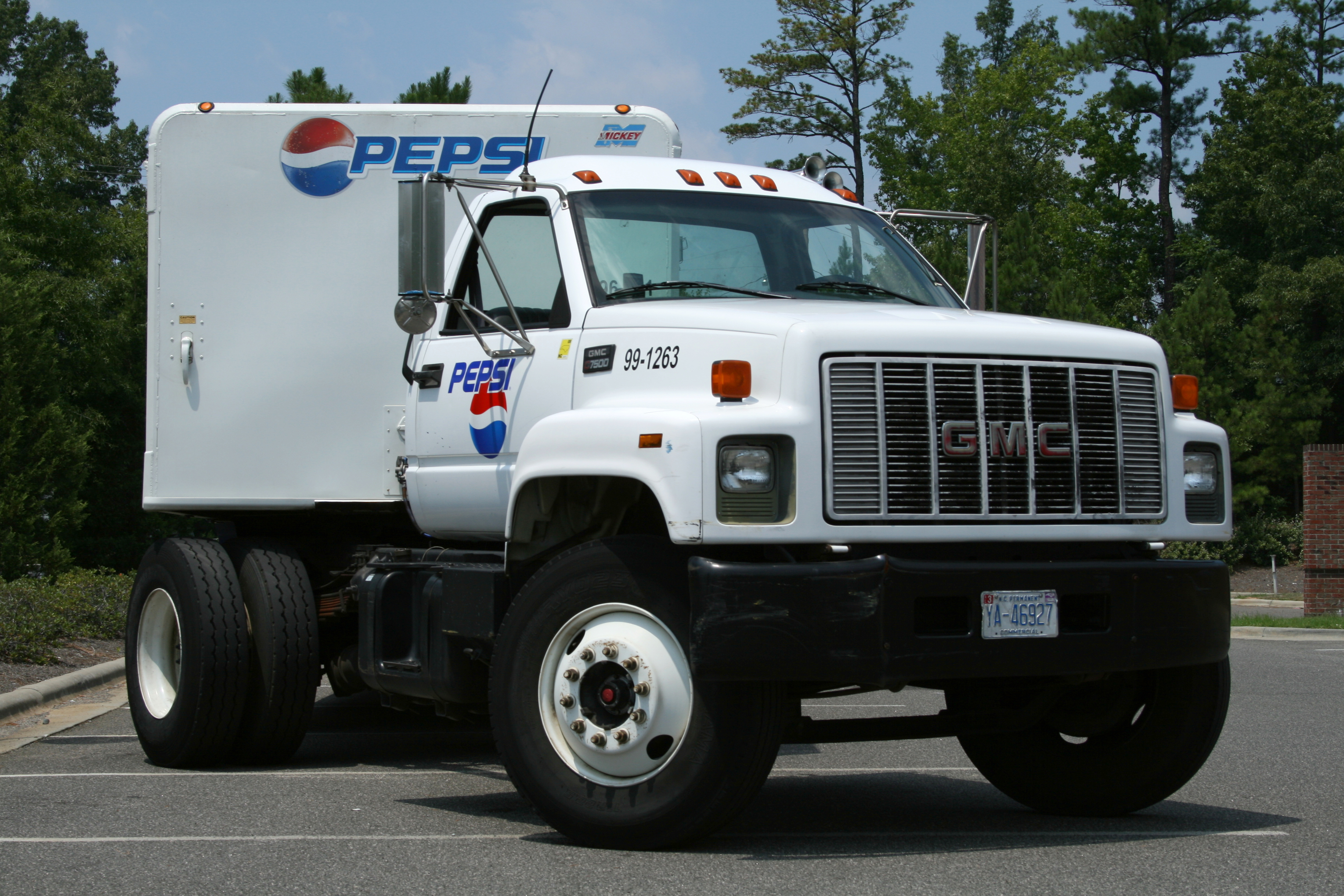
GMC TopKick with raised-roof cab

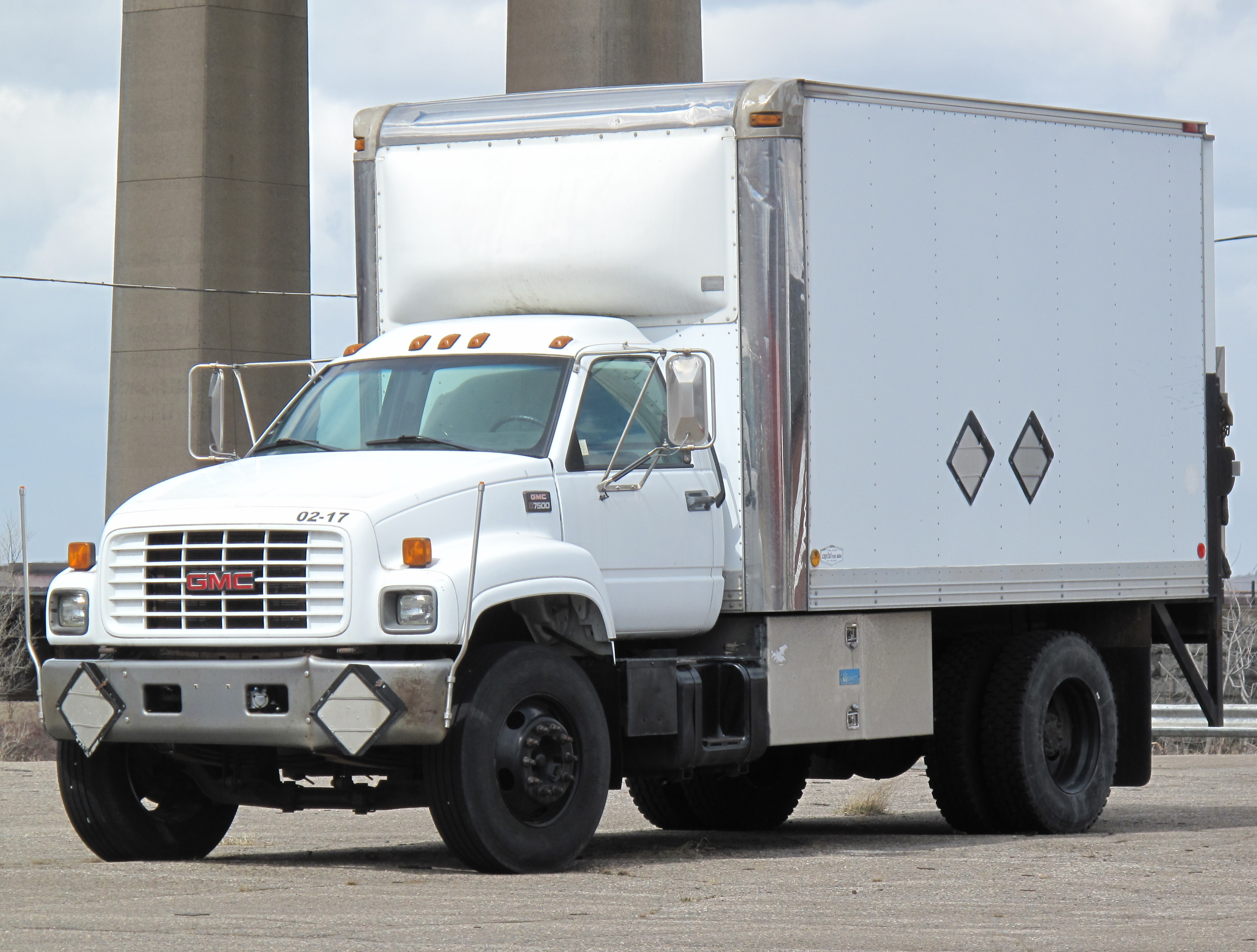
GMC TopKick with the optional sloped hood

For 1990 production, GM released the second generation of the Kodiak/TopKick on the GMT530 architecture. After 1988, General Motors had ended heavy-truck production (replaced by Volvo GM-designed WhiteGMC vehicles), with the GMT530 trucks now becoming the largest vehicles assembled by the company. The Kodiak/TopKick nameplates now encompassed the entire GM medium-duty range, as the GMT400 C/K series (introduced for 1988) topped out with 1-ton 3500-series trucks.

Over its thirteen-year production run, the GMT530 platform underwent relatively few changes. As medium-duty trucks did not require airbags, the interior of the cab was retained through its entire production run. For 1997, a lower-profile "aerodynamic" hood became available (not offered on C8500 models, severe-service, or school bus applications). Models equipped with this hood featured C5500–C8500 badging rather than Kodiak/TopKick badging, a change which extended to standard hood models for 1998, effectively bringing the medium-duty trucks in line with the rest of the C/K naming convention.

Janesville Assembly produced GMT530 trucks for North America from 1989 to 2002, with export production sourced from Toluca Assembly in Toluca, Mexico from 1994 to 2008. For Latin America, GMT530 trucks were assembled locally in Brazil (sourcing components from Mexico); all Brazil-produced units were fitted with Caterpillar 3116 engines. Brazil-market vehicles were badged according to their gross vehicle weight rating (GVWR) in metric tons and rounded horsepower output (12-170=12 tons-170hp, 14-190=14 tons-190hp, and 16-220=16 tons-220hp).

In May 2021, the final GMT530-based vehicle built at the Janesville plant was put up for auction. The 2002 GMC C8500 tandem-axle dump truck, built on June 26, 2002, was owned and operated by the city of Janesville for nearly 20 years prior to the sale. The vehicle bore the signatures of numerous former employees of the plant.

=== Design overview ===
In line with the previous generation, the GMT530 trucks derived their cabs from the GMT400 platform (introduced in 1988) to lower the costs of tooling. In contrast to the previous short-hood Kodiak/TopKick, the GMT530 generation was configured only with a single hood length. Skipping the 4500 series altogether, the GMT530 trucks were offered in 5500, 6500, and 7500-series payload series. Initially, Chevrolet offered base and Silverado trims while GMC offered SL and SLE trims; for 1994, distinct trim levels were phased out from all GMT530 trucks.

For 1991, a raised-roof cab was introduced as an option for higher headroom. For 6500-series trucks, a "Lo-Pro" design configuration was introduced, using 19.5-inch wheels (rather than 22.5) and other design modifications to lower the frame approximately 5 inches; the configuration was marketed primarily for rental vehicles (such as U-Haul) and delivery vehicles. Following its introduction for GMT400 trucks, a 4-door crew cab became an option after 1992.

For 1997, GM introduced a C8500-series variant of the GMT530. A Class 8 truck, the C8500 was offered with either single or tandem rear axles, taking over the role left vacant by the departure of the GMC Brigadier and General after 1988. The same year, all GMT530 trucks received anti-lock brakes for all wheels.

As the GMT530 replaced both the Kodiak/TopKick and the medium-duty C/K, the model line introduced a series of engine options, with gasoline engines becoming standard equipment. The large-block 6.0L (standard) and 7.0L (optional) V8s returned from the previous medium-duty trucks; both engines were upgraded with fuel injection. Both engines were replaced by a 7.4L V8 for 1999, which was replaced by a 8.1L Vortec V8 for 2001 (the largest-displacement V8 ever offered in a mass-produced Chevrolet). Coinciding with the retirement of the Caterpillar 3208 V8 and the Detroit Diesel 8.2L V8 diesel engines, the GMT530 introduced a 6.6L Caterpillar 3116 inline-6 turbodiesel (165hp; 170hp from 1991). For 1997, larger GMT530 trucks received an additional option of a 7.2L Caterpillar 3126 inline-6.

=== Medium-duty COE (1998-2009) ===
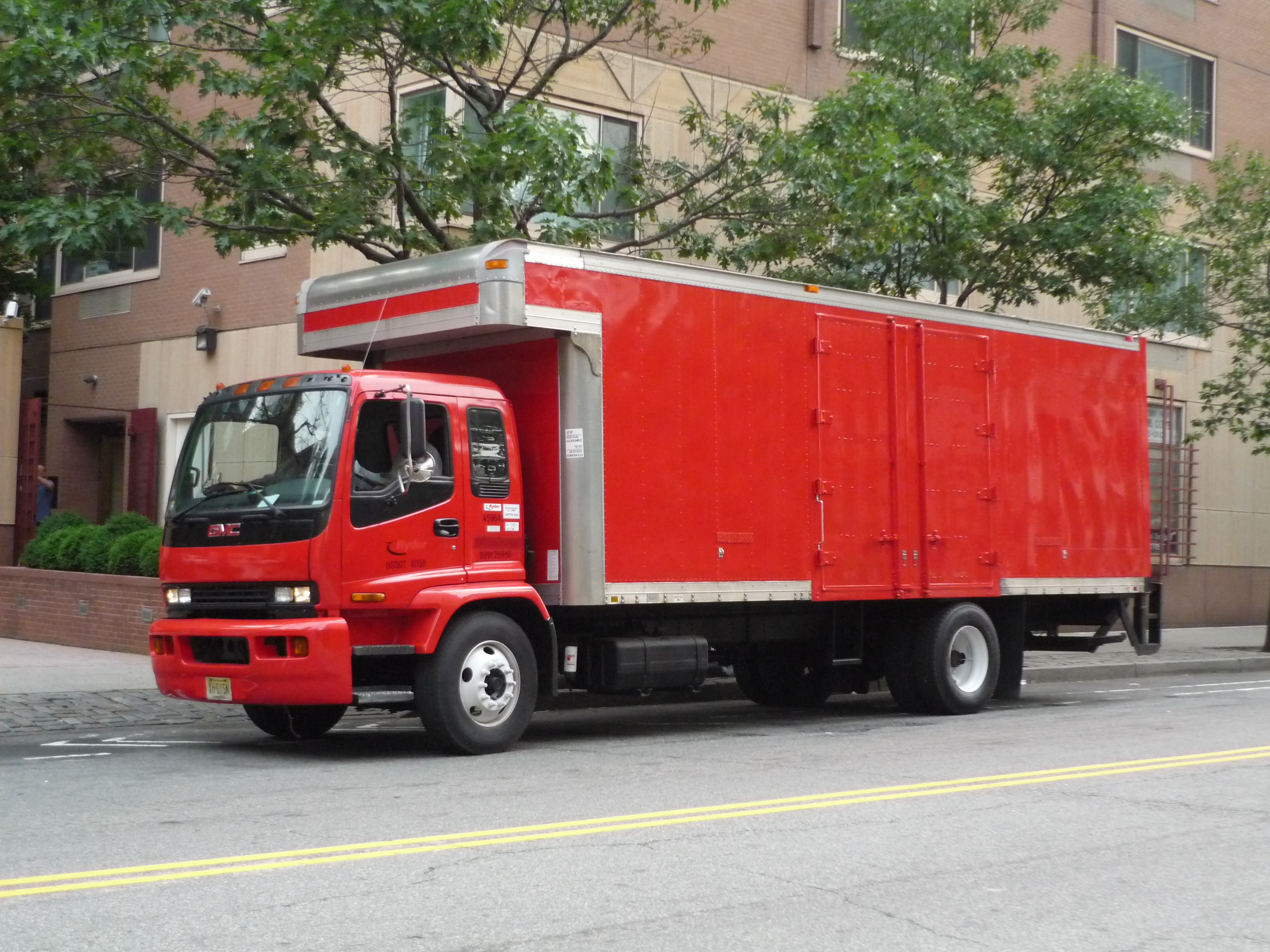
GMC T7500. The T-Series is a high-cab COE using the GMT530 chassis.

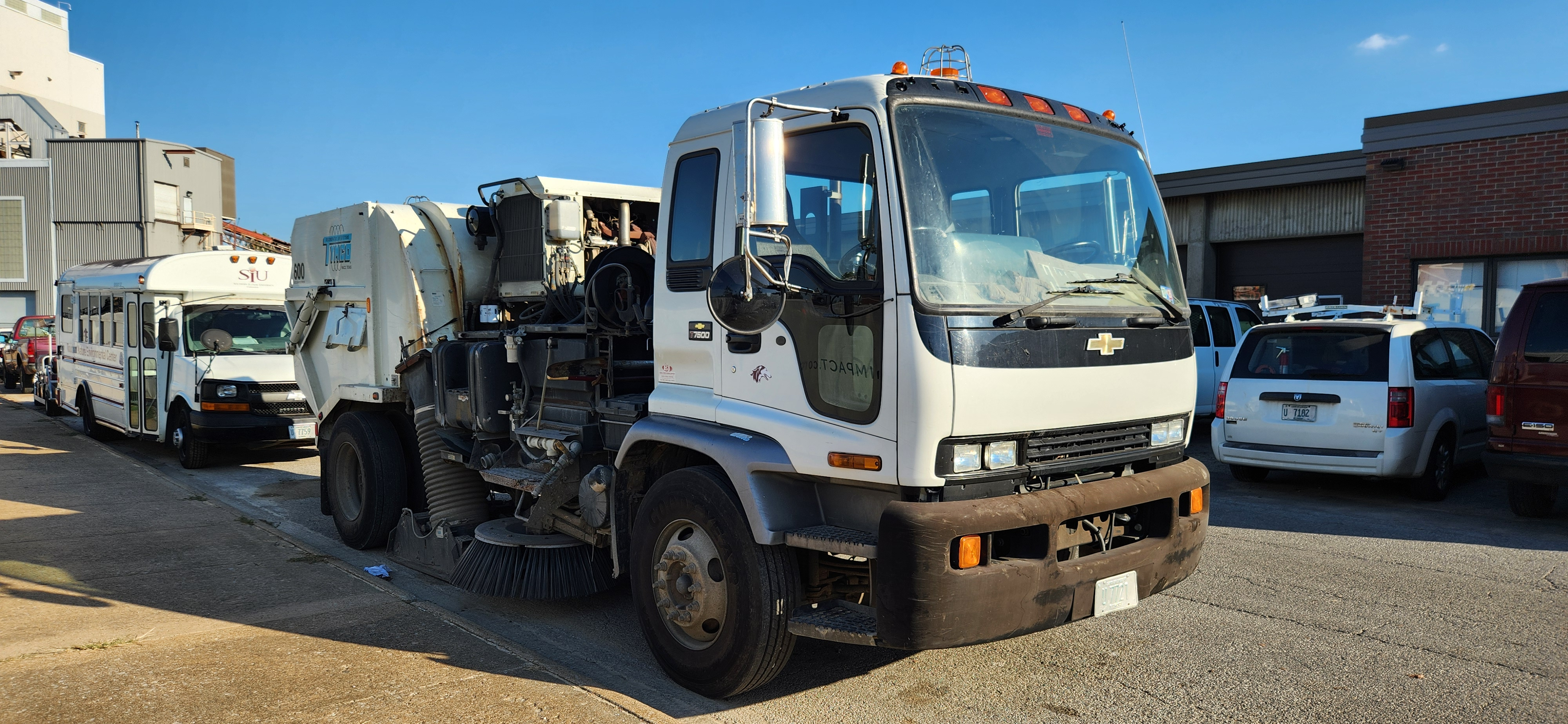
Chevrolet T7500 converted into a street sweeper

For 1998 production, General Motors introduced the T-series medium-duty COE trucks (replacing the previous W-series "Forward" medium-duty COEs). Slotted above vehicles sharing commonality with the Isuzu N-Series/Elf, medium-duty COEs sourced their cabs from the Isuzu Forward, combining them with GMT530 chassis and powertrains.

Sized above the smaller W-series (derived from the Isuzu NPR), the T-series was offered in 6500-series to 8500-series variants. Outliving its conventional-cab counterpart by seven years, the GMT530 medium-duty COEs were among the final vehicles produced by Janesville Assembly (as part of the General Motors-Isuzu commercial truck partnership).

== Third generation (2003–2009) ==
Third generation (GMT560)
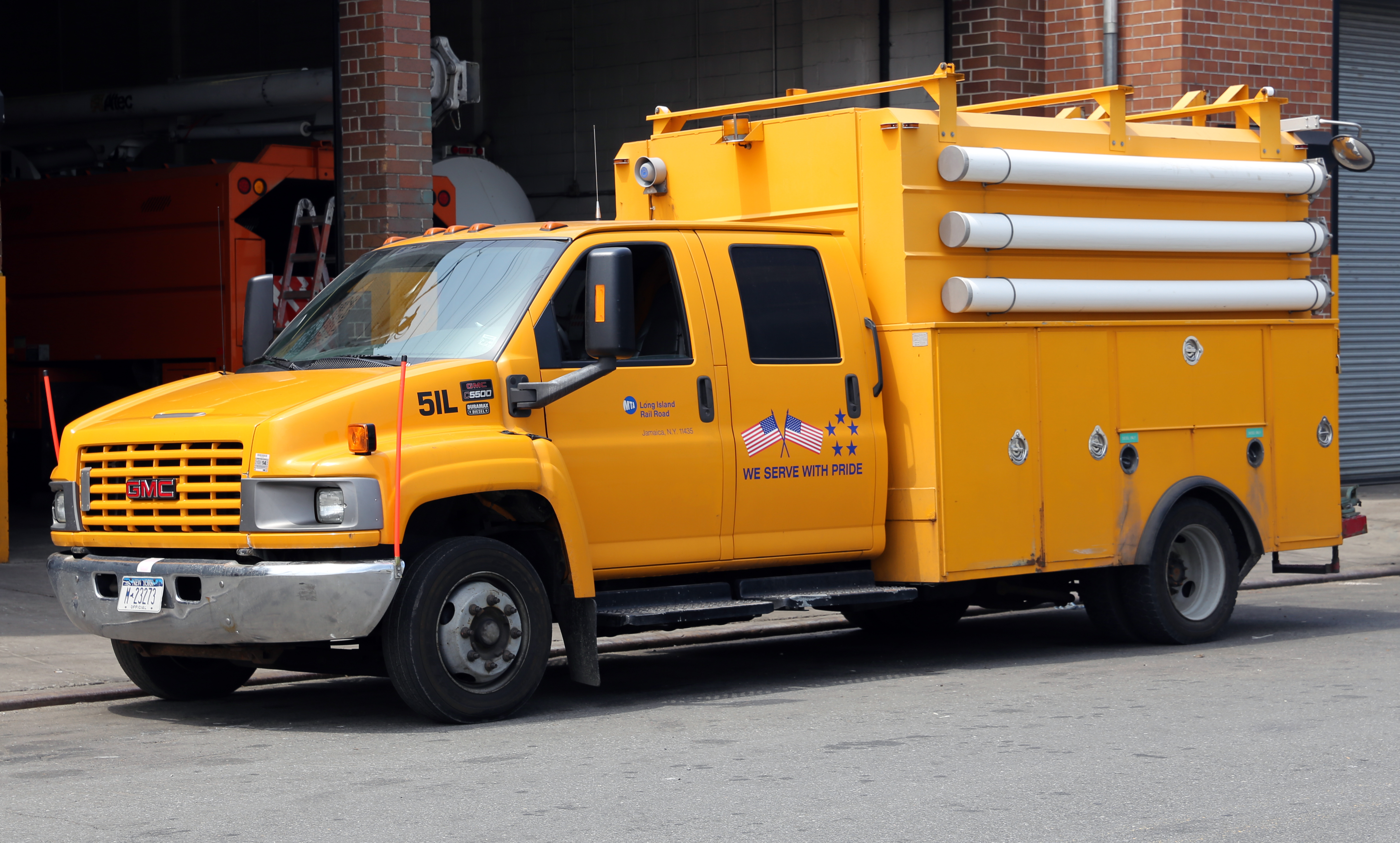
- GMC TopKick C5500 crew cab utility vehicle

Overview
- Also called: Isuzu H-Series
- Production: 2002–2009
- Model years: 2003–2010
- Assembly: Flint, Michigan (Flint Truck Assembly)

Body and chassis
- Body style: 2-door truck 4-door truck 2-door cutaway
- Platform: GMT560
- Related: Chevrolet Express/GMC Savana

Powertrain
- Engine: Diesel: 6.6 L Duramax V8; 7.2 L Caterpillar C7 I6; 7.8 L LG4 I6; Gasoline: 8.1 L L18 V8
- Transmission: 5-speed manual 6-speed manual 9-speed manual 10-speed manual 5-speed automatic 6-speed automatic

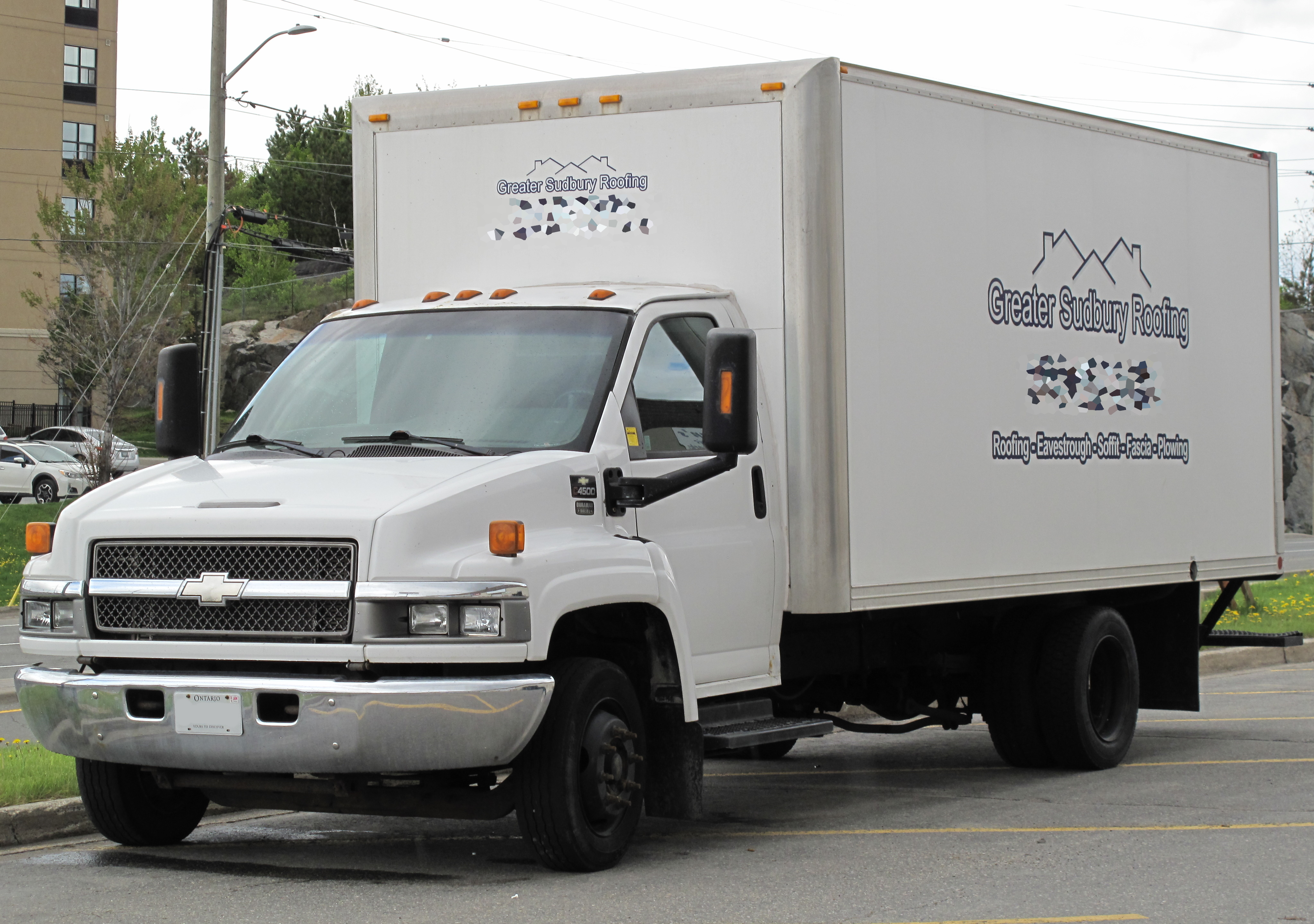
Chevrolet Kodiak C4500 with optional Deluxe Front Appearance Package

For 2003, General Motors released the third-generation Chevrolet Kodiak/GMC TopKick under the GMT560 architecture. In line with GM light-duty truck lines, the Cx500 nomenclature returned, now secondary to the previous Kodiak and TopKick nameplates. Showcased as part of the redesign was a change in the design layout of the model line.

To better compete with the better-selling International DuraStar and Freightliner Business Class M2 medium-duty truck ranges, the GMT560 trucks moved away from a pickup truck-based cab to a design derived from the Chevrolet Express/GMC Savana full-size van. The move to a vertically oriented cab (replacing the previous raised-roof design) increased cab space with a lower cab floor; larger doors allowed for better entry and exit.

In addition to the return of the 8500-series Class 8 truck, a smaller GMT560 truck was introduced, with a C4500 replacing the GMT400-based C3500HD. C4500 and C5500-series trucks were fitted with a lower-profile hood and smaller grille than the C6500-8500 series, which featured a relatively straight hoodline. On all versions, a "Deluxe Front Appearance Package" was an option, featuring a chrome-trim mesh grille (also offered as a freestanding option) and chrome bumper; on C4500 and C5500 models, the option included chrome-trimmed quad headlamps.

On the GMT560 platform, the powertrain was dependent on the payload series. On C4500/5500s, the 8.1L gasoline V8 returned from the GMT530 generation as the standard engine; the Caterpillar 3116 was replaced by an Isuzu-designed 6.6L Duramax diesel V8. For the C6500 and larger, diesel engines were standard, with an Isuzu-produced Duramax LG4 7.8L I6 as standard, with a 7.2L Caterpillar C7 (a redesigned 3126) offered as an option.

=== Isuzu H-Series ===
For 2003, Isuzu released the H-Series, a conventional-cab truck derived from the 6500/7500-series GMT560 chassis. Intended largely for vocational applications, the H-Series was marketed as a competitor for Hino 600 and Freightliner M2.

Differing from the Kodiak and TopKick only by its manufacturer grille badging, the H6500/H7500 was powered by the 7.8L Duramax inline-six, shared by the Kodiak/TopKick and Chevrolet/GMC T-series trucks (a medium-duty COE combining the cab of the Isuzu Forward and the GMT530 chassis).

As of current production, the H-Series is the first (and only) conventional-cab truck ever sold by Isuzu in North America.

== Discontinuation and replacement ==
During the 2000s, medium-duty trucks produced by Big Three automakers (specifically, GM and Ford) began to decline in market share against trucks produced by manufacturers with product lines consisting solely of commercial vehicles. As the decade progressed, General Motors sought to divest its interests in commercial truck production, beginning discussions with longtime partner Isuzu and major competitor Navistar. Though a tentative agreement to sell its commercial truck line to Navistar was reached at the end of 2007, the sale collapsed in mid-2008.

Coinciding with the 2009 General Motors bankruptcy filing, GM decided to end the search for a buyer for its commercial truck manufacturing; as a less visible part of its restructuring, the company decided to discontinue medium-duty truck operations. On July 31, 2009, the final GMT560 medium-duty truck rolled off the assembly line from Flint Truck Assembly on July 31, 2009; the facility was converted to increase production of GMT900 trucks.

=== Chevrolet Silverado HD (2019–present) ===
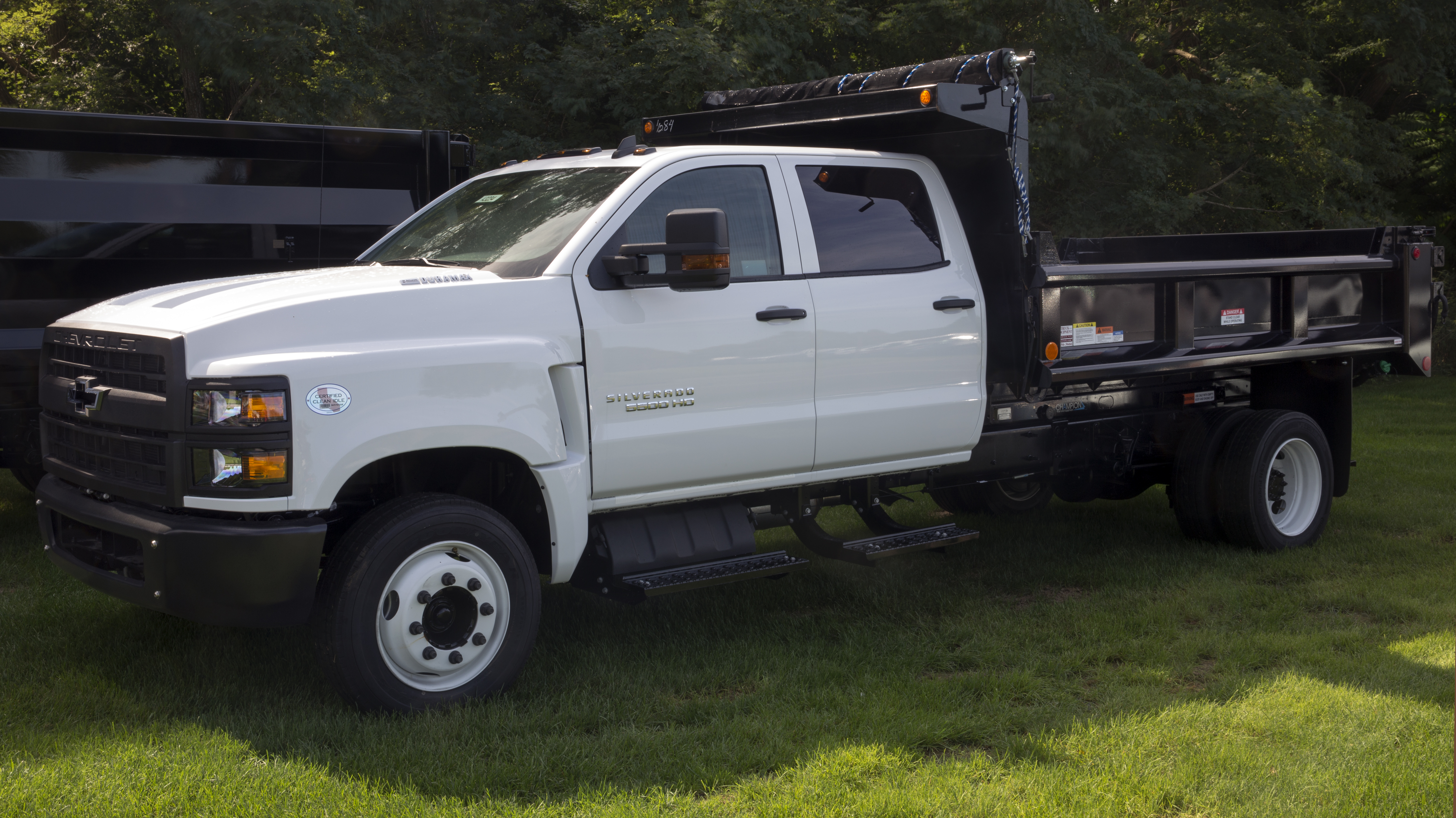
2019 Chevrolet Silverado 5500HD crew cab

For 2019, General Motors reentered the medium-duty segment (Class 4–6) after a decade-long hiatus. Developed in a joint venture with Navistar (today, International Motors), the Chevrolet Silverado 4500HD, 5500HD, and 6500HD is a vocationally-oriented medium-duty truck. The trucks are assembled by Navistar in its facility in Springfield, Ohio; the company also markets the line as the International CV (replacing the International TerraStar as its smallest truck).

In line with the first two generations of the Kodiak, the medium-duty Silverado/International CV adopts its cab from pickup trucks (featuring the K2XX-generation Silverado), mounted on a dedicated chassis with heavier-duty frame rails and a forward-tilting hood. As of current production, the model line is offered with a 350hp 6.6L Duramax turbodiesel V8; the engine is paired with a choice of Allison automatic transmissions, depending upon the truck's intended usage. Currently, both 4x2 and 4x4 configurations are offered.

In a break from GM tradition, the medium-duty Chevrolet Silverado HD is sold with no GMC divisional counterpart. Alongside its comarketing by International, General Motors has sought to remarket GMC during the 2020s. In contrast to its past of vehicles developed for vocational use, GMC competes as a premium brand, showcasing its luxury-oriented Denali trim. In contrast to International, the Silverado nameplate has been expanded to nearly the entire Chevrolet truck range in North America, excepting the Colorado mid-size pickup truck, Express full-size van, and Low Cab Forward COE (Chevrolet-branded Isuzu NPR).

== Variants ==
=== Four-wheel drive ===
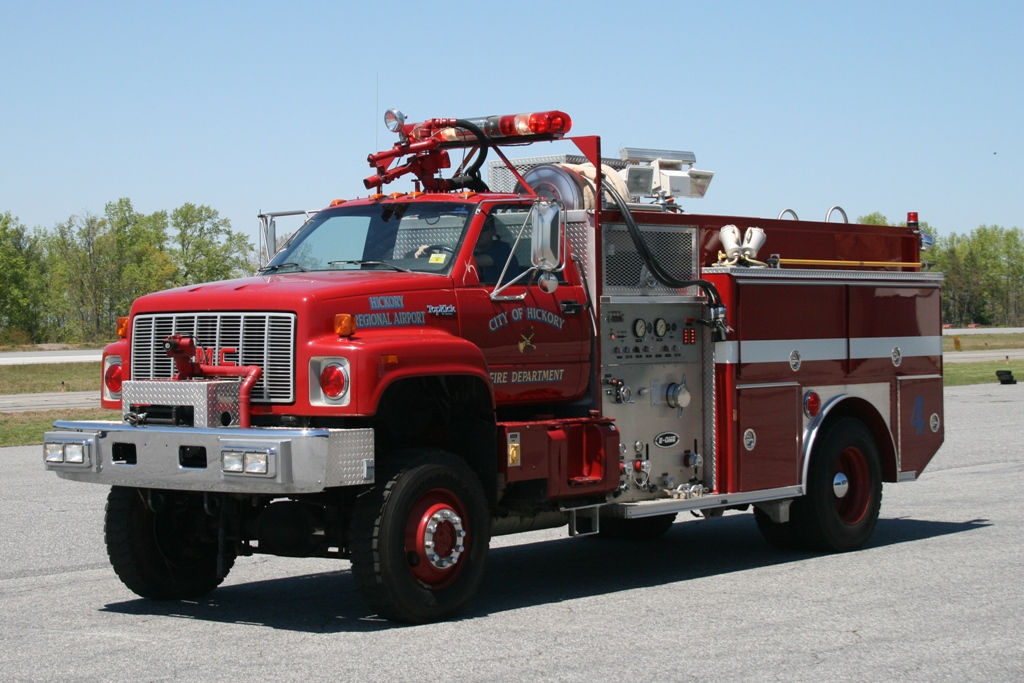
GMT530-generation GMC TopKick C7500 4x4 in use as ARFF truck

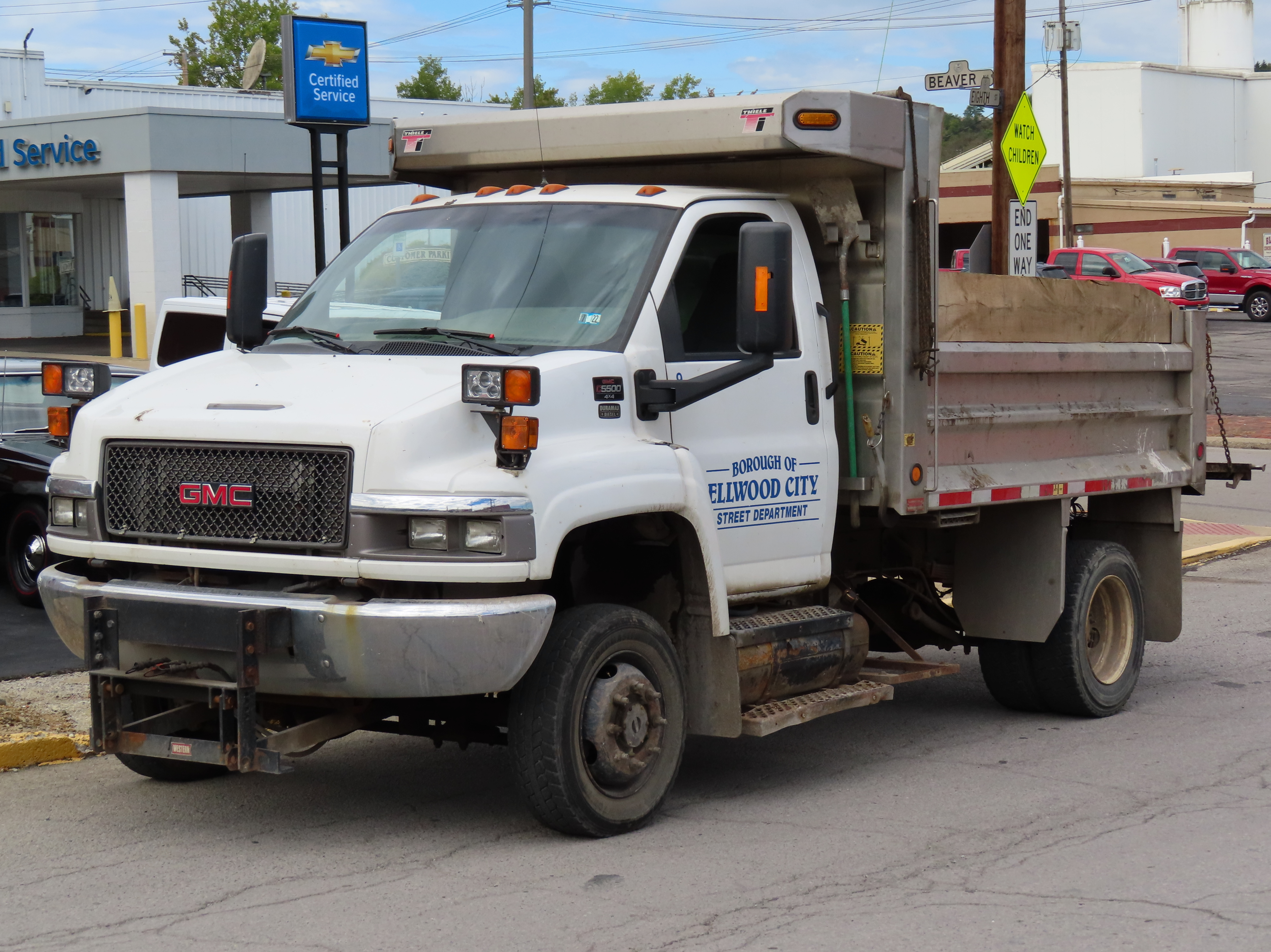
GMC TopKick C5500 4×4 with Deluxe Front Appearance Package

For 1998 production, General Motors approved 4x4 conversions of GMT530 trucks by upfitter Monroe Truck Equipment, licensing conversions of crew-cab C5500 and C6500 trucks (in addition to C3500HD trucks).

For the subsequent GMT560 architecture, four-wheel drive was added by General Motors as a factory-installed option on C4500/C5500 trucks. In a break from GM naming tradition, these vehicles did not adopt a "K" prefix, instead named as C4500/5500 4x4s. In place of the independent front suspension of GMT800 K3500 4x4s, GMT560 4x4s used a solid front axle suspension.

Powered by a 6.6L Duramax V8, the 4×4 used a 5-speed Allison 2000 series transmission in 2005–2006 (replaced by a 6-speed Allison 2350 automatic) with a New Process 273C transfer case; all GMT560 4×4s came with a 5.13:1 rear axle ratio. For 2007, a heavier-duty 9000-lb spring and brake option package was introduced for Dana 70HD front axle. The rear axle was available in four capacities: 11,000lb, 13,500lb, 15,000lb, and 19,000lb (the latter two were options on two-wheel-drive configurations).

=== School bus ===
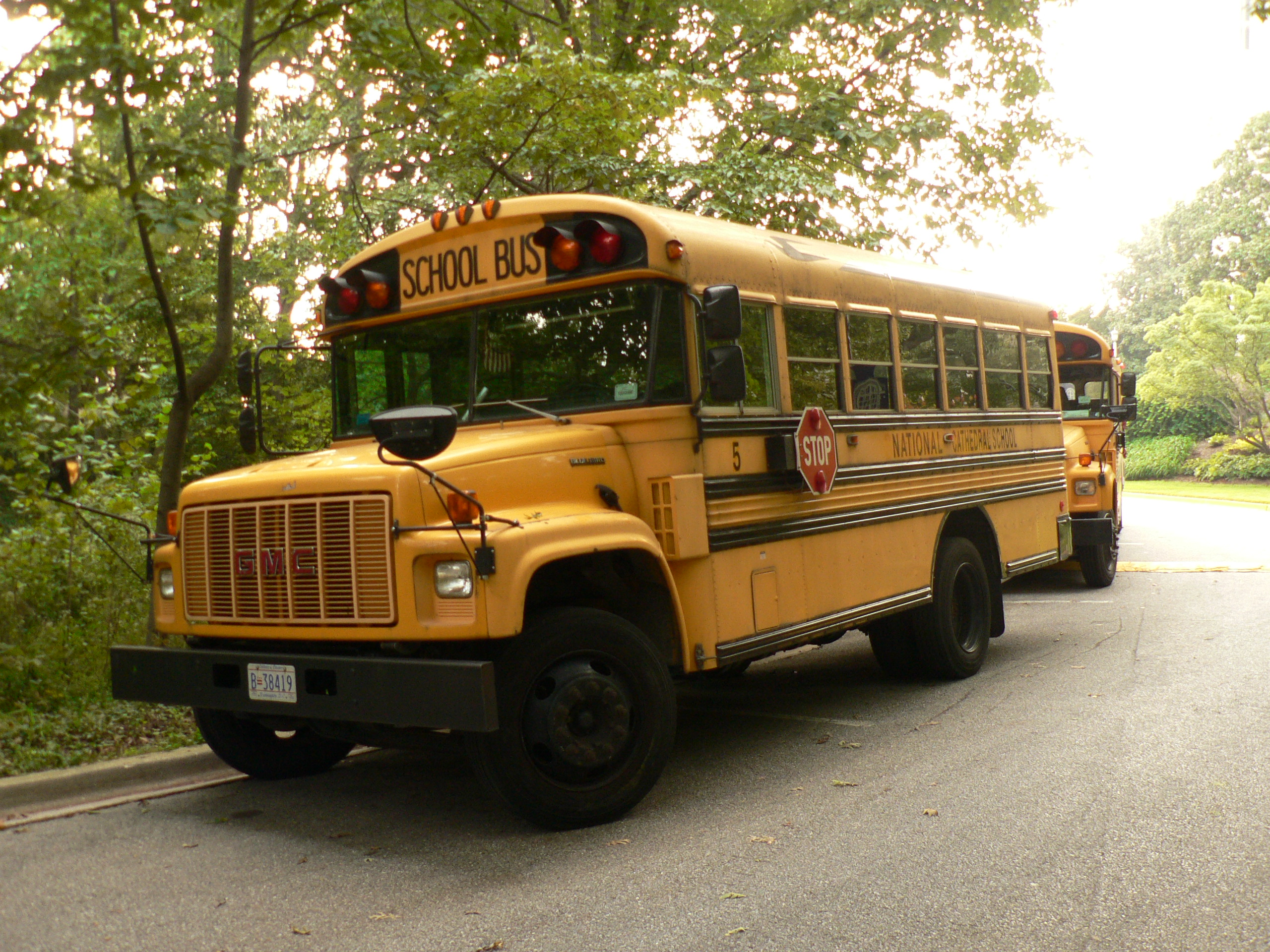
Blue Bird/GMC school bus

Following in the tradition of its medium-duty C/K predecessor, the GMT530 platform was utilized by General Motors to supply the school bus industry throughout its production run. In an unusual move at the time, starting in 1992, GM offered the Kodiak/TopKick solely to a single body manufacturer, Blue Bird Corporation, until 2002.

While the GMT530 chassis was not offered to other body manufacturers (as a cowled chassis), body manufacturer Blue Bird continued to offer other chassis combinations (Ford B700/B800/B8000, International 3800, and the later Freightliner FS-65). As the 1990s progressed, production agreements between body manufacturers and chassis suppliers began to restructure school bus production; after the GMT530 was retired in 2002, General Motors was left without a body manufacturer to supply chassis production.

Sharing most of its commonality with the C6500, the GMT530 Kodiak/TopKick bus chassis is notable for being one of the last school bus chassis powered by a gasoline engine until the introduction of the Ford 6.8 L Triton V10-powered Blue Bird Vision in 2016.

=== Pickup conversion ===
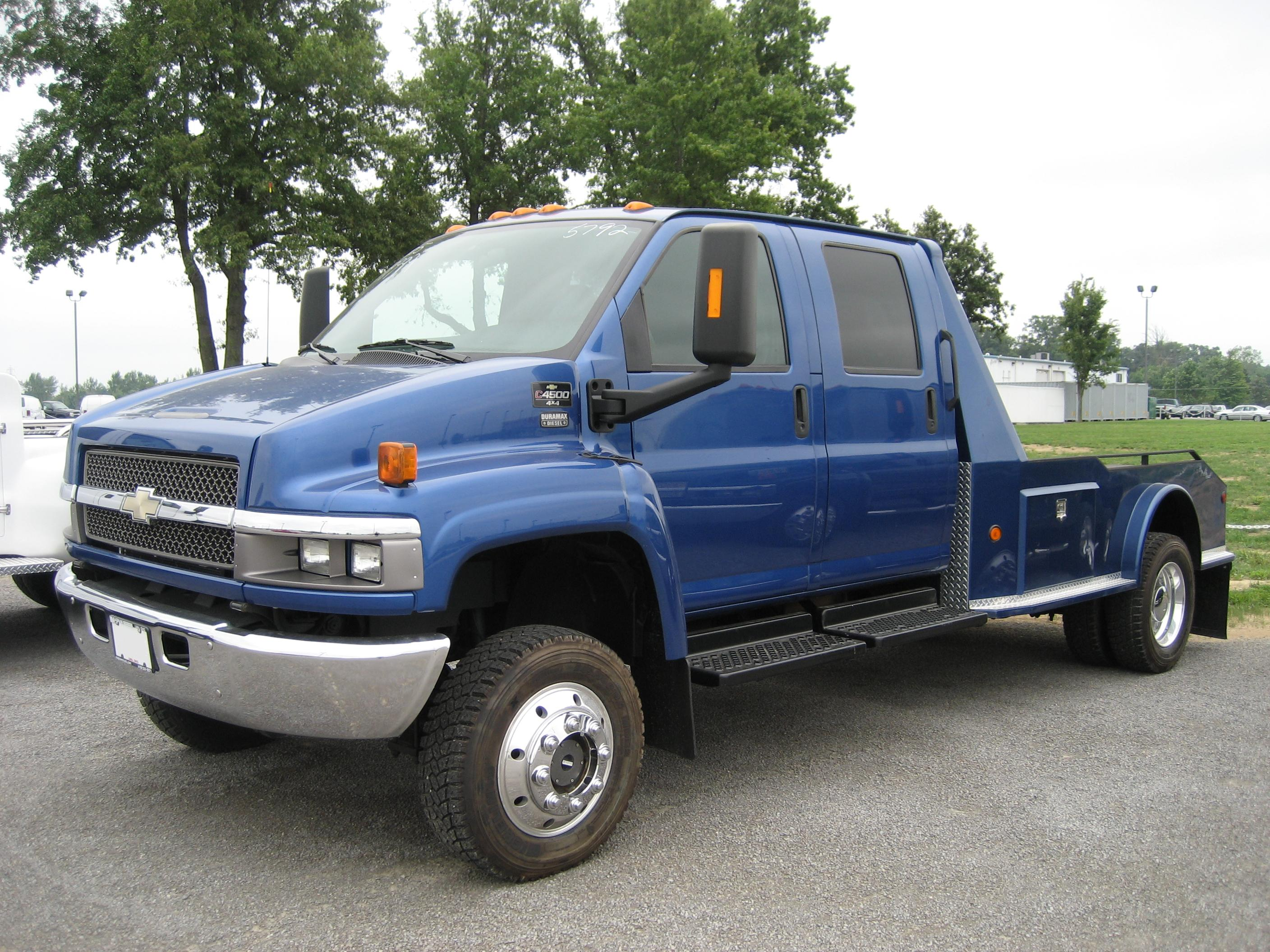
Chevrolet Kodiak C4500 with a fifth-wheel trailer-towing rear utility/pickup body

A special Kodiak C4500 was introduced at the 2006 Chicago Auto Show. Aimed at the International RXT (also introduced there), pricing was set at $70,000. The two shared a number of similarities, such as the options included in their premium packages (a powerful audio system and DVD-based navigation system). In comparison, the C4500 had higher power (300 hp versus 230 hp) while the RXT had a higher towing capacity at 22,500 lb (10,200 kg); the C4500 was a 4x4 like the larger International CXT.

A conversion of the commercial GMC TopKick called the Ultimate Class IV TopKick Pickup crew cab pickup truck was developed by General Motors and Monroe Truck Equipment (MTE). This special version featured an 8.5-foot (2.6 m) steel dually pickup box and tailgate with custom composite side panels and protective Rhino interior lining. This vehicle served as the alternate mode for the character Ironhide in the first three Transformers films.

=== Cadillac One ===
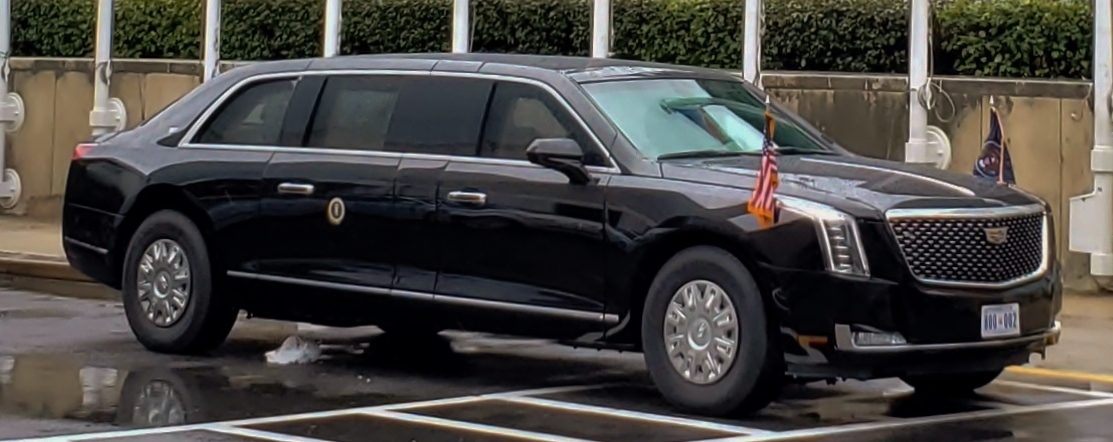
"Cadillac One", a one-of-a-kind Cadillac body mounted on the GMT560 chassis (2018 version)

Since 2009, the United States Presidential State Car has been labeled "Cadillac One" (in line with Air Force One and Marine One). As a result of its massive size, it is also nicknamed "The Beast". While such details are officially classified information, it is estimated to weigh between 15,000 and 20,000 pounds (6,800 and 9,100 kg). Corresponding to its operation by the Secret Service, many details about the vehicle have never been revealed by the government or by Cadillac. During its development, the 2009 version of "The Beast" was seen in testing alongside GMT560 GMC TopKicks.

In place of previous Presidential State Cars, the 2009 limousine shared no commonality with any production Cadillac sedan ever built, instead designed with a body specifically for its use as a state car. Externally, the limousine sourced various components from multiple Cadillac lines.

In 2018, the second generation of "Cadillac One" limousines entered service, again using the medium-duty GMT560 diesel truck chassis. Though functional changes will remain classified information, the body visibly differs from the 2009 vehicle, adopting contemporary Cadillac design elements. As with the 2009 vehicle, no commonality was directly shared with any specific Cadillac line.
