= GMC Brigadier =

Chevrolet Bruin/GMC Brigadier
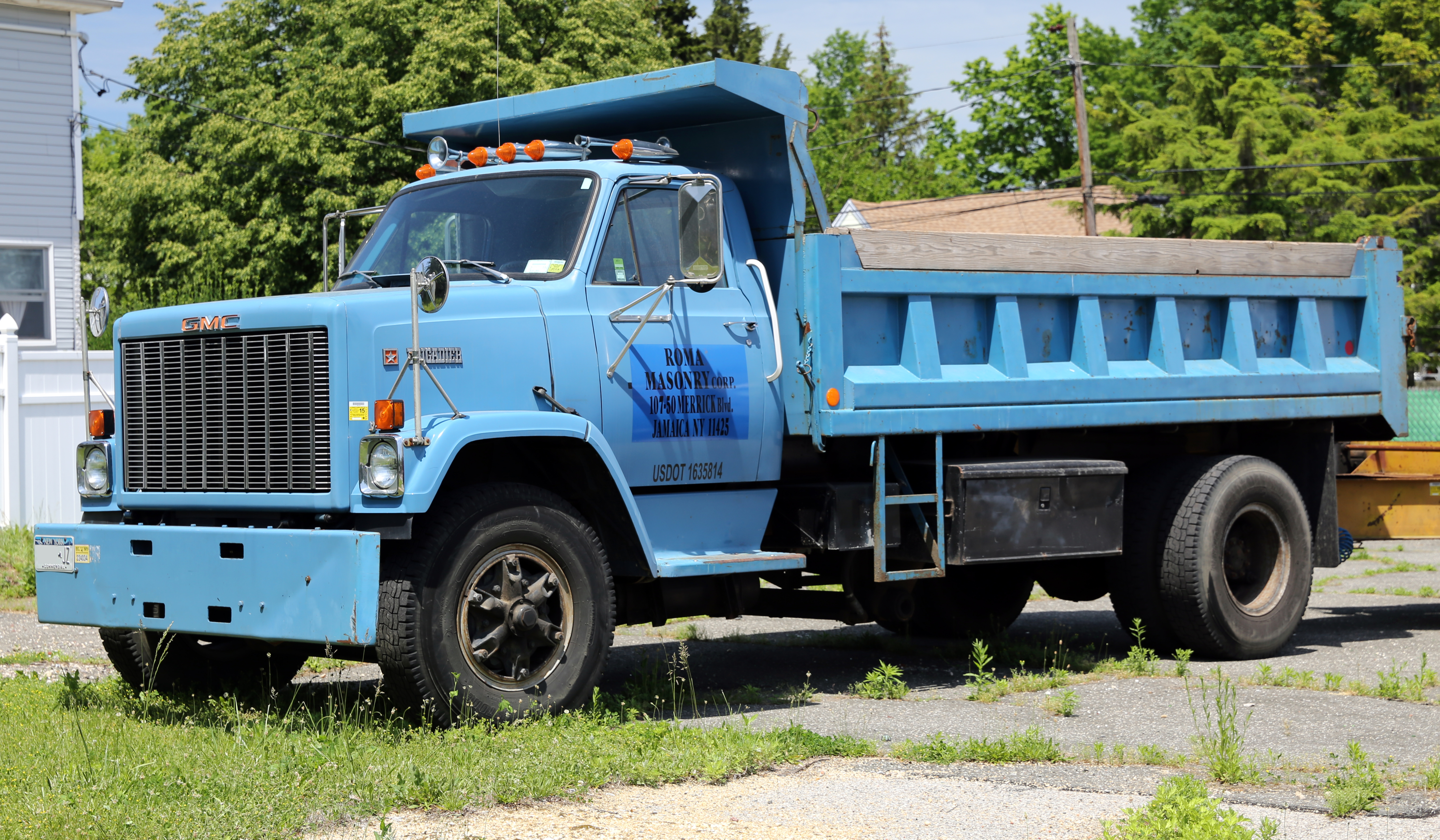
- 1986 GMC Brigadier 8000

Overview
- Manufacturer: GMC Truck and Coach Division
- Also called: Chevrolet Bruin; WhiteGMC Brigadier (1988-1989)
- Production: 1977-1988
- Model years: 1978-1989
- Assembly: United States: Pontiac, Michigan (Pontiac Central Assembly)

Body and chassis
- Class: Class 7-8 truck
- Chassis: Ladder frame

Dimensions
- Wheelbase: 139–218 in (3,531–5,537 mm)

Chronology
- Predecessor: Chevrolet/GMC H/J-series (1966-1977)
- Successor: Chevrolet Kodiak/GMC TopKick; WhiteGMC WG

The GMC Brigadier (also known as Chevrolet Bruin) is a series of heavy-duty (Class 7-8) trucks that were assembled by the GMC Truck and Coach Division of General Motors. The second generation of the H/J-series heavy-duty conventionals, the Brigadier was produced from 1978 to late 1989, as a WhiteGMC for the last year and a half. Slotted between the largest medium-duty C/K trucks and the GMC General, the Brigadier was a Class 7-8 short-hood conventional similar to the Ford L-Series and Mack Model R. Configured in both straight truck and semi-tractor layouts, the Brigadier saw use in short-haul, vocational, and severe-service applications.

All examples were assembled alongside medium-duty GM trucks and GM RTS buses at the GMC Truck & Coach Pontiac Central Assembly facility in Pontiac, Michigan. From 1978 to 1980, Chevrolet marketed the Brigadier as the nearly identical Chevrolet Bruin. Following the launch of Volvo GM Heavy Truck Corporation, the Brigadier was marketed under the combined WhiteGMC branding through the 1989 model year.

== Background ==
In 1966, General Motors split its heavy-duty trucks further apart from medium-duty models, giving them a distinct chassis and ending the use of the cab from the C/K-series pickup truck. The 1966 H/J-series (Note: These "Short Conventional Cab" heavy-duty trucks shared a 93-inch BBC cab and are distinguished by their rear axle setup; H-series trucks have a single rear axle, while J-series trucks have a tandem rear axle.) was designed with a model-specific 93 in (2,400 mm) bumper to back of cab (BBC) dimension cab and chassis; the medium-duty models received a slightly longer 96 in (2,400 mm) BBC cab. Alongside GMC V6 and Chevrolet 427 V8 gasoline engines, the H/J trucks were available with Cummins, Detroit Diesel, and Caterpillar diesel engines.

The H/J-Series formed the basis of the C(later N)/M-series trucks, (Note: Similarly, these "Long Conventional" heavy-duty trucks with the 114/115-inch BBC cab are distinguished by their rear axle setup; C-series (later N-series) trucks have a single rear axle, while M-series trucks have a tandem rear axle.) which offered a longer 114–115 in (2,900–2,900 mm) BBC cab; the extra length was in front of the firewall to accommodate larger diesel engines. In 1977, the N/M-series was replaced by the Class 8 Chevrolet Bison/GMC General semitractor. From 1966 to 1970, GMC would use a separate conventional school bus chassis from Chevrolet, basing it on the H6500 instead of the medium-duty Chevrolet C60 (in 1971, GMC would return to a medium-duty chassis).

== Design overview ==
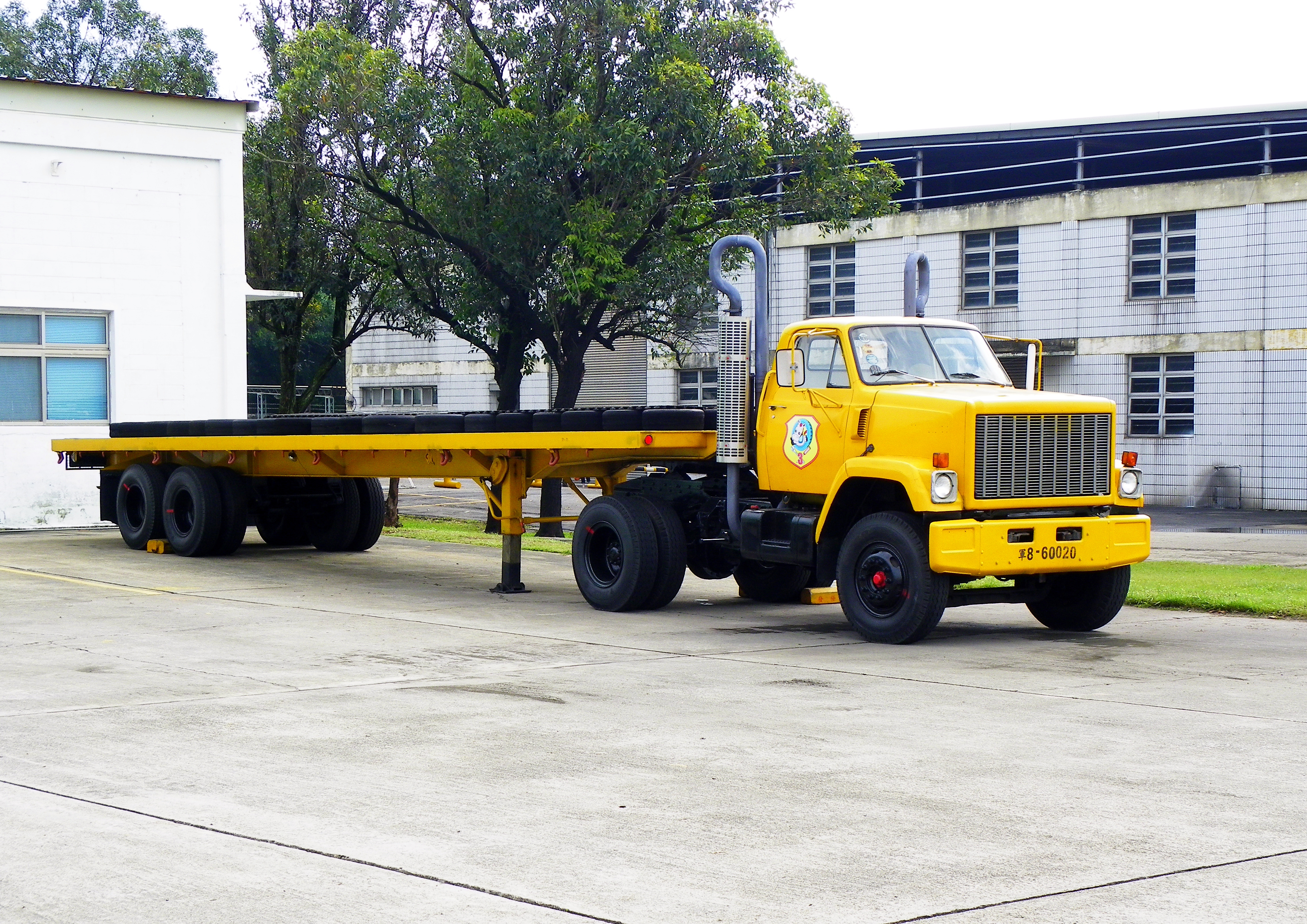
GMC Brigadier semitractor

In the mid-1970s, General Motors began shifting away from its alphanumeric nomenclature for truck names. While still using the H/J name internally, the redesign brought new names to the vehicles. Chevrolet rebranded the H/J series as the Chevrolet Bruin, adopting a range of "frontier" nameplates for its truck range (Bison, Bruin, Kodiak, Blazer, Silverado, Scottsdale, Cheyenne). For its heavy trucks, GMC adopted a military-related nomenclature, with the H/J series becoming the Brigadier, joining the General and TopKick (a slang term).

GMC introduced the Brigadier in a 9500 series; an 8000 series was introduced for 1979. Chevrolet offered the Bruin in 70, 80, and 90-series. While tilting-hood examples are nearly identical between brands, butterfly-hood versions are distinguished by their headlight configurations (Bruins have two headlights; Brigadiers have four).

=== Chassis/body ===
The Chevrolet Bruin and GMC Brigadier carried over the H/J 9500 cab introduced in 1966, but with a number of changes. Replacing the removable steel hood is a fully tilting fiberglass hood with a larger rectangular grille; the larger hood features a redesigned radiator, featuring better engine cooling. For durability, the previous-generation center-hinged "butterfly" hood remains available. While produced with an optional cab airfoil, the cab is sold with either a one-piece or a two-piece windshield.

The Chevrolet 427 gasoline V8 would be the standard engine for the Bruin/Brigadier. In 1982, the Brigadier became powered exclusively by diesel engines. Alongside the Detroit Diesel 6V53, 6V71, 6-71, 8V71, and 6V92, the Caterpillar 3208 were used alongside the Cummins NTC diesels. In 1984, the Cummins L10 was introduced as an option.

== Discontinuation ==
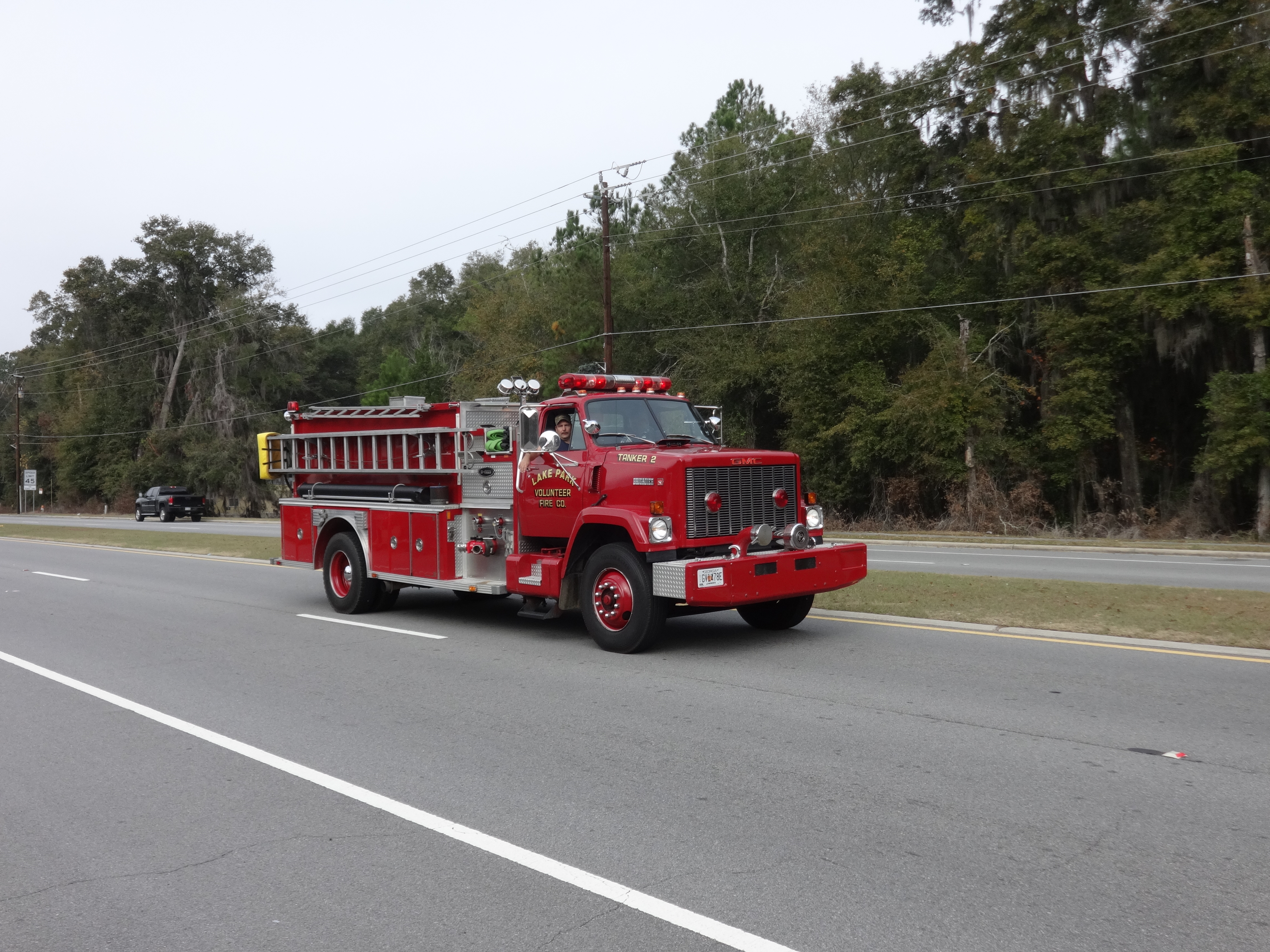
1980s GMC Brigadier in use as fire engine

Following the launch of the product line, the GMC Brigadier quickly overtook the Chevrolet Bruin in sales and market share. After the 1980 model year, General Motors ended sales of heavy trucks by the Chevrolet Division, leading to the cancellation of the Chevrolet Bruin, Bison, and Titan. A major factor leading to the cancellation was lack of product support by Chevrolet dealers.

In contrast to Chevrolet (and other General Motors brands), GMC required all franchisees to sell and service the GMC product line in its entirety. In addition to light trucks, this meant a potential GMC franchise needed the ability to support medium-duty trucks, heavy-duty commercial trucks, P-chassis, the GMC Motorhome, and all bus chassis. For a GMC dealership, this requirement meant dedicating profitable space that would have otherwise gone to selling passenger cars.

In 1986, Volvo AB entered into a joint venture with General Motors in heavy-truck production, with Volvo holding an 85% stake. To reflect the 1980 acquisition of White Motor Company by Volvo, the products of Volvo GM Heavy Truck Corporation were marketed under the combined WhiteGMC product nomenclature. While the slow-selling GMC General and Astro were discontinued, Volvo GM initially continued production of the Brigadier.

In mid-1988, Volvo GM re-released the Brigadier as a WhiteGMC (the only GMC truck produced under the joint venture). Along with revisions to the badging, a sloped hood became an option (sharing its grille with the GMC TopKick). The WhiteGMC Brigadier was produced through the end of the 1989 model year, marking the retirement of the GM H/J chassis after 23 years. For WhiteGMC, the role of the short-hood Class 8 conventional was adopted by the WG series, slotted below the WIL/WCL (replacing the GMC General); all WhiteGMC conventionals were evolutions of the White Road Boss series.

For 1990, General Motors redesigned its medium-duty C/K trucks for the first time since 1973, adopting the Chevrolet Kodiak and GMC TopKick branding for the model lines. In 1997, the 8500-series TopKick was introduced, marking the first Class 8 truck produced by GM since 1989.
