= GMC Astro =

GMC Astro 95 Chevrolet Titan 90
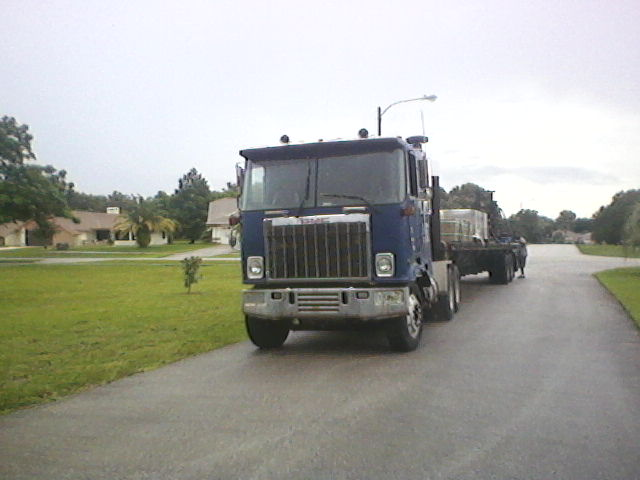
- 1980–1987 GMC Astro

Overview
- Type: Truck
- Manufacturer: GMC Truck and Coach Division (General Motors)
- Model years: 1969–1987 (GMC Astro); 1970–1980 (Chevrolet Titan)
- Assembly: United States: Pontiac, Michigan (Pontiac Central Assembly)

Body and chassis
- Class: Class 8 truck
- Layout: FR layout, 4×2 (F9500), 6×4 (D9500)
- Platform: GMC F/D 9500

Powertrain
- Engine: Diesel: Caterpillar 3406; Cummins N Cummins K Detroit Diesel 6-71; Detroit Diesel 8V71; Detroit Diesel 12V71; Detroit Diesel 6V92; Detroit Diesel 8V92

Chronology
- Predecessor: GMC F/D "Crackerbox"
- Successor: White GMC WHS/WHL (unofficial)

The GMC Astro (also known as the Chevrolet Titan) is a heavy-duty (Class 8) cabover truck that was manufactured by the GMC Truck and Coach Division of General Motors from the 1969 to 1987 model years. Succeeding the F/D-series "Crackerbox" cabovers, the Astro was marketed by Chevrolet as the Titan, and was the largest cabover truck ever produced by General Motors.

Following the 1980 model year, Chevrolet exited the heavy-truck segment; thereafter, alongside the Brigadier and General conventionals, the Astro was marketed solely under the GMC brand. In 1986, General Motors created the Volvo–GM joint venture with Volvo Trucks, leading to the discontinuation of the Astro in 1987. As of current production, GM has not marketed another Class 8 cabover truck (as the configuration has effectively ended production in North America).

Throughout the entire production run, the trucks were assembled in Pontiac, Michigan by the Pontiac Central Assembly facility.

== Background ==
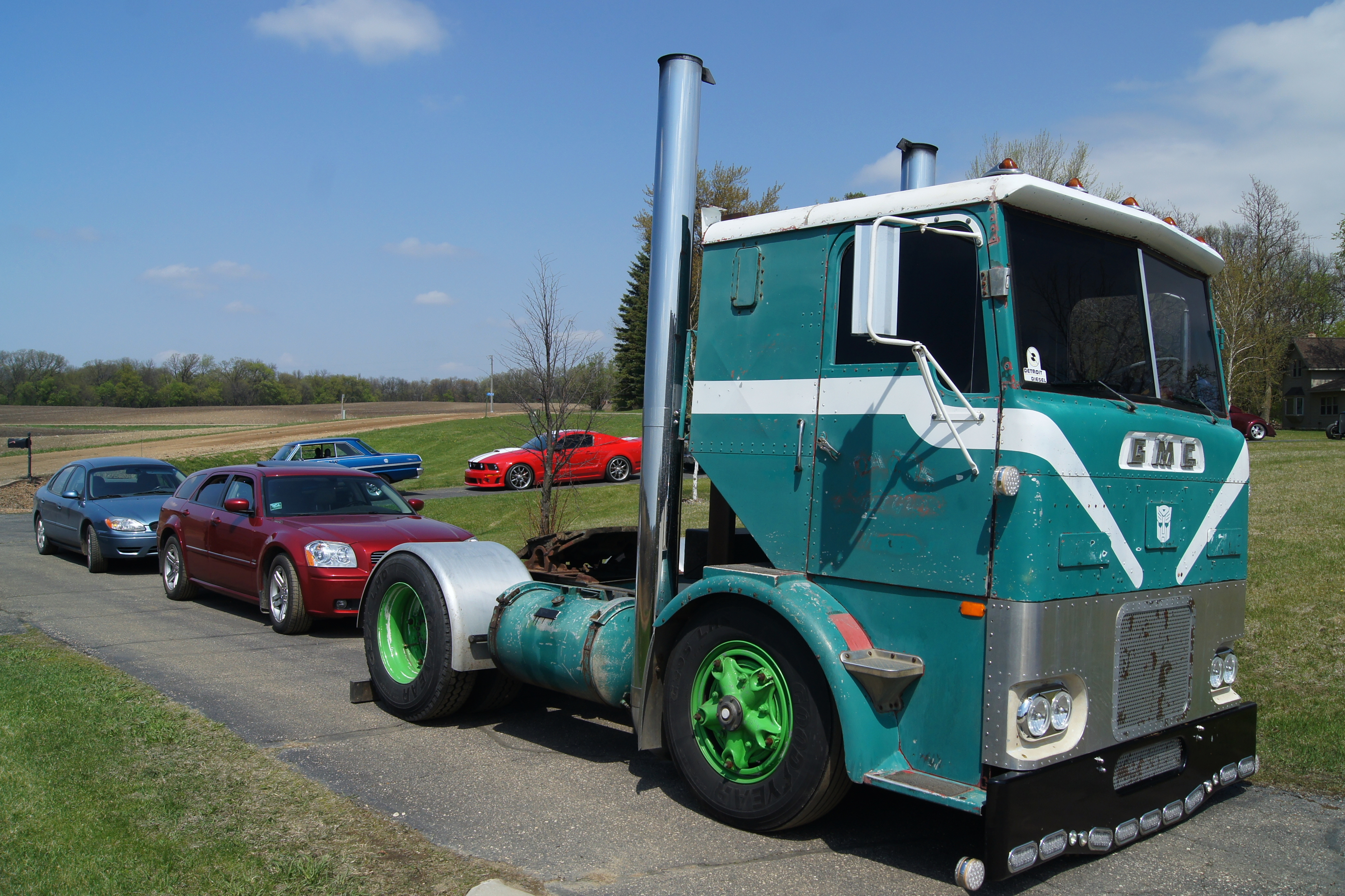
1959 GMC "Crackerbox" (with sleeper cab)

In 1959, GMC introduced its Class 8 cabover trucks, replacing the previous "Cannonball" fixed-cab cabovers. Distinguished by its boxy appearance, it earned the nickname "Crackerbox." Available in a 48-inch BBC (bumper to back of cab) length, the truck was produced with an all-aluminum fully tilting cab. Alongside a 702-cubic-inch GMC V12 gasoline engine, the truck was available with the Detroit Diesel 6-71, 6V71, 8V71, and 12V71 engines. Along with single-axle or tandem-axle configurations, the GMC Crackerbox was available with a sleeper cab.

In the late 1960s, as American truck manufacturers introduced updated designs for cabover trucks, design work began on an all-new Class 8 cabover. Expanding the product line to the Chevrolet brand, the replacement for the GMC Crackerbox sought to expand interior space, visibility, and driver ergonomics. For the 1969 model year, the GMC Crackerbox was replaced by the GMC Astro, while the Chevrolet Titan was unveiled for the 1970 model year.

== Design overview ==
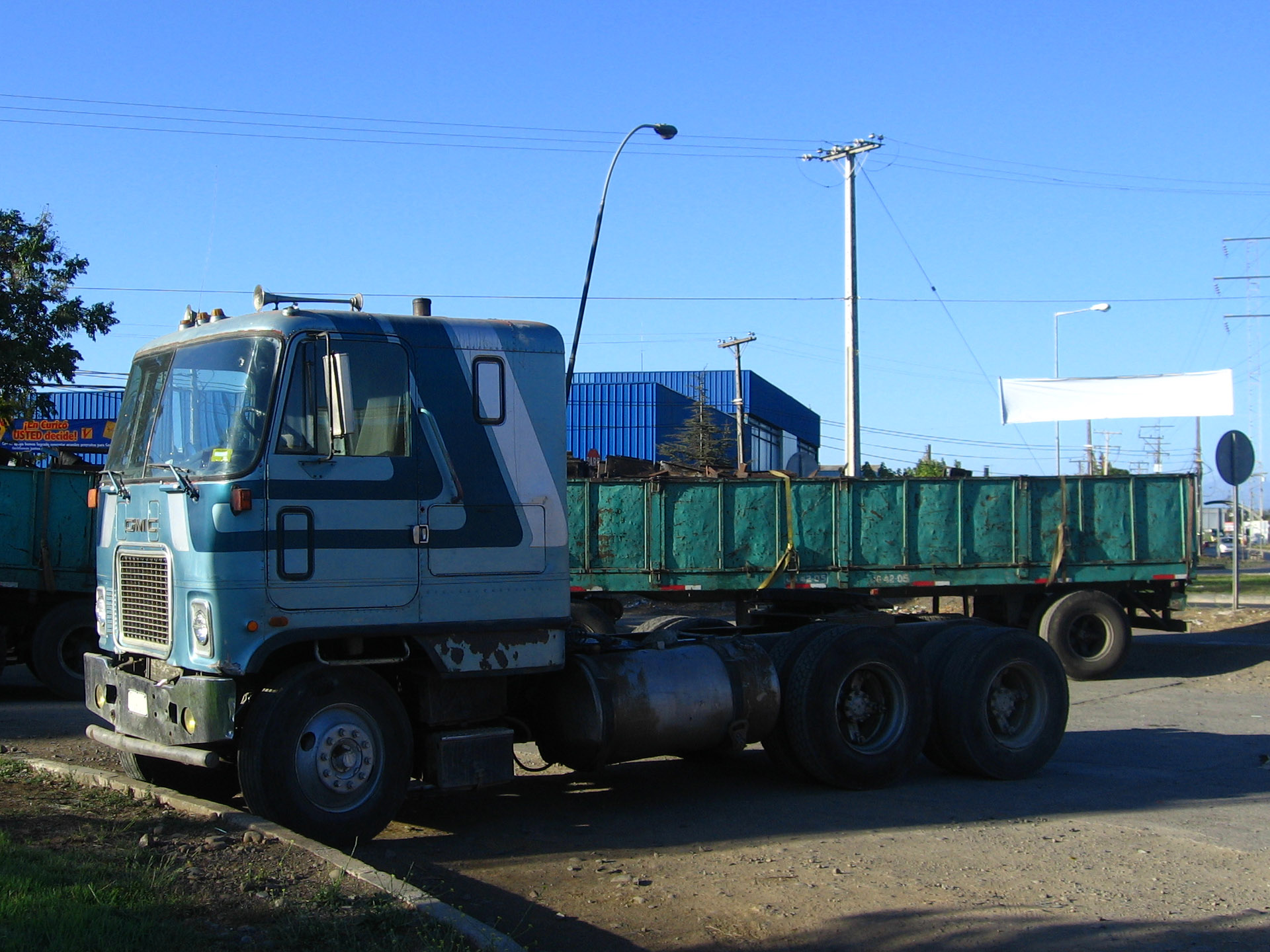
1985 GMC Astro in Chile, showing the smaller grille of 1969–1979 U.S. models.

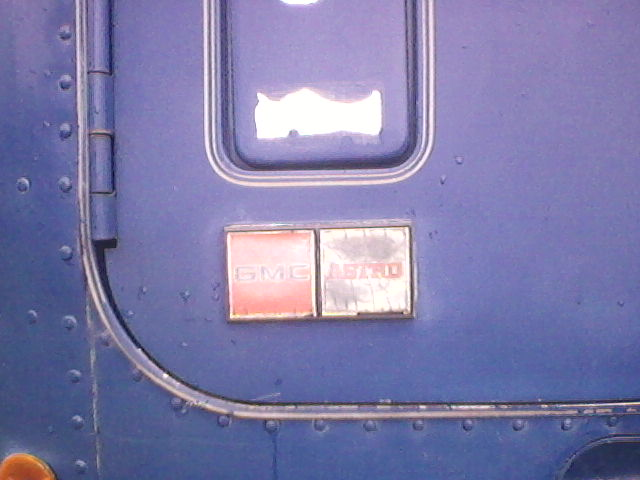
GMC Astro door emblem

The GMC Astro and Chevrolet Titan are Class 8 cabover-engine (COE) trucks, sold in both single and tandem rear axle configurations. In contrast to the Crackerbox, the cab of the Astro was lengthened nearly six inches into a 54-inch BBC length with two sleeper cab configurations available.

In what would be a distinguishing feature of the vehicle, the Astro/Titan was produced with a wraparound dashboard; the speedometer and tachometer were placed directly in the line of sight of the driver while most secondary gauges were placed off to the side, based on their level of use.

=== Aerodynamic enhancements ===
In stark contrast to the boxy Crackerbox, the exterior of the Astro/Titan featured rounded body corners and wraparound windshield glass. In 1975, GMC introduced a Dragfoiler roof spoiler as an option. In an option that became standard a year later, in 1979, GMC and Chevrolet offered the SS (Special Series) package. Featuring a (much) larger radiator grille, improvements to exterior and interior trim, the SS package was meant to market the Astro/Titan towards owner-operators. In 1983, the Aero Astro option package was released, largely as an effort to improve fuel economy. Along with the Dragfoiler roof spoiler, the option package included body extension panels between the cab and trailer, an air dam below an extended bumper and an optimized radiator grille.

=== Powertrain details ===
In a major change from precedent, when introduced in 1969, the Astro/Titan were marketed exclusively with diesel engines. The base engine was the Detroit Diesel 6-71N, with the Detroit 8V71 and Cummins N-Series diesel engines as options. In 1972, the Detroit 12V71 became available as an option; though rarely ordered, the V12 engine would remain through 1978. Although Detroit Diesel had developed a gas-turbine version of the GMC Astro in the early 1970s, fuel-economy concerns would keep it out of production. In 1977, the Cummins KT450 and Caterpillar 3406 became options; the larger engines required the addition of a larger radiator. In 1979, the 6-71 was replaced by the 6V92, making all available Detroit Diesel engines V-type engines; the 6V71 was discontinued after 1980.

== Discontinuation ==
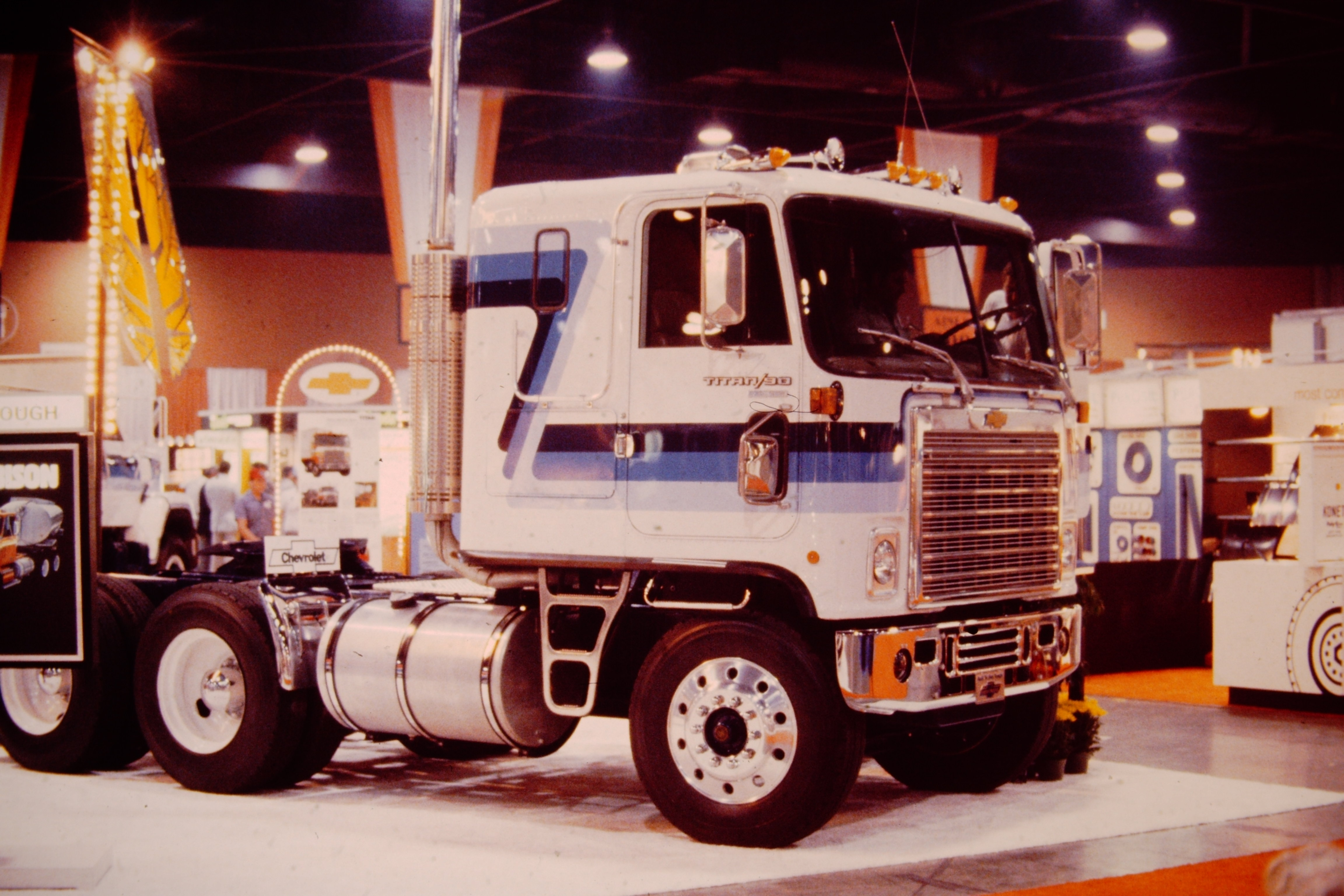
1980 Chevrolet Titan 90 on display in the 1979 truck show at World Congress Center in Atlanta, Georgia.

Following the launch of the cabover product line in 1969, the GMC Astro quickly exceeded the Chevrolet Titan in sales and market share.

=== Chevrolet division withdrawal ===
In 1981, General Motors ended sales of heavy trucks by the Chevrolet division, leading to the cancellation of the Chevrolet Bruin, Bison, and Titan. A major factor leading to the cancellation was lack of support for heavy-duty trucks by Chevrolet dealers. In contrast to other GM brands, a key requirement of GMC franchisees of the time was the ability to sell and service the entire GMC product line. In addition to light trucks, this meant a potential GMC franchise needed the ability to support medium-duty trucks, heavy-duty commercial trucks, the GMC motorhome, P-chassis, and school bus chassis. For a typical dealership, this meant dedicating profitable space that would have otherwise gone to selling passenger cars.

=== Volvo GM venture ===
In 1986, Volvo AB entered into a joint venture with General Motors in heavy-truck production, with Volvo taking an 85% stake. Having already acquired White Motor Company in 1980, the joint venture would do business as Volvo GM Heavy Truck Corporation, selling trucks under the combined WhiteGMC product badge. Under the joint venture, GMC trucks were phased out in favor of White-designed Volvo GM products. The GMC Astro ceased production after the 1987 model year (coincidentally, two years after Chevrolet launched a van with the same name).

Although Volvo GM would continue sales of COE trucks under the White GMC and Western Star brands (the WhiteGMC WH and Western Star Cabover; both versions of the White Road Commander II), the GMC Astro was never directly replaced by Volvo GM, Volvo, or General Motors.
