= Pontiac East Assembly =

GM manufacturing facility

Pontiac East
- Operated: 1972 – Sep 2009
- Location: 2100 South Opdyke Road; Pontiac, Michigan
- Coordinates: 42°37′02″N 83°15′34″W
- Industry: Automotive
- Products: Chevrolet and GMC trucks
- Owner: General Motors
- Defunct: September 2009; 16 years ago

Pontiac East Assembly (also known as Pontiac Assembly Center and GMC Truck & Coach Division Plant 6) was a General Motors manufacturing facility located in Pontiac, Michigan. The manufacturing complex at 2100 South Opdyke Road occupied a rectangular 162-acre site directly east of the GM Pontiac Centerpoint Complex. Hourly workers were represented by UAW Local 594.

The plant closed in 2009 and was demolished in 2011.

== History ==
The plant was built for the GMC Truck & Coach Division; ground was broken in 1970 and the plant was completed in 1972. Production of medium-duty conventional cab trucks was moved from Plant 2 to the newly completed plant in 1973. GMC Truck & Coach Division became GM Truck & Bus Group in 1981.

In 1985, medium-duty Chevrolet Kodiak/GMC Topkick truck production was consolidated with GMC General and GMC Astro heavy-duty truck production at Pontiac Central Assembly, and the plant was renovated and re-tooled to produce the all-new GMT400 light-duty pickups. Floor space amounting to 712,000 square feet (66,100 m^{2}) was added, including a second floor that housed the paint facility. Production of the GMT400 Chevrolet C/K and GMC Sierra began in December 1986.

In 1997 the plant was closed by an 84-day UAW strike, the longest strike against GM since 1972.

The plant closed in September 2009 and ownership was transferred to the RACER Trust, an organization marking surplus GM properties, as part of the General Motors bankruptcy settlement.

In late 2011, demolition of the plant began. According to the RACER Trust, the site where the plant stood has been sold. In early 2014 the buyer was identified as Challenge Manufacturing Co., of Walker, Michigan. Challenge plans to spend $50 million for a 400,000-square-foot plant on the site which will produce automotive components for General Motors. The new plant is expected to employ 450.

== Other Associated GMC Facilities ==
Plant 1, 3, 4, and 5 – known as Pontiac West Assembly.
Plant 2 at 660 South Boulevard E – known as "Pontiac Central Assembly".

== Vehicles produced ==
- Chevrolet Kodiak
- GMC TopKick
- Chevrolet C/K
- Chevrolet Silverado
- GMC Sierra
- GMT400
- GMT800
- GMT900
