= GMC General =

Chevrolet Bison GMC General
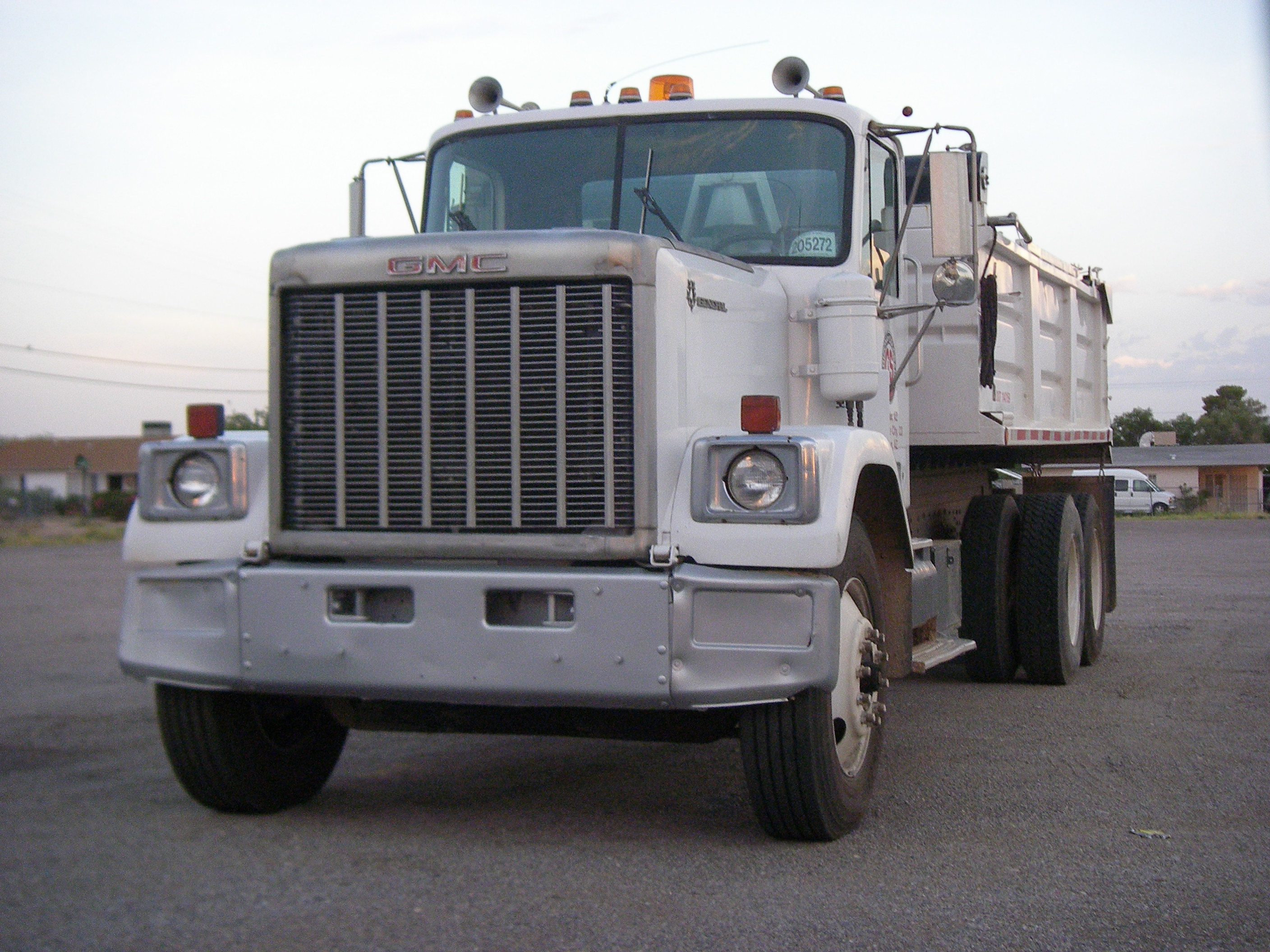
- GMC General in use as a dump truck

Overview
- Type: Truck
- Manufacturer: GMC Truck & Coach Division
- Model years: 1977–1987
- Assembly: United States: Pontiac, Michigan (Pontiac Central Assembly)

Body and chassis
- Class: Class 8 truck
- Layout: FR layout (4x2, 6x4)
- Chassis: Ladder frame

Powertrain
- Engine: Diesel (Caterpillar, Cummins, Detroit Diesel)

Chronology
- Predecessor: Chevrolet C/M 90; GMC C/M 9500
- Successor: White-GMC WIL/WCL (Volvo-GM)

The GMC General is a heavy-duty (Class 8) truck that was assembled by the GMC Truck and Coach Division of General Motors from 1977 to 1987. The largest conventional-cab truck ever produced by the company, the product line replaced the Chevrolet/GMC C/M 90/9500 trucks. From 1977 to 1980, the model line was also marketed as the Chevrolet Bison, prior to the brand ending its sales of heavy trucks.

In 1986, General Motors entered a joint venture with Volvo to produce heavy trucks, leading GMC to end production of the General conventional and Astro cabover in 1987.

The GMC General and Chevrolet Bison were assembled in Pontiac, Michigan at Pontiac Central Assembly (alongside the Chevrolet Bruin and GMC/WhiteGMC Brigadier). As of current production, the 1987 GMC General and Brigadier were the last heavy-duty trucks to be solely produced by General Motors.

== Background ==
In 1966, GMC Truck and Coach introduced its first dedicated heavy-duty trucks, moving away from trucks adapted from the smaller C/K line. The division introduced two lines using a common cab, the H/J-Series (93-inch BBC) and the C/M-Series (112-inch BBC). Using a longer hood, the C/M-series trucks were designed to accommodate larger diesel engines, such as the Cummins NH and Cummins V903, and the Detroit Diesel 8V71. The center-hinged "butterfly" hood of the H/J-series was replaced on the C/M by a front-hinged fiberglass hood. Following the introduction of the medium-duty C/K in 1973, the 112-inch BBC truck was consolidated to the M-Series.

During 1977 and 1978, GMC Truck and Coach further split its heavy-duty truck range. The Chevrolet M90/GMC M9500 were replaced by the Chevrolet Bison and GMC General in 1977, with the H/J range renamed the Chevrolet Bruin/GMC Brigadier in 1978.

== Design overview ==
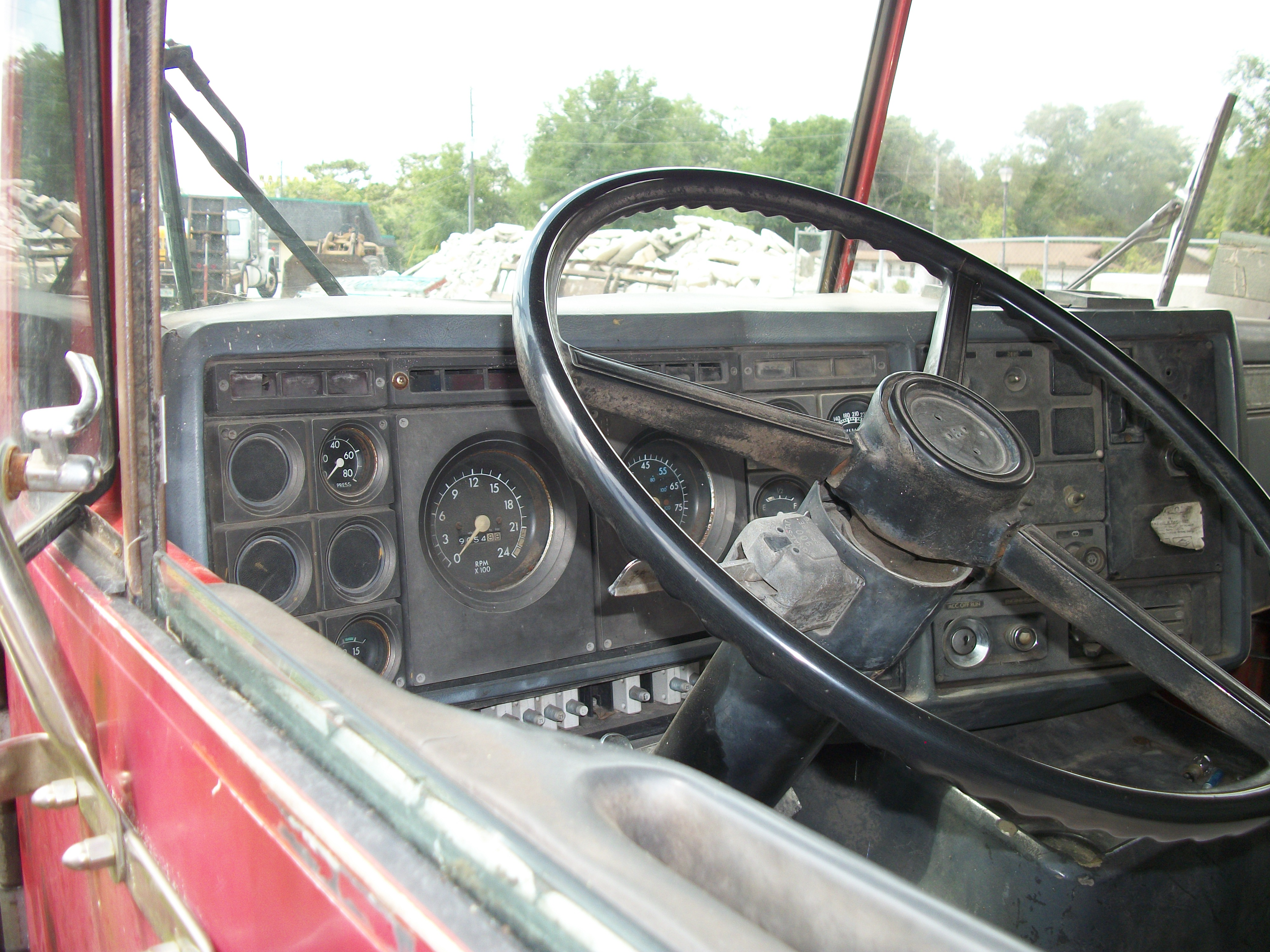
1984 GMC General dashboard

Similar in layout to the Ford LTL-9000, International Harvester Transtar 4300, and Mack Super-Liner, the Chevrolet Bison and GMC General are Class 8 conventional trucks. Produced with an all-aluminum cab built by Budd, the trucks were available in many different combinations. Two hood configurations were offered (108-inch or 116-inch BBC); along with a day cab, a 34-inch sleeper cab was offered, along with a walk-in sleeper cab (introduced in 1985).

While no gasoline engines were available, several diesel powerplants were available, with the Detroit Diesel 6-71 (later replaced by the 6V92) as the standard engine. Alongside the 6-71, a buyer could choose the Cummins N-series, or Detroit Diesel 8V71 and 8V92. Following its introduction in the GMC Astro, the Caterpillar 3406 was introduced in 1982.

When introduced in 1977, the Bison/General were available from dealers as vehicle gliders. Essentially a complete truck with the exception of the engine, transmission, and rear axles, the incomplete vehicles were designed for a dual purpose: to either reinstall an existing powertrain in a new truck or to allow for further customization not available from a dealership.

== Discontinuation ==
Following the launch of the product line, the GMC General quickly overtook the Chevrolet Bison in sales and market share. In 1981, General Motors ended sales of heavy trucks by the Chevrolet Division, leading to the cancellation of the Chevrolet Bruin, Bison, and Titan. A major factor leading to the cancellation was lack of product support by Chevrolet dealers. In contrast to other GM brands, a key requirement of GMC franchisees of the time was the ability to sell and service the entire GMC product line. In addition to light trucks, this meant a potential GMC franchise needed the ability to support medium-duty trucks, heavy-duty commercial trucks, the GMC motorhome, P-chassis, and school bus chassis. For a typical dealership, this meant dedicating profitable space that would have otherwise gone to selling passenger cars.

In 1986, Volvo AB entered into a joint venture with General Motors in heavy-truck production, with Volvo taking an 85% stake. Having acquired White Motor Company in 1980, the joint venture would do business as Volvo GM Heavy Truck Corporation, selling trucks under the combined WhiteGMC product badge. Under the joint venture, GMC trucks were phased out in favor of White-designed Volvo GM products. In 1987, the final GMC General was produced, followed by the Brigadier in 1988 (badged as a WhiteGMC); the withdrawal of the latter marked the exit of General Motors from the Class 8 truck segment.

Following the GMC General, Volvo GM focused on the WhiteGMC WC/WI Class 8 conventional. Originally introduced in 1980 as the White Road Boss 2, this model line was produced through 2000 in various forms with either White, WhiteGMC, Autocar, or Volvo badging.

[[Fan Fact]] The GMC General was used in all four seasons of Knight Rider (1982 TV series)
