= Janesville Assembly Plant =

Former automobile factory owned by General Motors

Coordinates: 42°39′47.93″N 89°1′14.02″W

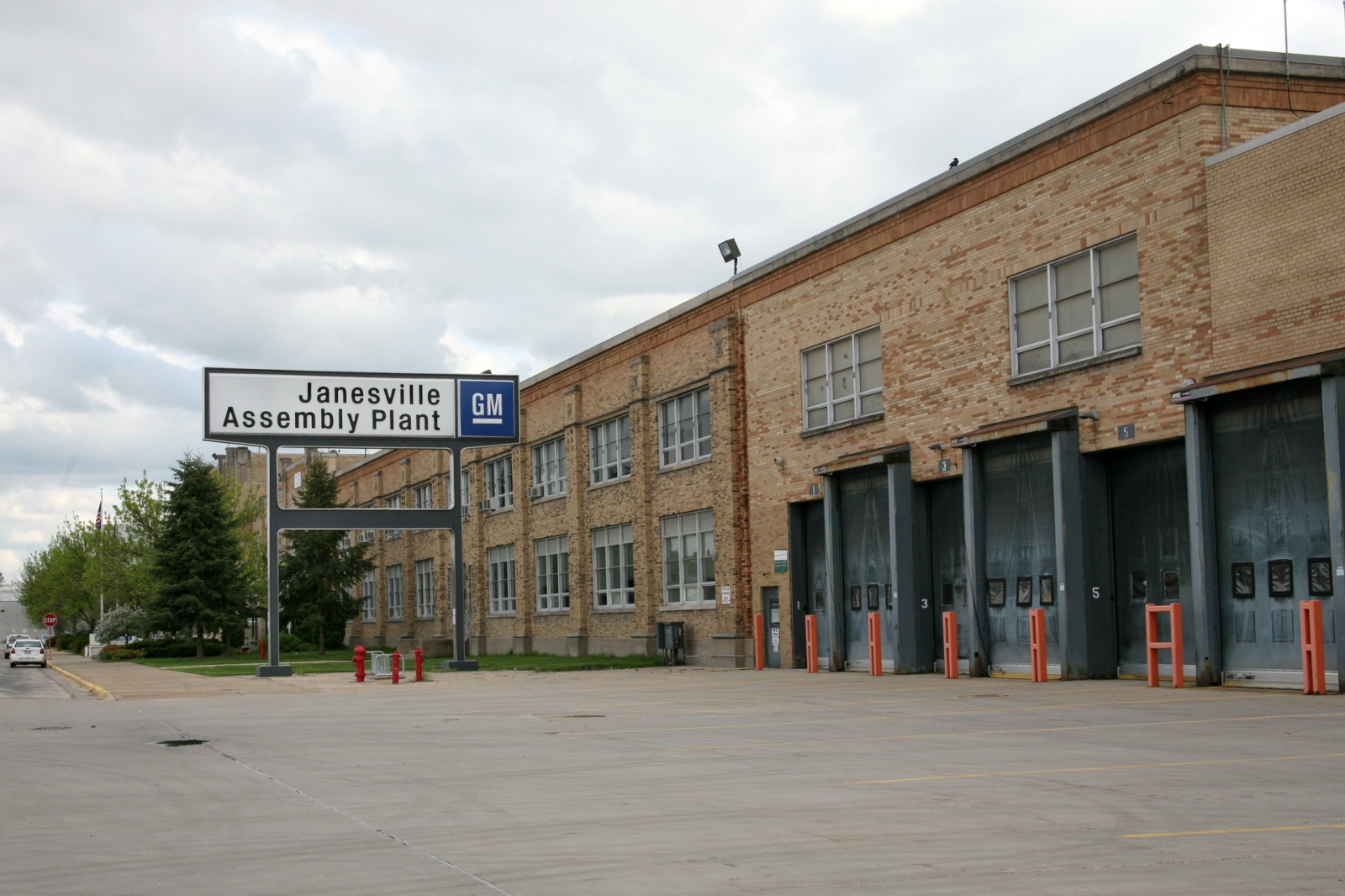
- Janesville Assembly Plant in 2009
- Built: May 1, 1919
- Location: Janesville, Wisconsin
- Industry: Automotive industry
- Products: cars and trucks
- Employees: 7,000 workers at its peak in 1970
- Area: 4,800,000 sq ft (450,000 m^{2})
- Owner: General Motors (1919 - 2017)
- Defunct: April 23, 2009

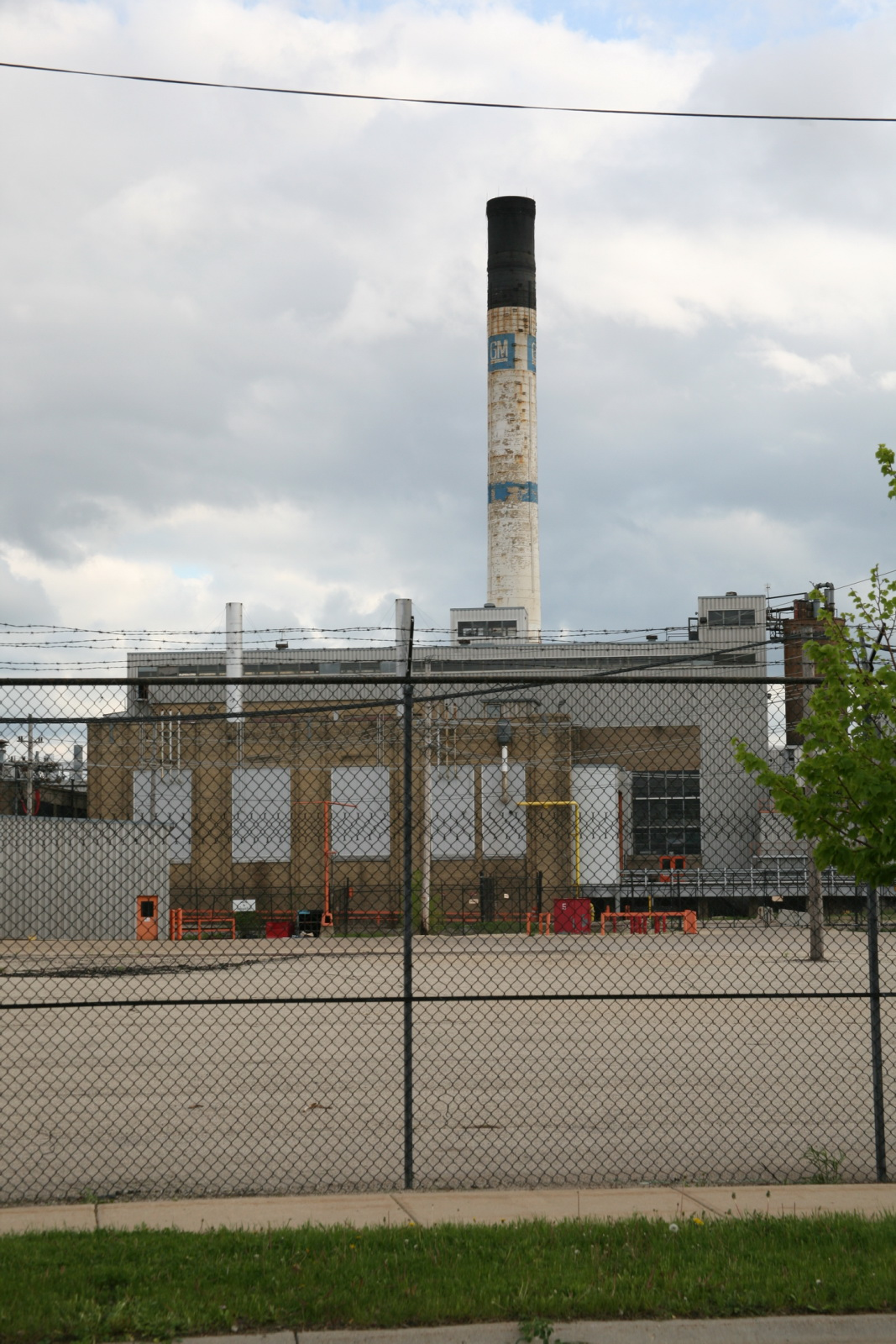
Janesville Assembly's chimney

Janesville Assembly Plant was a former automobile factory owned by General Motors located in Janesville, Wisconsin. Opened in 1919, it was the oldest operating GM plant when it was largely idled in December 2008, and ceased all remaining production on April 23, 2009. The demolition of the plant was completed in 2019.

The plant covered 4,800,000 sq ft (450,000 m^{2}). It employed around 7,000 workers at its peak in 1970, but was down to about 1,200 when it ceased production of GM vehicles in December 2008.

== Samson Tractor Division ==
In 1918, the Samson Tractor division of General Motors was formed from the merger of Samson Tractor of California and the Janesville Machine Company, a farm implement manufacturer. A Samson Tractor Division plant employing 3,000 workers was opened in Janesville in 1919, with the first tractor produced on May 1, 1919. A farm depression that started in 1920 forced Samson to curtail production and lay off more than 1,000 workers. Samson eventually went bankrupt. Although General Motors wanted to abandon the Janesville plant, its general manager, Joseph A. Craig, convinced the company to stay, and in 1920 GM transferred its truck production from Flint, Michigan, to the Janesville plant.

== Chevrolet plant ==
Chevrolet began producing automobiles at the plant in 1923. In the same year, an adjacent Fisher Body plant began construction. Production at the factory was halted during the Great Depression for about a year. In 1937 union organizers led a sit-down strike, part of a nationwide series of strikes at GM, which quickly resulted in a national contract. During World War II, the Janesville plants were taken over by General Motors' Oldsmobile Division, and produced artillery.

Production of automobiles resumed following the war. In 1953, a second shift was added to both the Chevrolet and the Fisher Body factories. In April 1967, the 100 millionth GM vehicle was produced at the Chevrolet plant.

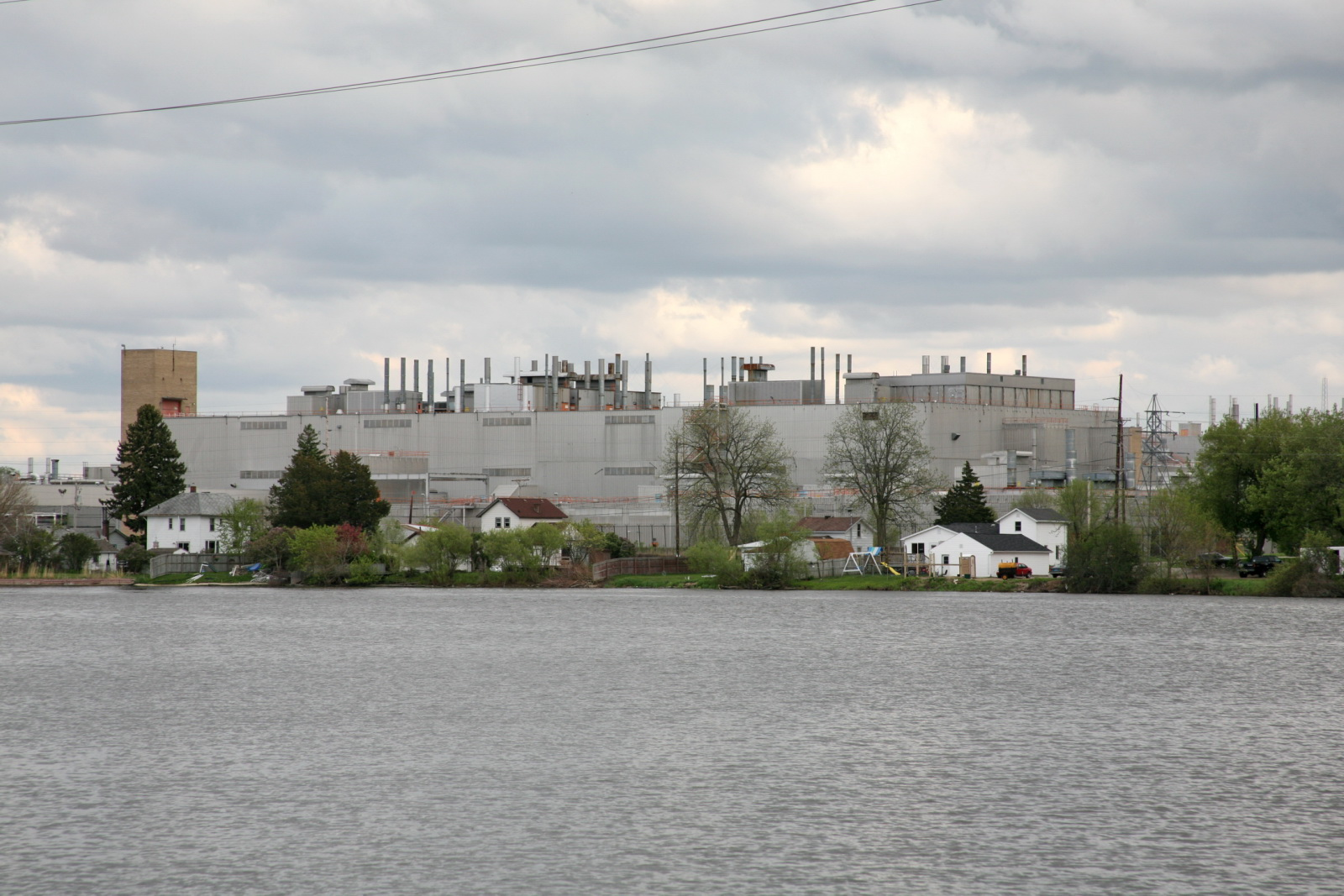
View of Janesville Assembly Plant from across Rock River

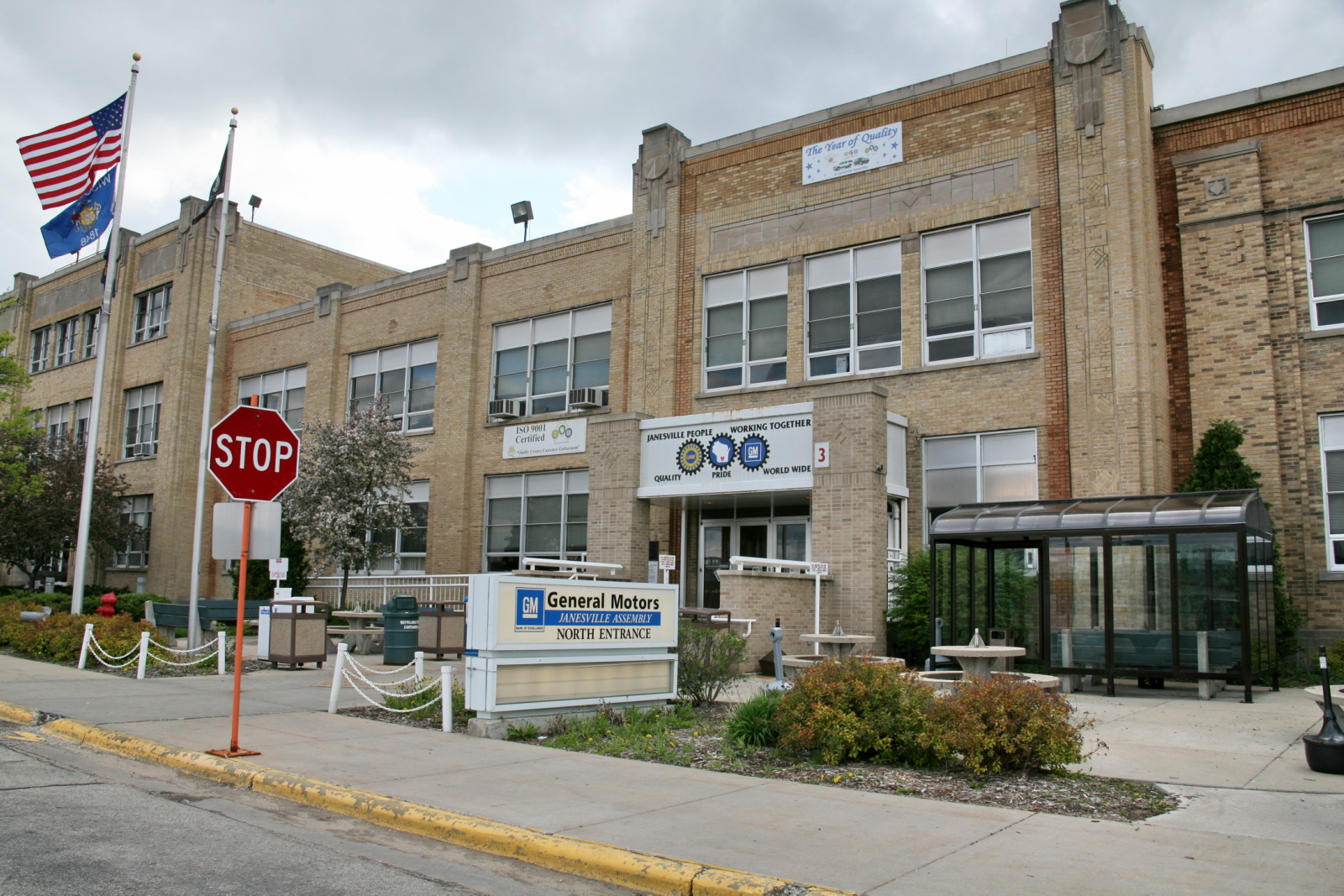
North entrance of Janesville Assembly Plant in 2009

In 1969, the Chevrolet and Fisher Body factories joined to form the General Motors Assembly Division. Peak production at the Janesville Assembly occurred in 1977, when there were 7,100 employees, and 274,286 cars and 114,681 trucks were produced.

In the 1980s General Motors moved large car production from Janesville and started making subcompact J-cars, such as the Chevrolet Cavalier. In 1987 the company moved Janesville's pickup line to the Fort Wayne, Indiana assembly plant. Local efforts resulted in GM moving medium-duty truck and full-size sport-utility production from plants in Michigan to Janesville. By 1992 it was the only GM plant manufacturing large SUVs. In 2002 GM returned Janesville's medium-duty truck production to Flint, Michigan.

Most recently the Janesville Assembly built full-size SUVs. It was one of three plants producing the GMT900 trucks, such as the Chevrolet Suburban. It began building the next-generation short-wheelbase GMT900 trucks in January 2006 and the long-wheelbase GMT900 trucks in March of that year and an overtime shift was added to meet demand. From 1994 until 2009, the plant also produced medium-duty trucks for Isuzu under its partnership with GM.

In 2006, the Janesville GM Assembly plant achieved a milestone of producing more than 500,000 full-size sport utility vehicles with E85 FlexFuel capable engines. The Janesville employees were recognized in a ceremony at the plant that included Wisconsin governor Jim Doyle (D).

In 2007, discussion of greenhouse gas fuel emissions regulations sparked a dialogue about the future of the Janesville GM plant. That same year United Auto Workers Local 95 participated in a strike at the facility.

== Decommissioning ==
In 2008, fuel prices, the related slow sales of SUVs, and the economy resulted in GM cutting back full-time production at the Janesville plant to a single shift. Combined with an ongoing employee buy-out program, layoffs totaled around 750 jobs in July 2008. During GM's annual shareholder meeting on June 3, 2008, CEO Rick Wagoner announced that the Janesville assembly plant would close by 2010, along with three other GM factories, and could close sooner if the market dictated. The cutbacks announced, along with other changes, were expected to save the North American division $1 billion per year starting in 2010. GM extended its annual summer shutdown an additional two weeks and planned another ten weeks of shutdown for the remainder of 2008 because of excess inventories of SUVs made at the plant.

External image
- "Last day at GM" Janesville Gazette photos from December 23, 2008

In October 2008, GM announced that the production of SUVs at the Janesville Assembly would end December 23, 2008. On that day workers gathered at a ceremony with a banner reading "Last Vehicle off the Janesville Assembly Line". The last GM vehicle produced, a black 2009 Chevrolet Tahoe, was donated to the United Way of North Rock County, which raffled the vehicle off.

57 production employees continued assembly work at the Janesville Assembly until April 23, 2009, completing the GM/Isuzu light truck partnership and then an additional 40 to 50 "skilled trade employees" worked to decommission the plant.

== 2015 and beyond ==
General Motors placed the factory on standby until at least 2015 when the company and employee unions negotiate a new contract. The factory was one of three — along with Orion Assembly and Spring Hill Manufacturing - that General Motors kept on standby during their bankruptcy. It was the only one still on standby status in 2014. The factory could only be completely closed by agreement of both General Motors and the United Automobile Workers.

By January 2016 GM had signed a new contract with the United Auto Workers that cleared the way for selling Janesville Assembly. Water or ground contamination on the north and south sides of the plant delayed the sale of the plant. GM worked with the Wisconsin Department of Natural Resources to clean up that area. In February 2016, GM was working with CBRE Group of Los Angeles to market the 250-acre site (excluding the contaminated area on the north side of the site) on a global market, hoping to have a buyer by 2017.

Demolition of the plant began in 2018 and was largely completed by early 2019.

== Former products ==
- Samson Tractor (1919–1923)
- Samson trucks (1920–1922)
- Artillery (World War II)
- Buick Skyhawk
- Cadillac Cimarron
- Chevrolet 150
- Chevrolet 210
- Chevrolet Bel Air
- Chevrolet Biscayne
- Chevrolet K5 Blazer (2 Door Full Size)
- Chevrolet C/K
- Chevrolet Caprice
- Chevrolet Cavalier
- Chevrolet Delray
- Chevrolet El Camino
- Chevrolet Impala
- Chevrolet Kodiak
- Chevrolet R/V
- Chevrolet Suburban
- Chevrolet T-Series
- Chevrolet Tahoe
- Chevrolet Task Force
- Chevrolet Tiltmaster
- GMC C/K
- GMC Forward
- GMC R/V
- GMC Suburban
- GMC T-Series
- GMC Topkick
- GMC Yukon
- GMC Yukon XL
- Isuzu F-Series
- Isuzu H-Series
- Chevrolet Full Size Station Wagons
- Chevrolet Light Duty Full Size Trucks

== See also ==
- List of GM factories
