= Chevrolet C/K (third generation) =

American truck series

Third generation
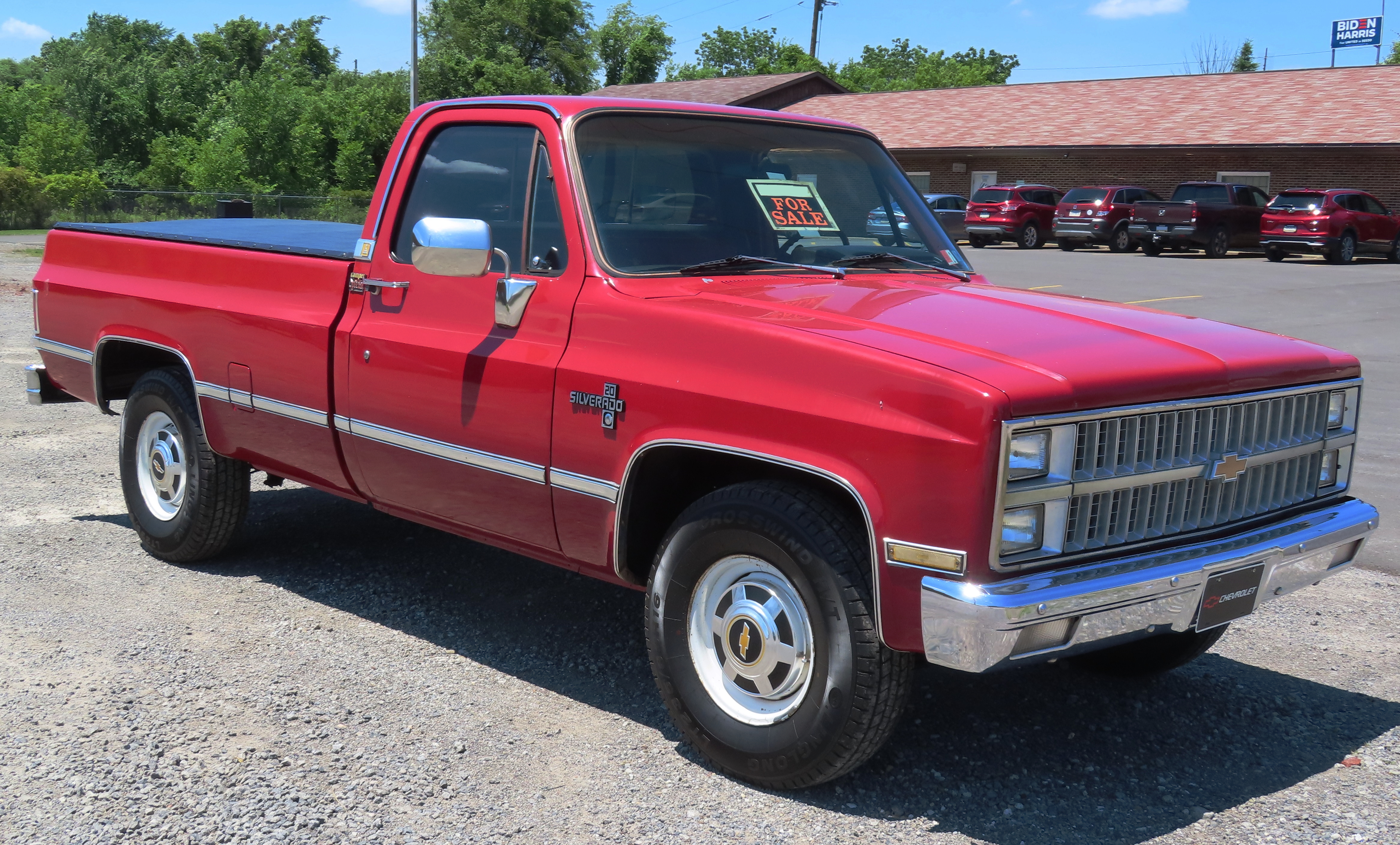
- 1982 Chevrolet C20 Silverado Camper Special

Overview
- Manufacturer: General Motors
- Also called: Chevrolet/GMC R/V series (1987–1991); Chevrolet/GMC Full-Size Pickup
- Production: 1972–1991 (United States, Canada, Mexico, Venezuela); 1974–1978 (Argentina, by Chevrolet); 1985–1991 (Argentina, by Sevel); 1985–1997 (GM Brasil)
- Model years: 1973–1991
- Assembly: United States; Baltimore Assembly, Baltimore, Maryland; Flint Truck Assembly, Flint, Michigan; Fremont Assembly, Fremont, California; Janesville Assembly, Janesville, Wisconsin; Lakewood Assembly, Lakewood Heights, Atlanta, Georgia; Pontiac, Michigan; Canada: St. Louis Truck Assembly, St. Louis, Missouri; Oshawa Truck Assembly, Oshawa, Ontario; Mexico: Toluca; Argentina: San Martín, Buenos Aires (GM de Argentina); Argentina: Córdoba (Sevel Argentina); Chile: Arica (1978–1988)
- Designer: Bill Mitchell (1970)

Body and chassis
- Body style: 2-door pickup truck 4-door crew cab 2/4-door Chassis cab
- Related: Chevrolet K5 Blazer/GMC Jimmy; Chevrolet/GMC Suburban

Powertrain
- Engine: 250 cu in (4.1 L) I6; 292 cu in (4.8 L) I6; 262 cu in (4.3 L) V6; 305 cu in (5.0 L) V8; 307 cu in (5.0 L) V8; 350 cu in (5.7 L) V8; 366 cu in (6.0 L) V8; 400 cu in (6.6 L) V8; 454 cu in (7.4 L) V8; 350 cu in (5.7 L) Oldsmobile Diesel V8; 379 cu in (6.2 L) Detroit Diesel V8; 236 cu in (3.9 L) Perkins Q.20B Diesel I4 engine Perkins Q.20B Diesel I4 (1985-91) 243 cu in (4.0 L); Maxion S4 Diesel I4 engine #4.0; Maxion S4 Diesel I4 (1992-96); 243 cu in (4.0 L) Maxion S4T Turbodiesel I4 engine #4.0L; Maxion S4T Turbodiesel I4 (1992-94); 248 cu in (4.1 L) Maxion S4T Plus Turbodiesel I4 engine #4.1L; Maxion S4T Plus Turbodiesel I4 (1994-97)
- Transmission: 3-speed Turbo Hydra-Matic 350 automatic 3-speed Turbo Hydra-Matic 400 automatic 4-speed Turbo Hydra-Matic 700R4 automatic 3-speed Saginaw manual 4-speed Saginaw Muncie SM465 manual 4-speed New Process NP833 overdrive manual

Dimensions
- Wheelbase: 117.5 in (2,984 mm); 131.5 in (3,340 mm); 164.5 in (4,178 mm)
- Length: 191.5 in (4,864 mm)(1973–75); 191.3 in (4,859 mm)(1987); 211.8 in (5,380 mm); 246.4 in (6,259 mm)
- Height: 69.8 in (1,773 mm)

Chronology
- Predecessor: GM C/K (Action Line)
- Successor: Chevrolet C/K (fourth generation) (GMT400)

The third generation of the C/K series is a range of trucks that was manufactured by General Motors from the 1973 to 1991 model years. Serving as the replacement for the "Action Line" C/K trucks, GM designated the generation under "Rounded Line" moniker. Again offered as a two-door pickup truck and chassis cab, the Rounded Line trucks marked the introduction of a four-door cab configuration.

Marketed under the Chevrolet and GMC brands, the Rounded Line C/K chassis also served as the basis of GM full-size SUVs, including the Chevrolet/GMC Suburban wagon and the off-road oriented Chevrolet K5 Blazer/GMC Jimmy. The generation also shared body commonality with GM medium-duty commercial trucks.

In early 1987, GM introduced the 1988 fourth-generation C/K to replace the Rounded Line generation, with the company beginning a multi-year transition between the two generations. To eliminate model overlap, the Rounded Line C/K was renamed the R/V series, which remained as a basis for full-size SUVs and heavier-duty pickup trucks. After an 18-year production run (exceeded only in longevity by the Dodge D/W-series/Ram pickup and the Jeep Gladiator/Pickup), the Rounded Line generation was retired after the 1991 model year.

From 1972 to 1991, General Motors produced the Rounded Line C/K (later R/V) series in multiple facilities across the United States and Canada. In South America, the model line was produced in Argentina and Brazil, ending in 1997.

== Development ==
Development of the third-generation C/K trucks began in 1968; vehicle components underwent simulated testing on computers before the first prototype pickups were even built for real-world testing. The finished product would become revolutionary in appearance, breaking away from typical American pickup truck design of the era (including the cab). The exterior design underwent scrutiny in the wind tunnel to optimize its aerodynamics and fuel economy. While distinguished by its straight-lined and boxy appearance, GM named the third-generation C/K the "Rounded Line" series, succeeding the "Action Line" C/K trucks.

The largely rectangular front fascia of the Rounded Line trucks (leading to the colloquial "Square-body" and "Box-body" nicknames from the media and public) led to many departures from previous generations of C/K truck design. As with GM cars, the hood line of the C/K trucks was faired into the front fenders (replacing the clamshell design). While a wraparound windshield (from the Task Force trucks) was never under consideration, a more widely curved windshield (along with curved windshield glass) was added to the cab. To visually integrate the cab with the pickup bed, a shoulder line wrapped from fender to fender around the vehicle (on Fleetside/Wideside beds). Though visually boxier in appearance, the Rounded Line moniker stems from the combination of the wraparound shoulder line and the larger, aerodynamically-shaped windshield.

To further reduce noise, designers removed the mast-style radio antenna, replacing it with a design embedded within the windshield glass. The interior of the C/K trucks underwent major functional changes, replacing the completely flat dashboard with a design closer to its sedans, centering controls and gauges closer to the driver.

== Model history ==
Across its 18-year production, the third-generation C/K model line underwent several minor revisions. For 1981, the trucks underwent a mid-cycle revision. To accommodate the 1987 calendar-year introduction of the fourth-generation C/K for the 1988 model year, GM re-designated the third-generation C/K as the R/V series for 1987. Sold alongside its successor as a way to fill in gaps in the model range, the R/V series was produced through the 1991 model year.

=== 1973–1980 ===
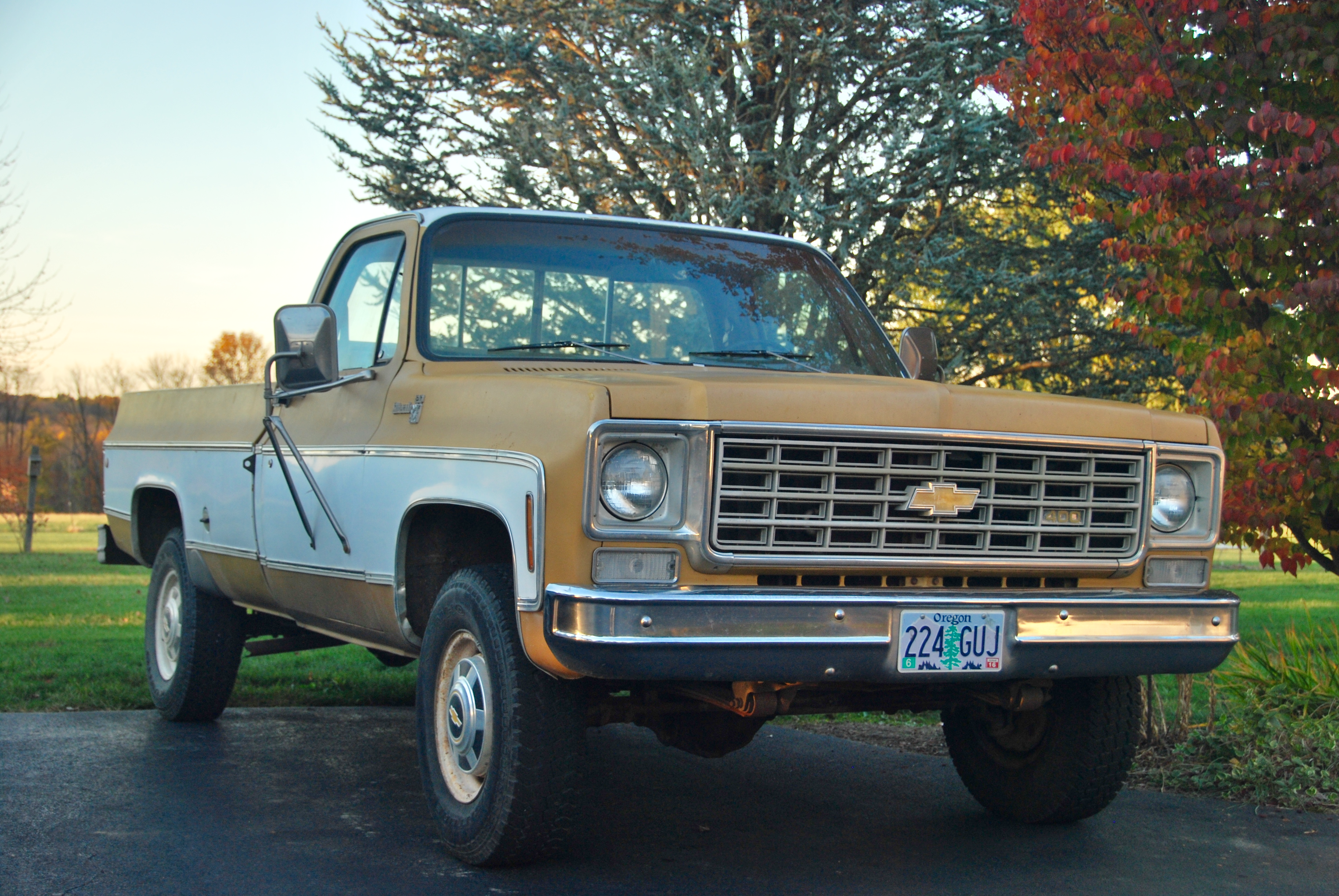
1976 Chevrolet K20 Silverado

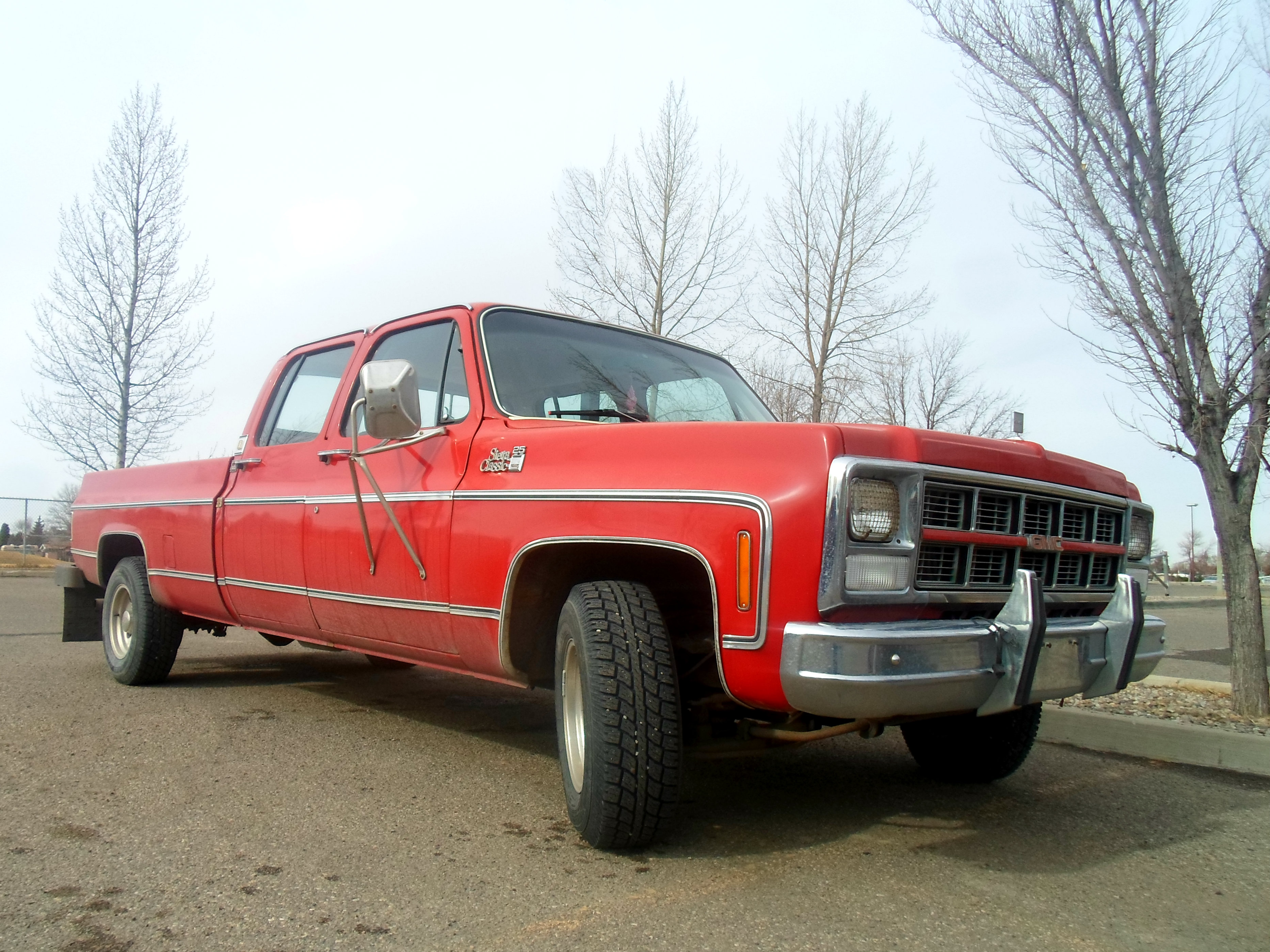
1980 GMC C-2500 Sierra Classic crew cab

For 1973 and 1974, the C/K model line was given a recessed front grille with orange turn signals (GMC grilles were divided in thirds). For 1974, door-mounted drip moldings were added as an option (becoming standard in 1975).

For 1975, the front fascia underwent a minor revision, with Chevrolet replacing the recessed grille with a flush-mounted design (appearing brighter in color); GMC introduced a six-segment grille (splitting the 1973–1974 grille in half). The trim lines underwent a major realignment, as Chevrolet introduced the Scottsdale and Silverado trims. In response to extended-cab Ford and Dodge pickups, a C20 four-door pickup with no rear seat is introduced (dubbed the Bonus Cab), offering additional storage space.

For 1976, engine displacement decals were removed from the grille; a voltage gauge replaced the ammeter in the instrument panel. In another change, the simulated woodgrain exterior trim is discontinued (woodgrain interior trim remains in use for door panels and the dashboard on upper-trim models). The optional wheel covers were revised; a flatter design was introduced for both Chevrolet and GMC with black-painted accents.

For 1977, the front fascia underwent a second revision, with both Chevrolet and GMC receiving larger-segment grille designs. On all trims, the interior received revised door panels (covering a larger portion of the doors). As an option, the C/K offered power windows and power door locks for the first time. The 1978 model year was distinguished by a redesigned fuel-filler door (replacing the exposed fuel cap); woodgrain dash trim (for the Cheyenne and Silverado) was replaced by brushed-aluminum trim.

For 1979, the front fascia underwent a minor facelift. While sharing the same stamping as before, the vertical bars were painted dark gray; chrome trim incorporated the turn signal lenses, giving chrome to nearly the entire front fascia. In line with Fleetside/Wideside trucks, Stepside/Fenderside and Big Dooley trucks replace exposed fuel caps with fuel-tank doors

For 1980, the front fascia underwent an additional update. While GMC trucks carried over the same grille from 1979, Chevrolet trucks received an all-new grille (its first completely new design since 1974). Square headlights made their appearance for the first time on Silverado-trim models; lower-trim vehicles used a combination of the 1980 grille and the 1979 (round) headlight surround.

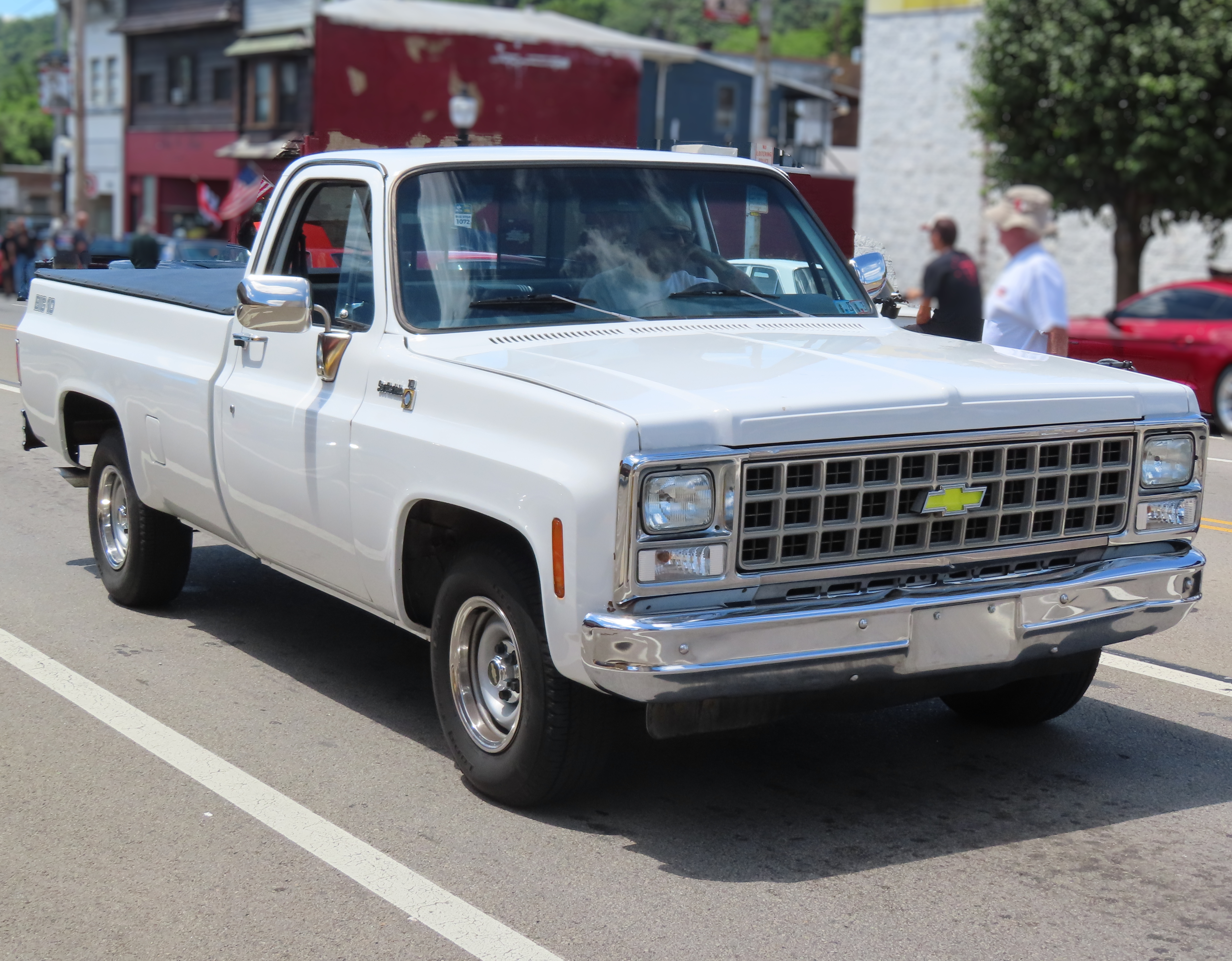
1980 Chevrolet BIG 10 Scottsdale

=== 1981 facelift ===
The Rounded Line trucks underwent a mid-cycle redesign for the 1981 model year. Largely in response to the 1979 energy crisis, GM engineers again turned to wind tunnels to further reduce areas that hindered air flow and caused drag, along with shedding nearly 300 pounds of curb weight from the model line.

While design changes were largely evolutionary (to preserve sales of the highly profitable model line), the body of the C/K trucks was completely reshaped forward of the windshield. While retaining a distinct shoulder line wrapping around the body, the front fenders were reshaped to include a lowered hoodline (relocating the side marker lights); the windshield wipers were now exposed.

As part of the body facelift, the 1981 C/K pickup trucks received new grilles and redesigned front bumpers; Chevrolet grilles were split in the middle by a silver/black bar, with GMC grilles divided into ten squares. Square headlights became standard for the first time; base-trim trucks were fitted with two headlights and upper-trim trucks received four headlights (relocating the turn signal lenses to the front bumper). For the first time since 1975, fender badging was revised, with scripted badging replaced by block lettering (a design that would last through 1987). The interior underwent its own revision, receiving updates to the seats, door panels, and dashboard. The chassis cab option was discontinued on the C10 for 1981.

For 1982, the front fascia underwent a trim revision, with a chrome bumper and a chrome-trim front grille becoming standard equipment. In a functional change, 3/4-ton and 1-ton trucks switched from 16.5-inch to 16-inch wheels (to adopt more commercially available tires). To denote the introduction of a 6.2 L diesel V8, vehicles with the diesel engine received specific fender and tailgate badging.

For 1983, the front fascia underwent a minor revision. Along with dropping the two-headlight configuration, Chevrolet and GMC received revised grilles (including the turn signals behind them). For 1984, the two-headlamp configuration returned for base-trim vehicles (relocating the turn signals from the grille to the headlamp surround).

For 1985, the grille was changed for the last time (as the C/K). On two-tone Chevrolet trucks, the center of the grille was painted body-color (in place of silver); for the first time, C/K half-ton trucks were offered with optional cast-aluminum wheels.

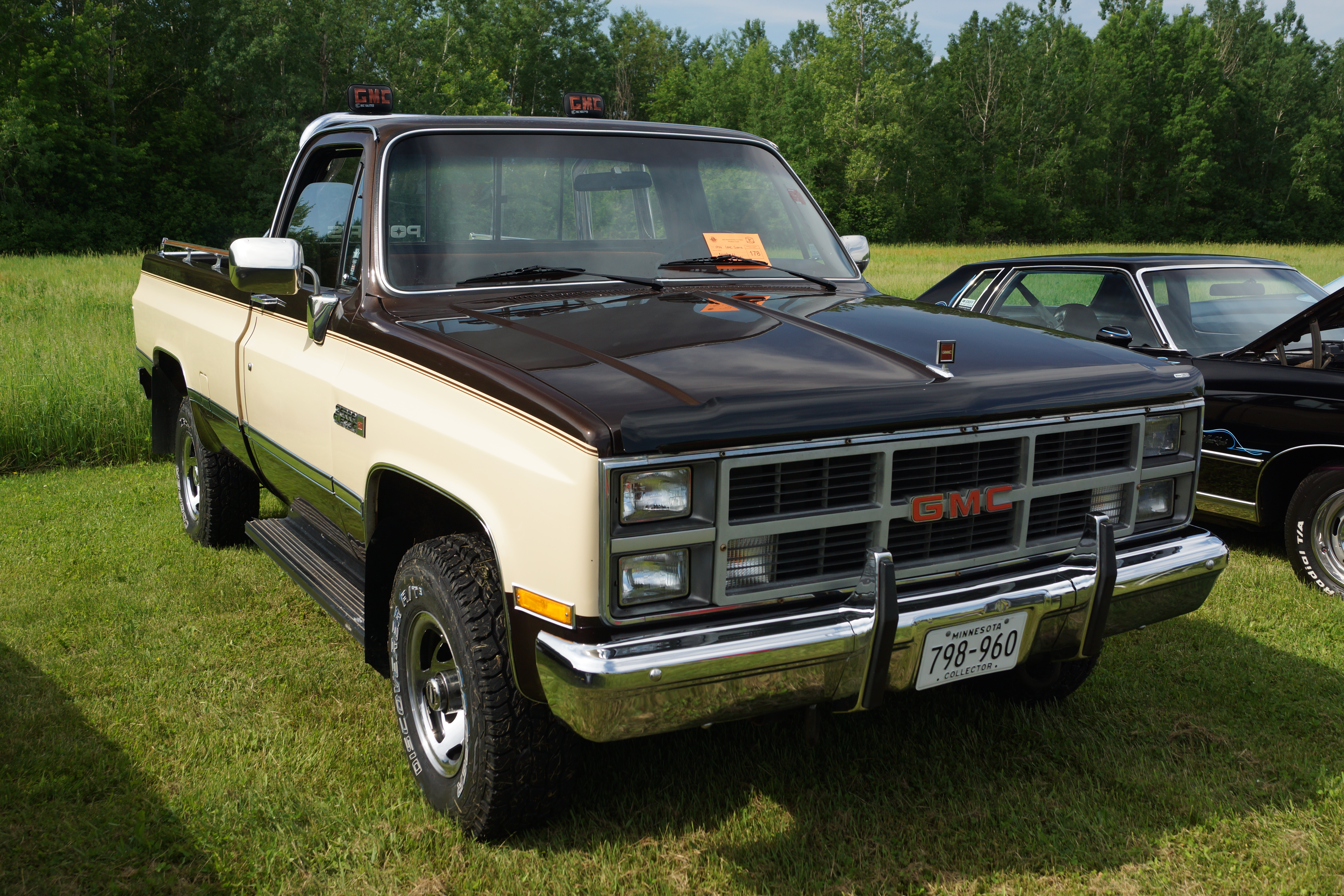
1984 GMC K-1500 Sierra Classic

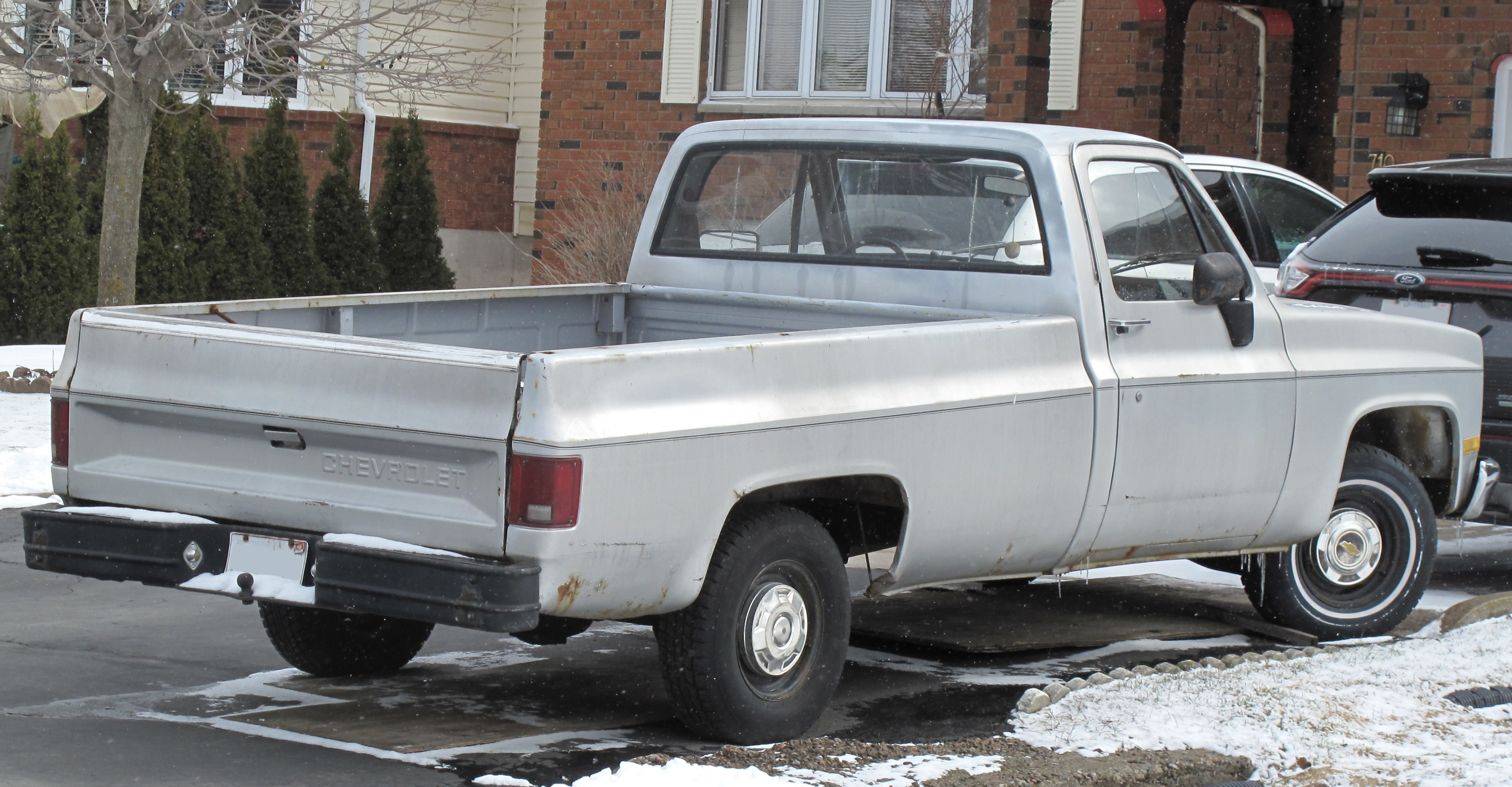
1984 Chevrolet C10 Custom Deluxe, rear view

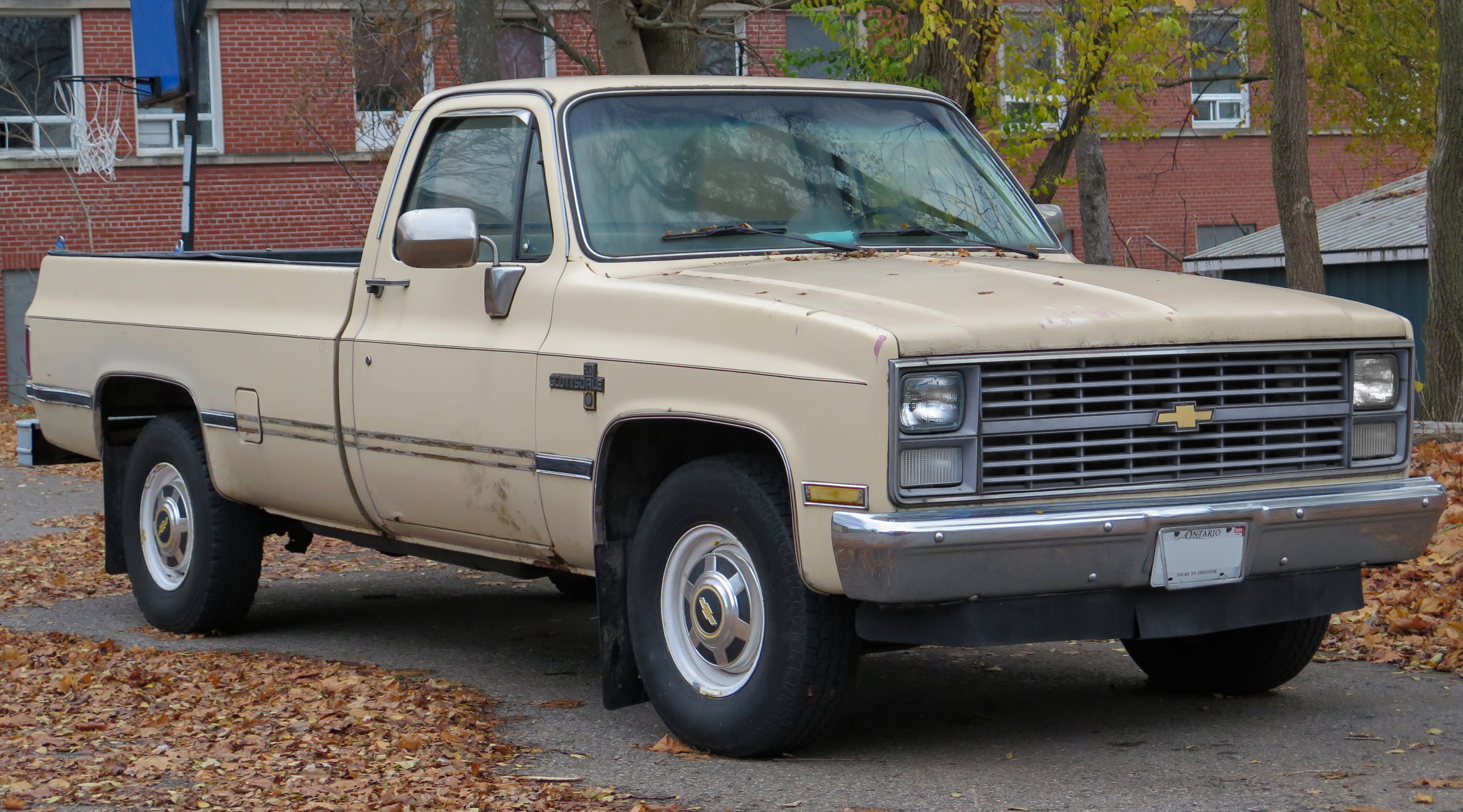
1984 Chevrolet C20 Scottsdale

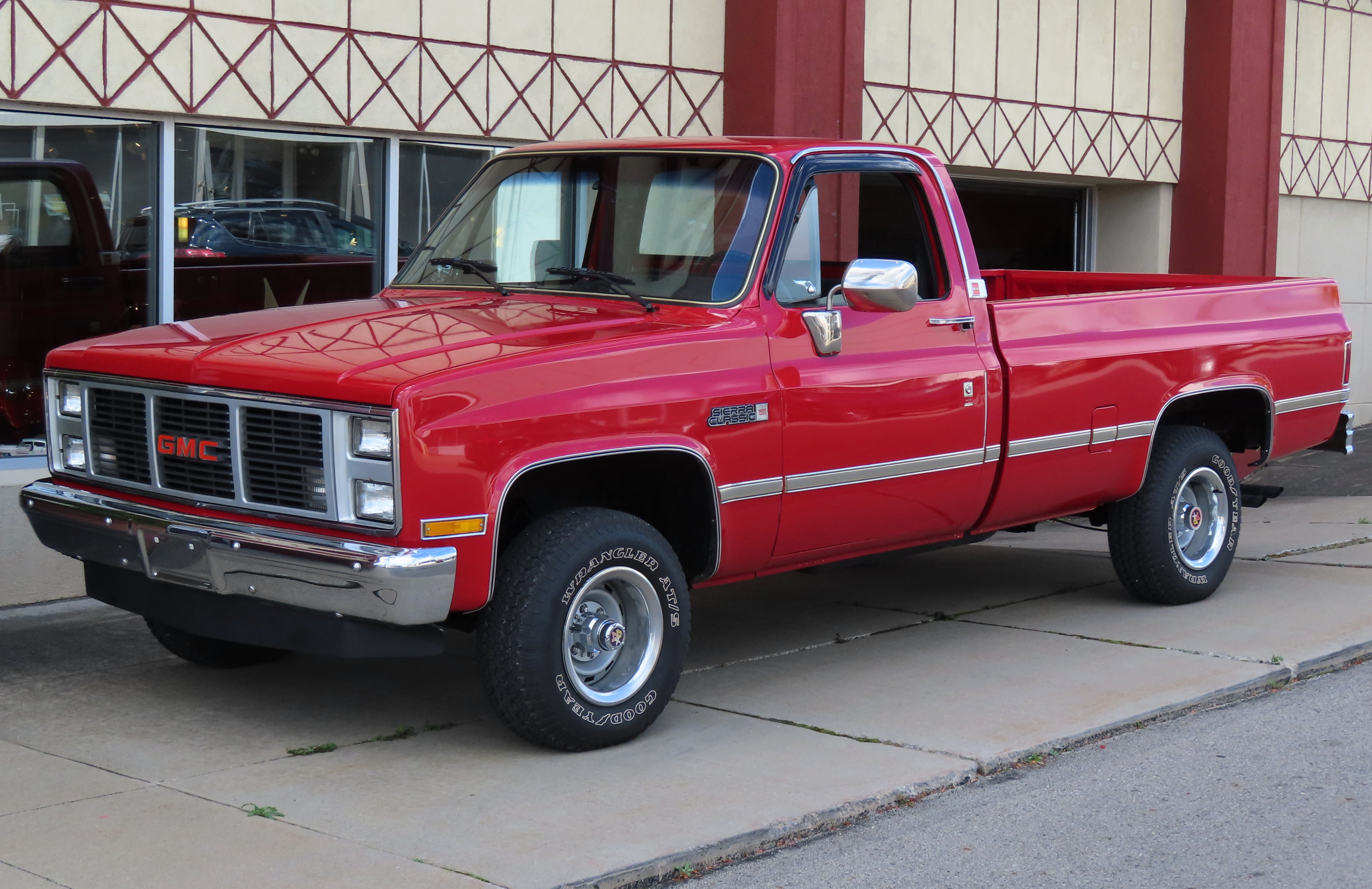
1985 GMC K-1500 Sierra Classic

=== R/V-Series (1987–1991) ===
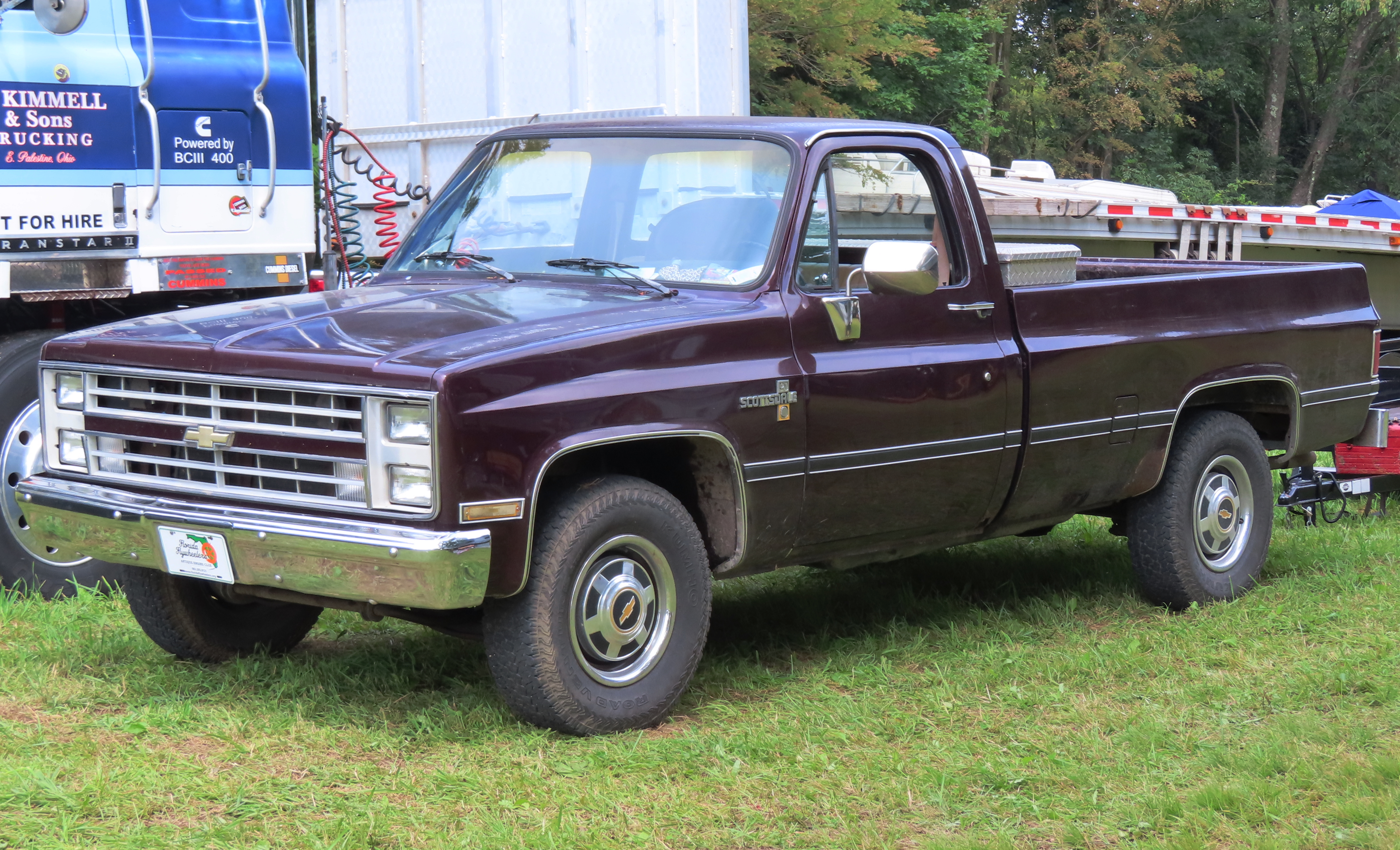
1987 Chevrolet R20 Scottsdale

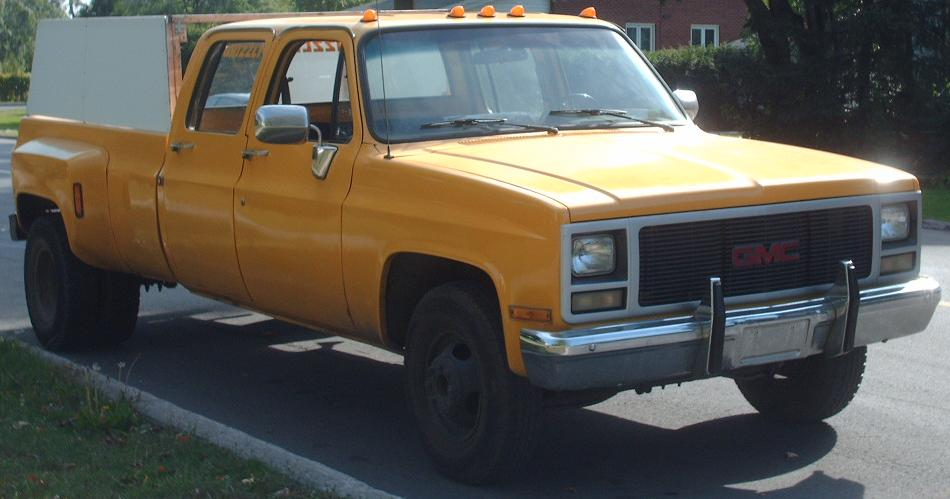
1990-1991 GMC R3500 SL crew-cab

For 1987, GM began the transition of replacing the Rounded-Line C/K. Though officially sold as 1988 model-year vehicles, the GMT400 generation was launched in April 1987, functionally allowing GM to market two full-size truck lines. The Rounded-Line series was redesignated as the R/V series ("R" = rear-wheel drive; "V" = 4x4) as its successor adopted the C/K moniker; the change was also applied to the vehicle identification number (VIN) of both generations. The 1987 R/V models continued production at Janesville, St. Louis, and Flint; the new 1988 GMT400 trucks entered production December 8, 1986, at Pontiac East, Oshawa, and the new Fort Wayne plant.

For 1988, to shift buyers to the new-generation C/K trucks, regular-cab R/V trucks were discontinued (with the exception of V-series 1-ton trucks and R/V chassis cabs). In a visible exterior change, all R/V-series vehicles received a fender-mounted radio mast antenna, deleting the windshield-integrated unit used since 1973. The R-series 1/2-ton pickup became exclusive to Mexico, known as the Chevrolet Cheyenne 2500 (produced through 1991). As part of the nomenclature change, Chevrolet renamed its full-size SUVs, with the Blazer/Jimmy dropping the K5 prefix.

For 1989, R/V-series pickup trucks/SUVs underwent their most visible facelift since 1981. While the front fenders and hood were carried over, the grille was redesigned for a nearly flush appearance (taking on a similar design to its GMT400 successor), with much of the grille trim painted black. Following the trim nomenclature of the GMT400, Chevrolet replaced the Custom Deluxe with the return of the Cheyenne (the Silverado remained in place) while GMC replaced both the standard Sierra and Sierra Classic with the SL and SLE, respectively. In contrast with its successor, both the Chevrolet Scottsdale and GMC High Sierra middle trim levels were eliminated with no direct replacement. Lower-trim R/V trucks were fitted with dual-headlamp grilles while higher-trim vehicles featured quad headlamps. In another major revision, Chevrolet adopted GMC's payload nomenclature, with the R20 and R/V30 being replaced with the R2500 and R/V3500 respectively. In a branding change, GMC dropped the R/V nomenclature externally (though it remained in for the VIN). In another discontinuation, the regular-cab pickup truck was discontinued entirely.

For 1990, the R/V series was pared down further, losing the 2500-series crew cab and the 3500-series regular-cab chassis cab truck. Janesville Assembly produced 3500-series crew cabs (chassis cabs and pickup trucks); Flint Truck Assembly produced the Suburban wagon and K5 Blazer/V-Jimmy. While the Suburban was sold in 1500 and 2500-series, the Blazer/Jimmy was sold only in a 1500 payload series. As a running change during 1990 production, the medium-duty variant of the Rounded Line C/K generation was discontinued, with GM moving its commercial trucks to the GMT530 architecture (replacing the C50-C70/7000, Chevrolet Kodiak/GMC TopKick, and the GMC Brigadier under a single product range).

1991 marked the final year of the Rounded Line full-size truck generation after an 18-year production run. After trailing the introduction of the GMT400 C/K for four years, the R/V series consisted of 3500-series crew-cab trucks (pickup trucks and chassis cabs), the 1500-series Blazer/Jimmy SUVs, and the 1500/2500-series Suburban wagon (both Chevrolet and GMC). In a functional change, the 700R4 transmission was replaced by the electronically-controlled 4L80E unit.

For 1992, the R/V series vehicles were moved to the GMT400 architecture, with GM introducing both crew-cab and SUV bodies to the platform. To end nameplate confusion with its smaller SUV lines, GMC renamed the full-size Jimmy as the GMC Yukon for 1992; Chevrolet renamed the full-size Blazer as the Chevrolet Tahoe for 1995.

== Model overview ==
The third-generation C/K series was marketed by Chevrolet and GMC divisions. Marketed primarily as pickup trucks, the C/K trucks were also offered as chassis cab vehicles. Marketed in 1/2-ton, 3/4-ton, and 1-ton (nominal) payload series, C/K pickup trucks were offered in two cab designs, three bed configurations, and three wheelbase lengths.

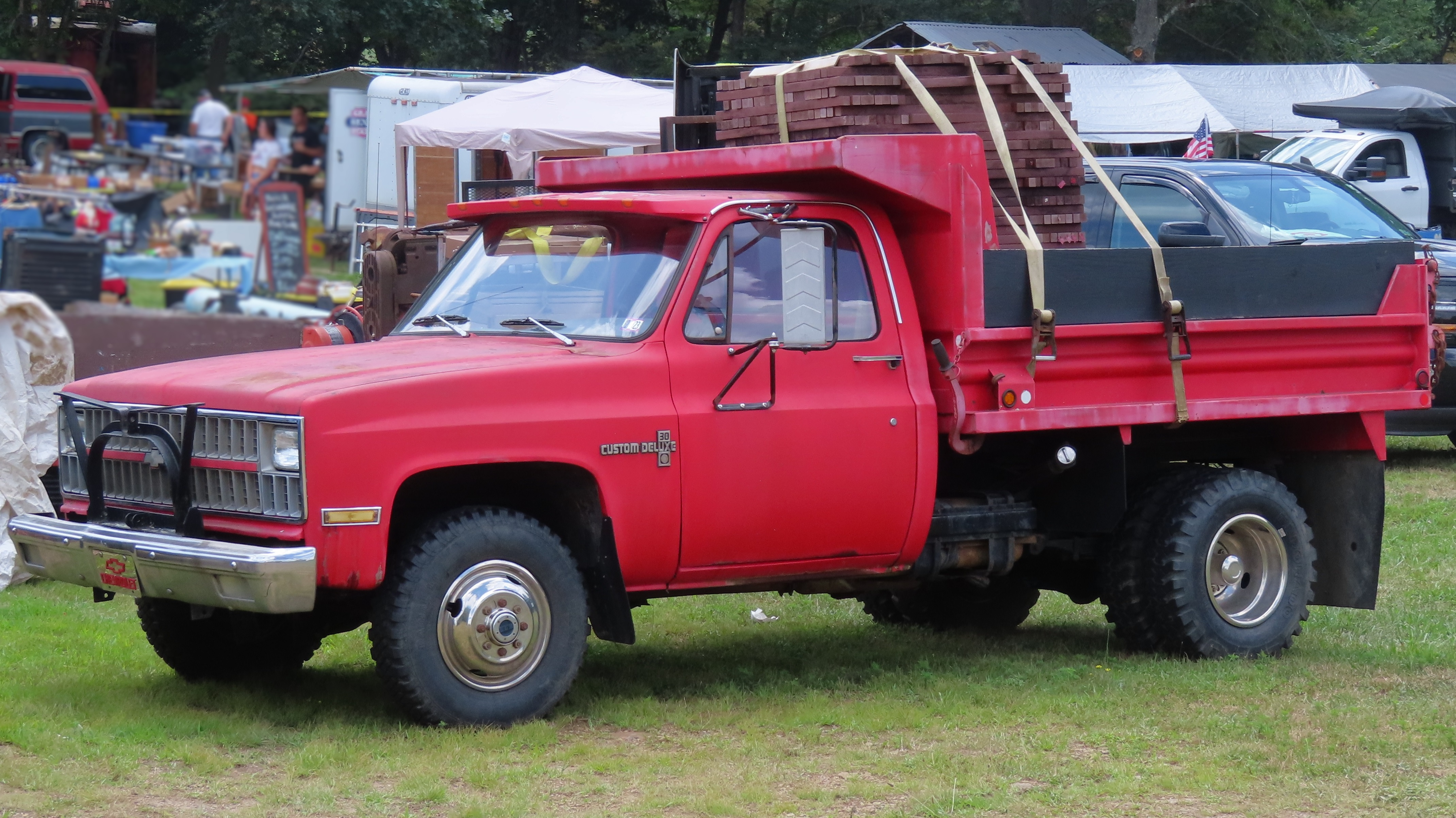
1982 Chevrolet K30 Custom Deluxe chassis cab dump truck

In response to the introduction of the Ford F-150, the Chevrolet "Big 10" high-GVWR 1/2-ton was introduced for 1976.

=== Chassis ===
Third-generation C/K pickups have a high tensile strength carbon steel ladder type frame with a "drop center" design. The steering system is a variable-ratio recirculating ball steering gear; hydraulic power assist was optional.

On all pickup trucks, the model line was fitted with front self-adjusting disc brakes and rear finned drum brakes. Power-assisted brakes, with either four-wheel hydraulic Hydra-Boost or Vacuum-Boost power assist, were standard on all models except C10, where they were optional.

C-Series pickups included two-wheel drive and featured an independent front suspension (IFS) system with contoured lower control "A" arms and coil springs. Rear suspension (marketed as Load Control by GM) was dual-stage multi-leaf springs supporting a live rear axle, replacing the coil-spring configuration (on 1/2- and 3/4-ton models) of the previous two generations. To further stabilize the rear axle under loads or acceleration, the rear shock absorbers were placed asymmetrically from one another (on each side of the rear axle). The optional Camper Special package (available on 3/4- and 1-ton pickups) added heavier duty springs, shocks, and sway bars to increase maximum payload to accommodate slide-in pickup truck campers.

The wheelbase length was extended to 117.5 in (2,985 mm) for short wheelbase pickups, and 131.5 in (3,340 mm) for long wheelbase pickups. For 1-ton pickups, a dual-rear-wheel option (called "Big Dooley") with a 10,000-pound GVWR was introduced, alongside a four-door crew-cab; the latter used a 164.5-inch wheelbase on either single or dual rear wheels.

==== Towing ====
Towing and payload capacity ratings for Rounded Line C/K-Series pickups varied (dependent on configuration). Factors such as engine and transmission combination, differential gear ratio, curb weight, and whether the pickup was two-wheel drive or four-wheel drive decided how much the pickup could safely tow or haul.

A properly equipped C-Series half-ton class pickup could tow up to 8,000 lbs (4 tons) of braked trailer, while a properly equipped C-Series three-quarter-ton or one-ton class pickup could tow up to 12,000 lbs (6 tons) of braked trailer. Adding four-wheel drive reduced towing capability due to increased curb weight, which resulted from additional driveline components (transfer case, front axle, front differential, front propeller shaft, and so on) needed to facilitate four-wheel drive. A properly equipped K-Series half-ton or three quarter-ton class pickup could tow up to 6,500 lbs (3.25 tons) of braked trailer; a properly equipped K-Series one-ton class pickup could tow 500 lbs more, up to 7,000 lbs (3.5 tons) of braked trailer.

Heavy-duty towing equipment was available for both C and K-Series pickups, such as the Trailering Special package (included power steering, uprated battery, and uprated generator), 7-pin trailer electrics connector, heavy-duty engine oil cooler, heavy-duty transmission oil cooler, and a weight distributing trailer hitch. An optional Elimipitch camper was made available for the Big Dooley.

=== Powertrain ===
At its 1973 launch, the Rounded-Line pickup trucks were offered with five different engines. A 250-cubic-inch inline-six was standard, with the option of a 292-cubic-inch inline-6, a 307-cubic-inch V8, a 350-cubic-inch V8, and a 454-cubic-inch V8. Available only in two-wheel-drive C-series trucks, the 454 replaced the 402-cubic-inch "396" V8; the 307 was offered only for 1973.

During the 1970s, the model range underwent several revisions to its powertrain line. For 1975, a 400-cubic-inch V8 was introduced as the largest engine option for K-series trucks, slotted above the 350; in another change, catalytic converters were fitted to all trucks under 6000 lbs GVWR. The 250-cubic-inch inline-six was discontinued on 3/4- and 1-ton models for 1975. For 1977, a 305-cubic-inch V8 was introduced for C-series half-ton trucks, expanding the engine range to six. For 1978, General Motors became the first major American manufacturer to market a light-duty truck with a diesel engine, offering a 350-cubic-inch Oldsmobile diesel V8 as an option for half-ton C-series trucks; the engine also marked the launch of the Oldsmobile diesel engine family. Unlike modern American diesel pickups, the Oldsmobile diesel was designed to prioritize efficiency over power, having a lower tow rating than the equivalent gasoline model. The 250-cubic-inch inline-six also returned on regular-cab C20 models for 1978 in California, and 1979 in the rest of the US.

During the 1980s, the C/K trucks saw additional revisions to the powertrain line, shifting towards more advanced engine designs. The 454-cubic-inch V8 was discontinued on models below 8,501 pounds GVWR for 1980. As part of the 1981 model revision, the 454 V8 became available on one-ton K-series trucks for the first time, replacing the 400 V8 entirely. To improve its fuel efficiency, the 305 V8 received electronic spark control (in markets outside of California); the 350 became the standard V8 for K10 only in California and only when mated to a 700r4 trans and only with 2.73 or 3.08 axle ratio. The 350 was not offered on the C10 pickup from 1981 to 1986 in the US.

For 1982, the Oldsmobile 350 diesel was replaced by a 379-cubic-inch (6.2 L) Detroit Diesel V8, which was available on 3/4-ton and 1-ton trucks in addition to the 1/2-ton model. To further improve fuel economy, an automatic overdrive transmission was made available: the four-speed Turbo Hydra-Matic 700R4.

For 1985, the long-running 250 inline-6 (the standard C/K engine since 1966) was replaced by the 262-cubic-inch (4.3 L) V6.

As the Rounded-Line series were redesignated the R/V trucks for 1987, several changes were made to the powertrain line. The 292 I6 was dropped from 3/4-ton and 1-ton trucks, with the 4.3 L V6 becoming the sole 6-cylinder engine; all engines adopted fuel injection (with the exception of the 6.2 L diesel which already had it). In addition, a "smart" powertrain control module (PCM) was also introduced, which controlled the fuel injection system, fuel-to-air burn ratio, engine ignition timing, and (if equipped with an automatic transmission) the Turbo Hydra-Matic's turbine torque converter clutch.

Following the transition of pickups to the fourth-generation GMT400 chassis, the R/V series was offered with four engines in 1987: a 5.0 L V8 5.7 L V8 7.4 L V8 or the 6.2 L diesel V8, with all gasoline engines having TBI fuel injection. The L03 305 option was eliminated after 1987 and from 1988-1991 the 3 engines available were the 5.7, 6.2 diesel, or the 7.4

Chevrolet/GMC C/K powertrain details (1973–1991)
Engine	Engine family	Production	Code (RPO)	Output		Notes
Engine	Engine family	Production	Code (RPO)	Horsepower	Torque	Notes
250 cu in (4.1 L) I6	Chevrolet Turbo-Thrift	1973–1979	LD4	105 hp (78 kW)	185 lb⋅ft (251 N⋅m)	1-bbl Monojet carburetor; "Integrated" cylinder head introduced in 1975
250 cu in (4.1 L) I6	Chevrolet Turbo-Thrift	1979–1984	LE3	130 hp (97 kW)	210 lb⋅ft (285 N⋅m)	2-bbl Varajet carburetor; "Integrated" cylinder head
262 cu in (4.3 L) V6	Chevrolet 90° V6	1985–1986	LB1	155 hp (116 kW)	230 lb⋅ft (312 N⋅m)	4-bbl
262 cu in (4.3 L) V6	Chevrolet 90° V6	1987	LB4	155 hp (116 kW)	230 lb⋅ft (312 N⋅m)	TBI
292 cu in (4.8 L) I6	Chevrolet Turbo-Thrift	1973–1986	L25	120 hp (89 kW)	215 lb⋅ft (292 N⋅m)	1-bbl Monojet carburetor
305 cu in (5.0 L) V8	Chevrolet small-block V8	1977–1980	LE9	160 hp (120 kW)	235 lb⋅ft (319 N⋅m)	49-state (4-bbl)
305 cu in (5.0 L) V8	Chevrolet small-block V8	1981–1986	LF3	155 hp (116 kW)	240 lb⋅ft (325 N⋅m)	California emissions
305 cu in (5.0 L) V8	Chevrolet small-block V8	1981–1986	LG9	130 hp (97 kW)	240 lb⋅ft (325 N⋅m)	2-bbl
305 cu in (5.0 L) V8	Chevrolet small-block V8	1987	L03	170 hp (130 kW)	260 lb⋅ft (353 N⋅m)	TBI
307 cu in (5.0 L) V8	Chevrolet small-block V8	1973	LG8	130 hp (97 kW)	220 lb⋅ft (298 N⋅m)	49-state
350 cu in (5.7 L) V8	Chevrolet small-block V8	1973–1986	LS9	175 hp (130 kW)	275 lb⋅ft (373 N⋅m)	4-bbl
350 cu in (5.7 L) V8	Chevrolet small-block V8	1973–1986	LT9	160 hp (120 kW)	260 lb⋅ft (353 N⋅m)	4-bbl; 3/4 and 1-ton chassis
350 cu in (5.7 L) V8	Chevrolet small-block V8	1987–1991	L05	210 hp (160 kW)	300 lb⋅ft (407 N⋅m)	TBI; R/V series
350 cu in (5.7 L) V8	Oldsmobile Diesel V8	1978–1981	LF9	120 hp (89 kW)	220 lb⋅ft (298 N⋅m)	naturally-aspirated diesel; indirect injection C-series 1/2-ton chassis only
379 cu in (6.2 L) V8	Detroit Diesel V8	1982–1991	LH4	135 hp (101 kW)	240 lb⋅ft (325 N⋅m)	naturally-aspirated diesel; indirect injection
379 cu in (6.2 L) V8	Detroit Diesel V8	1982–1991	LH6	135 hp (101 kW)	240 lb⋅ft (325 N⋅m)	naturally-aspirated diesel; indirect injection
379 cu in (6.2 L) V8	Detroit Diesel V8	1982–1991	LL4	148 hp (110 kW)	246 lb⋅ft (334 N⋅m)	naturally-aspirated diesel; indirect injection
400 cu in (6.6 L) V8	Chevrolet small-block V8	1975–1980	LF4	185 hp (138 kW)	300 lb⋅ft (407 N⋅m)	equipped for HD emissions only K-series only
454 cu in (7.4 L) V8	Chevrolet big-block V8 (Mark IV)	1973–1986	LE8	230 hp (170 kW)	360 lb⋅ft (488 N⋅m)	4-bbl; C-series trucks only before 1981
454 cu in (7.4 L) V8	Chevrolet big-block V8 (Mark IV)	1987–1991	L19	230 hp (170 kW)	385 lb⋅ft (522 N⋅m)	TBI; R/V series

==== Four-wheel-drive systems ====
Throughout their production, K-series (later V-series) pickup trucks included multiple four-wheel-drive systems. All K-series pickups featured four-corner Vari-Rate multi-leaf springs, front live axle with symmetrical (inline) shock absorber geometry, and the Load Control rear suspension system. K-series pickups also featured an off-road oriented design, with the transfer case bolted directly to the transmission and running gear tucked up as high as possible under the vehicle to reduce the chances of snagging vital components on obstacles, as well as to achieve a low silhouette and optimal ground clearance. Exposed brake lines wrapped in steel were standard, with underbody skid plate armor optional for further protection.

===== Conventional =====
Offered as standard equipment for K-series trucks with inline-6 engines, the conventional four-wheel-drive system was equipped with a two-speed New Process 205 transfer case with four drive modes: Two High, Four High, Neutral, and Four Low. Two High gave a 0:100 torque split, while Four High yielded a locked 50:50 torque split. Four Low applied reduction gearing. The front and rear propeller shafts were locked at all times in Four High and Four Low. Neutral allowed for flat towing, or use of the power take-off (PTO).

====== Shift-on-the-move (1981–1991) ======
A new Shift-on-the-move four-wheel-drive system with two-speed dual range New Process 208 aluminium transfer case was introduced on K-series pickups for the 1981 model year. It replaced the permanent four-wheel-drive system, on pre-1980 models. The shift-on-the-move four-wheel-drive system featured new automatic self locking hubs and synchronized direct high range planetary gearing, such that the truck could be shifted from two-wheel drive, to fully locked four-wheel drive at speeds of up to 25 mph. Once the shift from two-wheel drive to four-wheel drive was made, the vehicle could be driven at any forward or reverse speed. Four drive modes were offered: Two High, Four High, Neutral, and Four Low. Two High gave a 0:100 torque split, with Four High yielding a locked 50:50 torque split through direct synchronized gearing. Four Low applied reduction gearing with a 2.61:1 ratio, compared to the previous New Process 205's 1.96:1. The front and rear propeller shafts were locked at all times in Four High and Four Low. Neutral was provided for disengagement of both propeller shafts. Conventional four-wheel drive was still available with manual locking hubs.

===== Full-time (1973–1979) =====
Full-time four-wheel-drive pickups featured a two-speed New Process 203 transfer case with center differential and lock. Five positions were provided: High Loc, High, Neutral, Low, and Low Loc. In High the center differential was unlocked and allowed the front and rear propeller shafts to slip as needed for full-time operation. The system could be manually shifted into High Loc which locked the center differential for a locked 50:50 torque split. Low and Low Loc applied reduction gearing with or without lock, depending on the mode selected. Neutral was also available for use of the PTO.

A new Eaton Automatic Differential Lock (ADL) was introduced in 1973 as an optional extra on the Rounded-Line C/K-Series pickups, for the rear hypoid differential. The new automatic locking differential was offered under the G86 code, replacing the Eaton NoSpin differential, and eventually replacing the old Positraction limited-slip differential in 1974, at which point it assumed the G80 code. The Eaton ADL featured intelligent differential control via an internal governor which monitored vehicle speed and wheel slip to know when to automatically lock and could lockup 100 percent at or below 20 mph (32 km/h) increasing tractive effort. The differential lock would unlock and deactivate at speeds above 20 mph for safety reasons, such as the vehicle being on dry pavement.

For 1977, a K30 (four-wheel-drive, full one-ton chassis) was added to the lineup, and a Dana 60 was used for the front axle. For the 1980 model year, full-time four-wheel drive was discontinued on K-Series, leaving only conventional four-wheel drive.

=== Body design ===
The third-generation C/K marked several firsts to the model line. Alongside the two-door regular cab, a four-door crew cab made its debut. While trailing Dodge, Ford, and International by a decade in bringing a crew cab pickup truck to production, the C/K crew cab shared its body construction with the Suburban wagon (giving it four passenger doors for the first time). Derived from the C/K chassis cab, "Big Dooley" was the first factory-produced dual-rear-wheel pickup, sold only as a one-ton truck.

Five different bed designs were offered, with 6 1/2- and 8-foot versions of the Chevrolet Fleetside (GMC Wideside) and Chevrolet Stepside (GMC Fenderside); to cover its extra set of rear tires, "Big Dooley" was a hybrid of the two designs, offered only in an 8-foot length. In addition to the larger rear fenders, the "Big Dooley" included identification lights on the roof, tailgate, and fenders as mandated by the United States Department of Transportation for vehicles over 80 inches wide, which all future dual-rear-wheel pickup trucks would also include.

==== Interior ====
Soft-touch materials were used throughout the passenger cabin, such as the dashboard, doors (arm rests), steering wheel, and shift levers. Subtle grained interior panels and bright metal work was used on the inside with high-quality materials also used on the outside, like chrome, aluminum, and polished stainless steel, particularly on top-of-the-line luxury Silverado or Sierra Classic trim levels. Custom Vinyl vinyl or soft Custom Cloth cloth and velour seating surfaces were used along with fabric headliners, door inserts, and plush carpeting, depending on the trim level. Upper class trim levels also used acoustic deadening materials for quieter ride comfort. From model years 1973 to 1977, chestnut wood grain inserts were used on the dashboard and doors for further visual enhancement. The wood grain inserts were replaced by bright brushed aluminum inserts for model years 1978 to 1987. A Delco AM/FM audio sound system and an all-season climate control system were optional extras.

The four-door crew cab was offered in two configurations. Along with the standard six-seat (badged as "3+3") crew cab, a "Bonus Cab" configuration was offered, deleting the rear seat of the crew cab (effectively a 3-seat truck with a large internal storage area).

=== Trim ===
The usage of the C/K nomenclature was carried over from the previous generation, with "C" denoting two-wheel drive trucks and "K" denoting four-wheel drive vehicles. Chevrolet trucks were denoted in a 10/20/30 series (for 1/2-ton, 3/4-ton, and 1-ton); GMC trucks returned as a 1500/2500/3500 series (badged 15/25/35 from 1973–80). While the Chevrolet Cheyenne and GMC Sierra names were carried over from the previous generation, this generation marked the introduction of the Chevrolet Silverado and Chevrolet Scottsdale trims.

==== Chevrolet ====
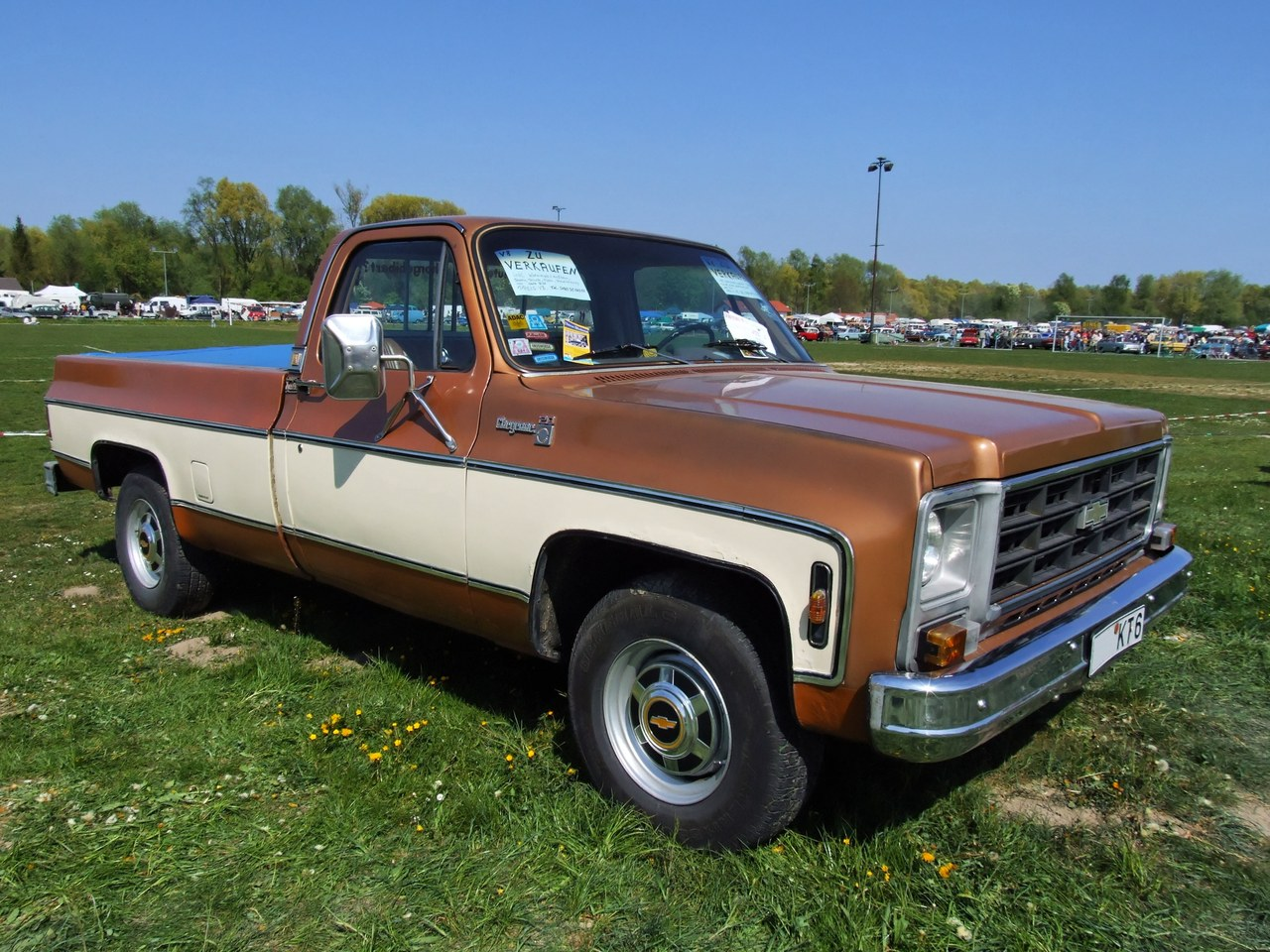
Chevrolet C20 Cheyenne (modified with mandated European marker lights)

Chevrolet marketed its C/K pickups under four trim levels for 1973, carried over from the previous generation. The standard trim was the Custom, slotted below the Custom Deluxe; the top two trims were the Cheyenne and Cheyenne Super.

The Custom was a basic vehicle with minimal exterior and interior trim, with the Custom Deluxe upgrading by adding color-keyed upholstery and interior trim and additional chrome trim. Intended for personal use, the Cheyenne and Cheyenne Super added carpeting, a headliner, and additional sound insulation; the Super offered the most interior trim on the door panels.

For 1975, Chevrolet revised its C/K trim lines, with two making an appearance for the first time. The Scottsdale was slotted above the Custom Deluxe (which replaced the Custom as the base trim) and the Silverado replaced the Cheyenne Super as the flagship trim. For 1982, Chevrolet discontinued the Cheyenne trim line, largely consolidating it with the Silverado. The Cheyenne name returned for 1988, serving as the base trim of the fourth-generation C/K, alongside the R/V pickup and Suburban.

During the 1970s and early 1980s, Chevrolet marketed the Bonanza appearance package coupled with the Scottsdale (and later Silverado) trim, adding upgrades such as interior carpeting.

==== GMC ====
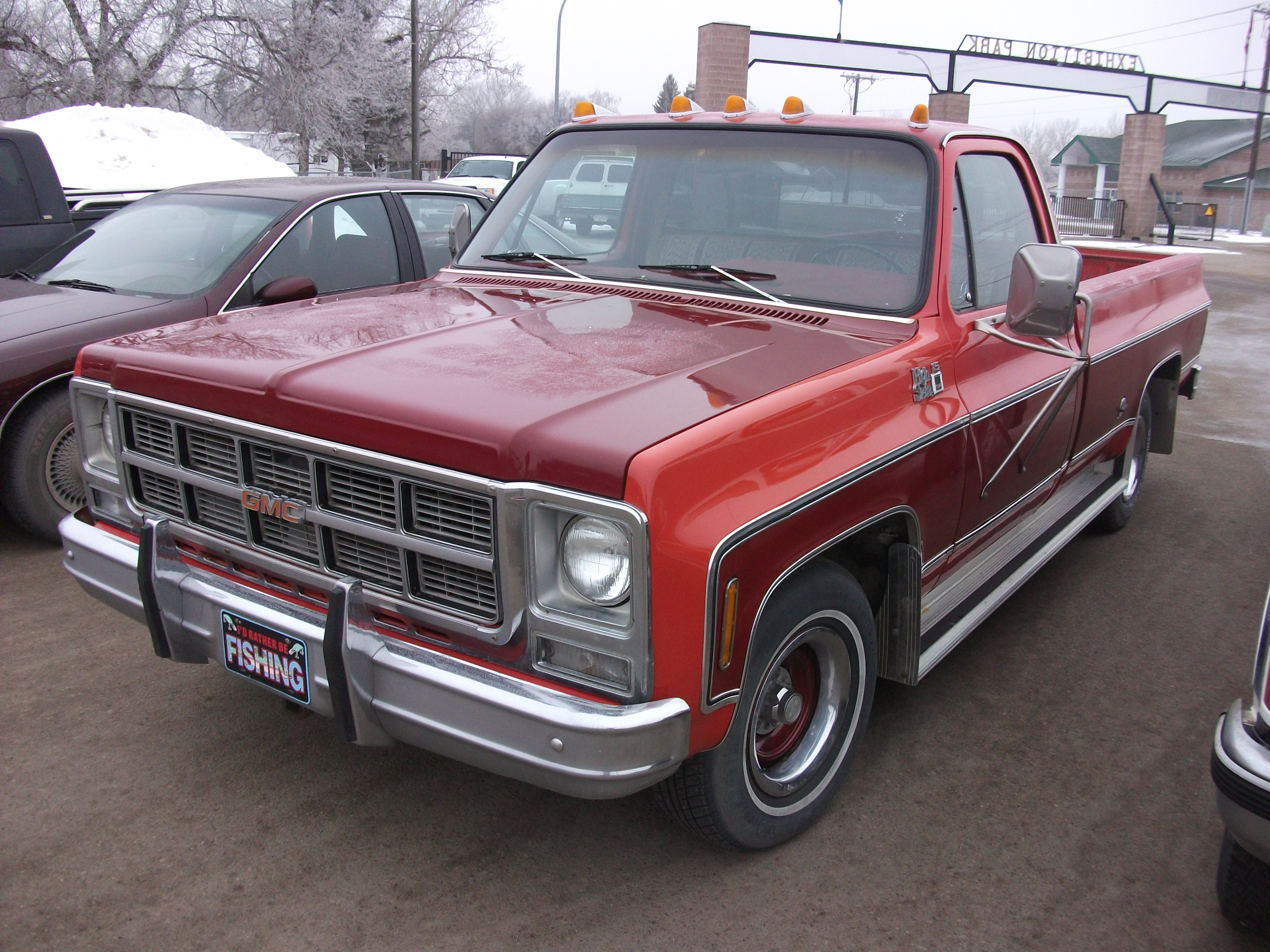
GMC High Sierra

In line with Chevrolet, GMC introduced four trim levels for its third-generation C/K pickup trucks. Custom served as a base trim (the only name in common with Chevrolet) below Super Custom. As a counterpart of the Cheyenne and Cheyenne Super, GMC offered the Sierra and Sierra Grande, respectively. For 1975, in a revision of its C/K line, all GMC pickups became Sierras, with the Sierra becoming the base trim, followed by the Sierra Grande, High Sierra, and Sierra Classic.

For 1982, GMC followed suit with Chevrolet, downsizing to a three-trim line; the Sierra Grande was dropped. For the fourth-generation C/K, GMC dropped the external C/K nomenclature, with all pickup trucks becoming Sierras (C/K remaining in use for internal model codes). For 1989, GMC adopted the trim nomenclature of the fourth-generation C/K for the R/V series pickups.

In line with the Chevrolet Bonanza, GMC offered the Royal Sierra appearance package, coupled with the Sierra Grande and High Sierra; in Canada, GMC offered several Sierra Wrangler exterior appearance packages (prior to the use of the name by Jeep).

== Variants ==
Alongside the full-size pickup range, the "Rounded Line" C/K series also included a variety of other vehicles. The C/K (and R/V) chassis and body were used for the Chevrolet/GMC Suburban, the Chevrolet K5 Blazer/GMC Jimmy, and multiple GM commercial trucks for the 1970s, the 1980s, and the beginning of the 1990s.

=== Medium-duty trucks (1973–1989) ===
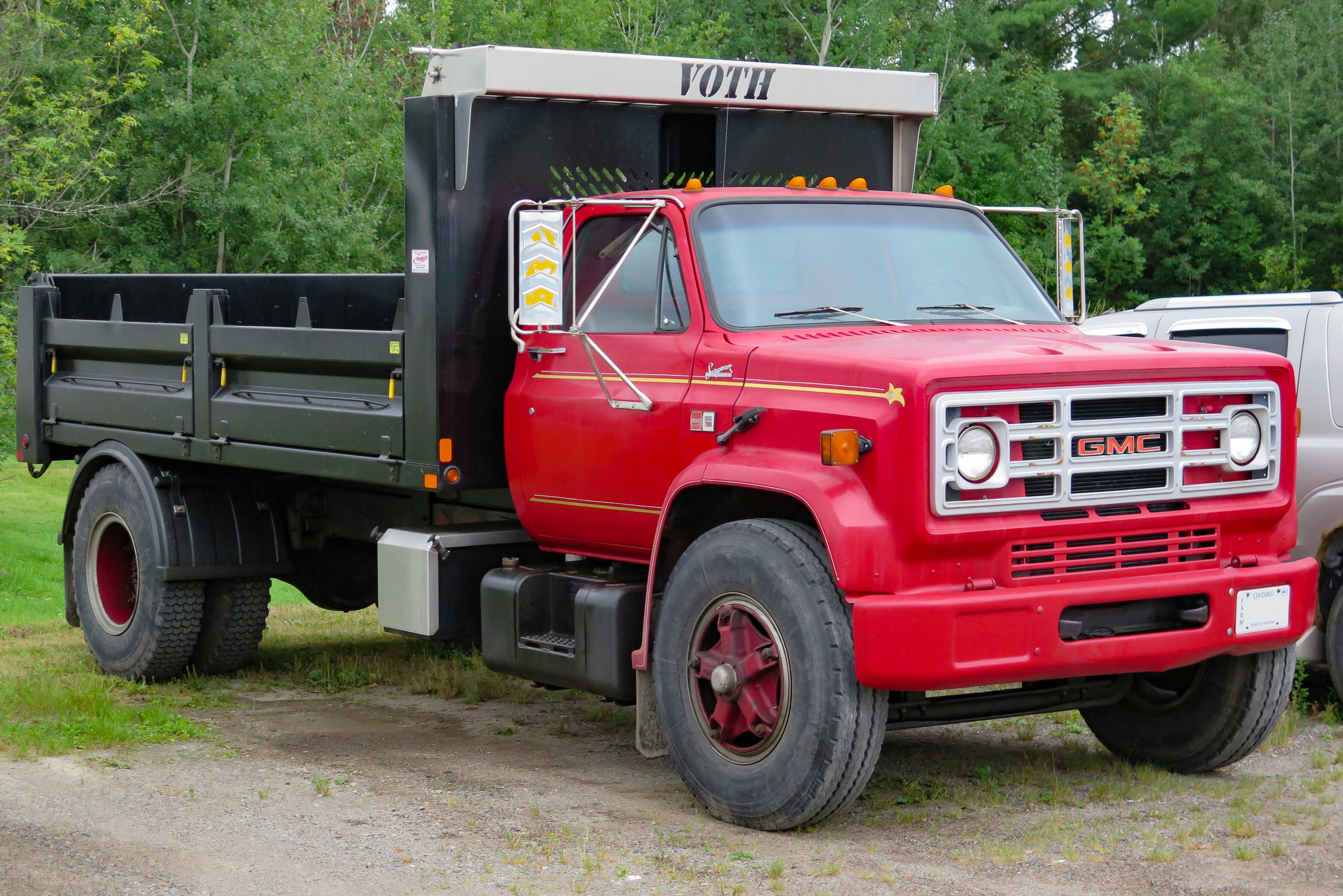
1986 GMC C7000 dump truck

For 1973, GM redesigned its medium-duty (Class 5–7) truck range for Chevrolet and GMC, slotted between 1-ton trucks and the Class 7–8 H/J and C/M heavy conventional trucks (designed by GMC). Designed by Chevrolet, the trucks mated the Rounded-Line cabs to a heavier-duty frame and a taller hood; with the exception of the steering column and gear shifter, the model lines shared much of their interior.

The gasoline engines that were offered in the medium-duty trucks were the Chevrolet 250 and 292 inline-sixes alongside the 350 small-block V8 and the 366, 427, and 454 big-block V8s. A very rare option was GMC's DH478 "ToroFlow" 478-cubic-inch diesel V6, which was offered only in 1973.

For 1980, diesel engines returned as an option with the introduction of Detroit Diesel's Fuel Pincher 8.2L V8. The Caterpillar 3208 10.4L V8 also became an option, as GM introduced the Chevrolet Kodiak/GMC TopKick. A short-hood conventional, the Kodiak/TopKick bridged the gap between the standard medium-duty line and the Class 7/8 Bruin/Brigadier conventional. To accommodate the larger Caterpillar engine, GM designed a taller, squared-off hood and larger grille (requiring the cab to be raised several inches upward).

During 1984 production, GM shifted the design of its cowled bus chassis from the previous-generation medium-duty truck (introduced in 1967) to the Rounded-Line C/K series; the model line was produced through 1991.

After 1990 production, GM replaced the Rounded-Line medium-duty C/K (including the Kodiak/TopKick) with a new GMT530 generation. Taking on the Kodiak/TopKick name, the GMT530 used the GMT400 cab.

=== Chevrolet Blazer/GMC Jimmy (1973–1991) ===
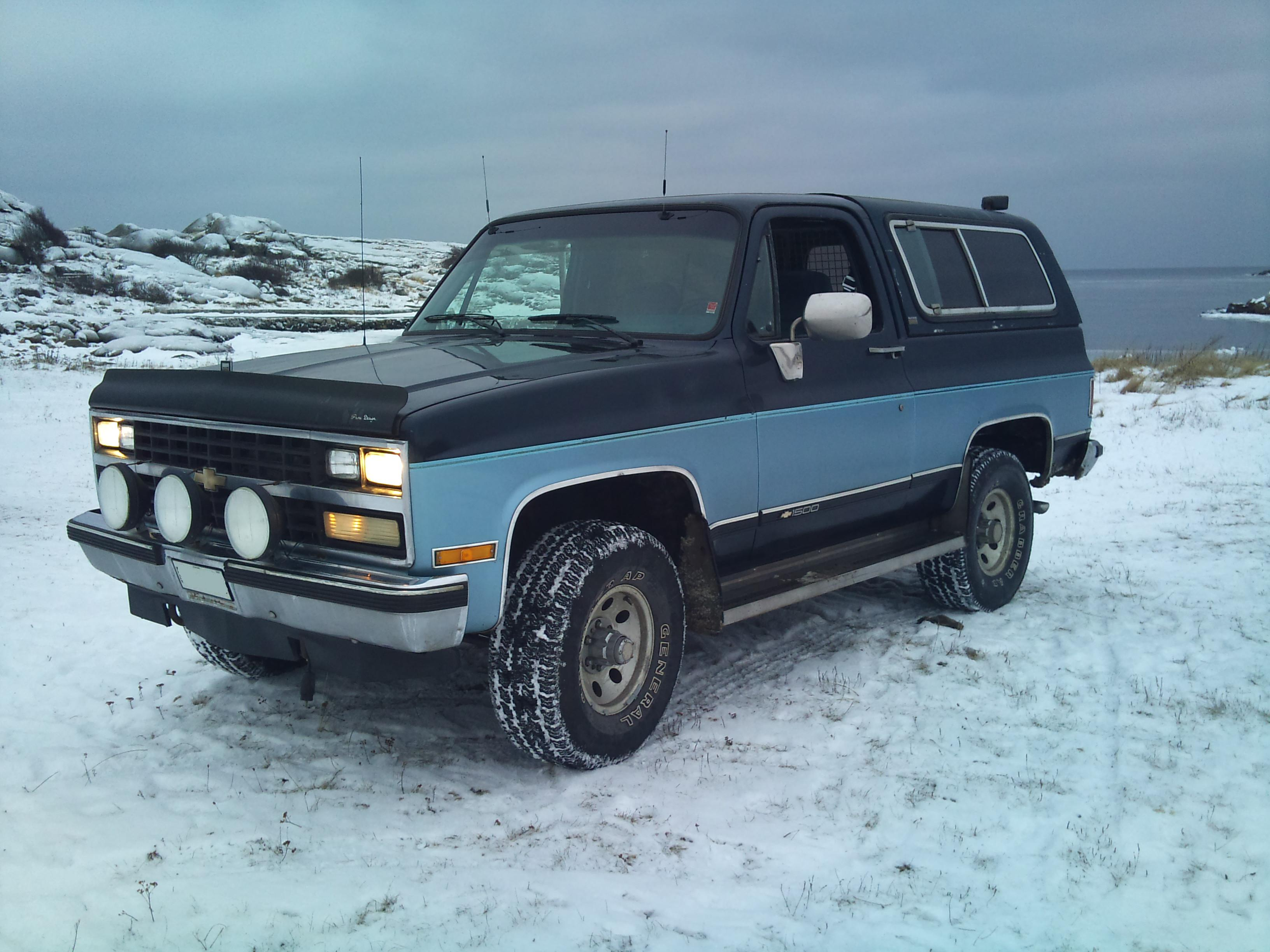
1989–1991 Chevrolet K5 Blazer V1500 6.2L

For 1973, GM introduced the second generation of the Chevrolet K5 Blazer and GMC Jimmy off-road vehicles (a precursor of the modern SUV) as part of the Rounded Line series. As with the previous generation, the Blazer/Jimmy were derived from a 1/2-ton pickup truck chassis under a shortened wheelbase. As a first, rear-wheel drive was offered as standard equipment (though most examples were equipped as K-series four-wheel drive vehicles). The popularity of the design commonality with pickup tricks led to the 1974 introduction of the Dodge Ramcharger (and Plymouth Trail Duster), along with the Jeep Cherokee; it would also lead to the 1978 redesign of the Ford Bronco (becoming a shortened variant of the F-150 4×4).

Along with sharing the yearly design changes as Fleetside (GMC Wideside) pickup trucks, the Blazer and Jimmy underwent a redesign of its roofline for 1976. The previous fully-open roof (offered with a lift-off hardtop or a convertible top) was replaced by a half-cab configuration with full doors and a fixed roof over front-seat passengers (along with improved rollover protection, the revision increased body commonality with the pickup trucks). The rear portion of the roof remained removable through 1991.

For 1982, GM reused the Blazer/Jimmy nameplates for its first compact SUVs. Both to distinguish the two model lines and to denote their pickup truck commonality, GM added a S10/S15 model prefix, as the K5 models were officially renamed the "Chevrolet Full-Size Blazer" and "GMC K-Jimmy." Following the 1987 transition to the R/V model nomenclature, the K-Jimmy became the "V-Jimmy".

For 1992, the full-size Blazer/Jimmy transitioned to the GMT400 architecture, with the V-Jimmy renamed as the GMC Yukon (the K5 Blazer later becoming the Chevrolet Tahoe); the model line received a fully-fixed roofline (effectively becoming a short-wheelbase version of the Suburban).

=== Chevrolet/GMC Suburban (1973–1991) ===
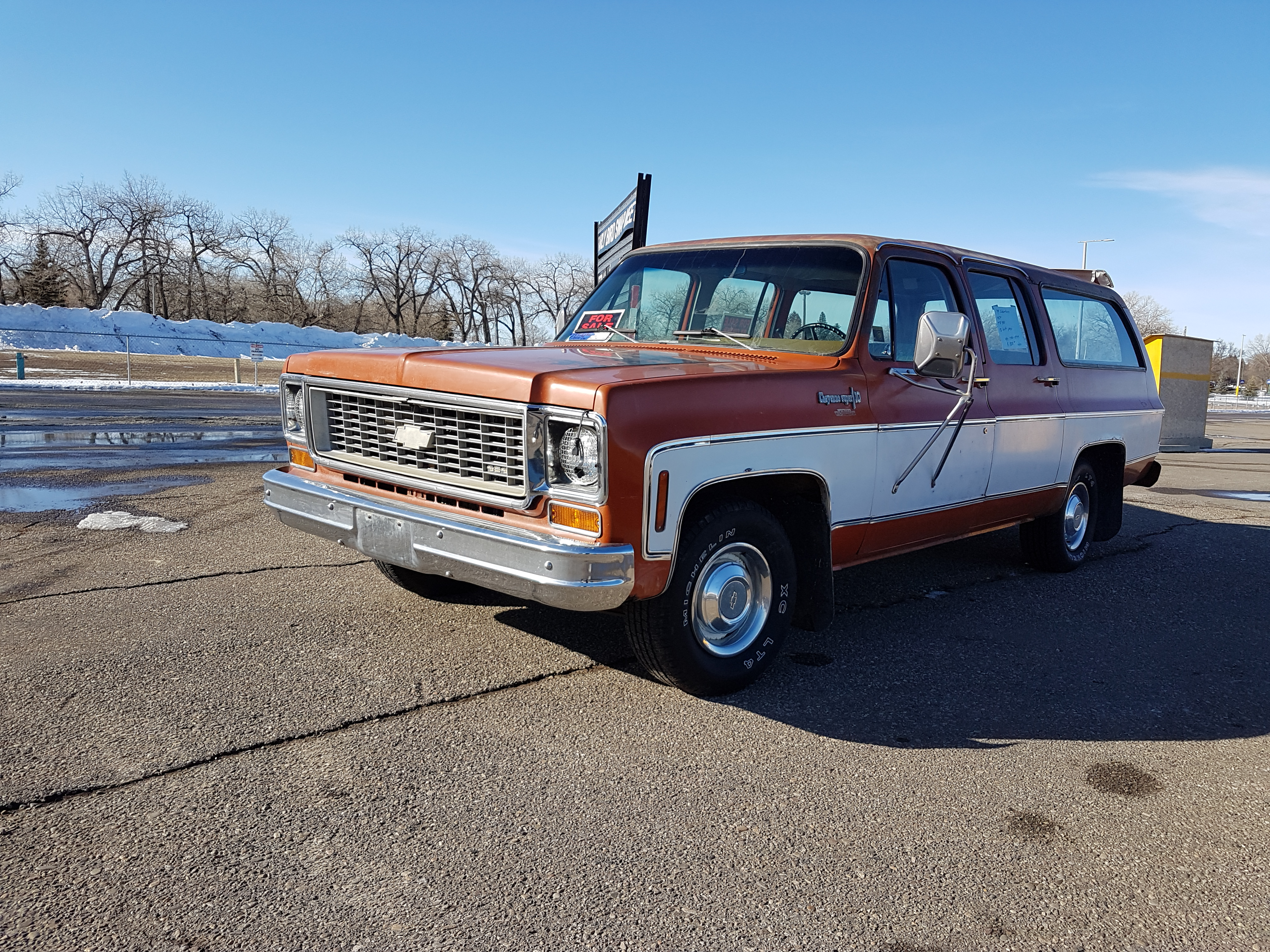
1974 Chevrolet Suburban C10 Cheyenne Super

The Rounded Line architecture became the basis of the seventh-generation Suburban. In contrast to the off-road oriented K5 Blazer, the Suburban was marketed as a truck-based station wagon. Sharing nearly its entire bodywork with the crew-cab pickups forward, the model line was offered with four sedan-style doors for the first time. In a marketing change, both Chevrolet and GMC divisions adopted the Suburban name for the model line; following the discontinuation of the similar International Travelall, the Chevrolet Suburban primarily competed against its GMC namesake in the marketplace.

Offered in both 1/2-ton and 3/4-ton payload series, the Suburban shared the same trim levels as its pickup-truck counterpart. While seating up to nine passengers, the Suburban was sized between intermediate-size station wagons (Chevelle/Malibu) and full-size wagons (Impala/Caprice) in length; in contrast to many car-based wagons, the model line offered a forward-facing third-row seat.

After becoming part of the R/V series in 1987, the Rounded-Line Suburban was produced through the 1991 model year.

== South American production ==
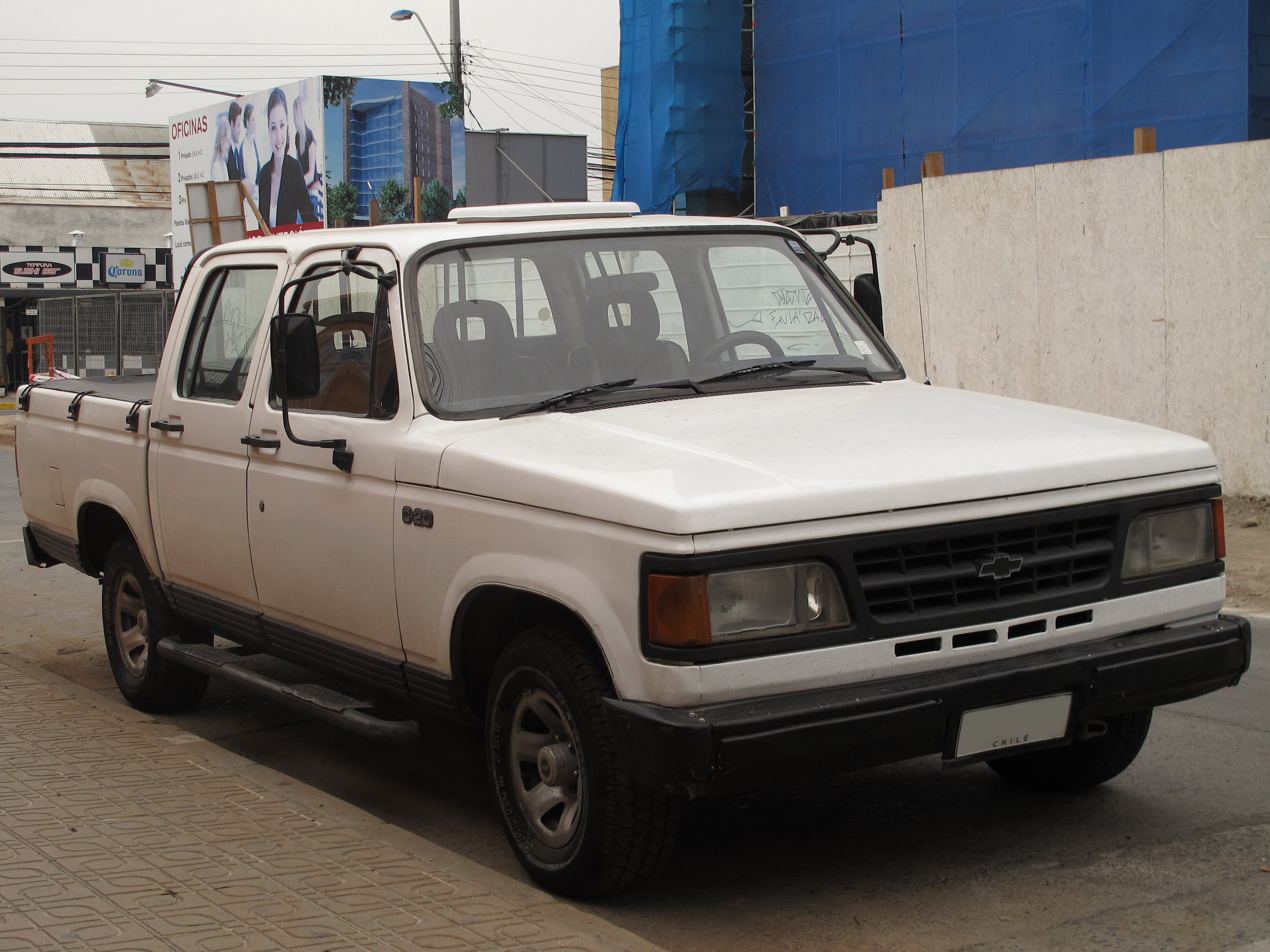
1993 Chevrolet C-20

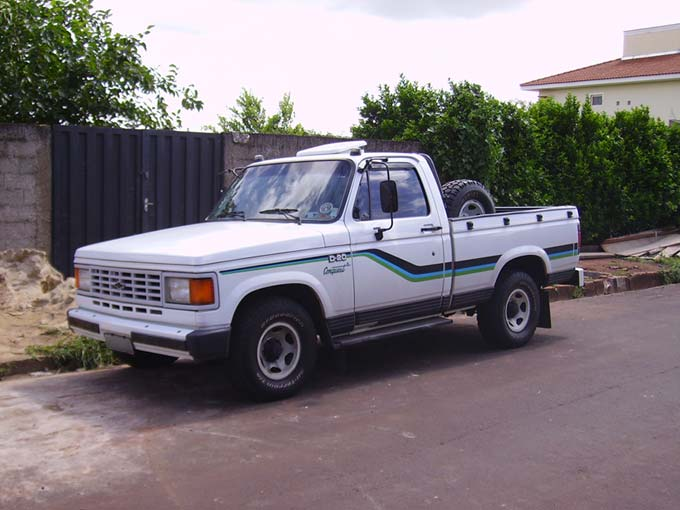
1992 Chevrolet D-20 Conquest

Sevel Argentina built the Chevrolet C10 in its Córdoba plant from late 1985 to 1991. The gasoline version used the Chevy 250 CID engine (4,093 cc) familiar to most Latin American markets, producing 130 hp (96 kW). As Sevel was a subsidiary of Peugeot, the C10 was also available with a 70 hp (51 kW), Indénor XD2 2,304 cc diesel engine; in the United States, the XD2 engine powered the Peugeot 504.

In Brazil, General Motors do Brasil produced the Rounded-Line series as the 10/20 series. Introduced in 1985, the model line replaced the locally produced C10 (derived from the first-generation 1964 C/K). The model line was marketed under three model series, designated by fuel (A=ethanol, C=gasoline, D=diesel). Sharing primarily its cab structure with its American counterpart, the 10/20 was produced with its own front fascia (sharing its headlights with the Chevrolet Opala). Shared with the Opala, a 135 hp (99 kW) 4.1-liter inline-six (discontinued in the United States for 1985) was used for gasoline and ethanol versions; an 87 hp (64 kW) 3.9-liter Perkins diesel inline-four was also offered. For 1986, a "double cab" was introduced, sharing the four-door crew cab of its North American counterpart. During the early 1990s, the 10/20 series underwent several mechanical updates and was produced by GM do Brasil through 1997, when it was replaced by the GMT400-derived Silverado produced in Argentina.

== Safety ==
As it entered production for 1973, the third-generation C/K-Series marked multiple safety advancements concerning full-size pickups. The model line was the first full-size pickup produced with a passenger-side sideview mirror as standard equipment. While in use in GM cars since 1967, the Rounded-Line pickups were the first full-size trucks produced with an energy-absorbing collapsible steering column.

For 1976, outboard seats received three-point (lap-and shoulder) safety belts with emergency locking retractors; a center lap safety belt was used, with slack adjustment. For 1977, Ford and Dodge would follow suit, adding the same seat belt design to their full-size trucks.

Other safety features included soft-padded interior panels for appearance and safety, 3,329 square inches of tempered and laminated safety glass, prismatic rearview mirror, six turn-signal indicator lamps with asymmetrical flash, four-way hazard function, and lane departure function.

=== Sidesaddle fuel tank controversy ===
During the development of the Rounded-Line generation of pickup trucks in the late 1960s, the fuel tank was relocated from inside the cab to the outboard side of the right frame rail (if an auxiliary fuel tank was specified, both frame rails). Commonly referred to as a sidesaddle configuration, the decision was largely made in the interest of reducing in-cab exposure to fuel vapors (and to carry more fuel). After the 1991 discontinuation of the model line, the design underwent both media and government scrutiny related to potential fire hazards of the configuration.

The successor fourth-generation 1988–2000 C/K pickup trucks were designed with a single fuel tank located between the frame rails; the model line was designed well before the sidesaddle fuel tank configuration received media controversy.

==== 1992 Dateline NBC report ====
On November 17, 1992, Dateline NBC aired an investigative report titled "Waiting to Explode". Coinciding with federal investigations into the model line, Dateline focused on allegations on the third-generation C/K trucks exploding in side-impact collisions due to the design of the fuel tanks. As a central part of the episode, Dateline showed sample footage of a low-speed accident in which the fuel tank exploded. In what would become a controversy of its own, the program did not disclose that the accident was staged to optimize an explosion.

During the 1992 report, a third-generation C/K caught fire in an 30 MPH side-impact test collision. Following subsequent investigation, the speed of the collision was found to be higher (approximately 40 MPH). After finding the charred wreckage of the tested GM pickups, GM investigators Failure Analysis Associates (FaAA, now Exponent) examined the fuel tanks of the vehicles; after X-ray examination, it was discovered that none of them had ruptured after collision. It was also found that to stage the explosion, NBC experts used model-rocket engines coupled with a leaking fuel cap to stage the explosion. After reviewing the video itself, smoke was found erupting underneath the truck a few frames before the collision; additionally, the subsequent fire lasted for only 15 seconds.

Regardless of any increased risk of fire, the GM trucks had safety records in side-impact crashes statistically indistinguishable from their Ford and Dodge counterparts. The sidesaddle fuel tanks themselves were found to have a robust design highly resistant to crushing or crumpling from a side impact. Trucks equipped with these tanks met and exceeded the requirements of Federal Motor Vehicle Safety Standard No. 301. Studies showed that it would take about 4,000 side-impact crashes with such a truck to get one with fire, major injury, or fatality.

On February 8, 1993, after announcing its anti-defamation/libel lawsuit against NBC, GM conducted a highly publicized point-by-point rebuttal in the Product Exhibit Hall of the General Motors Building in Detroit that lasted nearly two hours. On February 10, 1993, GM settled with NBC, resulting in multiple NBC personnel losing their jobs.

==== Government investigation ====
In April 1994, General Motors rejected a government request to issue a recall for all 1973–1987 C/K pickup trucks, claiming that it would involve over 6 million vehicles at a cost of over $1 billion. As of 2020, such a recall would have been the third-largest ever (in terms of size). On October 17, 1994, U.S. Transportation Secretary Federico F. Pena announced that a two-year investigation had found that the trucks posed a fire hazard; federal officials estimated that 150 persons may have died in preventable fiery crashes. In its investigation, the government found that the 1973–1987 C/K trucks were at least 2.5 times more likely to produce a fire-related fatality from a side-impact crash than a comparable Ford or Dodge pickup truck.

The gas tanks leaked in at least two crash tests performed by GM around the time the trucks were first sold in 1972. The federal report also stated that 50 MPH crash tests performed in the early 1980s "clearly demonstrated" the tanks were susceptible to puncturing.

As most recalls are issued by the manufacturer, government-issued recalls are fairly rare (only eight had been issued at the time of the investigation). In the 1980s, GM had blocked an effort in court for a recall over a suspected brake problem of the model line. In response, the government clarified that vehicles sold in the United States must meet the National Traffic and Motor Vehicle Safety Act; along with meeting safety standards at the time of production, their production is also required to allow them to operate them safely under real conditions.

GM also settled with the U.S. National Highway Traffic Safety Administration (NHTSA) in 1994 for the amount of $51 million to be used for safety programs. GM also offered owners $1,000 coupons toward the purchase of a new truck with a trade-in of the old one.

==== Class action lawsuits ====
In 1993, the negative publicity generated by the Dateline story spawned several class action lawsuits. In addition, GM was sued more than 100 times in lawsuits brought by individuals who were burned in GM trucks. Nearly all of those cases were settled out of court. In 1993, a Georgia jury awarded more than $105 million, including $101 million in punitive damages, to the parents of a 17-year-old named Shannon Moseley who burned to death. The verdict was later overturned by an appeals court and the case was settled before it could be re-tried.

Fatality figures vary wildly. A study by Failure Analysis Associates (now Exponent, Inc.) found 155 fatalities in these GM trucks between 1972 and 1989 involving both side impact and fire. The Center for Auto Safety, Ralph Nader's lobbying group, claims "over 1,800 fatalities" between 1973 and 2000 involving both side impact and fire.
