= Samson Tractor =

Defunct motor vehicle manufacturers of the United States

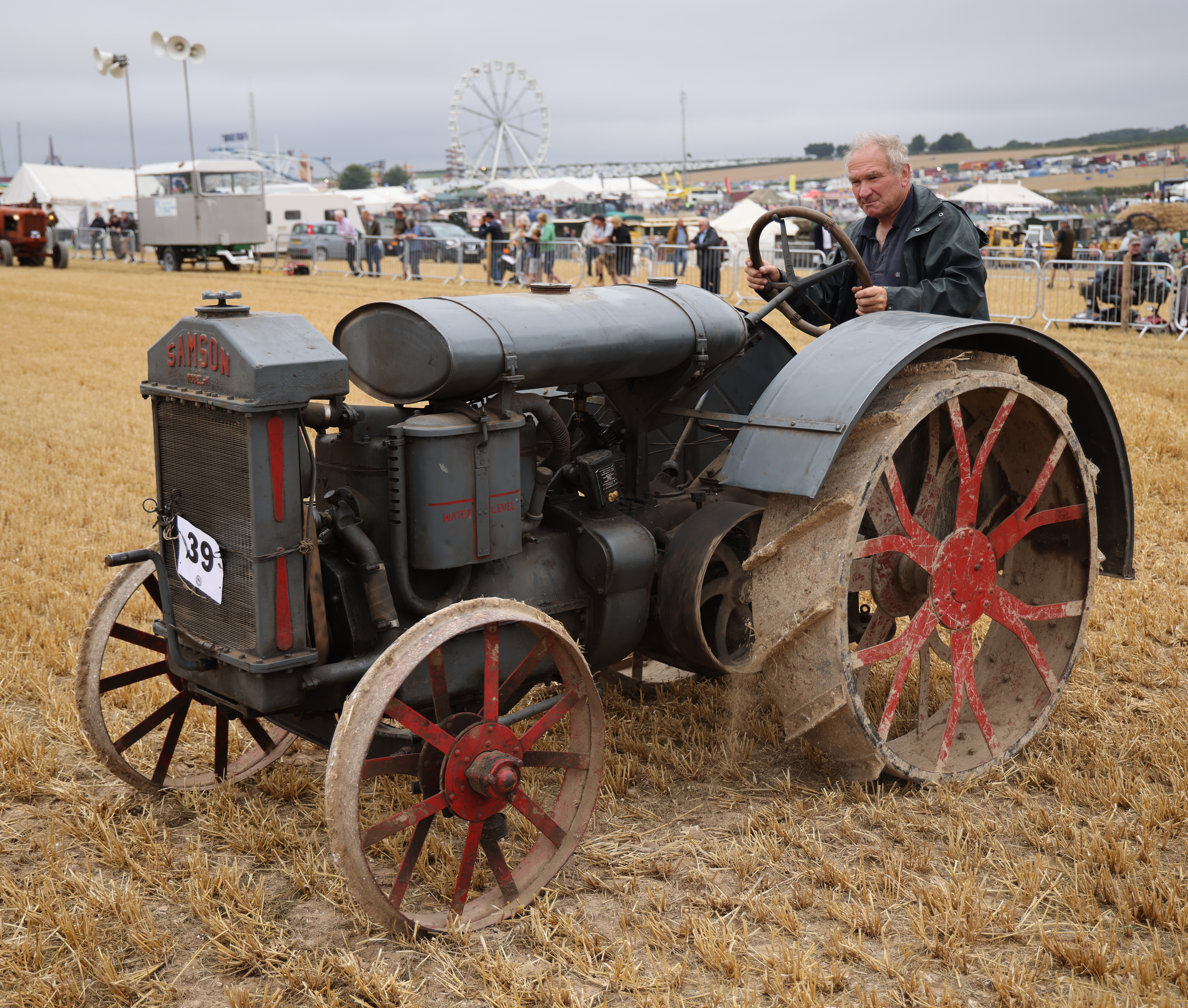
A 1920 Samson M Tractor

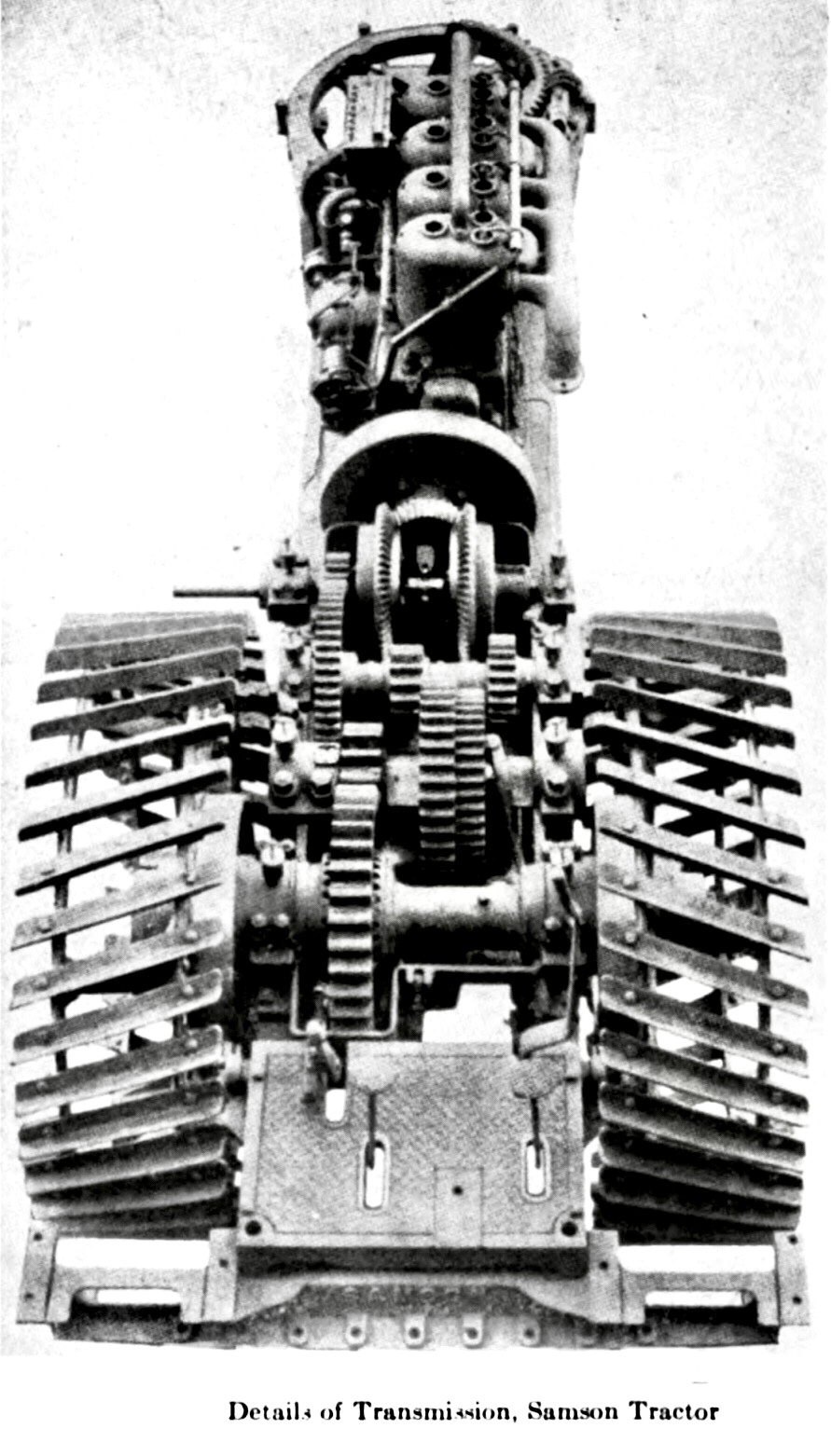
Samson Tractor (1915)

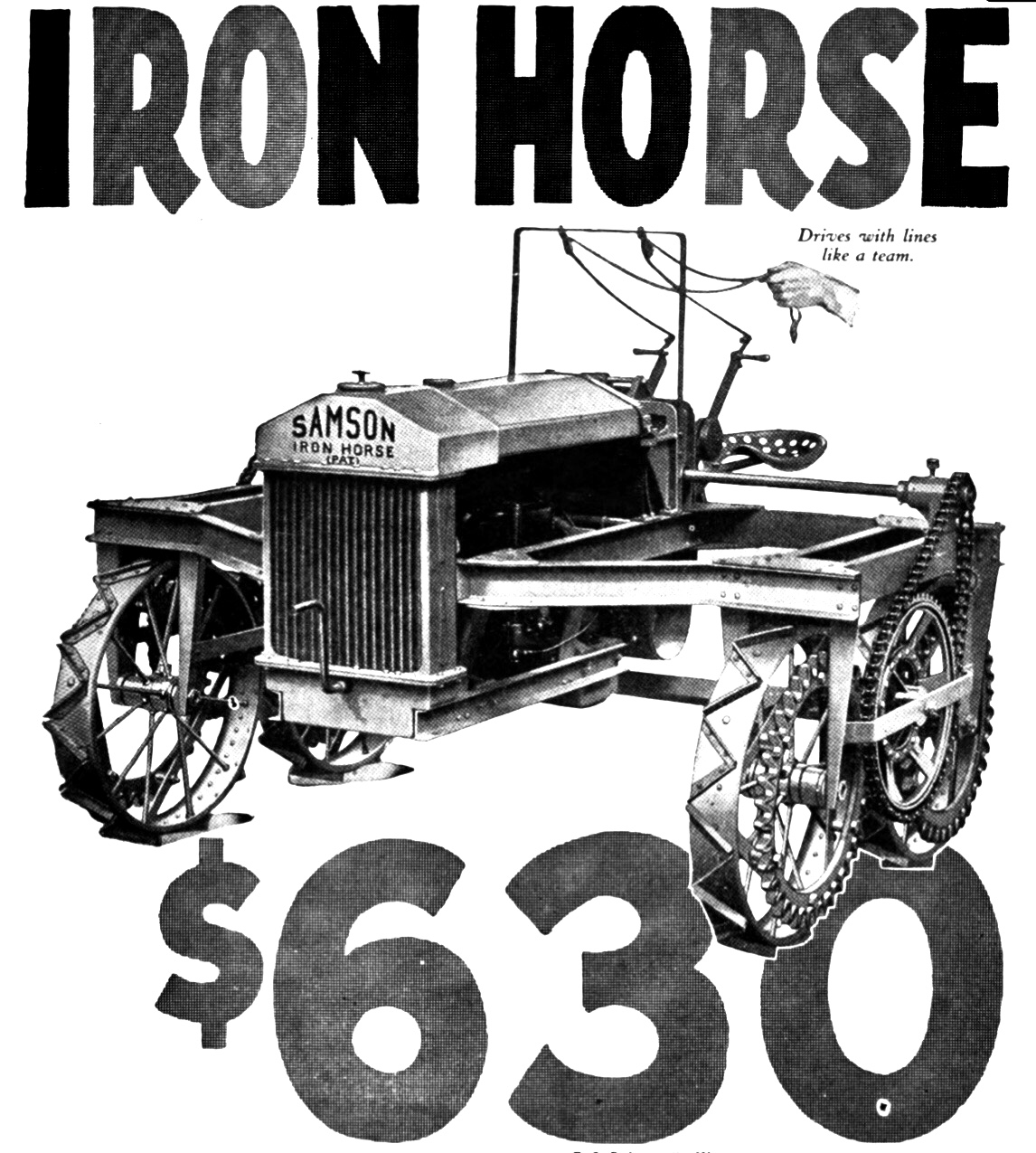
Samson Iron Horse

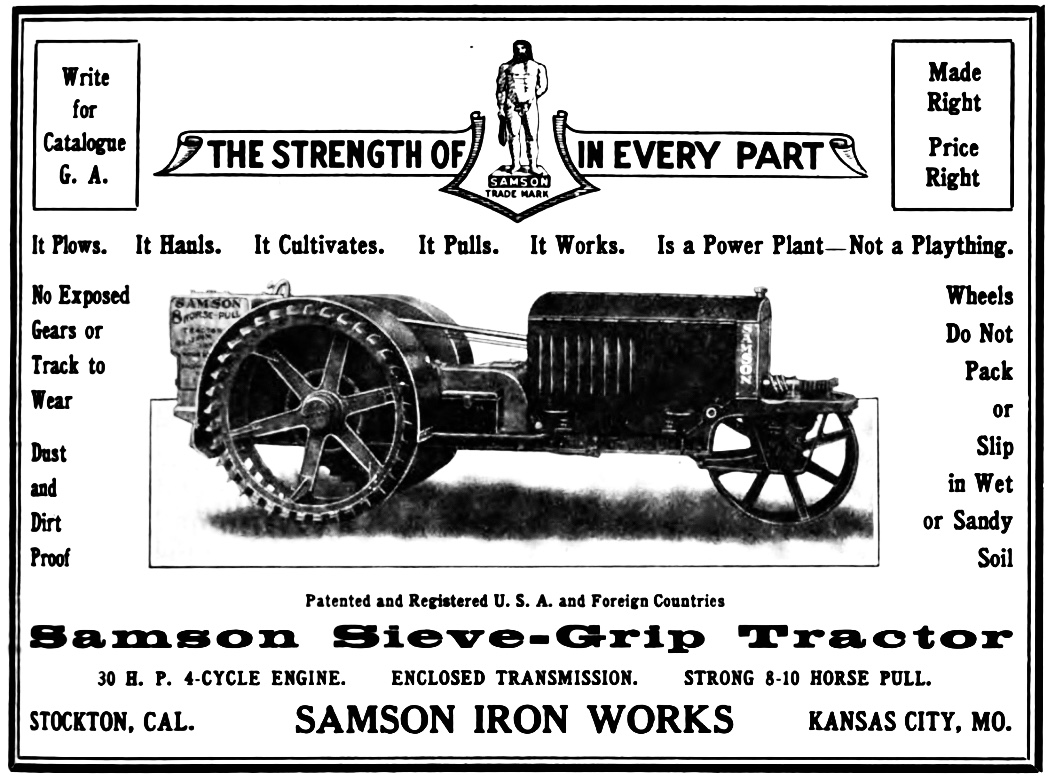
Samson Sieve Grip (1914)

Samson Tractor was an American brand of tractors 1900 to 1923, of trucks from 1920 to 1923, and a General Motors brand from 1917 to 1923.

== History ==
The Samson Iron Works were founded in Stockton, California and, after becoming known for building farm tractors, were renamed the Samson Tractor Company in 1916 and again the Samson Sieve-Grip Tractor Company in 1917. In the same year, GM, under the leadership of William C. Durant, purchased the company to enter the market for farm tractors and to emulate the success of Ford Motor Company's highly successful Fordson Model F tractor and others. In 1918, GM bought the Janesville Machine Company of Janesville, Wisconsin, another farm implement producer, for $1,000,000 and decided to concentrate production of both companies in Janesville. In 1919, GM decided to shut down operations in Stockton and run both companies as one operation, the Samson Tractor Company Division of General Motors in Janesville.

So, expectations at GM were high and they lasted mainly on the modern new Samson Model M tractor. Production of the new four wheel tractor started in May, 1919 at a rate of 10 units per day. It was a good machine and, at first, reasonably priced at $650. But that proved soon unprofitable. So, a rise to $840 followed, thus ending all plans to outsell the Fordson. In 1923, GM closed the Samson division.

== Selected Samson tractors ==
Mainstay of the company before the GM takeover was the "Sieve Grip" tractor, a large and heavy three-wheeled vehicle with a low slung chassis on which the engine was placed central between the single front and straked rear wheels. The tractor was available with several engine sizes.

- 1914 Samson Sieve Grip 6-12; 6/12 hp single-cylinder engine
- 1915 Samson Sieve Grip 10-25; 10/25 hp GMC engine
- Samson Sieve Grip 12-25; 12/25 hp
- Samson Sieve Grip Model 30X (GM)
- Samson Model S-25
- 1918 Samson Model M; 4 wheel unit frame design; GM
- Samson Model D, a.k.a. Samson Motor Cultivator; "Iron Horse" (attachable to implements, no seat, walk behind type)

== Trucks and a car ==
In addition to building tractors, Samson made trucks and attempted to produce an automobile as well. The Samson truck was built from 1920 to 1923 as a ¾ ton and a 1¼ ton model. It was powered by a Chevrolet 26 bhp engine that had been developed for the Chevrolet 490 passenger car. Success was limited, though.

Development for the passenger car started at about the same time. The car was intended as being "the first and only farm-designed car", meaning that it would meet the farmer's requirements better than the competition, and was named the "Whole Family Car", as it seated up to nine passengers. The conventional steel ladder frame had a wheelbase of 118 in. The rear bench seat and jump seats of this touring car were quickly removable, thus providing ample payload. Power was delivered by the Chevrolet FB four-cylinder engine, rated at 37 bhp. General Motors announced this new automobile in 1919 and planned to build 2,250 units in its first season and 5,000 for 1920. However, pnly one prototype was built, making the Samson the only car ever that GM announced but never produced.

In 1923, General Motors closed the unprofitable Samson division, transferring the Janesville assembly plant to Chevrolet division. Chevrolet and GMC trucks and SUVs continued to be built at that plant until December 2008, when GM closed the 89-year-old plant as part of its restructuring.
