= Apache (disambiguation) =

The Apache are a group of culturally related Native American tribes.

Apache, Apaches or The Apache may also refer to:

== Arts and entertainment ==
=== Film and television ===
- Apache (film), a 1954 western film starring Burt Lancaster
- The Apache (1925 film), a British silent drama film directed by and starring Adelqui Migliar
- The Apache (1928 film), an American silent mystery film directed by Phil Rosen
- L'apache, 1919 American silent film
- Apaches (film), a 1977 British public information film
- Apaches (TV series), a 2017 Spanish drama television series

=== Literature ===
- Apache (novel), by Will Levington Comfort, 1931
- Apaches, a 1997 novel by Lorenzo Carcaterra

=== Music and dance ===
- Apache (dance), a form of dance in the 1920s
- Apache (dance move) more commonly known as "Texas Tommy", a dance move used in Lindy Hop, West Coast Swing, and Salsa
- "Apache" (instrumental), a 1960 instrumental by Jerry Lordan, performed by the Shadows, and sampled in hip-hop
- Apache, an album by Link Wray, 1990

=== Other uses in arts and entertainment ===
- Apache (video game), a 1995 video game developed by Digital Integration
- Apache, a 1994 video game developed by Team17
- Les Apaches, a group of musicians, writers and artists which formed around 1900 in Paris, France
- Apache (rapper), an American rapper

== Biology ==
- Apache (planthopper), a genus of planthoppers in the family Derbidae
- Insara apache, the Apache bush katydid, an insect species
- Apache, a sweet potato cultivar
- Apache pine, a tree species found in northern Mexico
- Apache dwarf mistletoe, a parasitic plant
- APACHE II and III, severity-of-disease classification systems

== Businesses, organizations, technology, and licenses ==
- apache.be, a Belgian investigative news website
- Apache Corporation, an American oil and gas company
- Apache Group, dissenting faction of the 1990s Advanced Computing Environment
- Apache Pizza, an Irish pizza chain
- The Apache Software Foundation, an American non-profit corporation to support Apache software projects
  - Apache HTTP Server, a free and open-source cross-platform web server ("httpd")
  - Apache License, a permissive free software license

== Military ==
- Boeing AH-64 Apache, an American twin-turboshaft attack helicopter
  - AgustaWestland Apache, a version built for the British Army
- Apache (missile), an air-launched anti-runway cruise missile, manufactured by MBDA
- North American A-36 Apache, the ground-attack/dive bomber version of the P-51 Mustang
- USS Apache, the name of several ships of the U.S. Navy
- Wright XF3W Apache, a biplane of 1926 tested by U.S. Navy

== People ==
- Apache (rapper), Anthony Peaks (1964–2010), an American rapper
- Apache 207, a German rapper
- Apache (Viet Cong soldier), a sniper and platoon commander killed by Carlos Hathcock
- El Apache, nickname for Argentine footballer Carlos Tevez (born 1984)
- Lady Apache, a Mexican luchadora pro-wrestler
- Faby Apache, a Mexican luchadora pro-wrestler
- Apache May Slaughter (1895–1900), an Old West celebrity
- Apache Ness (born 1971), Panamanian musician
- Apache Indian (musician), Steven Kapur (born 1967), a British singer-songwriter and DJ
- "Apache", a nickname given to Yves Trudeau (biker)

== Places ==
- Apaches (Puerto Vallarta), Jalisco, Mexico; an LGBT bar

=== In the United States ===
- Apache, Oklahoma; a town
- Apache, Arizona; a ghost town
- Apache County, Arizona; a county
  - Apache County School District No. 27
- Apache Peak, Colorado; a mountain

== Sports and mascots ==
- Apache Club de Mitsamiouli, a soccer club in Mitsamiouli, Comoros
- Laredo Apaches, a defunct baseball team in Laredo, Texas, United States
- Tokyo Apache, a Japanese basketball team
- Apache, the mascot of Arcadia High School (California)

== Transportation ==
- Chevrolet Apache, a light truck
- North Wing Apache, an ultralight aircraft
- Piper PA-23, named Apache, a light aircraft
- TVS Apache, a motorcycle
- Apache (train), a passenger train of the Southern Pacific and Rock Island railroads

== Other uses ==
- Apaches (subculture), a Parisian Belle Époque violent criminal underworld subculture
  - Apache revolver, a handgun
- Apache Group (geology), a Mesoproterozoic group of geologic formations in the southwestern United States
- HTC Apache, a mobile device

== See also ==
- Fort Apache (disambiguation)
- The Apache Kid (disambiguation)
- Southern Athabaskan languages, or Apachean, languages spoken by various groups of Apache and Navajo peoples
- Apashe (born 1992), Belgian-born Canadian franco-musician
