= Apache Peak (disambiguation) =

Apache Peak may refer to:

- Apache Peak, Colorado, USA; a mountain
- Apache Peak (Whetstone Mountains), Conchise County, Arizona, USA; a mountain, the highest peak in the Whetstone Mountains
- Apache Peak (White Mountains), Apache County, Arizona, USA; a mountain, the tallest peak of Sunrise Park Resort, in the White Mountains on the Colorado Plateau

== See also ==
- Apache (disambiguation)
- Peak (disambiguation)
