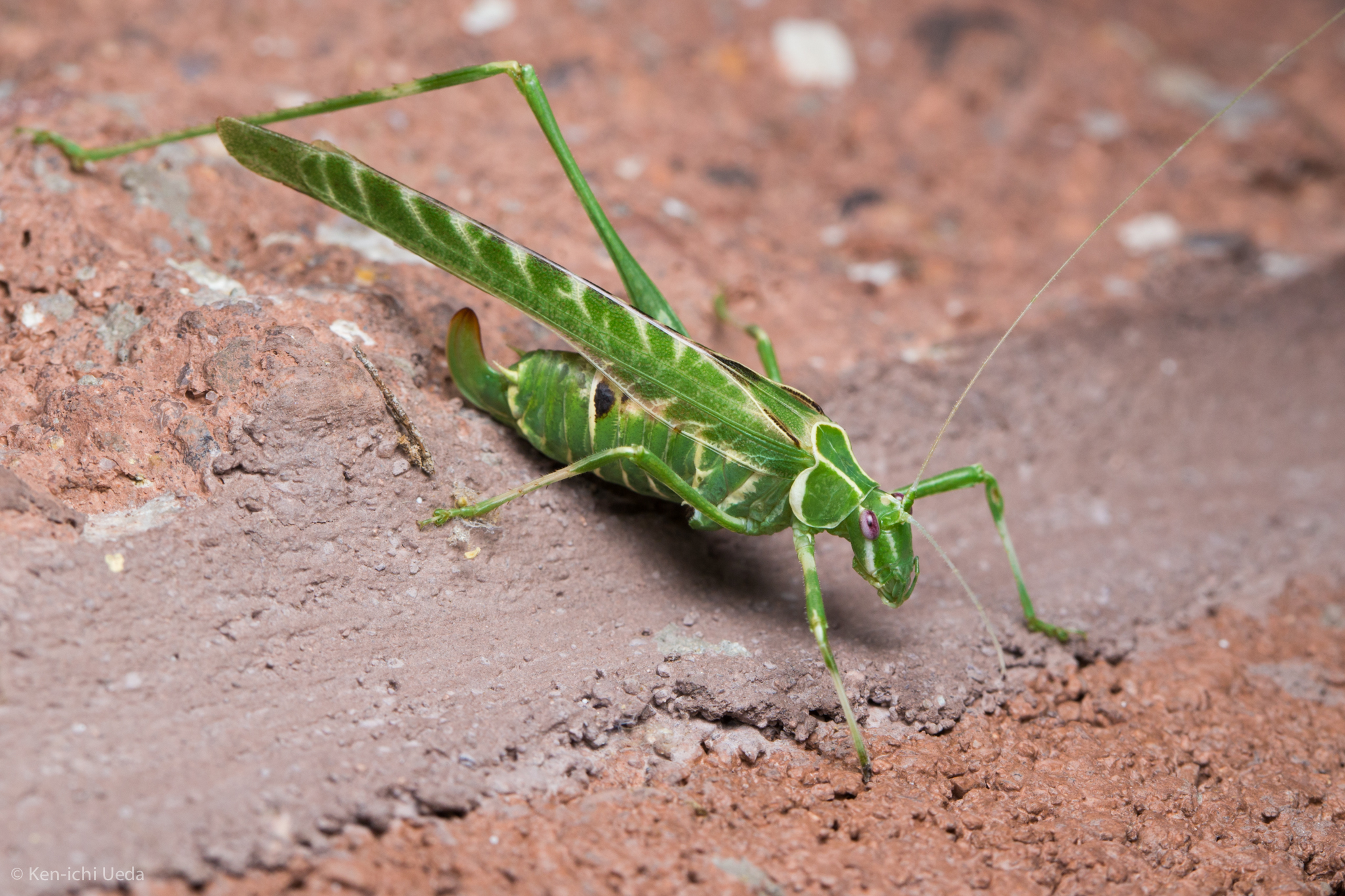
- Adult Insara elegans

Scientific classification
- Domain: Eukaryota
- Kingdom: Animalia
- Phylum: Arthropoda
- Class: Insecta
- Order: Orthoptera
- Suborder: Ensifera
- Family: Tettigoniidae
- Subfamily: Phaneropterinae
- Genus: Insara
- Species: I. elegans

Binomial name
- Insara elegans (Scudder, 1901)

= Insara elegans =

Species of cricket-like animal

Insara elegans, the elegant bush katydid, is a species of phaneropterine katydid in the family Tettigoniidae. It is found in North America.

== Subspecies ==
- Insara elegans consuetipes (Scudder, 1900)
- Insara elegans elegans (Scudder, 1901)
