= Apache Kid (disambiguation) =

Apache Kid (c. 1860 – c. 1894) is a historical Native American.

Apache Kid may also refer to:

- Apache Kid (comics), a fictional character from Marvel Comics named after the historical Native American
- Apache Kid Wilderness, a natural forest area in New Mexico similarly named after the historical Native American
- The Apache Kid (1930 film), a Krazy Kat cartoon
- The Apache Kid (1941 film), an American Western film

== See also ==
- Apache (disambiguation)
- Kid (disambiguation)
