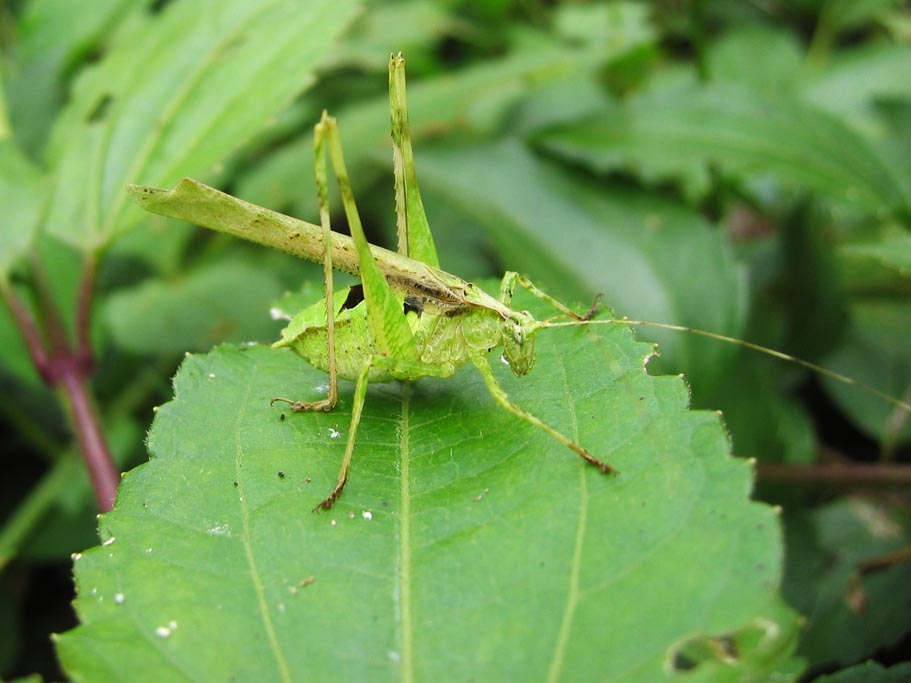
- Insara bolivari

Scientific classification
- Kingdom: Animalia
- Phylum: Arthropoda
- Class: Insecta
- Order: Orthoptera
- Suborder: Ensifera
- Family: Tettigoniidae
- Subfamily: Phaneropterinae
- Tribe: Insarini
- Genus: Insara; Walker, 1869

Synonyms
- Hormilia Stål, 1873

= Insara =

Genus of cricket-like animals

Insara, commonly known as western bush katydids, is a genus of katydids in the family Tettigoniidae.

== Species ==
The following species are recognised in the genus Insara:

- Insara abbreviata (Brunner von Wattenwyl, 1878)
- Insara acutitegmina Fontana, Buzzetti, Mariño-Pérez & García García, 2011
- Insara apache (Rehn, 1907) - Apache bush katydid
- Insara bolivari (Griffini, 1896)
- Insara covilleae Rehn & Hebard, 1914 - creosote bush katydid
- Insara elegans (Scudder, 1901) - elegant bush katydid
- Insara fasciata (Brunner von Wattenwyl, 1878) - gemmate bush katydid
- Insara gemmicula Rehn & Hebard, 1914
- Insara gracillima (Brunner von Wattenwyl, 1878)
- Insara intermedia (Brunner von Wattenwyl, 1878)
- Insara juniperi Hebard, 1935 - juniper bush katydid
- Insara lamellata Rehn & Hebard, 1914
- Insara oaxacae Fontana, Buzzetti, Mariño-Pérez & García García, 2011
- Insara phthisica (Saussure & Pictet, 1897)
- Insara prasina (Saussure & Pictet, 1897)
- Insara psaronota Hebard, 1923
- Insara sinaloae Hebard, 1925
- Insara tessellata Hebard, 1935 - tessellate bush katydid
- Insara tolteca Hebard, 1935
