= Insara juniperi =

Scientific classification
- Domain: Eukaryota
- Kingdom: Animalia
- Phylum: Arthropoda
- Class: Insecta
- Order: Orthoptera
- Suborder: Ensifera
- Family: Tettigoniidae
- Subfamily: Phaneropterinae
- Tribe: Insarini
- Genus: Insara
- Species: I. juniperi

Binomial name
- Insara juniperi Hebard, 1935

Species of cricket-like animal

Insara juniperi, the juniper bush katydid, is a species of phaneropterine katydid in the family Tettigoniidae. It is found in North America.
