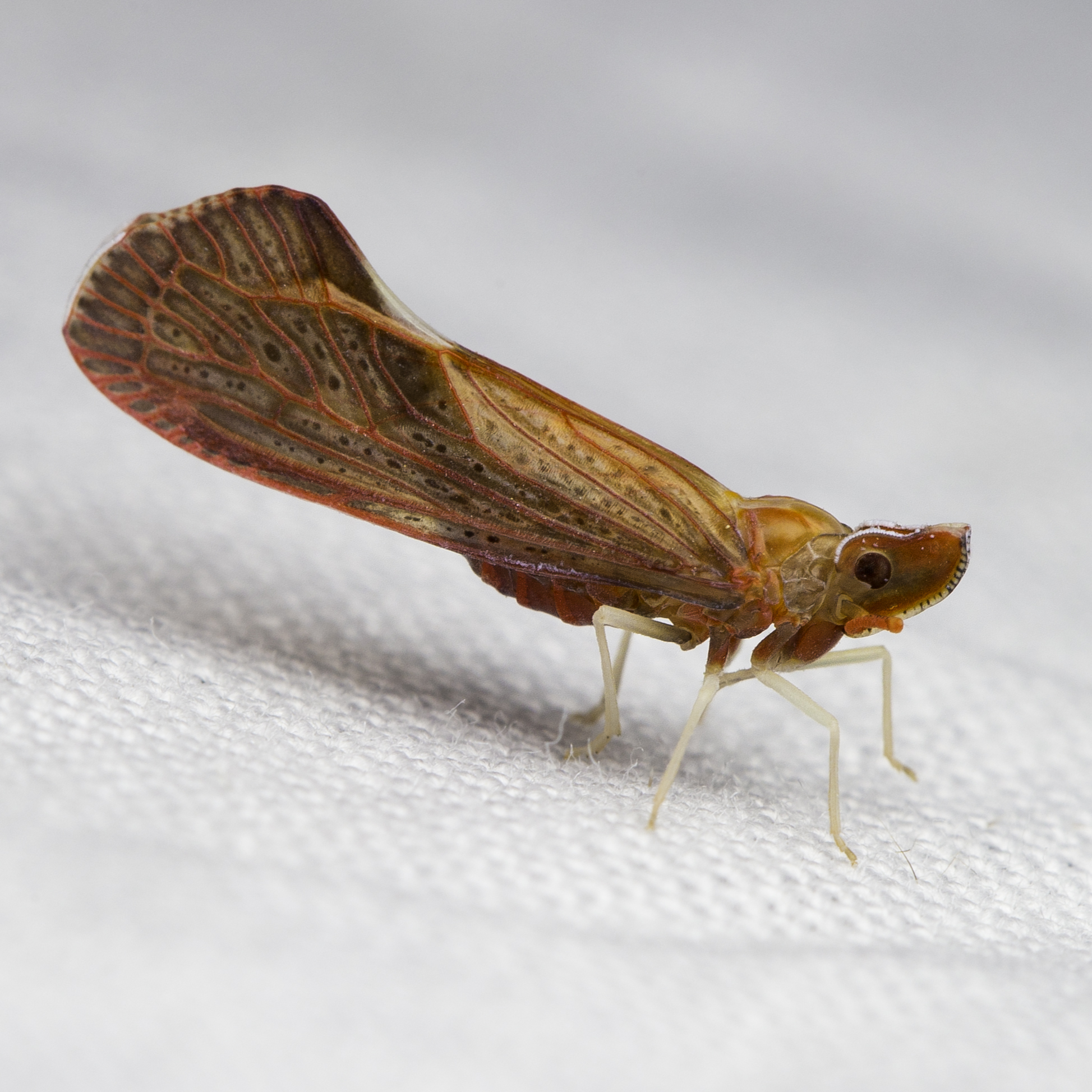

Scientific classification
- Domain: Eukaryota
- Kingdom: Animalia
- Phylum: Arthropoda
- Class: Insecta
- Order: Hemiptera
- Suborder: Auchenorrhyncha
- Infraorder: Fulgoromorpha
- Family: Derbidae
- Genus: Apache
- Species: A. californicum

Binomial name
- Apache californicum Wilkey, 1963

= Apache californicum =

Species of true bug

Apache californicum is a small, red planthopper that is endemic to California. The species is quite similar to Apache degeerii, which is present elsewhere in the United States and Canada, but males can be distinguished based on their genitalia. A. californicum has two pairs of hooks at the base of the flagellum, while A. degeerii only has a single pair.
