= Insara gemmicula =

Scientific classification
- Domain: Eukaryota
- Kingdom: Animalia
- Phylum: Arthropoda
- Class: Insecta
- Order: Orthoptera
- Suborder: Ensifera
- Family: Tettigoniidae
- Subfamily: Phaneropterinae
- Tribe: Insarini
- Genus: Insara
- Species: I. gemmicula

Binomial name
- Insara gemmicula Rehn & Hebard, 1914

Species of cricket-like animal

Insara gemmicula, the gemmate bush katydid, is a species of phaneropterine katydid in the family Tettigoniidae. It is found in North America.
