= Insara apache =

Scientific classification
- Domain: Eukaryota
- Kingdom: Animalia
- Phylum: Arthropoda
- Class: Insecta
- Order: Orthoptera
- Suborder: Ensifera
- Family: Tettigoniidae
- Subfamily: Phaneropterinae
- Tribe: Insarini
- Genus: Insara
- Species: I. apache

Binomial name
- Insara apache (Rehn, 1907)

Species of cricket-like animal

Insara apache, the Apache bush katydid, is a species of phaneropterine katydid in the family Tettigoniidae. It is found in North America.
