= Chevrolet Task Force =

American truck series

Chevrolet Task Force Series
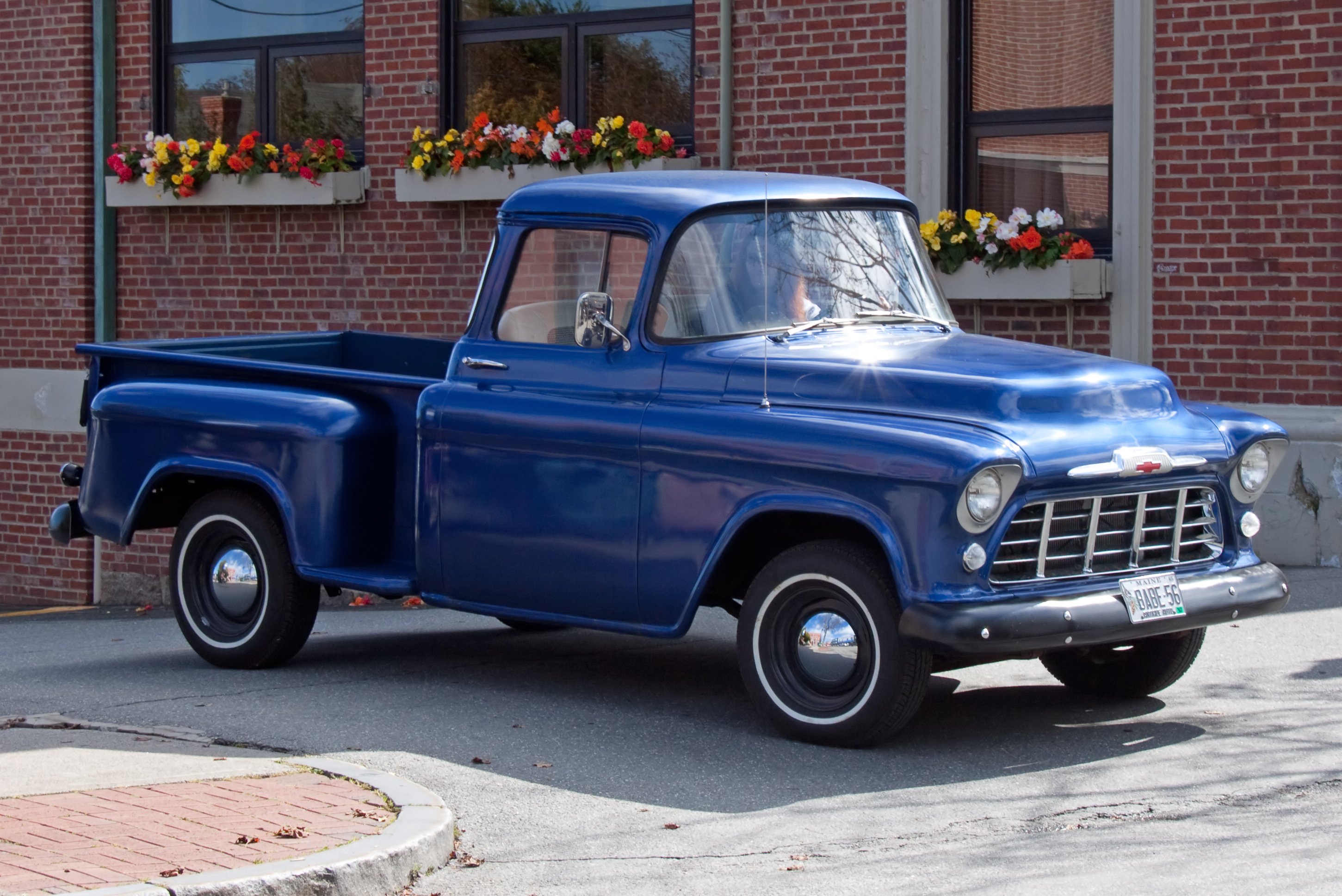
- 1956 Chevrolet Task Force (3100)

Overview
- Manufacturer: Chevrolet (General Motors)
- Also called: Task-Force; Apache; Cameo/Cameo Carrier; Viking (medium-duty); Spartan (heavy-duty); GMC Blue Chip Series
- Production: 1955–1959
- Assembly: Main Chevrolet plant: Flint Truck Assembly, (Flint, Michigan); Branch assembly: Baltimore Assembly, (Baltimore, Maryland); Janesville, Wisconsin (Janesville Assembly); Lakewood Assembly, Lakewood Heights (Atlanta, Georgia); Leeds Assembly, Leeds (Kansas City, Missouri); Norwood Assembly (Norwood, Ohio); Oakland, California (Oakland Assembly: Chevrolet and GMC); Pontiac West Assembly (Pontiac, Michigan: GMC only); St. Louis Truck Assembly, (St. Louis, Missouri); North Tarrytown Assembly (North Tarrytown, New York); Van Nuys Assembly (Van Nuys, California); Canada: Oshawa Truck Assembly (Oshawa, Ontario); Argentina: Buenos Aires (GM Argentina); Brazil: São Caetano do Sul (GM do Brasil)

Body and chassis
- Class: Pickup truck, commercial truck
- Body style: 2-door truck
- Layout: Front engine, rear-wheel drive / four-wheel drive
- Platform: GM A platform
- Related: Chevrolet Suburban

Powertrain
- Engine: 235 cu in (3.9 L) Thriftmaster I6; 261 cu in (4.3 L) Jobmaster I6; 265 cu in (4.3 L) Taskmaster V8; 283 cu in (4.6 L) Taskmaster V8; 322 cu in (5.3 L) Loadmaster V8; 348 cu in (5.7 L) Loadmaster V8
- Transmission: 2-speed Powerglide automatic; 3-speed manual; 4-speed manual; 4-speed Hydra-Matic automatic

Dimensions
- Wheelbase: 114.0 in (2,896 mm); 123.0 in (3,124 mm); 172.0 in (4,369 mm)

Chronology
- Predecessor: Chevrolet Advance Design
- Successor: C/K Series

The Chevrolet Task Force (or in some cases, Task-Force) is a light-duty (3100-short bed & 3200-long bed) and medium-duty (3600) truck series by Chevrolet introduced in 1955, its first major redesign since 1947. Known as the Blue Chip in the parallel GMC it had more modern design than the preceding Advance Design without sacrificing ruggedness or durability.

First available on March 25, 1955, these trucks were sold with various minor changes over the years from 1955 (2nd series) until 1957. Model years 1955 and 1956 had the "egg crate grille". 1955 had the emblems below the lateral line of the front fender, whereas in 1956, the emblem was located above the lateral line and the hood emblem was a bit higher on the hood. In 1957, the grille changed to a more open design and the hood was given "spears" resembling the Bel Air.

In 1958 the series was renamed "Apache", found on fender emblems, given a second set of headlights, and received other minor changes. The model continued with minor changes through 1959.

In 1960 the truck was replaced by the new C/K Series, but this retained the Apache name for some years.

== History ==
GM redesigned their truck line for the second half of 1955, but sold both designs that year; the previous design became known as the 1st Series, and the all-new design as the 2nd Series 1955. Commercial trucks and various other heavy duty models were also available. Chevrolet and GMC named their new series independently.

Manufacturer	1947–1955 (1st Series)	1955–1959 (2nd Series)
Chevrolet	"Advance Design"	"Task Force"
GMC	"New Design"	"Blue Chip" (short for "Blue Chip Money Makers")

The trucks were differentiated by running gear and interiors; Chevrolet used Chevrolet engines, and GMC used GMC inline-sixes and Pontiac V8s (Oldsmobile V8s for heavy-duty trucks).

For the first time in GM history, trucks were available with optional power steering, power brakes, and V8s. A column-shifted 3-speed manual transmission was standard, with an optional floor-shift 4-speed manual or Hydramatic automatic. The electrical system was upgraded from 6 to 12 volts.

The new body featured the truck industry's first wrap-around windshield, and an optional wrap-around rear window for Deluxe cab models. Headlights became integrated into the fenders. The cab is taller in size, and in-cab steps replaced the running boards of previous models. A "step" between the cab and rear fender aided access to items inside the pickup bed. Redesigned bed fenders were carried through the next generation body that ended in 1966.

== Differences ==
The initial model of the Task Force body style was introduced midway through the 1955 model year as the 1955 second series. Fenders have single headlights and a one-piece emblem is mounted below horizontal line on fender. Beds are 6.5 ft (2.0 m) and 7.5 ft (2.3 m); 1955 was the only year for the mid-length 7-foot bed. The GMC inline-6 retained a 6-volt electrical system for 1955 only.

For 1956, the Task Force received a wider hood emblem, with two-piece fender emblems mounted above the horizontal fender line. Last year for the eggcrate grille.

1957 was the only year for more open grille. Hood is flatter with two spears on top, similar to the 1957 Bel Air. Fender emblems are still above fender line, but are now oval-shaped, as opposed to previous versions in script.

From 1958 all light-duty trucks were called "Apache", medium-duty trucks called "Viking", and heavy-duty trucks called "Spartan". First year for factory-equipped air conditioning. Significant redesign of front end, featuring a shorter/full-width grille, four headlights instead of the previous two, and Parking lights are now in the grille instead of being in the front of the fender. The hood is similar to 1955/1956 models, but with a flat "valley" in the middle. A new "styleside" all-steel bed replaces the Cameo/Suburban versions; called "Fleetside" by Chevrolet and "Wideside" by GMC, available in 6.5 ft (2.0 m) and 8 ft (2.4 m) lengths. For 1958, GM was promoting their fiftieth year of production, and introduced Anniversary models for each brand (Cadillac, Buick, Oldsmobile, Pontiac, and Chevrolet); the trucks also received similar attention to appearance, but staying essentially durable, with minimal adornment.

1959 was the last model year for the series, showing minimal changes from 1958. Most apparent was a larger and more ornate hood emblem and redesigned badging on the fenders. This was the last year that the NAPCO (Northwestern Auto Parts Company) "Powr-Pak" four-wheel drive conversion could be factory ordered. The Apache name carried over into the next generation through 1961.

== Gallery ==
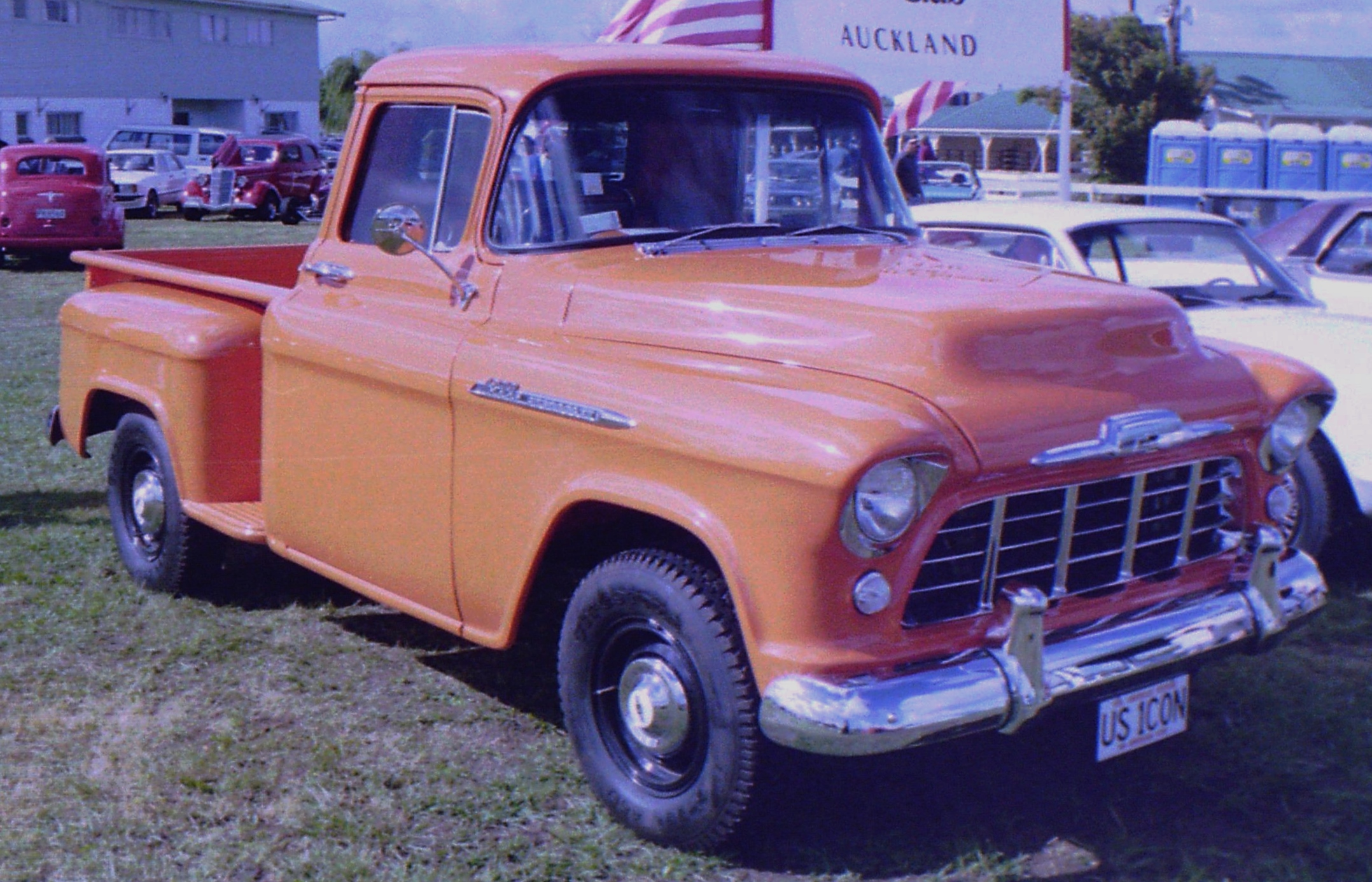
1955 Chevrolet Task Force

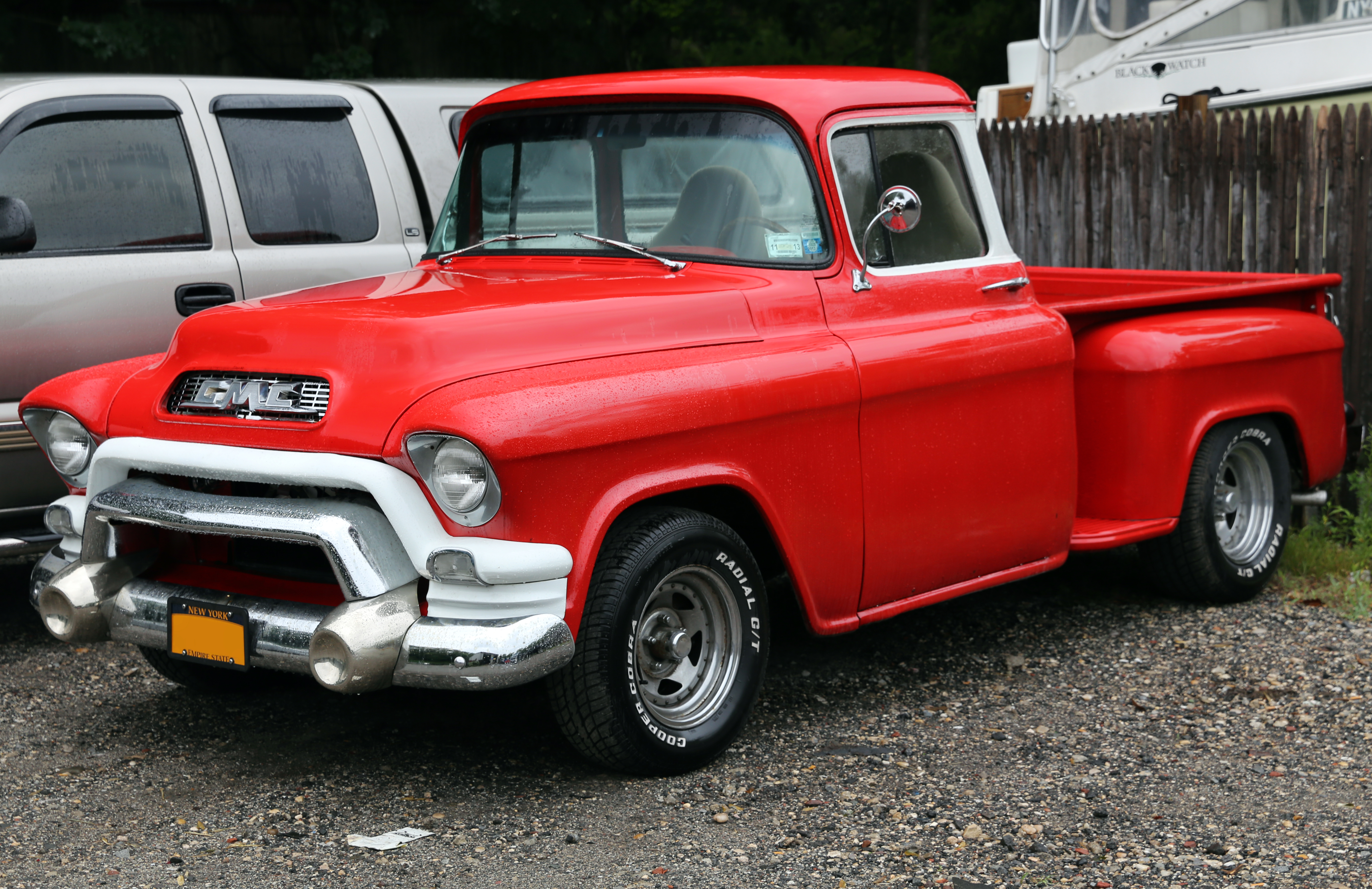
1955 GMC Blue Chip 150

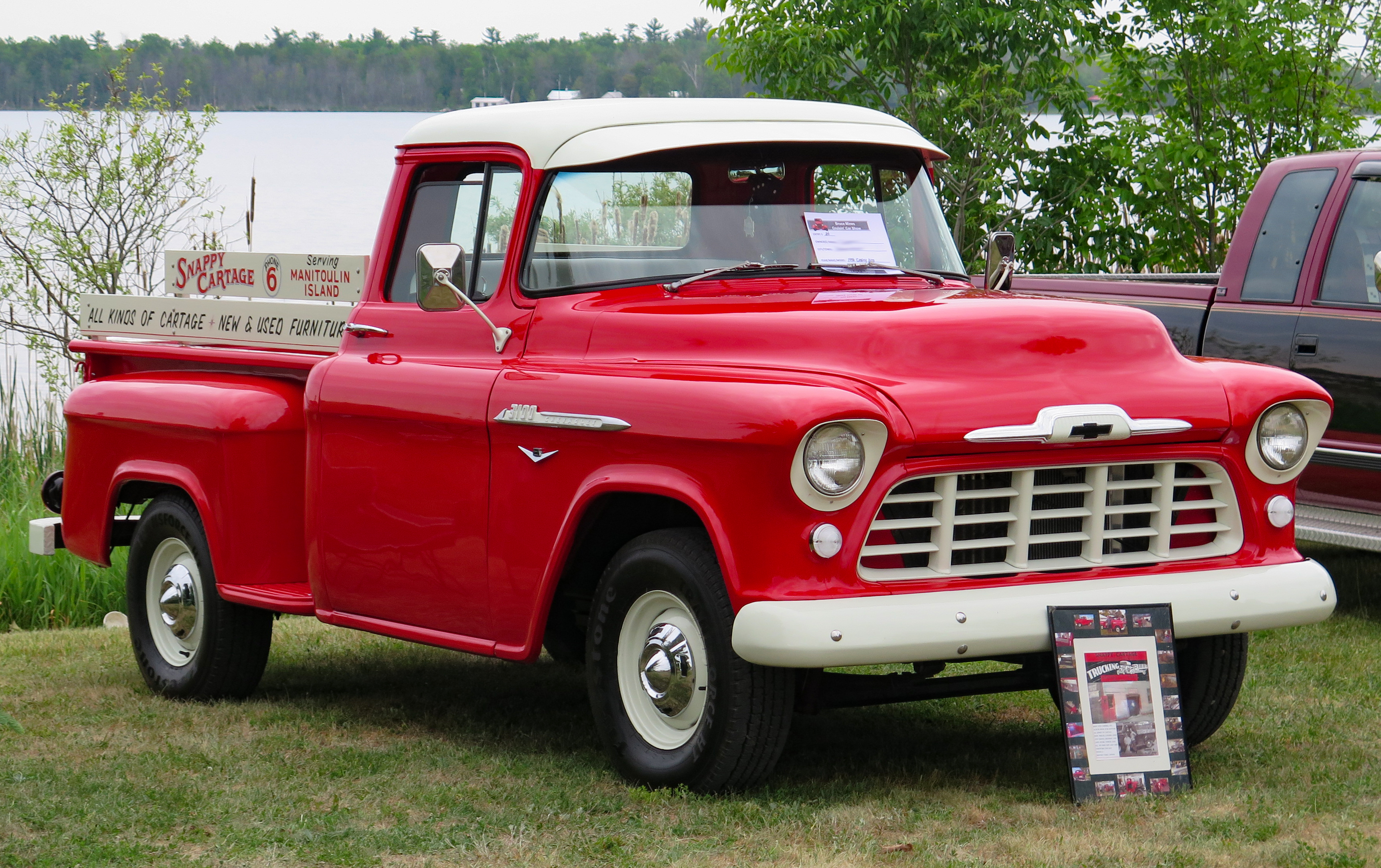
1956 Chevrolet 3100

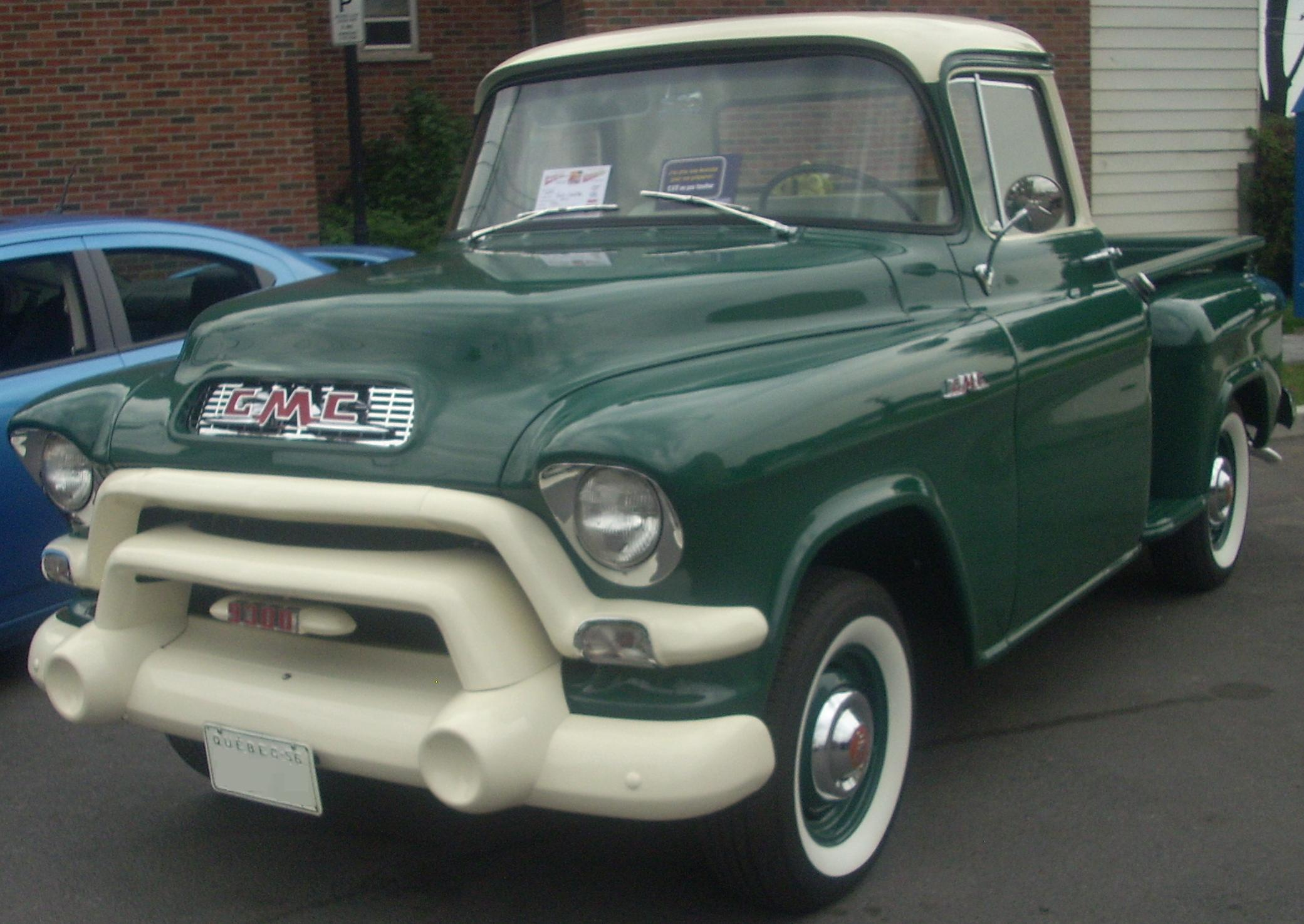
1956 GMC Blue Chip

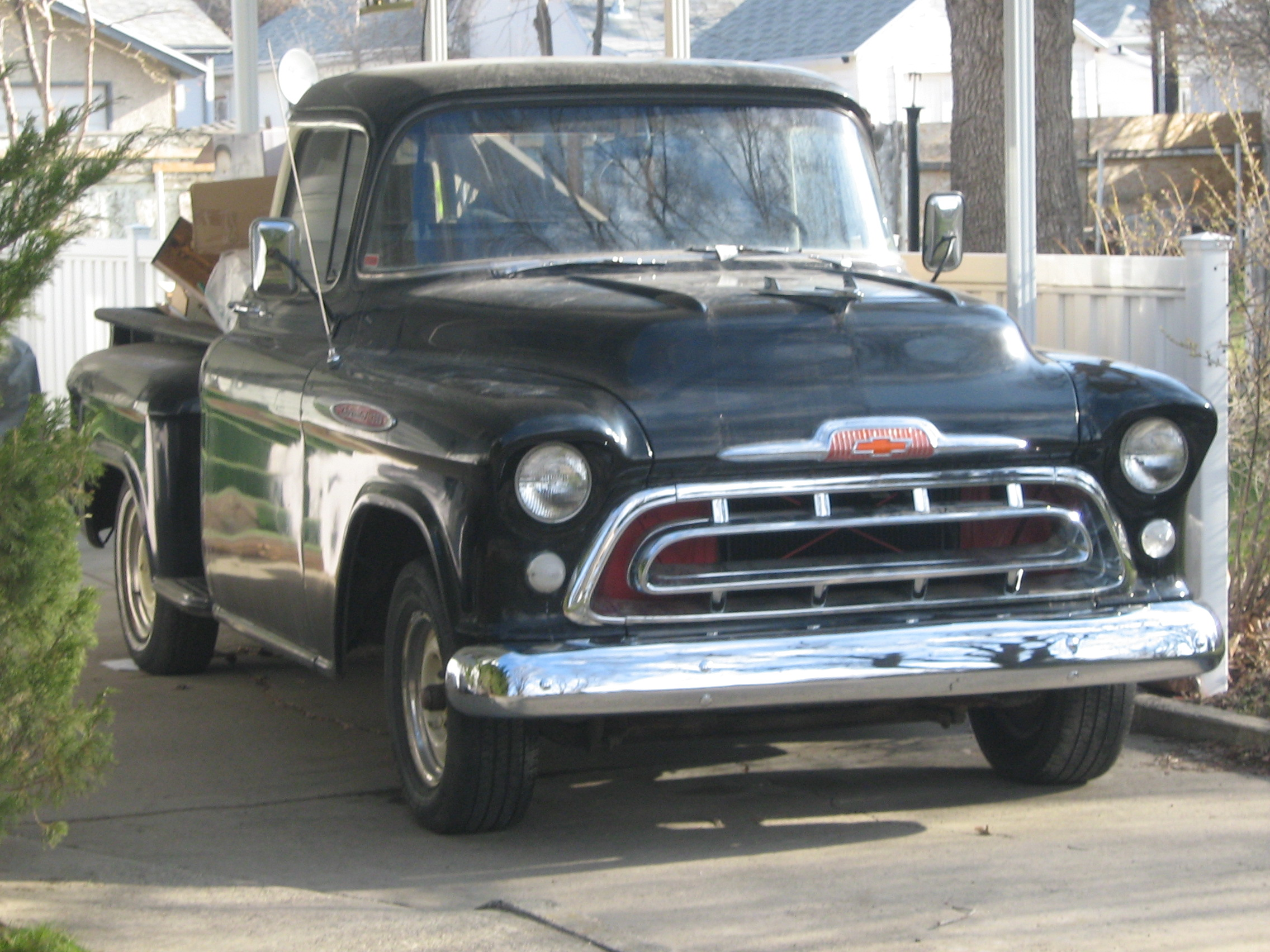
1957 Chevrolet Task Force

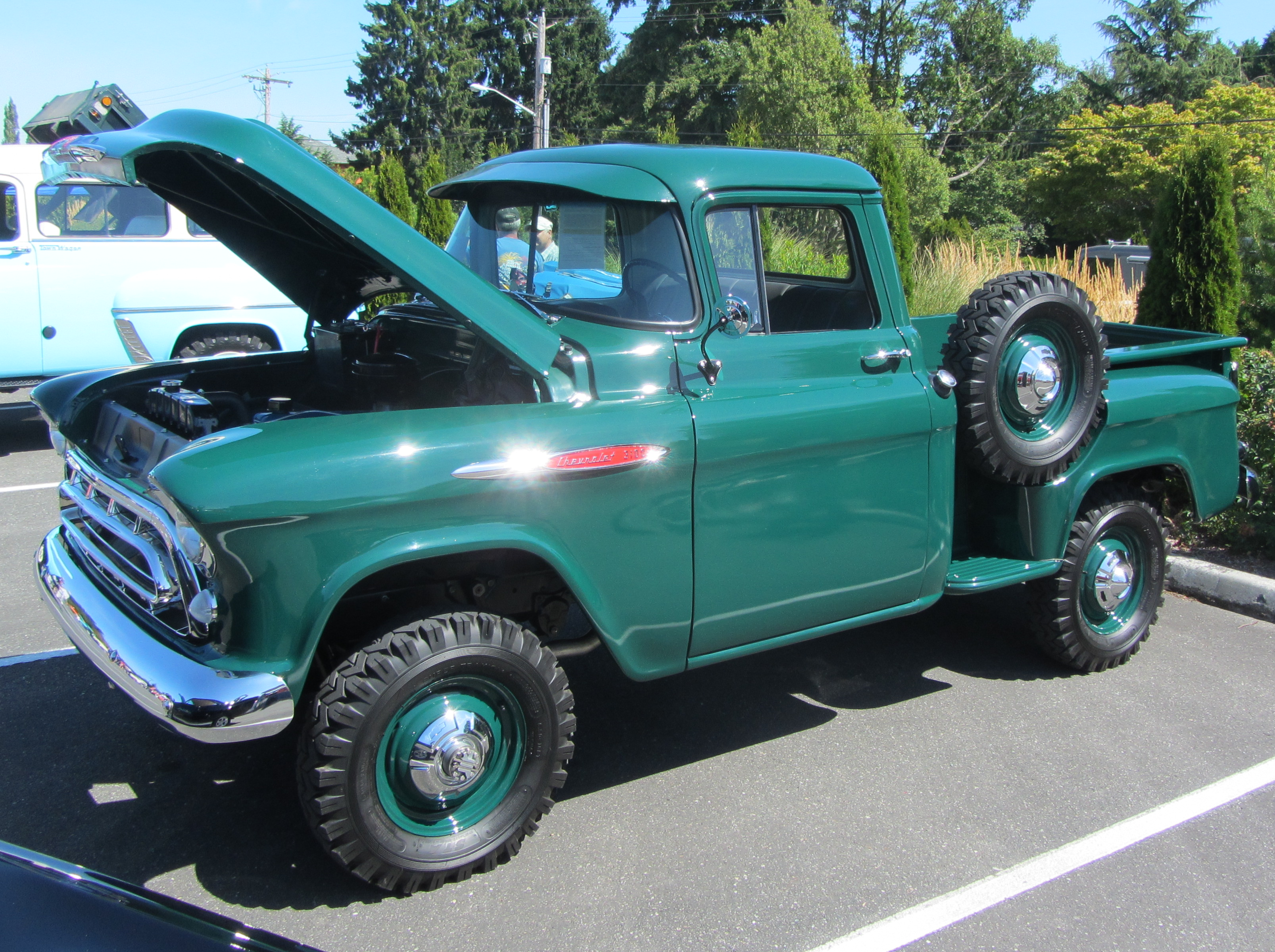
1957 Chevrolet Task Force NAPCO 4WD

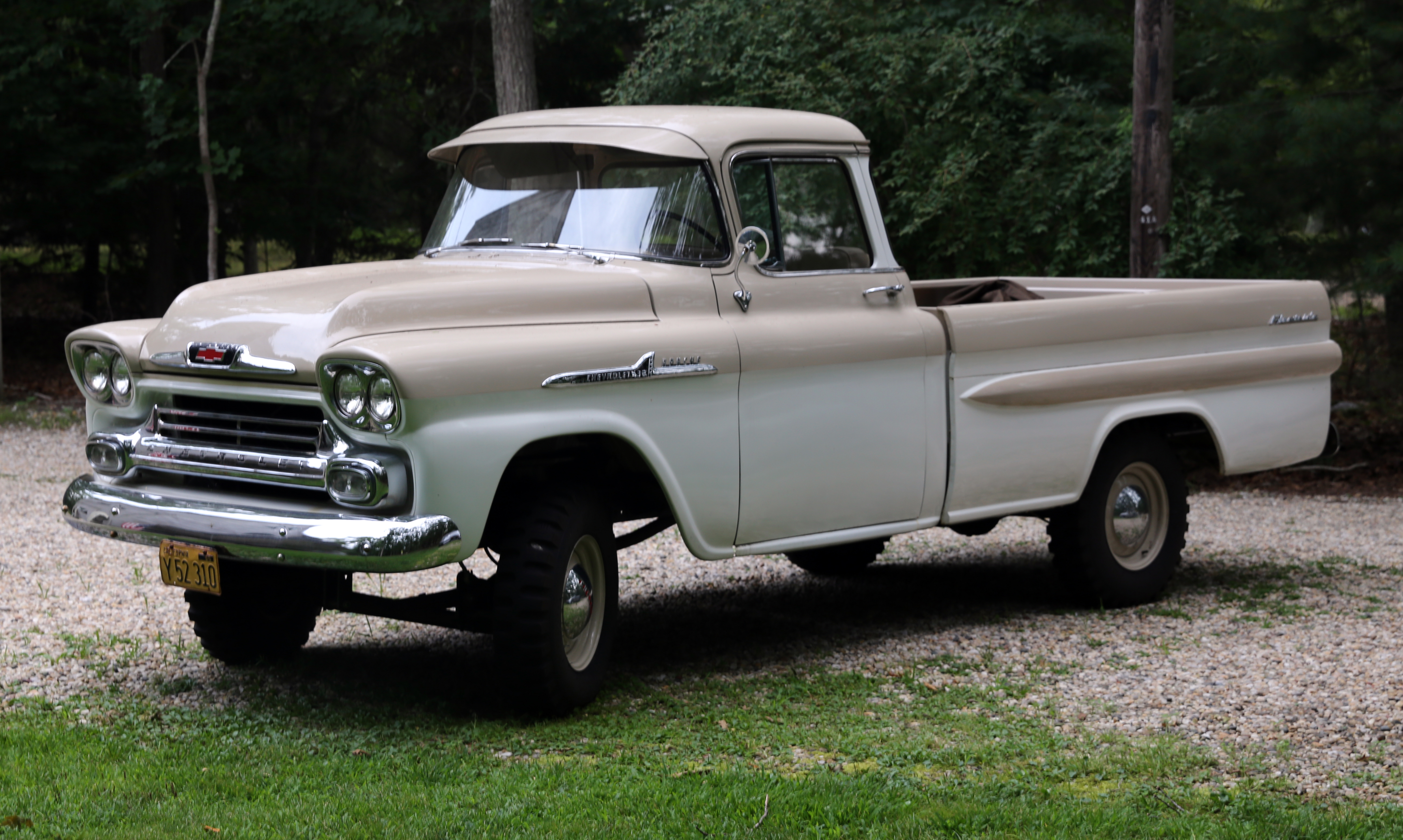
1958 Chevrolet Apache NAPCO 4WD

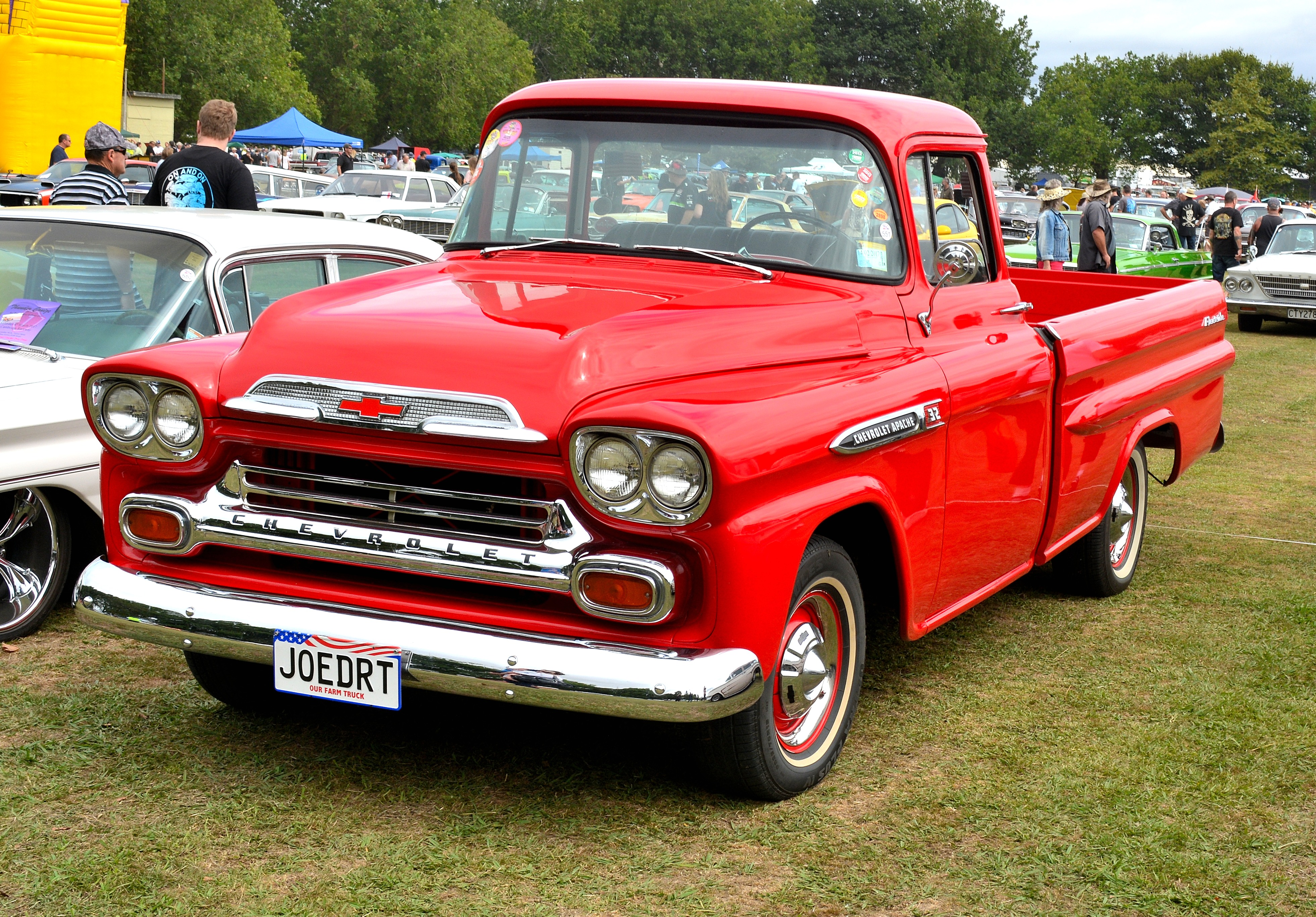
1959 Chevrolet Apache

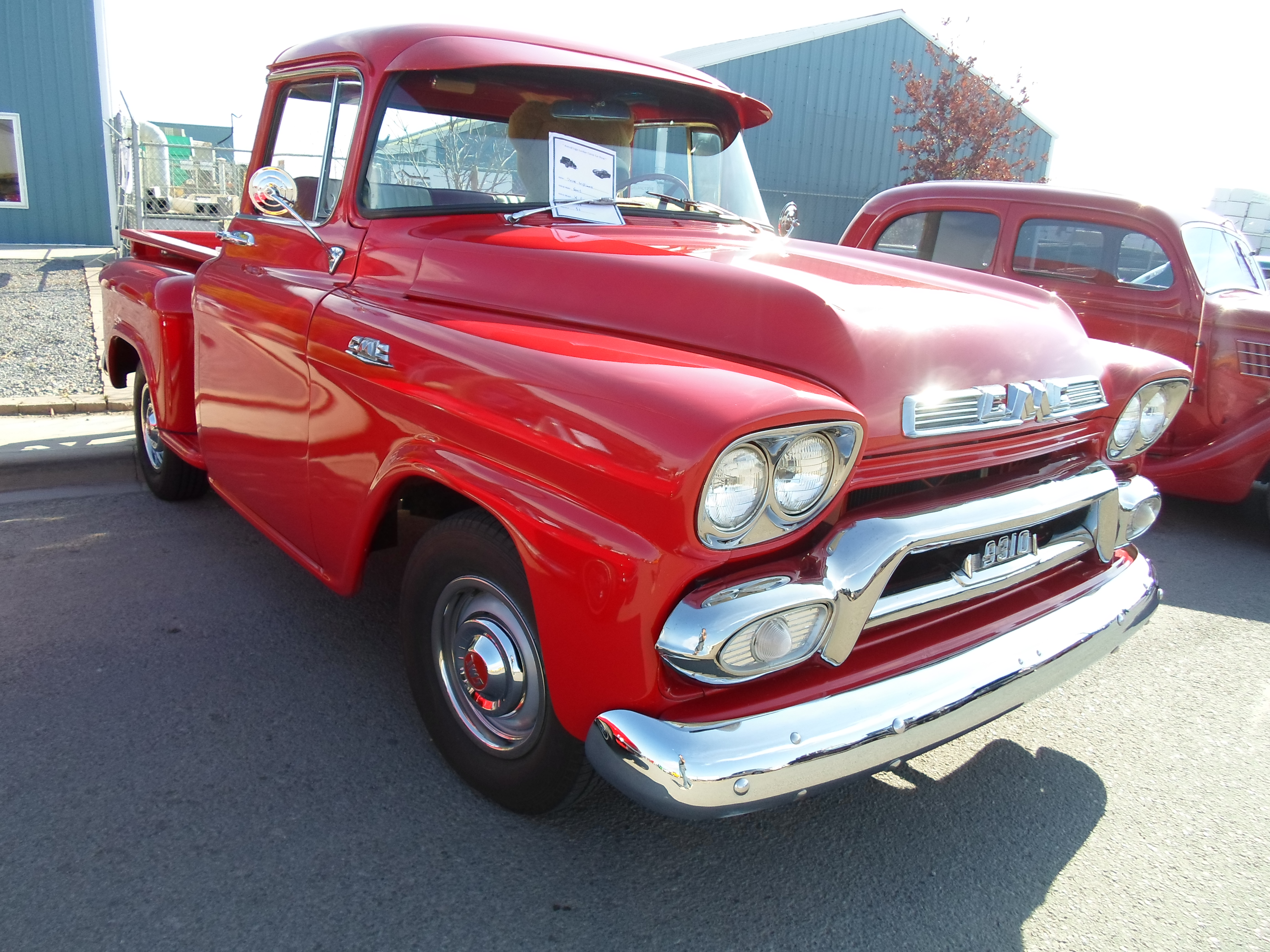
1959 GMC 9310

== Variants ==
=== Cameo Carrier/Suburban Pickup ===
Chevrolet Cameo Carrier
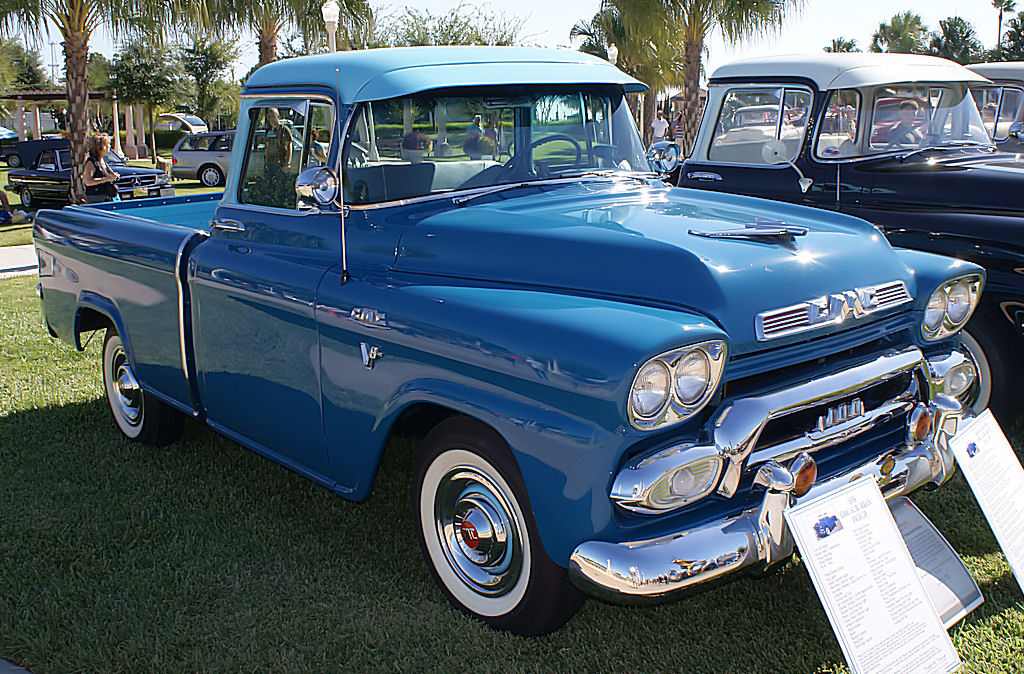
- 1959 GMC Suburban Pickup

Overview
- Model years: 1955-1959

Body and chassis
- Layout: Front engine, rear-wheel drive / four-wheel drive
- Platform: GM A platform

Powertrain
- Transmission: 3 or 4-speed manual; 3-speed Hydramatic

Dimensions
- Wheelbase: 114 in (2,896 mm)

The mid-1955 introduction of Chevrolet's Cameo Carrier pickup truck helped pave the way for the Fleetside. The Cameo offered an array of car-like features that included passenger-car styling with rear fenders continuing the cab's body lines to the back of the truck, two-tone paint, a relatively luxurious interior, whitewall tires, a chromed grille/front bumper/special rear bumper, as well as an optional V8 engine, automatic transmission, and power assist steering. The outer fender skins were fiberglass, attached to a standard, step-side steel cargo box. A standard tailgate was supported by retractable cables, with latches mounted inside the bed. The multi-piece rear bumper featured a door that accesses a hidden spare tire carrier.

As always, there was a GMC version offered during the same time, called the GMC Suburban Pickup, with many similar features offered on the Chevrolet but without the bedside trim. In 1957, a special version was made for GMC to be shown at national car shows called the Palomino, which had a Pontiac 347 cu in (5.7 L) V8 installed, borrowed from the 1957 Star Chief.

Other pickup truck producers, including Ford, Dodge, Studebaker and International, began to offer flush-side cargo boxes on some of their 1957 models, such as the Dodge C Series, and the 1960 Studebaker Champ. Though GM replaced the Cameo Carrier and Suburban Pickup with the Fleetside and Wideside before the 1950s were over, in time, pickup trucks with flush bodies and wider beds would become the dominant standard throughout the industry.

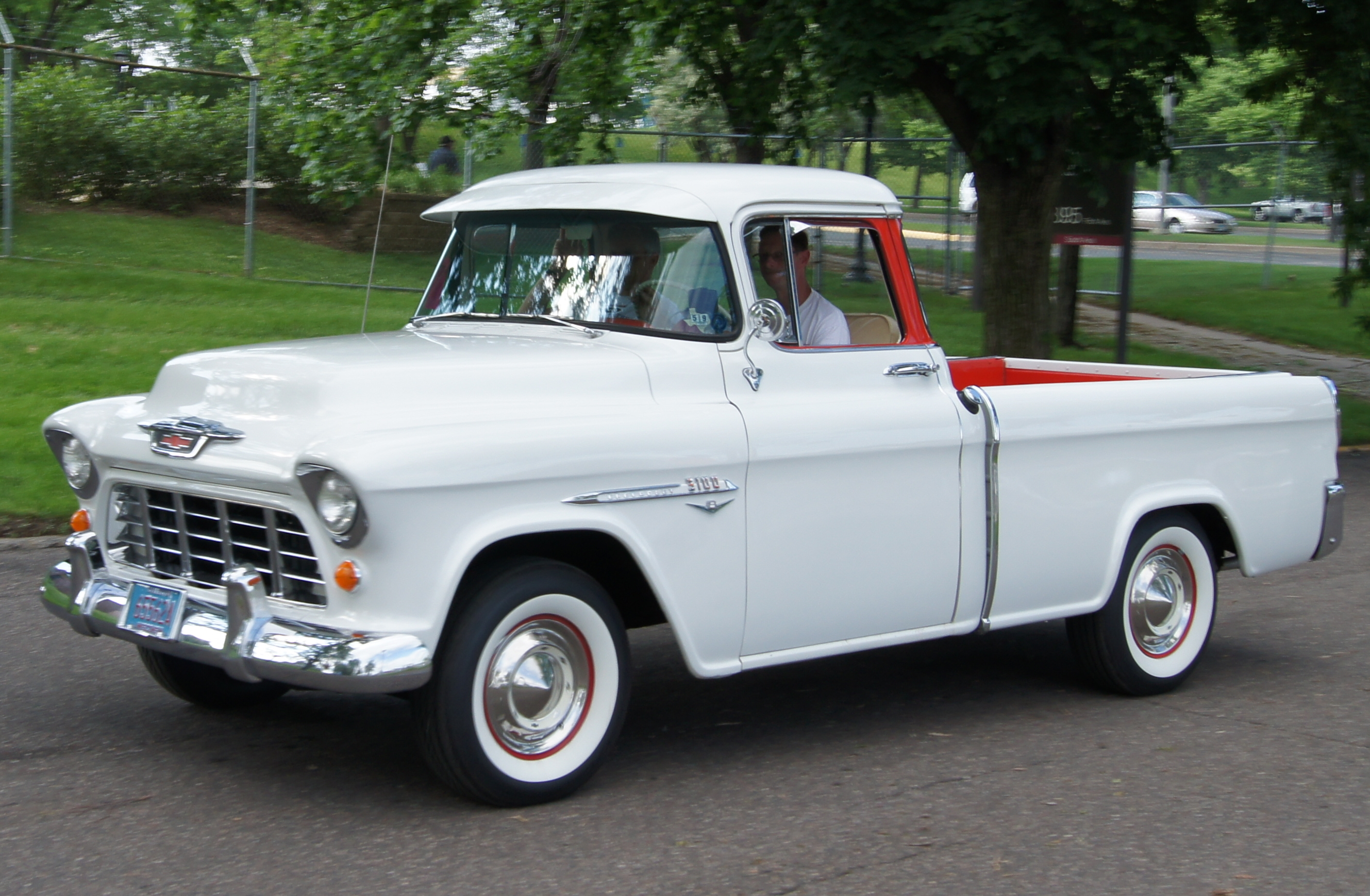
1955 Chevrolet Cameo Carrier

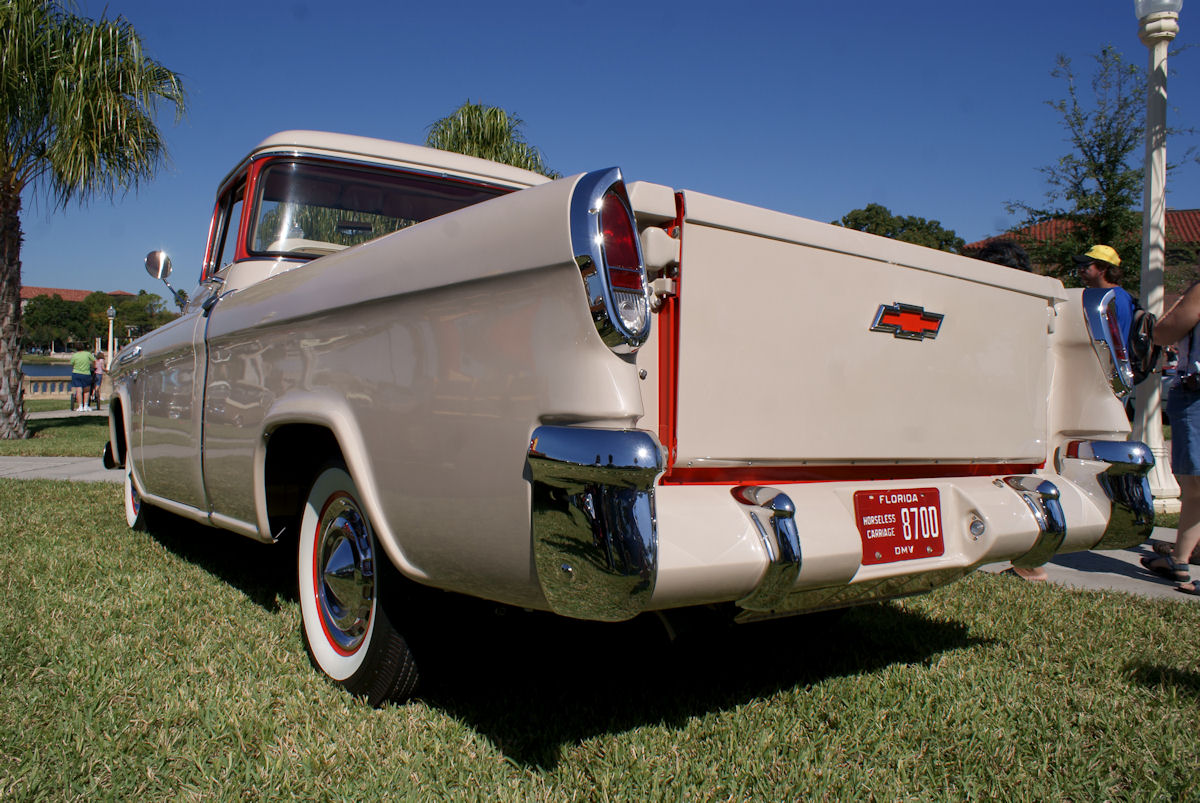
1956 Chevrolet Cameo Carrier

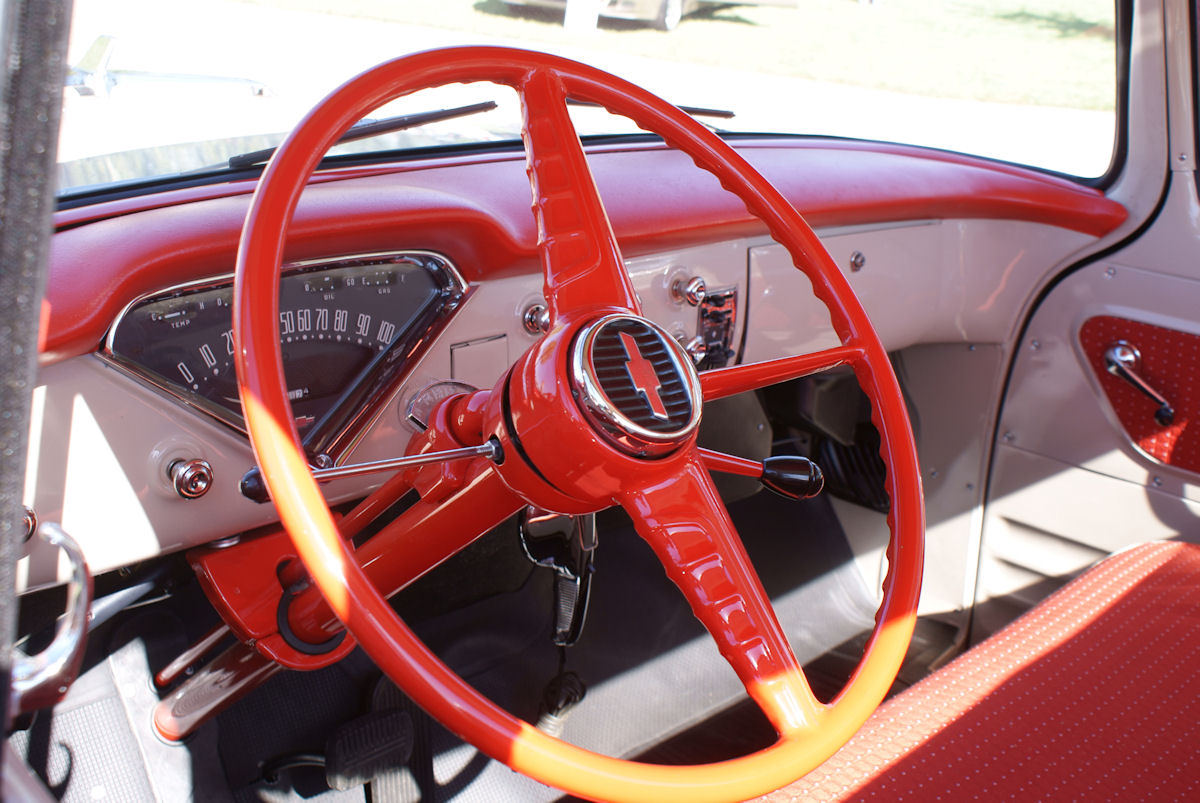
1956 Chevrolet Cameo Carrier interior

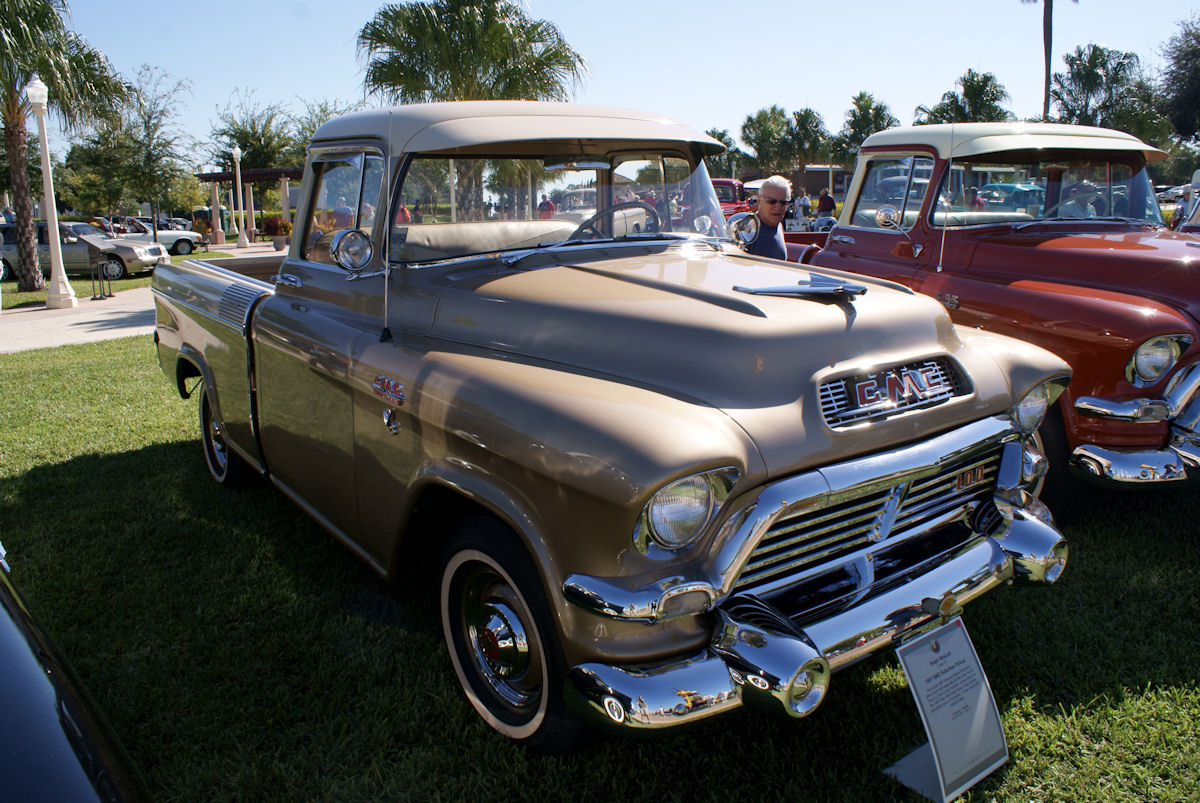
1957 GMC Palomino

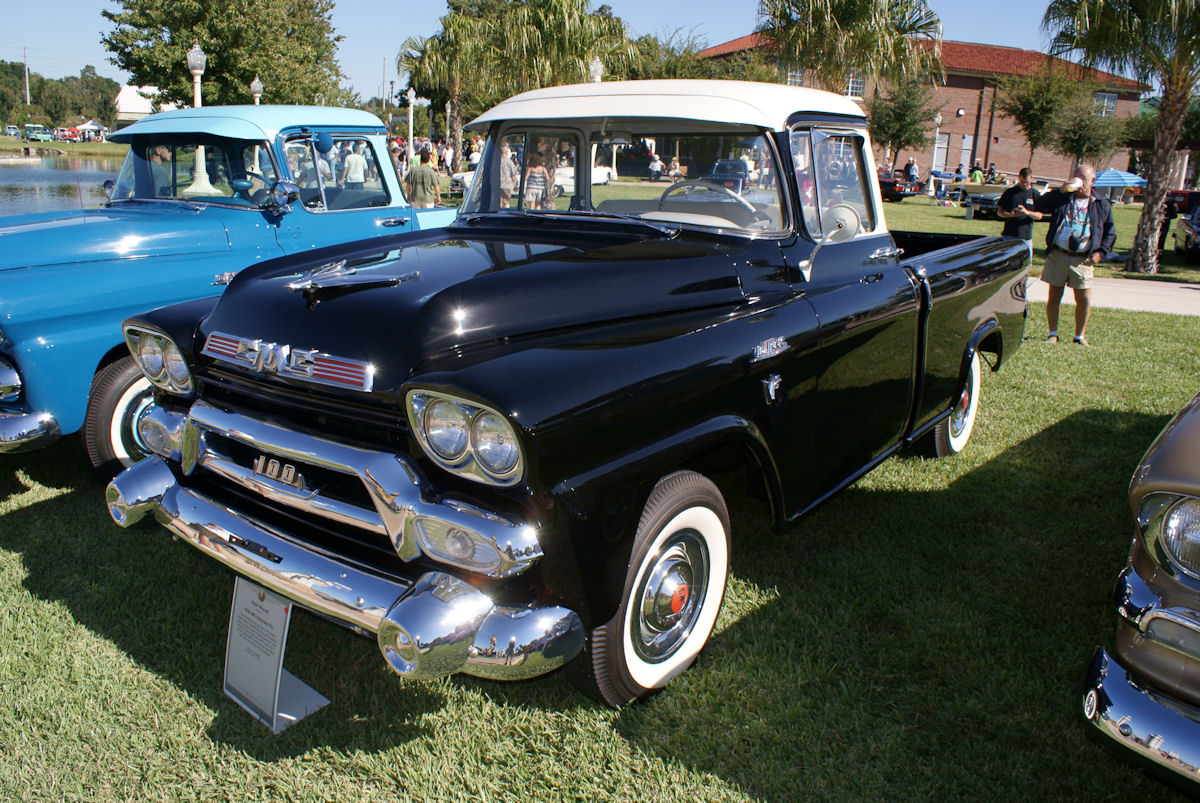
1958 GMC Suburban

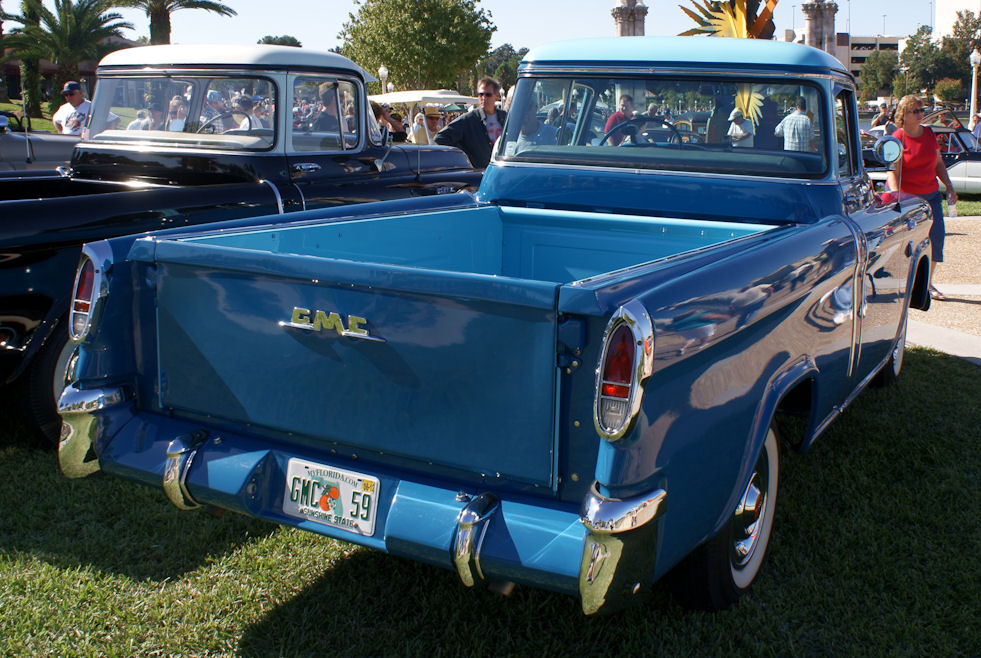
1959 GMC Suburban

=== Utility vehicles ===
The Task Force trucks formed the basis of the fourth-generation Chevrolet Suburban/GMC Carryall. Competing against the International Travelall and the Dodge Town Panel/Town Wagon, the Suburban became a Chevrolet nameplate (as GMC adopted the Carryall nameplate).

While marketed solely as a two-door utility wagon, the Suburban was offered in 1/2-ton 3100 and a 1-ton 3800 Suburban panel van was offered as an option. 3/4-ton 3600 Suburbans and Panel trucks were not available. Unlike the Advance Design-era trucks, there were no Canopy Express models offered.

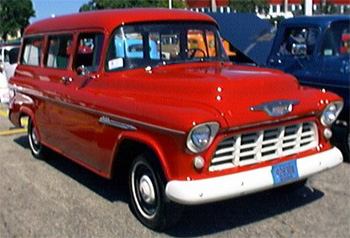
1955 Chevrolet Suburban

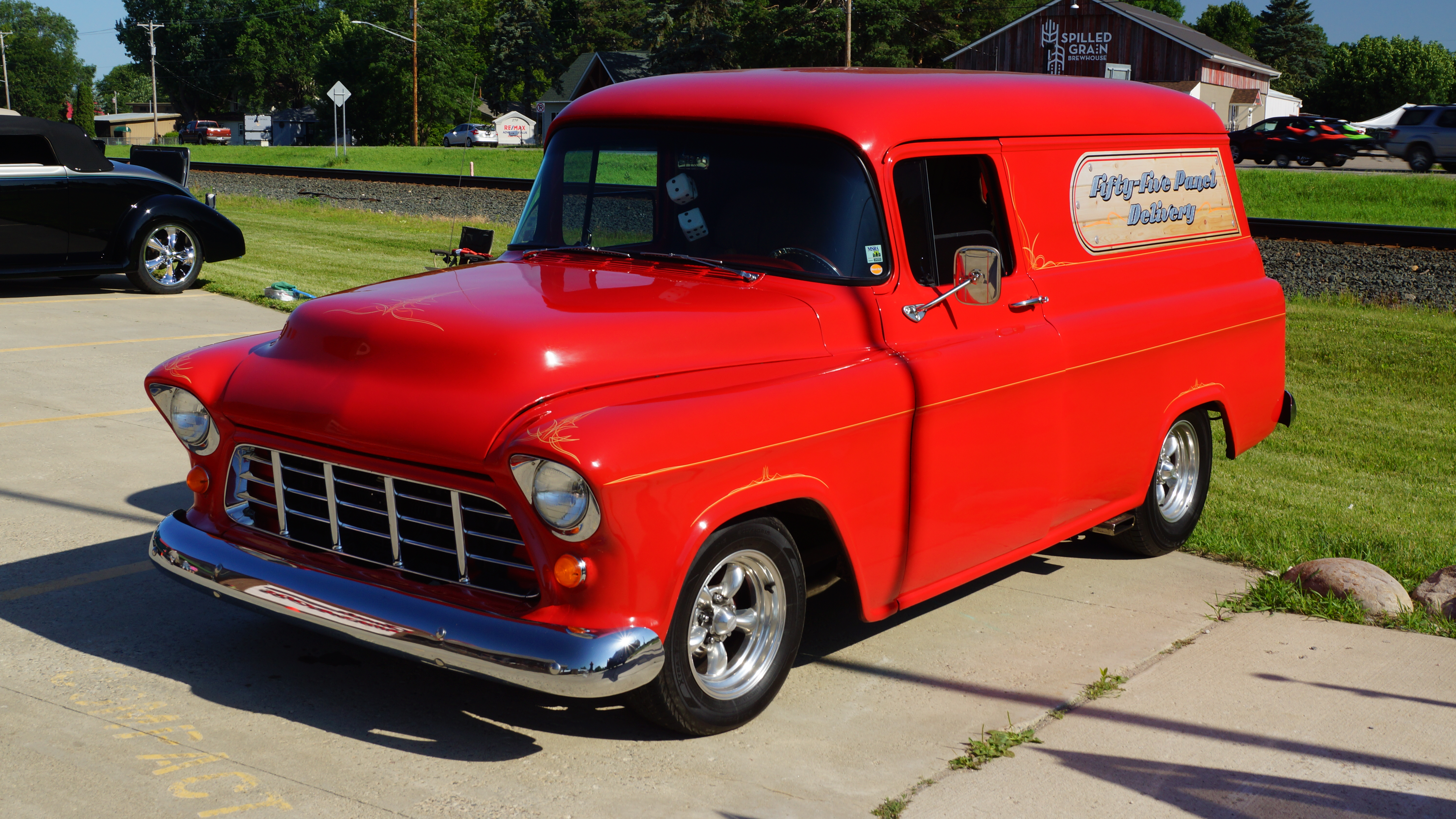
1955 Chevrolet Panel Truck

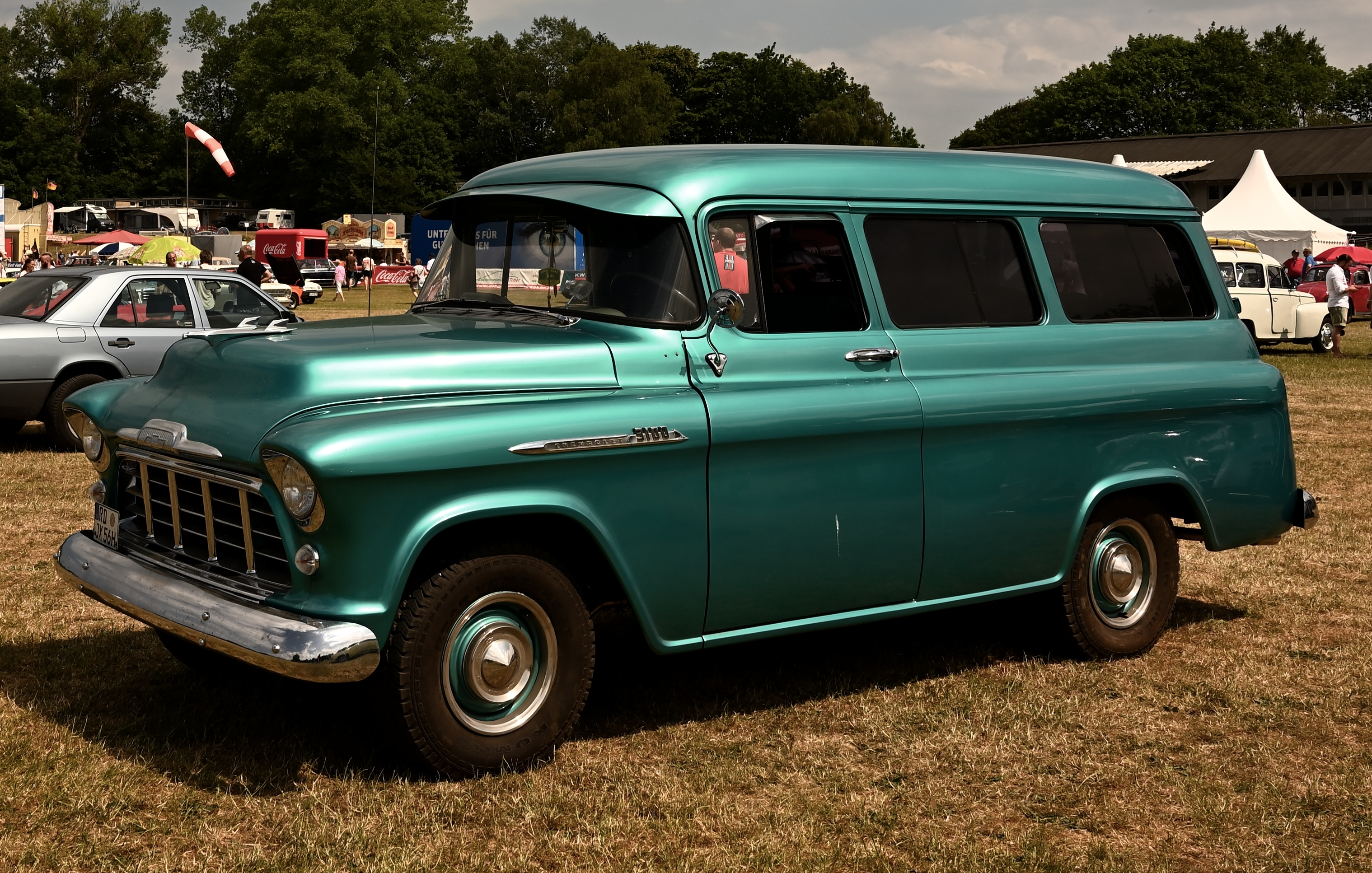
1956 Chevrolet Suburban

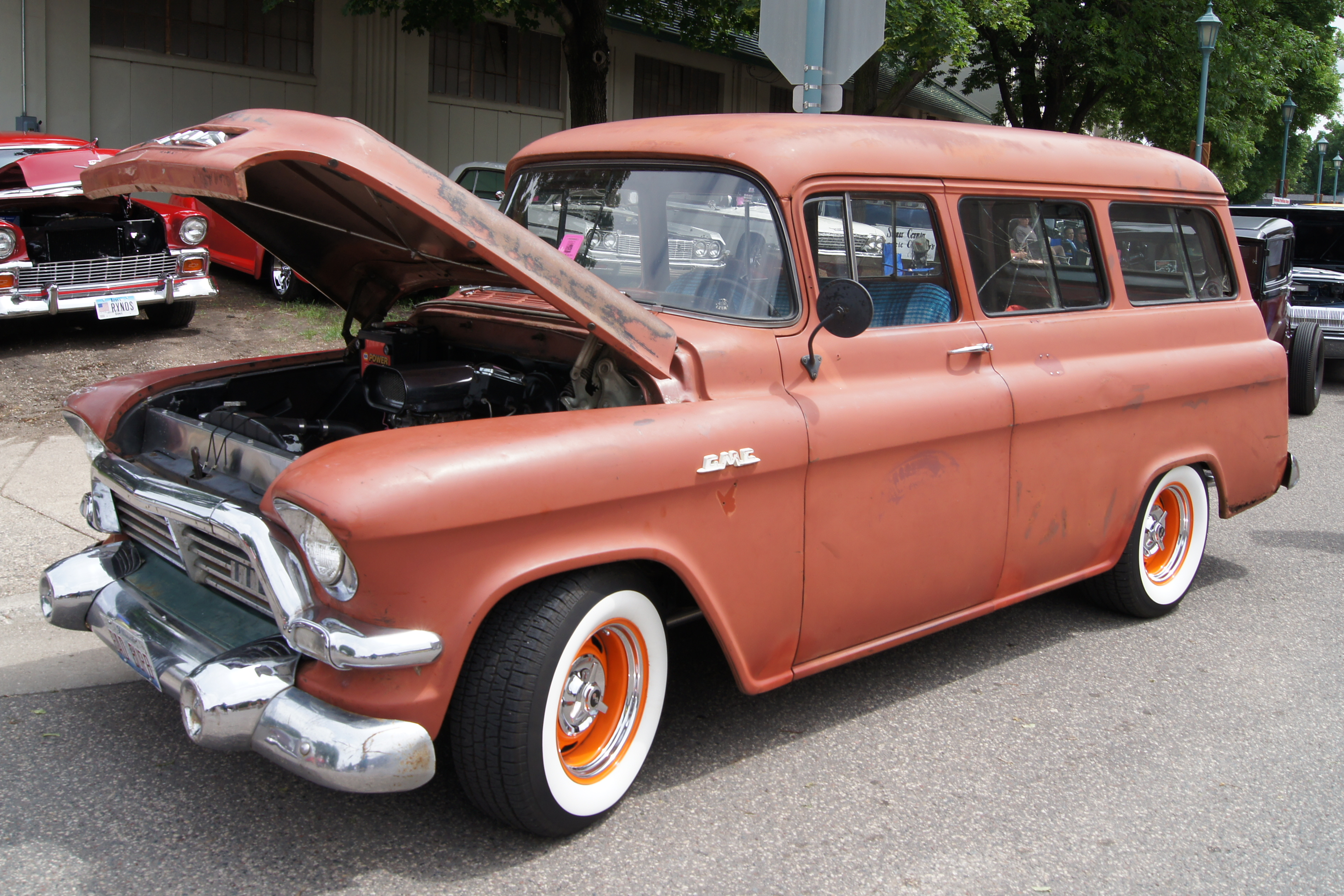
1957 GMC Carryall

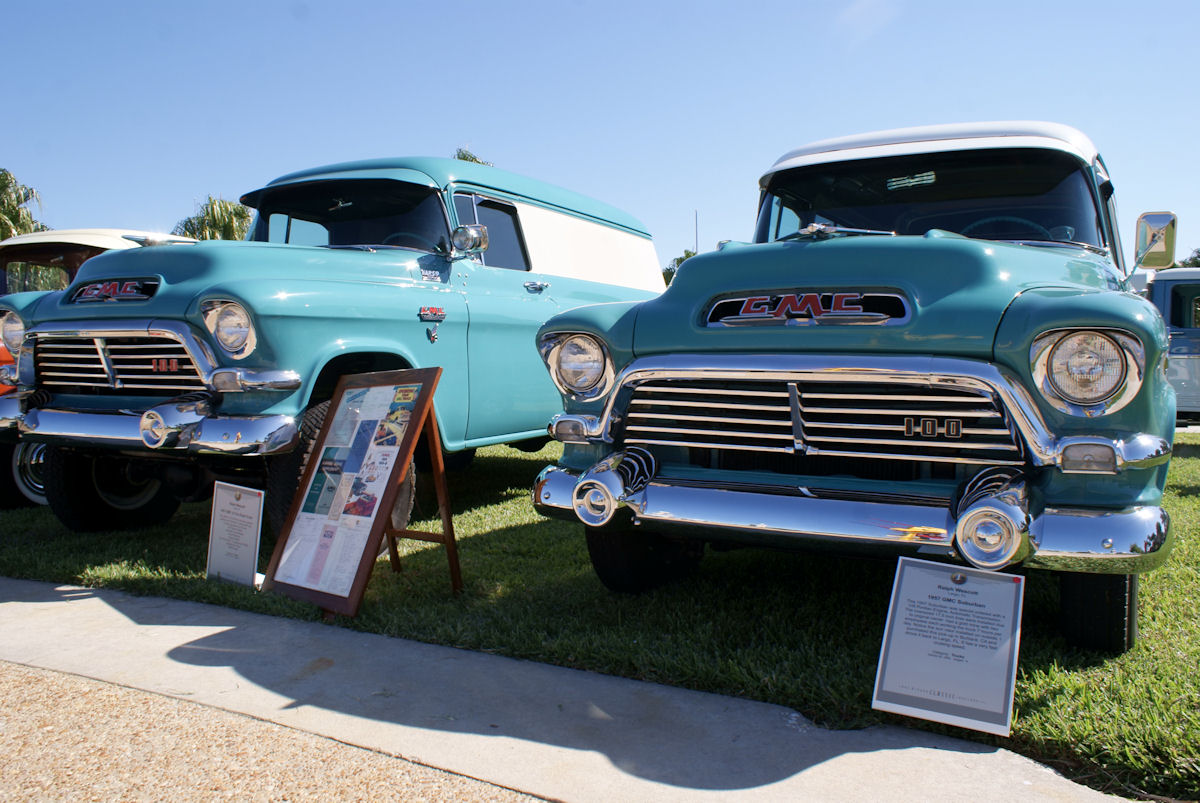
1957 GMC 100 Panel and Carryall

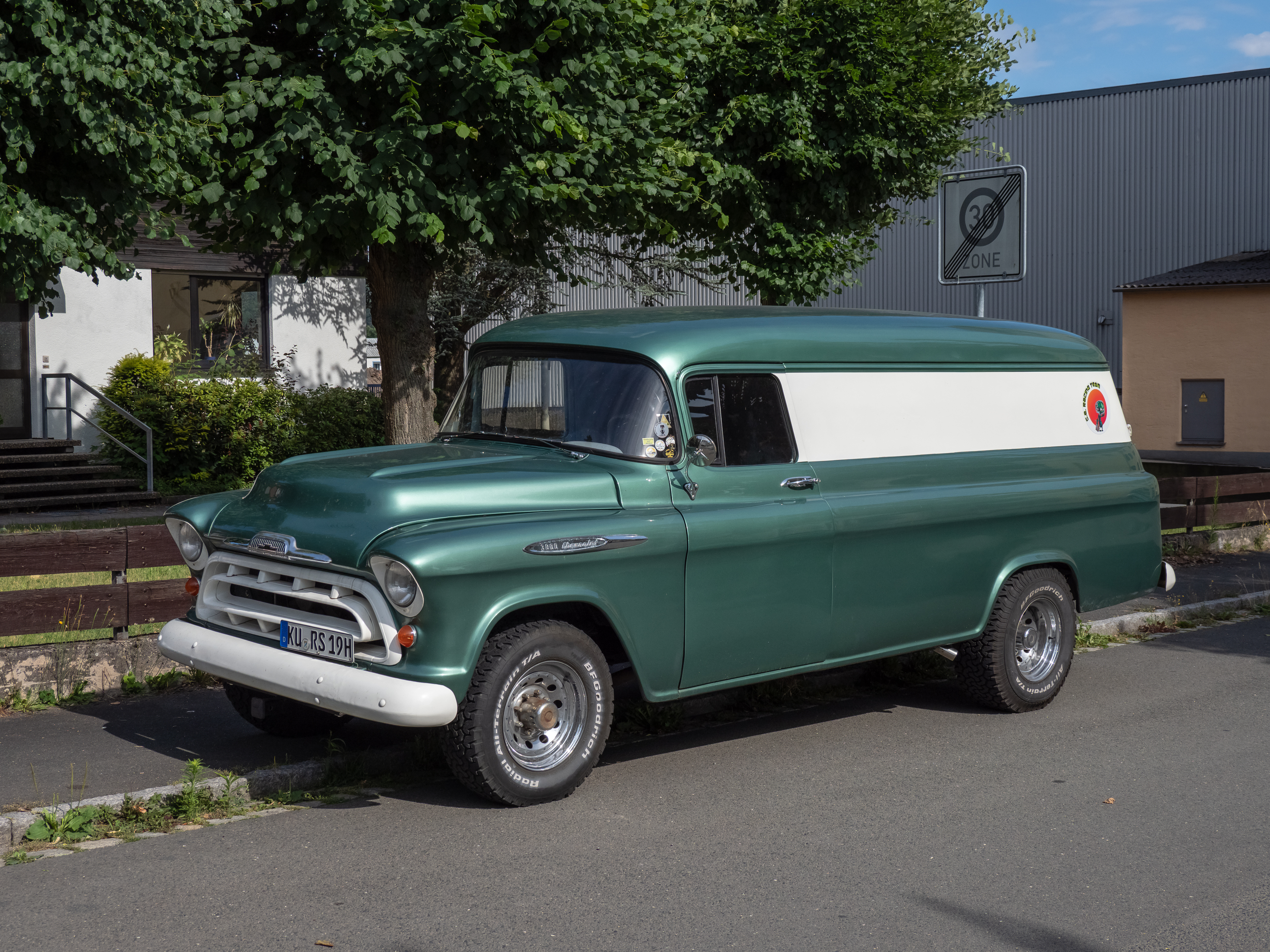
1957 Chevrolet 3800 Panel in Europe

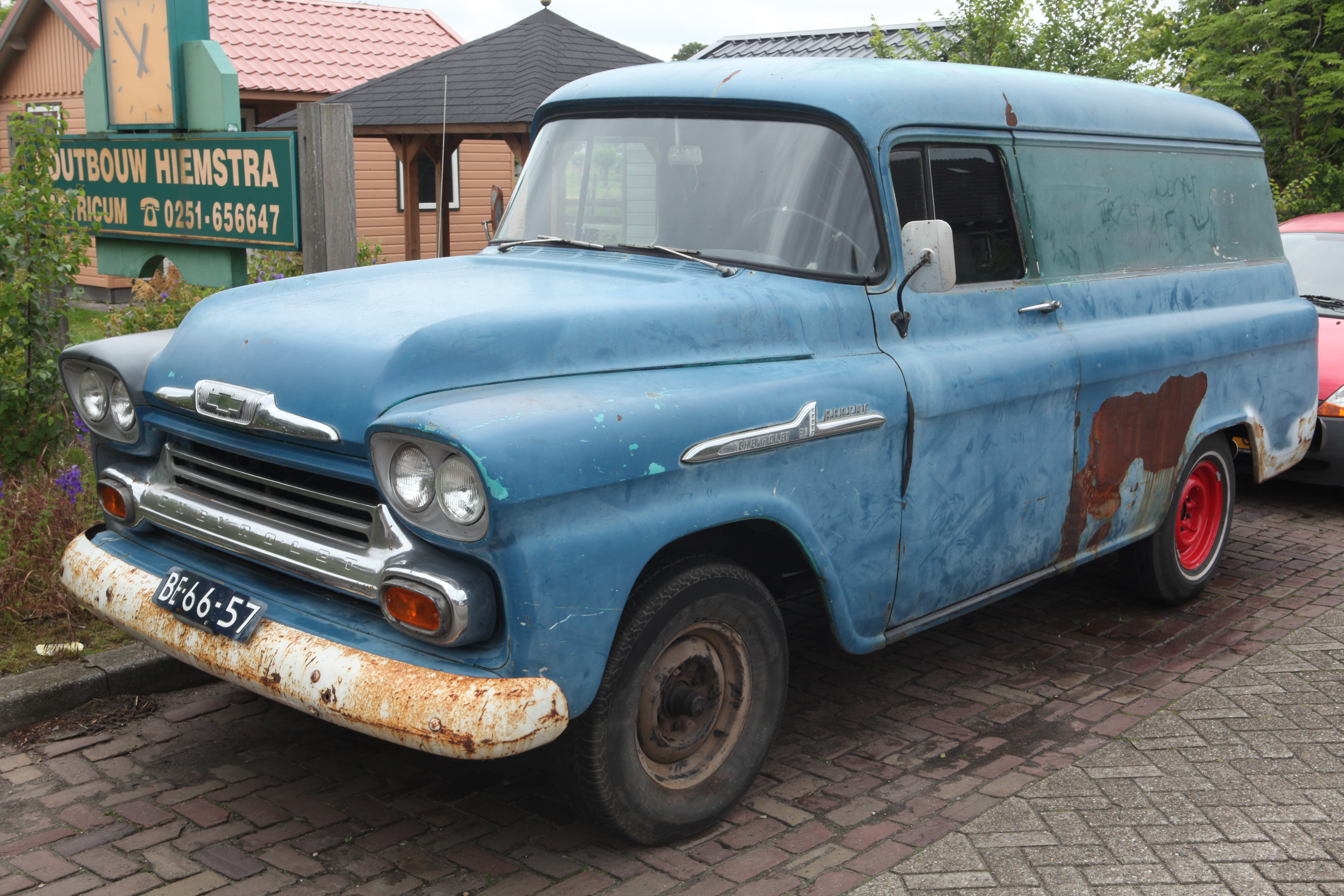
1958 Chevrolet 3100 Apache Suburban

=== Medium and heavy-duty trucks ===
Chevrolet and GMC continued to offer medium-duty versions of their Task Force and Blue-Chip trucks and GMC continued heavy-duty versions of their Blue-Chip trucks. Until the Task Force era however, heavy-duty trucks were exclusively the domain of GMC. Rather than offering the helmet-headed versions of the conventional trucks as cabover models, GM offered Low Cab Forward variants. These would serve as the predecessors to the B-Series trucks of the early-1960s. GMC began building heavy-duty cabovers again in 1959, which were completely separate from the Task Force/Blue Chip models, and both divisions resumed building medium-duty cabover L-Series trucks in 1960.

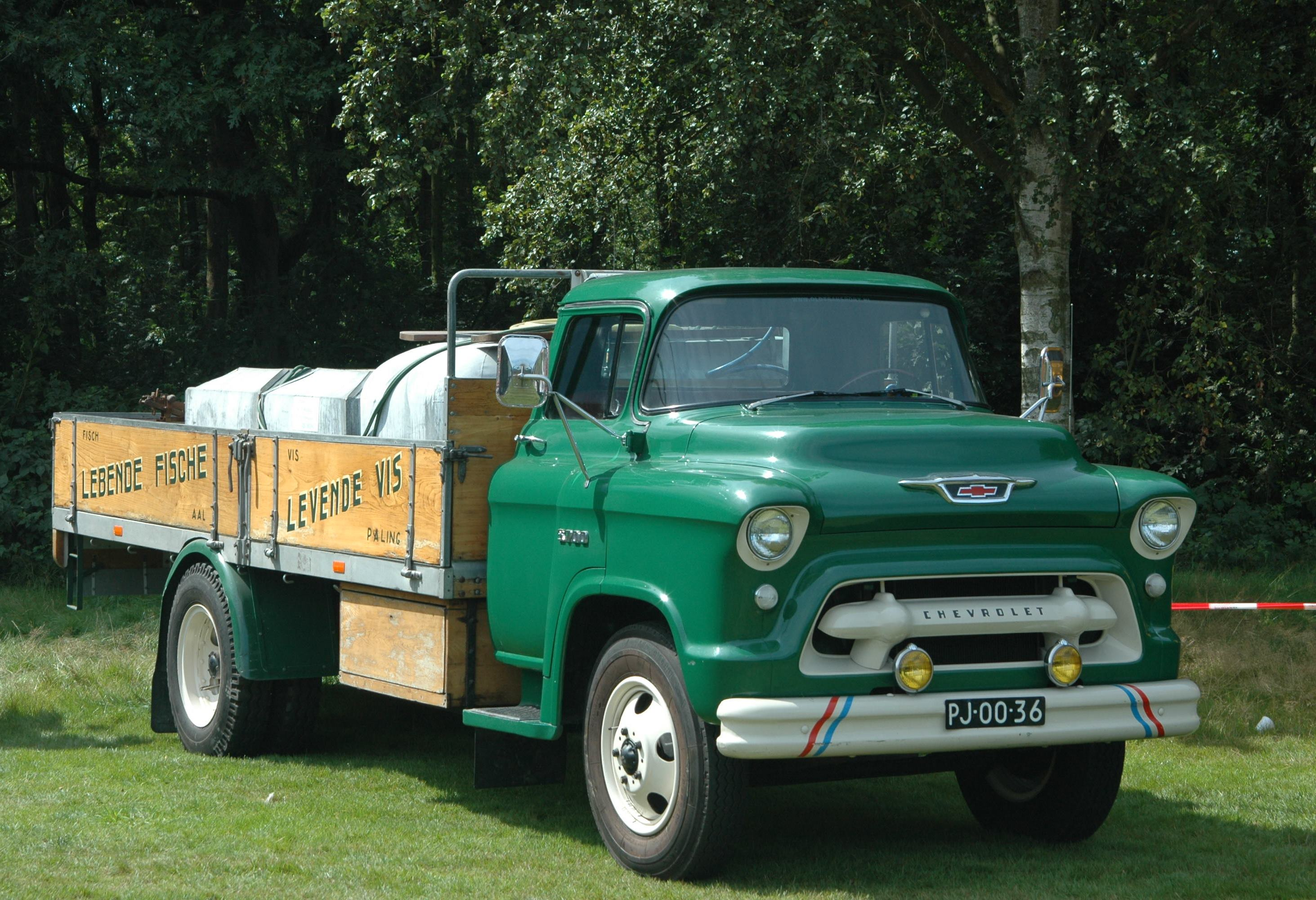
1955 Chevrolet 5700 Low Cab Forward model.

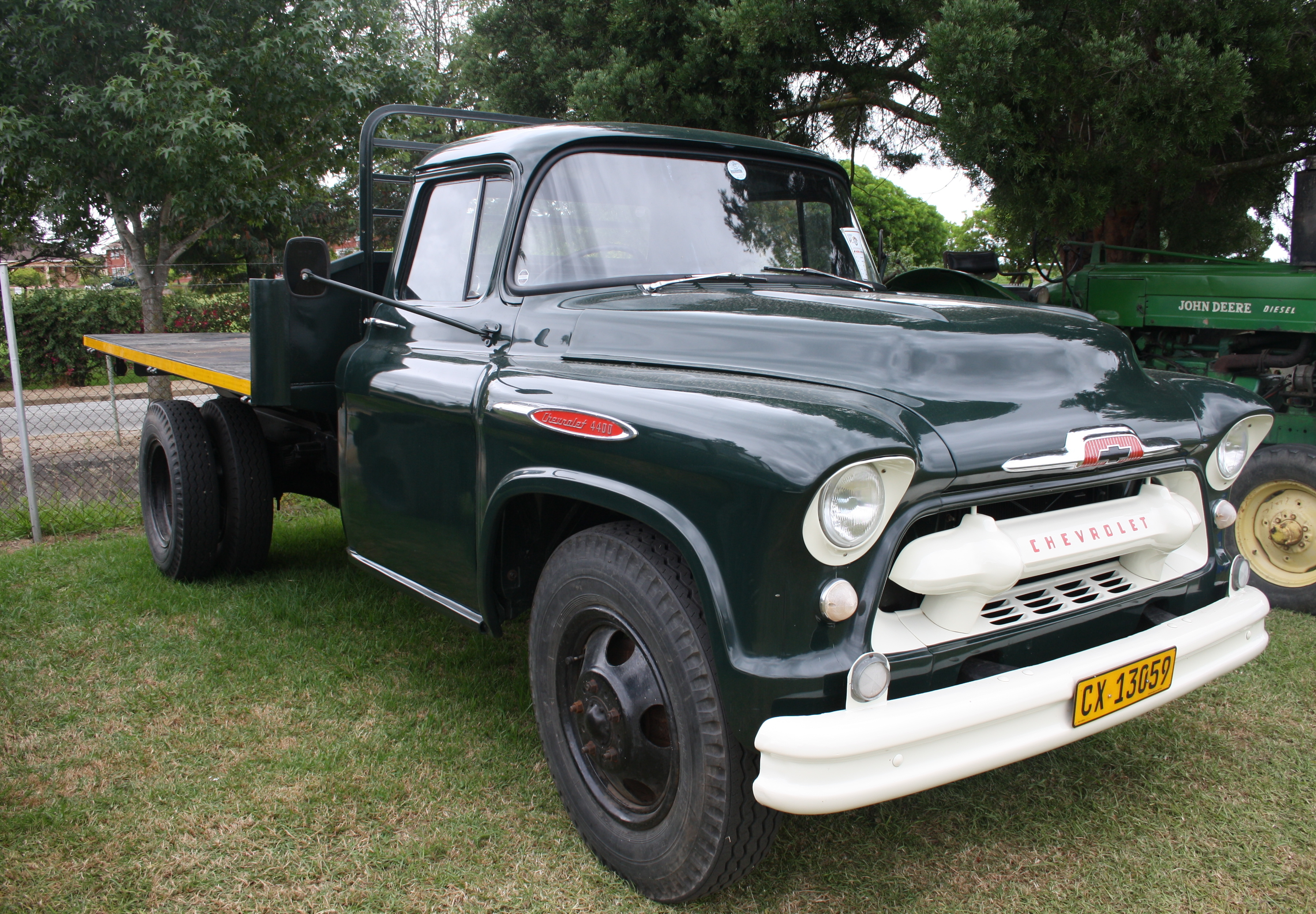
1957 Chevrolet 4400

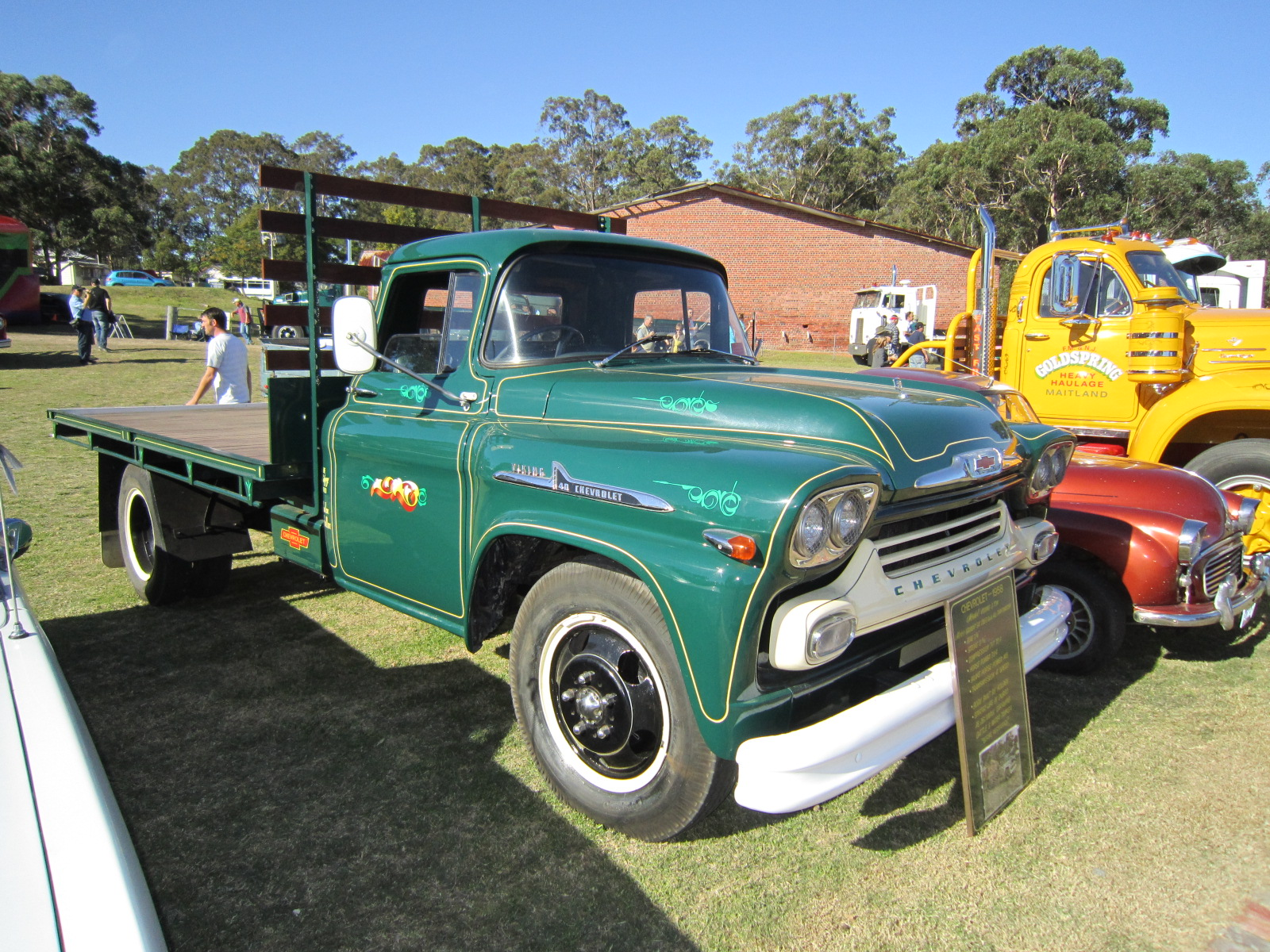
1958 Chevrolet Viking 40 platform truck in Australia

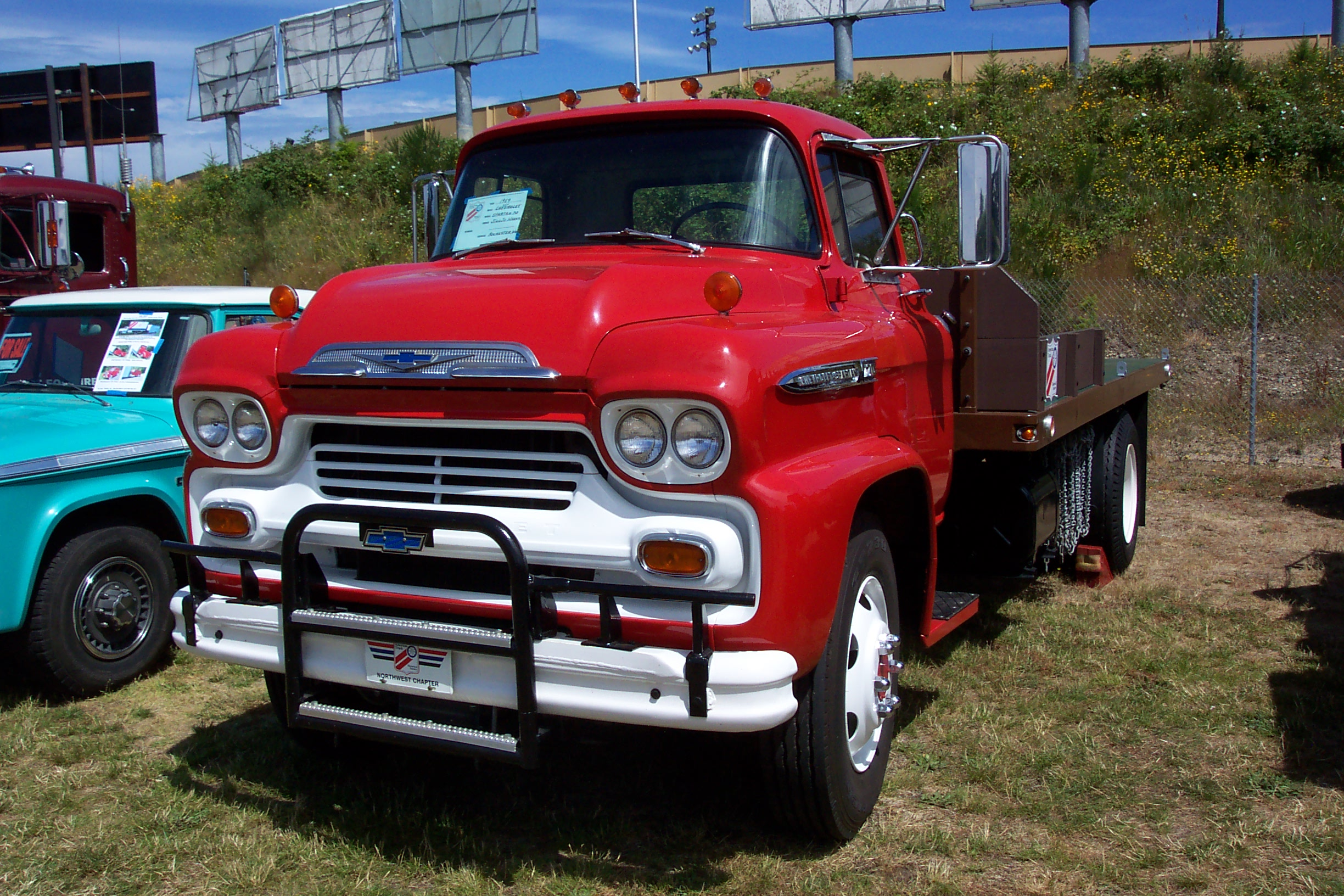
1959 Chevrolet Spartan 80
