= USS Apache =

USS Apache or USNS Apache has been the name of more than one United States Navy ship, and may refer to:

- USS Apache (1889), a tug in commission in 1898 and again in service from 1900 to 1925
- USS Apache (1891), a United States Coast Guard Cutter in commission in the U.S. Navy from 1917 to 1919
- USS Apache (SP-729), later USS SP-729, a patrol boat in commission from 1917 to 1919
- USS Apache (ATF-67), ex-AT-67, a fleet tug in commission from 1942 to 1946 and from 1951 to 1974
- USNS Apache (T-ATF-172), a fleet tug in commission with the Military Sealift Command from 1981 to 2022
