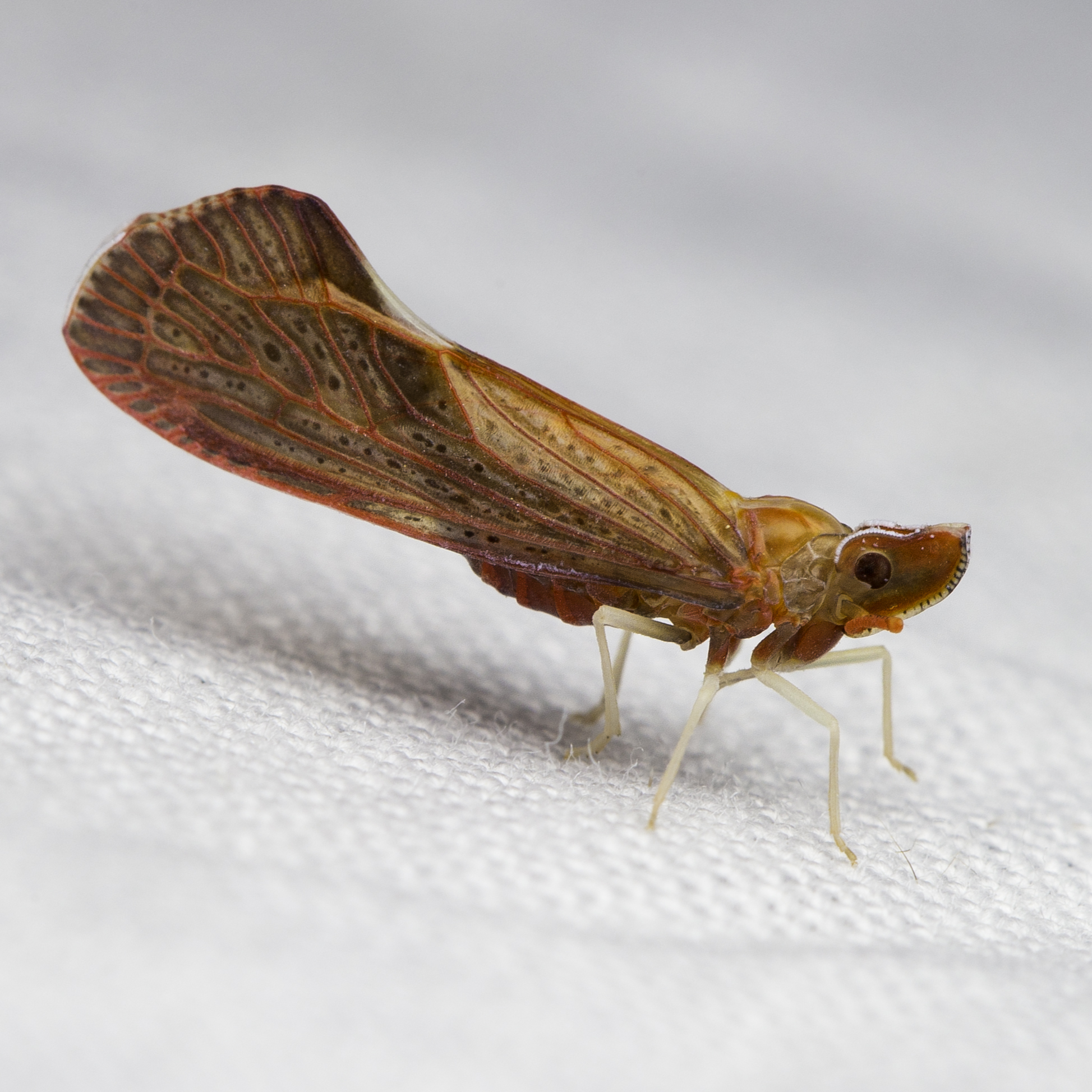
- Apache californicum
- Apache degeerii

Scientific classification
- Kingdom: Animalia
- Phylum: Arthropoda
- Clade: Pancrustacea
- Class: Insecta
- Order: Hemiptera
- Suborder: Auchenorrhyncha
- Infraorder: Fulgoromorpha
- Family: Derbidae
- Subfamily: Otiocerinae
- Genus: Apache; Kirkaldy, 1901

= Apache (planthopper) =

Genus of true bugs

Apache is a genus of two distinctive North American species of true bugs in the family Derbidae.

== Species ==
There are two species in the genus Apache:

- Apache californicum Wilkey, 1963
- Apache degeerii (Kirby, 1821)
