= Apache (train) =

Passenger train in the western United States

Overview
- Service type: Inter-city rail
- Status: Discontinued
- Locale: Southern California, Arizona, New Mexico, west Texas, Kansas, Missouri, Iowa and Illinois
- First service: April 1, 1926
- Last service: February 13, 1938
- Former operators: Southern Pacific; Rock Island

Route
- Termini: Los Angeles; Chicago

Technical
- Track gauge: 4 ft 8 1/2 in (1,435 mm) standard gauge

The Apache was a passenger train of the Southern Pacific on its route between Los Angeles and Tucumcari, New Mexico, and over the connecting Rock Island to Chicago. Service over this route had begun as the Golden State Express on February 1, 1925, until the name was changed to Apache. Trains initially carried coaches plus standard and tourist sleepers between Los Angeles and Chicago. On December 11, 1932, the Great Depression caused consolidation of the Apache with Rock Island trains 7 and 14 east of Tucumcari. The train added standard sleepers between Los Angeles and Minneapolis, Minnesota, and between Chicago and Mexico City via Phoenix, Arizona, in October, 1933. Rock Island resumed operation of the Apache as a separate train on June 1, 1935. The Minneapolis and Mexico City sleepers were eliminated from the train on November 1, 1937, and the Apache was eliminated in favor of the Golden State Limited on February 13, 1938.
