= Apache Pizza =

Irish pizza chain

- Industry: Restaurants
- Founded: June 9, 1996; 30 years ago in Dublin
- Founders: Robert Pendleton
- Headquarters: Balbriggan, Dublin, Ireland
- Number of locations: 200+ restaurants (2023)
- Area served: Republic of Ireland, Northern Ireland
- Key people: Derek Mulligan (Managing Director; John O'Connor (Chief Financial Officer); Jordan Pendleton (Chief Technical Officer)
- Products: Pizza
- Number of employees: ▲3,000 (2023); 1,000 (2016)
- Website: apache.ie

Apache Pizza is an Irish pizza delivery and takeaway restaurant chain founded in 1996 by Robert Pendleton and Emily Gore Grimes, who opened the first Apache Pizza store in Sutton, Dublin.

Over the past 30 years, it has grown to become Ireland's largest pizza chain, operating more than 200 stores across the island of Ireland.

Apache Pizza is known for its American-style pizzas, locally operated franchise network, and nationwide delivery and collection service.

== Expansion ==
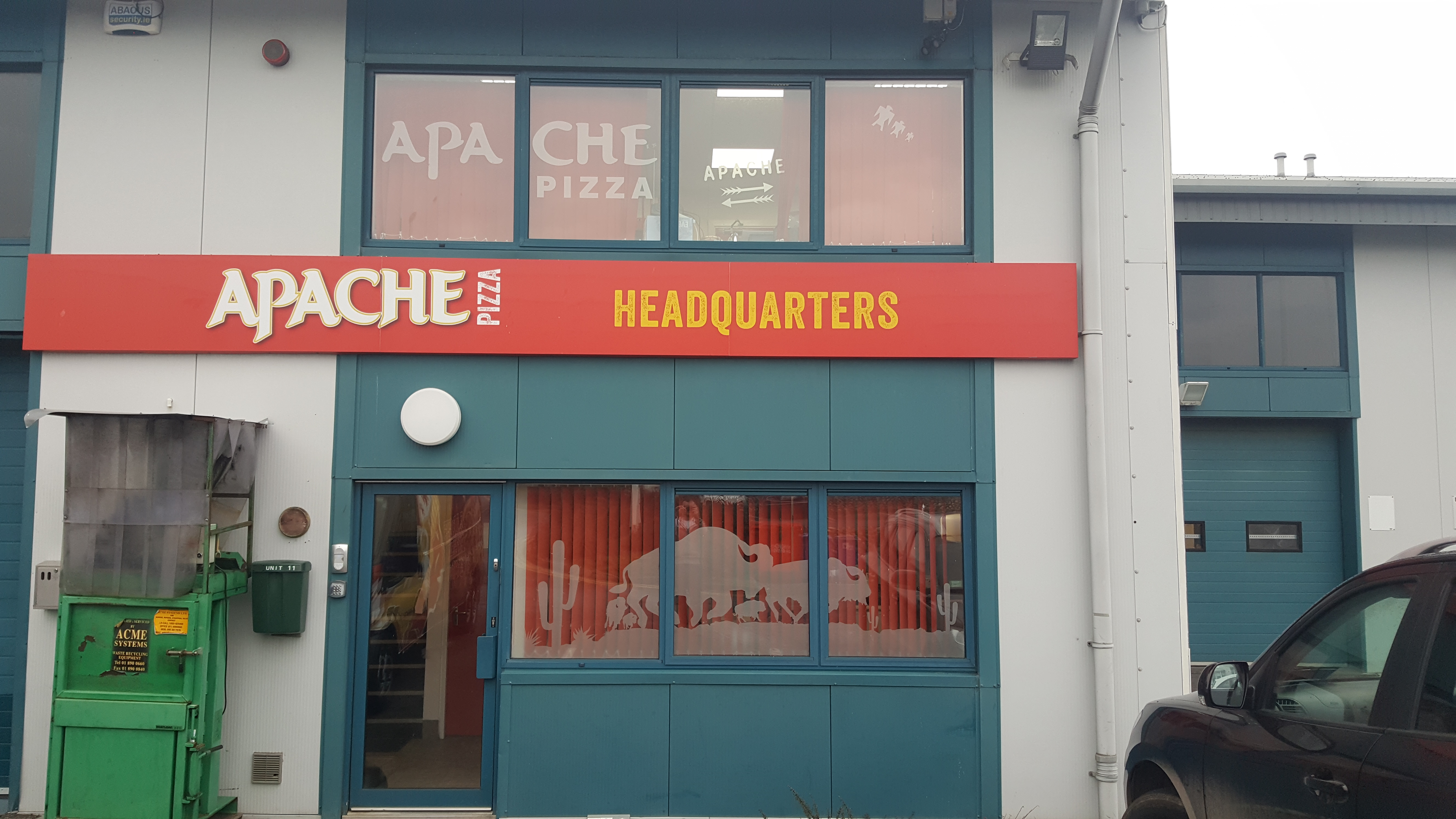
Apache Pizza headquarters

Since opening its first store in Sutton, Dublin, in 1996, Apache Pizza has expanded across both the Republic of Ireland and Northern Ireland through a franchise model.

In March 2018, Spanish restaurant group Food Delivery Brands acquired a majority stake in the business as part of a joint venture with OKR.

== Awards ==
In 2014, Fox News listed Apache Pizza as one of the best pizza chains in the world.

In 2015, Just Eat named Apache Pizza Ireland's Best Takeaway.

Apache Pizza was shortlisted for the Best Chain category at the Just Eat Awards in 2025.

== Franchise model ==
Apache Pizza operates primarily through a franchise model, with independently owned and operated stores across the Republic of Ireland and Northern Ireland. Franchisees receive training, operational support and business systems from the company while managing the day-to-day operation of their own stores. As of 2026, Apache Pizza operates more than 200 locations across the island of Ireland.

== Current activities ==
Apache Pizza regularly introduces seasonal menu items and limited-time promotional partnerships as part of its marketing activity. The company also participates in promotional events and community engagement initiatives across Ireland, including gaming events and university Freshers' activations.

In 2026, Apache Pizza celebrated its 30th anniversary by giving away complimentary pizza slices at more than 200 stores across the island of Ireland as part of a nationwide customer promotion.
