= Gene Winfield =

American automotive customizer (1927–2025)

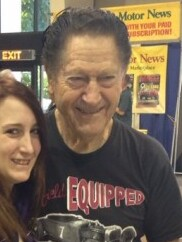
- Winfield in 2014
- Born: Robert Eugene Winfield; June 16, 1927; Springfield, Missouri, U.S.
- Died: March 4, 2025 (aged 97); Atascadero, California, U.S.
- Occupation: Automotive designer
- Spouses: Delores Johnson (divorced); Kathy Horrigan (divorced)
- Children: 3
- Website: www.winfieldsrodandcustom.com/

Roger Eugene Winfield (June 16, 1927 – March 4, 2025) was an American automotive customizer and fabricator. In the mid-1960s, his designs caught the attention of the film community, resulting in a large body of his work appearing on screen, including in the iconic 1982 film Blade Runner.

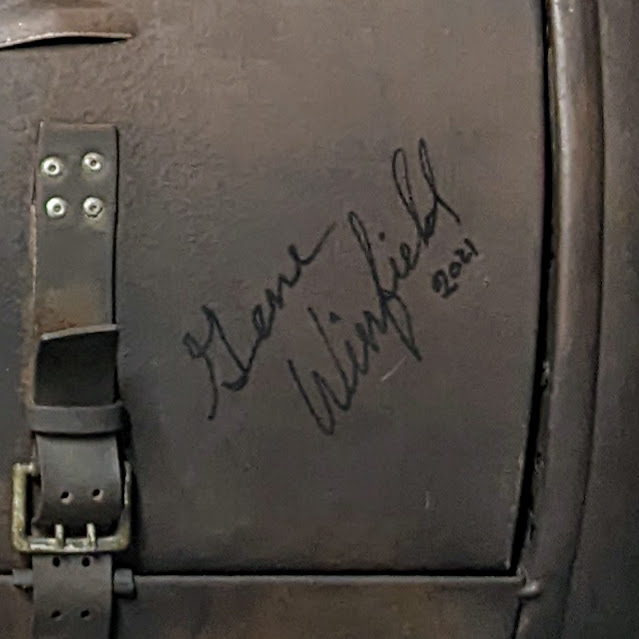
Gene Winfield's signature

== Early life ==
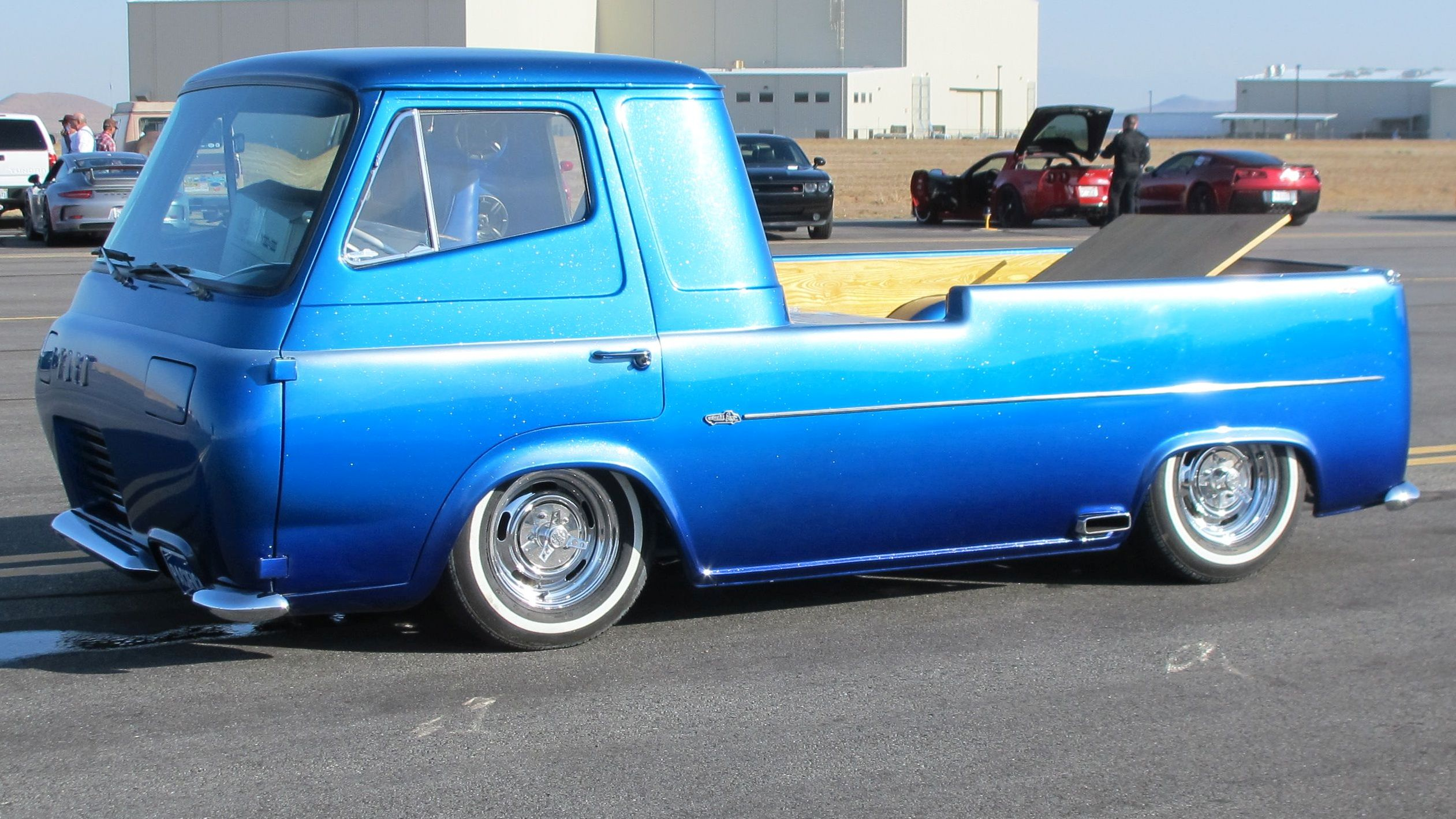
Gene's second copy of the Pacifica

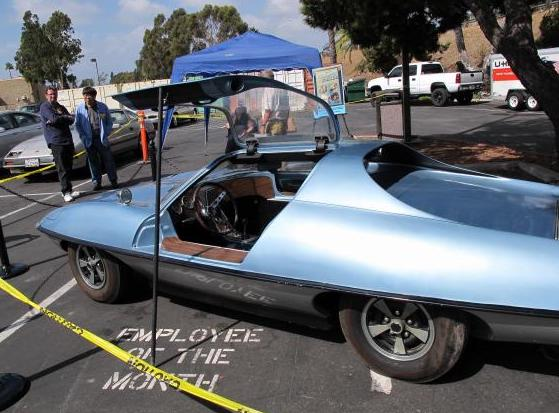
Piranha used in The Man from U.N.C.L.E. television program

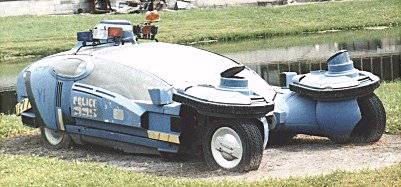
A spinner from Blade Runner

Winfield was born in Springfield, Missouri, in 1927. His family moved to Modesto, California, in 1929, where he grew up. He was first exposed to cars when his older brother, Glenn, opened a wrecking yard. In 1942, he bought his first car for $75, a 1928 Ford coupé, and promptly added a radio antenna with foxtail, despite it having no radio. Later that year, the brothers opened Winfield Used Cars in Modesto. His second car was a 1930 Ford, powered by a 1937 flathead.

Winfield served in the U.S. Navy from 1944 to 1945 and in the U.S. Army from 1949 to 1951. During his military service, he was stationed in Japan, where he made the acquaintance of a welder who taught him the trade.

== Career ==
In 1951, Winfield became interested in auto racing, driving 135 mph in a Ford Model T ("The Thing") at Bonneville Speedway. He soon opened Winfield's Custom Shop in Modesto, with an early innovation in custom painting, carefully fading two candy colors together, called "The Winfield Fade".

In 1962, building on his experience, Winfield joined Aluminum Model Toys (AMT) as a consultant style designer for their model kits.

Winfield also worked with Detroit automakers who turned to craftsmen to add their custom touches to factory cars. As part of the "Ford Custom Car Caravan", Winfield developed the Pacifica Ford Econoline van, the Mercury Comet Cyclone Sportster, and the Strip Star, an aluminum bodied sports car with a powerful 427 V8 engine.

The Reactor (1964) was Winfield's next aluminum-bodied project, and was even more ambitious. It was a mid-engined front wheel drive two seater, with a very low profile due to the Corvair Chevrolet Turbo-Air 6 engine flat six. It showcased a light aluminum body, like the Strip Star, but the technology went far beyond its novel bodywork. Winfield took the 180 hp (130 kW) turbocharged engine from a Corvair Corsa and mated it to the drivetrain from a Citroën DS, and retained the height adjustable Hydropneumatic suspension of the DS.

A January 1967 episode of Bewitched was written around The Reactor and its unique abilities. In 2017, The Reactor was shown at Pebble Beach.

AMT hired him in 1966 to manage the new Phoenix, Arizona based Speed and Custom Division Shop, which built full scale cars as promotional vehicles, including for Star Trek: The Original Series.

Winfield also used the Corvair Chevrolet Turbo-Air 6 engine in a more conventional Rear-engine, rear-wheel-drive layout, The Piranha, a car originally meant to show the usability of ABS plastic in automotive materials. Winfield began producing this car as a kit, and made it a television star as well, first appearing in March 1967 on The Man from U.N.C.L.E.

After AMT closed this division in 1971, Winfield continued work in the custom auto body field in Southern California and appears as an honored guest at auto related events in the US.

Winfeld was honored as the Detroit Autorama "Builder of the Year" in 2008, and since 2013, has been on the International Show Car Series (ISCA) circuit, chopping tops and shaping sheet metal for the crowds in a special section of each show called "The Summit Racing Equipment Chop Shop".

== Personal life and death ==
Winfield's marriages to Delores Johnson and Kathy Horrigan ended in divorce. He had four children: Two from his first marriage, one from his second, and one from another relationship.

On February 17, 2025, Winfield's Custom Shop announced on Instagram that Winfield had an unspecified form of cancer, which was later reported to be melanoma. He died from the disease at a care home in Atascadero, California, on March 4, 2025, at the age of 97.

== Filmography ==
Revered as "The King of Kustoms", Winfield was featured in the first DVD in a series called The Kings of Kustoms. The documentary series highlights various car customizers, such as VooDoo Larry from Chicago, Illinois, and Alex Gambino of San Jose, California.

Film
Year	Film	Vehicle	Notes
1973	Sleeper	Six bubbletop movie cars	Fiberglass body, 1969 VW Beetle chassis and engine
1982	Blade Runner	25 vehicles	Worked with Syd Mead on flying car concept
1984	The Last Starfighter	Starcar	Exists both as physical and computer-generated car
1985	Trancers		
1987	RoboCop	6000 SUX	
Television
Year	Title	Vehicle	Notes
1965	Get Smart	Sunbeam Tiger	Gadgets on car
1967	Bewitched	Reactor	"Super Car": Turbocharged Chevrolet Turbo-Air 6 engine, front wheel drive, Citroën DS chassis, aluminium body. episode 3.19
1967	Batman	Reactor	Catmobile (episode 110 and 111)
1967	Star Trek	Shuttlecraft Galileo	
1967	Star Trek	Reactor	"Jupiter 8" car from "Bread and Circuses"
1967	The Man from U.N.C.L.E.	Piranha	Chevrolet Turbo-Air 6 engine, plastic body
1968	Mission: Impossible	Reactor	Episode "The Freeze": used in a ploy to make a bank robber believe he's been in suspended animation for 14 years

== See also ==
- Concept car

== Sources ==
- Jonnie King's Hall Of Fame Legends Series: www.legends.thewwbc.net
