= Bread and Circuses (Star Trek: The Original Series) =

- Star Trek: The Original Series episode
- Episode no.: Season 2 Episode 25
- Directed by: Ralph Senensky
- Written by: Gene Roddenberry; Gene L. Coon
- Story by: Gene Roddenberry (uncredited)
- Cinematography by: Jerry Finnerman
- Production code: 043
- Original air date: March 15, 1968

Guest appearances
- William Smithers – Captain R.M. Merik / Mericus; Logan Ramsey – Proconsul Claudius Marcus; Ian Wolfe – Septimus; Rhodes Reason – Flavius; Lois Jewell – Drusilla; Bart Larue – Announcer; Jack Perkins – Master of Games; Max Kleven – Maximus; William Bramley – Policeman

Episode chronology
← Previous "The Ultimate Computer"	Next → "Assignment: Earth"
- Star Trek: The Original Series season 2

"Bread and Circuses" is the twenty-fifth and penultimate episode of the second season of the American science fiction television series Star Trek. Written by Gene Roddenberry and Gene L. Coon and directed by Ralph Senensky, it was first broadcast on March 15, 1968.

In the episode, Captain Kirk and his companions are forced to fight in gladiatorial games on a planet resembling the Roman Empire, but possessing mid-20th century Earth technology.

Its name is a reference to the phrase "bread and circuses" taken from the Satire X written by the poet Juvenal. In modern usage, the phrase implies a populace distracted from greater issues by the base pleasures of food and entertainment.

== Plot ==
The Federation starship USS Enterprise is on routine patrol when it finds the wreckage of a survey vessel, the SS Beagle. The Beagle was under the command of Captain R. M. Merik (William Smithers), whom Captain Kirk knew during his academy days. First Officer Spock traces the path of debris to a planet in the previously unexplored "System 892".

Upon arrival, the Enterprise crew monitors a 20th-century-style television broadcast from the planet showing footage of what appears to be a Roman gladiatorial match. The planet's culture is thus revealed to be a kind of 20th-century parallel to Earth's Ancient Rome. An announcer refers to one of the gladiators as William B. Harrison following his death; Spock identifies him from ship's records as one of the Beagle's flight officers.

Kirk, Spock and Dr. McCoy beam down to the planet to investigate. They are captured and brought before Septimus (Ian Wolfe), the leader of a group of escaped slaves, who asks them if they are "children of the Son". Septimus explains that he was a senator until he heard the "words of the Son" and was enslaved for heresy. Although his ally Flavius (Rhodes Reason) suggests killing the landing party, Septimus decides that they pose no threat.

Kirk reveals that he is looking for Captain Merik, who the slaves suggest is Mericus, the "First Citizen". Flavius, a former gladiator, is instructed by Septimus to help and leads Kirk and his party to the nearby city. They are soon captured and brought before Mericus, who reveals that he is Merik, and the proconsul Claudius Marcus (Logan Ramsey), who invites the landing party to sit and talk in private. Merik explains that the Beagle suffered damage and was forced to land for repairs; he relates that when he met Claudius Marcus and came to know his culture, he agreed that the planet should be protected from cultural contamination at all costs. Merik then handed over his own crew to either assimilate or be enslaved and forced to fight as gladiators (Harrison was called the "last of the barbarians"), while Merik himself assimilated and became Mericus. Merik and Marcus try to persuade Kirk to have the Enterprise crew abandon their ship and integrate into the planet's culture. Kirk refuses their demands and instead signals to Chief Engineer Scott, in code, that the landing party is in trouble, but that no rescue attempt should be made.

Angered, Marcus sends Spock and McCoy into the televised arena, forcing them to fight the recaptured Flavius alongside a native gladiator named Achilles. Spock overpowers Achilles and uses a Vulcan nerve pinch on Flavius, ending the fight to a hail of pre-recorded boos and hisses. Spock and McCoy are taken back to the slave pens(jail) while Kirk is sentenced to a televised execution scheduled for the next day by the TV Manager a.k.a. "Master of the Games". That evening, Kirk is brought to the Proconsul's home and given "some last hours as a man" with the slave girl Drusilla.

As the execution broadcast begins, Flavius is killed in a botched attempt to rescue Kirk; Kirk manages to kill the Master of the Games and two guards before Marcus sends the remaining guards to finish him; on the Enterprise, Scott uses the ship's tractor beams to cause a power blackout in the city, allowing Kirk to free Spock and McCoy. Merik has a change of heart and signals the Enterprise with a stolen communicator to beam up Kirk and party, for which he is fatally stabbed by Marcus. The landing party dematerializes just one second before the guards open fire with their submachine guns.

Back on the Enterprise, Spock expresses surprise at a sun-worshiping cult preaching universal brotherhood, opining that sun worship was primitive superstition, with no such philosophy behind it. Lt. Uhura, having monitored the planet's communications all this time, has the answer: "It's not the sun up in the sky. It's the Son of God." The Captain is astonished: "Caesar and Christ. They had them both. And the Word is spreading only now."

== Production ==
The submachine guns used by the Roman guards in the episode are Danish Madsen M-50 submachine guns.

Lois Jewell said in an interview that two costumes were made for her character, a grey slave outfit and the revealing evening wear she entertained Captain Kirk in. Of that she said, "That was a very exotic costume. It was made by the designer who designed everything for Star Trek. It wasn’t like they went, 'Well, let’s throw this on.' It was designed and it was made, and they had to make sure, in the fitting, that it fit properly. And I wore that. I still get a lot of comments when I’m at the Star Trek shows about that costume. Everybody talks about that costume."

The character Claudius Marcus wears the Shakespeare coat of arms on his costume, one of many examples of Shakespeare in Star Trek.

The Reactor, a car owned by American automotive customizer and fabricator Gene Winfield, was used in the opening and called the Jupiter 8.

== Reception ==
In 2013, W.I.R.E.D. magazine ranked this episode one of the top ten most underrated episodes of the original television series.

A 2018 Star Trek binge-watching guide by Den of Geek recommended this episode as one of the best of the original series.
