= Chevrolet Lakewood =

Chevrolet Corvair Lakewood
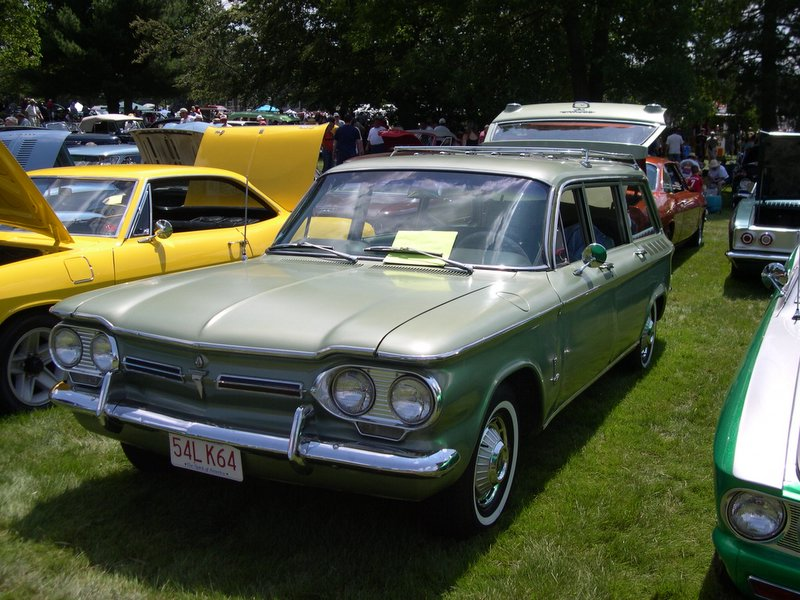
- 1962 Chevrolet Corvair wagon shown. 1961 Corvair Lakewood is similar.

Overview
- Manufacturer: Chevrolet (General Motors)
- Production: 1961 Corvair Lakewood, 1962 Corvair Wagon
- Model years: 1961 Corvair Lakewood, 1962 Corvair Wagon
- Assembly: United States: Ypsilanti, Michigan (Willow Run Assembly); United States: Kansas City, Missouri (Leeds Assembly); United States: Oakland, California (Oakland Assembly); United States: Van Nuys (Van Nuys Assembly); United States: St. Louis (St. Louis Truck Assembly); United States: Flint, Michigan (Flint Truck Assembly); Canada: Oshawa (Oshawa Car Assembly); Argentina: Buenos Aires (CKD); Mexico: Mexico City (CKD); Venezuela: Caracas (CKD); Switzerland: Bienne (CKD); Belgium: Antwerp (CKD); South Africa: Port Elizabeth (CKD)

Body and chassis
- Class: Compact car
- Layout: RR layout
- Related: Chevrolet Corvair

Powertrain
- Engine: Flat-six

Dimensions
- Wheelbase: 108 in (2,743.2 mm)

The Chevrolet Corvair Lakewood is a four-door station wagon produced by Chevrolet for the 1961 model year. Chevrolet dropped the "x-wood" names for their station wagon models at the end of 1961 so the 1962 Corvair Station wagons do not continue the Lakewood name. In appearance, and technical respects it resembled the Volkswagen Type 3 Squareback, but power came from the Corvair's rear-mounted Chevrolet Turbo-Air 6 engine with 145 cu.in. displacement which developed 80 bhp (60 kW) at 4,400 rpm. The station wagon Corvairs were built on the same unibody as other sedan Corvairs with a 108 in. wheelbase. Standard transmission was a 3-speed manually shifted transaxle.

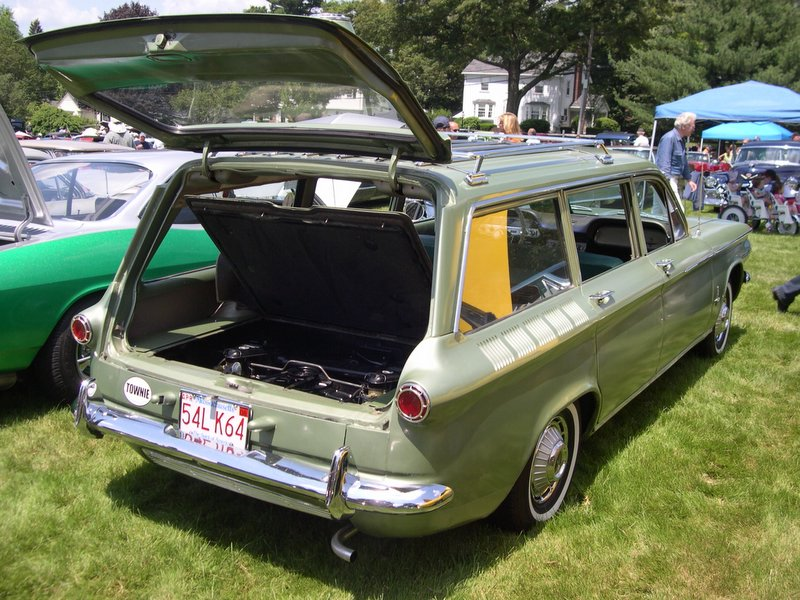
Rear end of the 1962 Corvair wagon. 1961 Corvair Lakewood is similar.

In 1961 the Lakewood was available in base form as part of the Corvair Lakewood 500 and an "upscale" trim form as the Lakewood 700. In 1962 the base trim level was called Corvair Deluxe series 700 and the top-of-the line model was the Corvair Monza series 900. The Series 900's powertrain "uni-pak" was the same as all Corvairs. A commonly ordered option on Corvair Station Wagons was the 84 bhp engine connected to a 2 speed Powerglide automatic transaxle.

Production of the Corvair Station Wagon ended in the 1st quarter of calendar year 1962 to make way for the new Monza Convertible body style. In two years 32,120 Station Wagons were made. Only 2,362 of them (model year 1962 only) were Monza Station Wagon models. The 1961 Lakewood 700 was most popular with 20,451 made (64% of all Station Wagons produced).

All 1961 Corvairs came in one of 15 available paint colors. All 1961 Station Wagons had a rubber floor covering with the 700 series having it color keyed to the interior. The Monza 900 series was available with optional (extra cost) bucket seats. The upscale Monza series included carpeting and bright trim in the interior. Many options were available for the Station Wagon models as they were for the Corvair Sedan. This included 4-speed transmission, more powerful engine, and comfort and convenience options as well.
