= Chevrolet Corvair =

General Motors compact car (1960–1969)

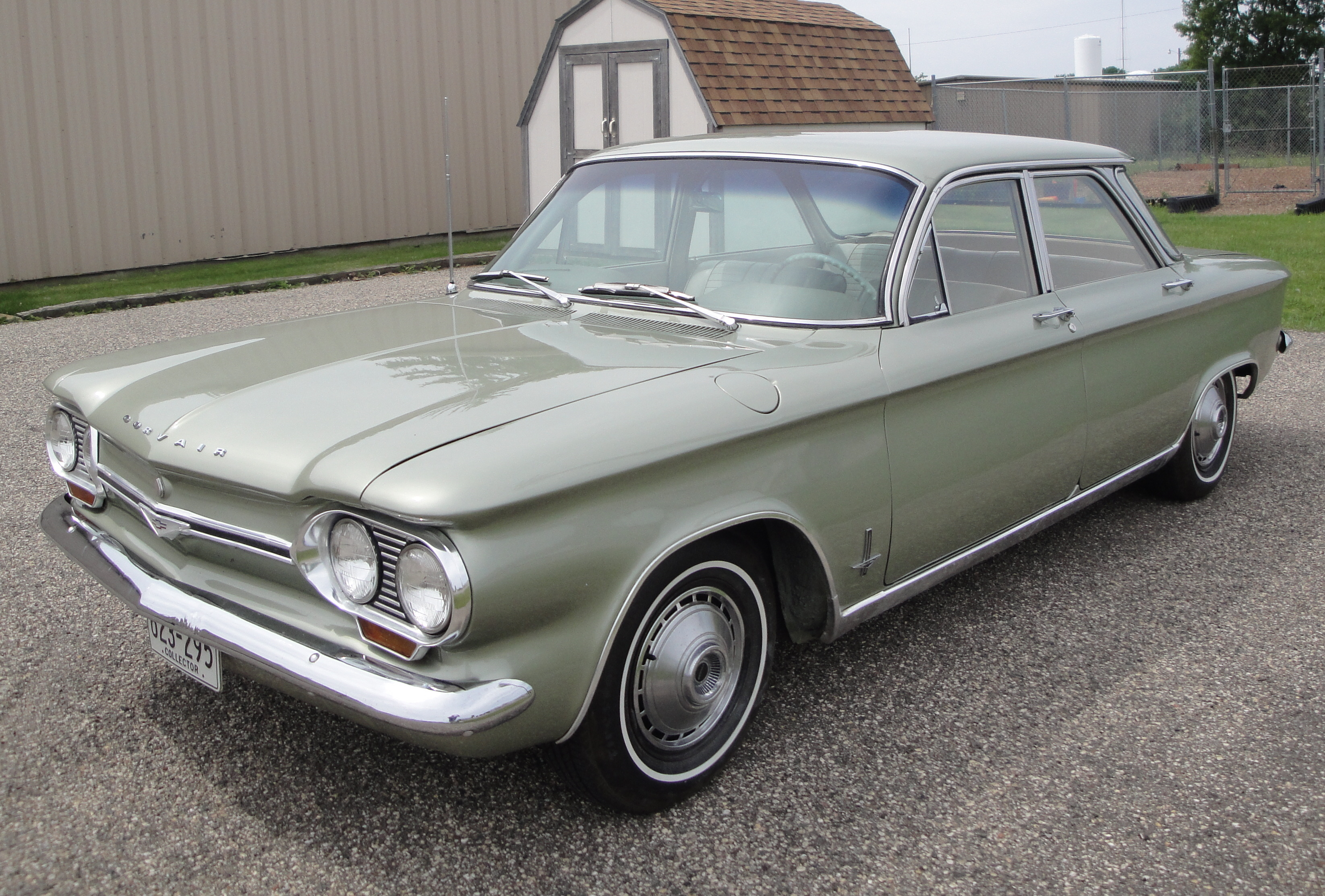
- 1964 Chevrolet Corvair Monza

Overview
- Manufacturer: Chevrolet (General Motors)
- Production: July 1959–May 14, 1969
- Model years: 1960–1969
- Assembly: United States: Ypsilanti, Michigan (Willow Run Assembly); Kansas City, Missouri (Leeds Assembly); Oakland, California (Oakland Assembly); Van Nuys (Van Nuys Assembly); St. Louis (St. Louis Truck Assembly); Flint, Michigan (Flint Truck Assembly); Belgium: Antwerp (CKD); Canada: Oshawa (Oshawa Car Assembly); Mexico: Mexico City (CKD); South Africa: Port Elizabeth (CKD); Switzerland: Bienne (CKD); Venezuela: Caracas (CKD)

Body and chassis
- Class: Compact car
- Layout: RR layout
- Platform: Z-body
- Chassis: Unibody

Chronology
- Successor: Chevrolet Vega

The Chevrolet Corvair is a rear-engined, air-cooled compact car manufactured and marketed by Chevrolet over two generations from the 1960 through 1969 model years. The Corvair was a response to the increasing popularity of small, fuel-efficient automobiles, particularly the imported Volkswagen Beetle and American-built compacts like the Rambler American and Studebaker Lark.

The first generation (1960–1964) was offered in four-door sedan, two-door coupe, convertible, and four-door station wagon configurations. A two- and four-door hardtop, as well as a convertible, were available as second-generation variants (1965–1969). The Corvair platform was also offered as a subseries known as the Corvair 95 (1961–1965), which consisted of a passenger van, commercial van, and pickup truck variant. Total production was approximately 1.8 million vehicles from 1960 until 1969.

The name "Corvair" was first applied in 1954 to a Corvette-based concept with a hardtop fastback-styled roof, part of the Motorama traveling exhibition. When applied to the production models, the "air" suffix referenced the engine's cooling system.

A prominent aspect of the Corvair's legacy derived from controversy surrounding the handling of early models equipped with rear swing axles, which activist Ralph Nader argued was dangerous in his book Unsafe at Any Speed. Nader's claims earned significant publicity, but a 1972 report, by Texas A&M University on behalf of the National Highway Traffic Safety Administration (NHTSA), found that the 1960–1963 Corvair possessed no greater potential for loss of control in extreme situations than contemporary compacts.

To better counter popular inexpensive subcompact competitors, especially the Beetle and Japanese imports such as the Datsun 510, GM replaced the Corvair with the more conventional Chevrolet Vega in 1970.

== Development ==
The development of the Chevrolet Corvair in the late 1950s is an unconventional chapter in American automotive history, driven by shifting market dynamics and visionary leadership. Ed Cole, a pivotal figure at General Motors, was promoted to chief engineer of the Chevrolet Motor Division in 1952. Four years later, in July 1956, he ascended to the role of general manager of Chevrolet, GM's largest automotive division, and became a GM vice president. Cole was a driving force behind many significant engineering and design advancements introduced across Chevrolet's car and truck lines between 1955 and 1962. His influence extended to the Corvette sports car as well as the development and production of the air-cooled, rear-engine Corvair. He is also widely recognized as the "father" of the small-block Chevy V8. Chevrolet had experimented with an air-cooled engine in 1923 with the Chevrolet Series M Copper-Cooled; however, that venture was deemed a failure due to engineering challenges.

By the late 1950s, the physical size of the entry-level models offered by the "Big Three" American domestic auto manufacturers (General Motors, Ford, and Chrysler) had grown considerably. This expansion effectively abandoned the market segment for smaller, more economical vehicles that had previously been available. However, a successful modern "compact car" market segment had already been firmly established in the U.S. by the 1950 Nash Rambler. Concurrently, growing sales of European imports, such as Volkswagen, Renault, Fiat, and others, clearly demonstrated a burgeoning demand in the U.S. market for small cars, often serving as a second vehicle or an affordable alternative for budget-minded consumers.

While the "Big Three" continued introducing ever-larger cars throughout the 1950s, the newly formed American Motors Corporation (AMC) adopted a contrasting business strategy. Years before a widespread perceived need for them existed, AMC strategically focused on smaller-sized and fuel-efficient automobiles. As a far smaller company than any of the "Big Three," AMC positioned itself as an underdog. Its compact Rambler models proved highly successful, helping to propel AMC to third place in domestic automobile sales. American Motors further capitalized on this trend by reintroducing its predecessor company's smallest Nash model as the "new" 1958 Rambler American for a second model run—an almost unheard-of phenomenon in automotive history. In 1959, Studebaker followed AMC's successful formula by restyling its mainstream economy-model sedan, rebranding it as the Lark and marketing it as a compact. The Lark's initial success gave Studebaker a reprieve for several years before the company ultimately ceased automobile production in 1966.

In response to these market shifts and the success of the independents, the "Big Three" automakers began planning their own "compact" cars for the 1960 model year. Ford and Chrysler's designs, such as the Ford Falcon and Plymouth Valiant, were scaled-down versions of conventional American cars, utilizing industry-standard inline six-cylinder engines and bodies approximately 20% smaller than their full-size counterparts.

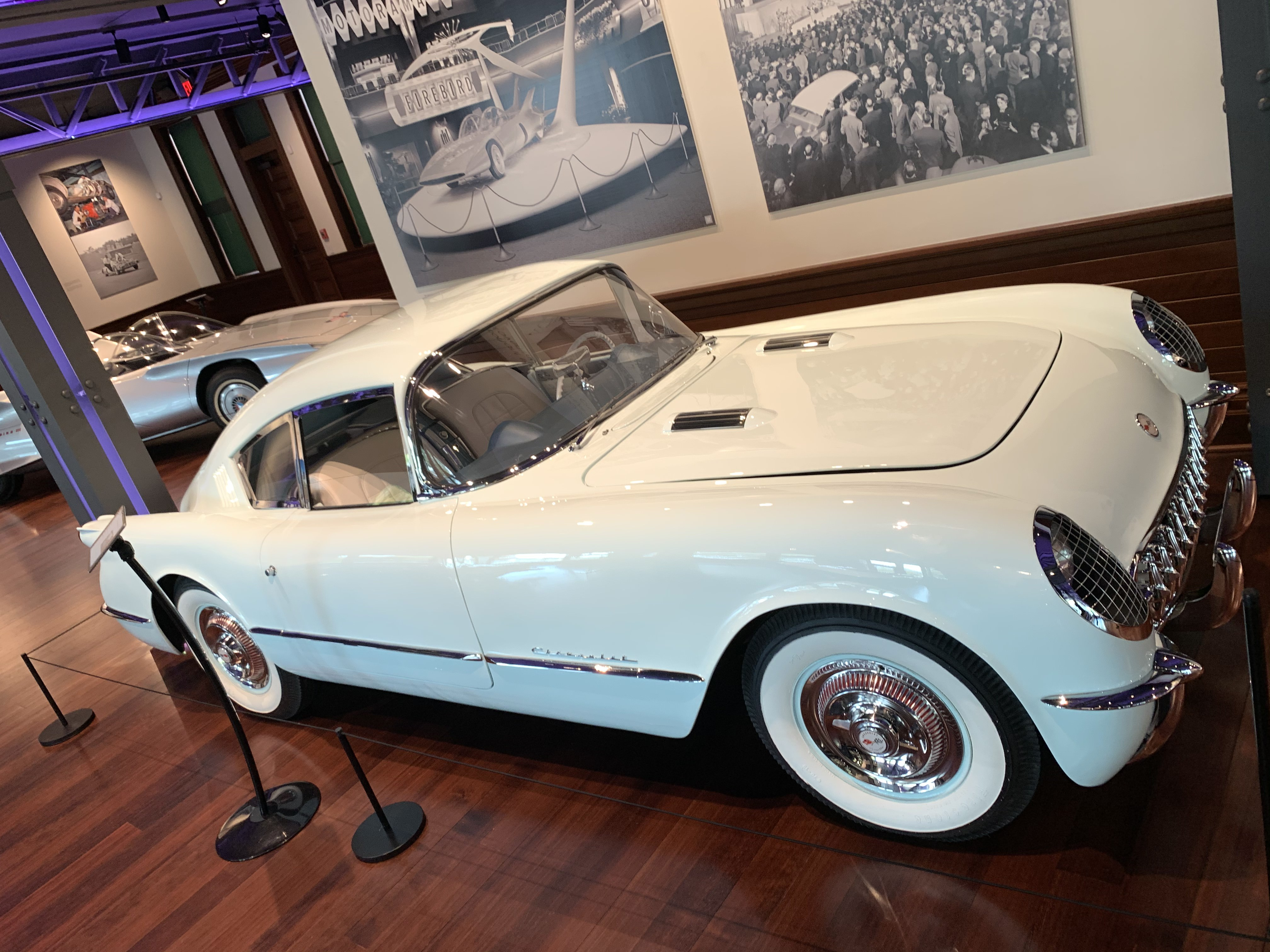
First use of Corvair name was the 1954 Chevrolet Corvair concept car styled as a fastback

General Motors, however, took a radically different approach with the Chevrolet Corvair. The initial production began July 1959 in a new Chevrolet Corvair Assembly Plant at Willow Run using an overhead assembly conveyor system. General Motors registered the name "Corvair" for use on automobiles on August 6, 1959. This followed its earlier use on a 1954 concept car, the Chevrolet Corvair, which featured a distinctive fastback styled after the Chevrolet Corvette. The official launch of the Corvair was October 2, 1959.

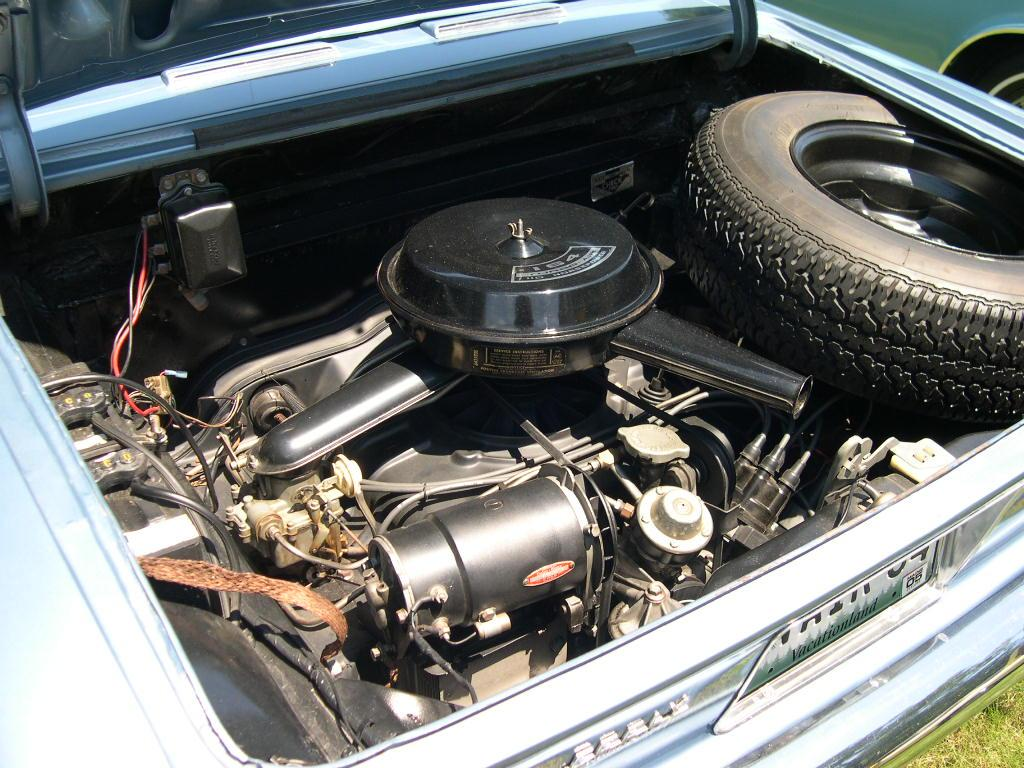
The Corvair's air-cooled rear-mounted flat-six engine

The production Corvair was a significant departure from traditional American automotive design norms. It was an exception to the strategy of simply downsizing conventional cars. Its engineering was highly unconventional for Detroit at the time:

- It was powered by an air-cooled, horizontally opposed flat-six engine, with many major components constructed from aluminum. This marked Chevrolet's second attempt at an air-cooled engine.
- The engine was mounted in the car's rear, driving the rear wheels through a compact transaxle.
- It featured independent suspension on all four wheels, a rarity for mass-produced American cars of the era.
- It utilized unibody construction rather than the traditional body-on-frame method.
- The car was equipped with a wider, low-profile tire design mounted on wider wheels, contributing to its unique handling characteristics.
- Its clean, boxy styling was unconventional for Detroit, notably lacking the prevalent tail fins and a grille.

The Corvair's innovative engineering earned numerous patents and was highly praised and warmly received upon its introduction and for some time thereafter. While the Corvair was under development, a Pontiac version, named Polaris, was proposed. The General Motors Styling Studios built several full-size mockups. However, the project did not proceed beyond the styling markup phase, as Pontiac division chief John Z. DeLorean expressed suspicion regarding its air-cooled rear engine and drivetrain.

=== Reception ===
Time magazine featured Ed Cole and the 1960 Corvair on its cover for the Corvair introduction in 1959, and Motor Trend named the Corvair as the 1960 "Car of the Year".

The Time article described "its fresh engineering is hailed as the forerunner of a new age of innovation in Detroit." Chevrolet sold 26,000 Corvairs its first two days on the market, taking over 35% of Chevy's two-day total of 75,000. Chevrolet had intended to sell one Corvair for every five Chevrolets. By March 1960, the Corvair comprised 13% of Chevrolet's sales. Shortly after its introduction, the Corvair faced competition from the Ford Falcon and Mercury Comet and was plagued by problems, although according to a 1960 Time report, "many were the minor bugs that often afflict a completely new car." Problems included an engine cooling fan belt that tended to pop off its 2-axis pulleys (unless the fan ran constantly, the air-cooled engine would overheat and seize), carburetor icing and poor fuel mileage "which sometimes runs well under 20 m.p.g." The 1960 model gasoline heater was cited as a problem, which itself could consume up to a quart of gas an hour – with Chevrolet engineers quickly modifying the Corvair's carburetors to improve economy.

== Generations ==
=== Overview ===
The Corvair was sold in two generations, the first from 1960 to 1964, the second from 1965 to 1969. It sold more than 200,000 units in each of its first six model years, and 1,835,170 in all.

Chevrolet positioned the under $2,000 car as an economy compact, and highlighted its rear-engine design, which offered a low silhouette, flat passenger compartment floor, and spacious interior. There was excellent traction, no need for power-assisted steering or brakes, good ride quality, and balanced braking. The design also attracted customers of other makes, primarily imports. The Corvair stood out, being larger, more powerful, and offering more features than comparable imports, and engineering unique from other American offerings. It used GM's Z-body, with design and engineering that advanced the rear-engine/rear-wheel-drive layout, which at the time had recently been popularized by the exploding success of the Volkswagen Beetle.

The Corvair's engine was an overhead-valve aluminum, air-cooled 80 hp (60 kW; 81 PS) 140 cu in (2.3 L) flat-six, later enlarged, first to 145 cubic inches (2.4 L) and then to 164 cubic inches (2.7 L). Power peaked with the 1965–66 turbocharged 180 hp (134 kW; 182 PS) Corsa engine option. The first generation model's swing axle rear suspension, which offered a comfortable ride. The design was replaced in 1965 model year with a fully independent trailing arm rear suspension similar to that of the Corvette Sting Ray.

=== First generation (1960–1964) ===
==== 1960 ====
Corvair Series 500 Corvair Deluxe Series 700 Corvair Monza Series 900
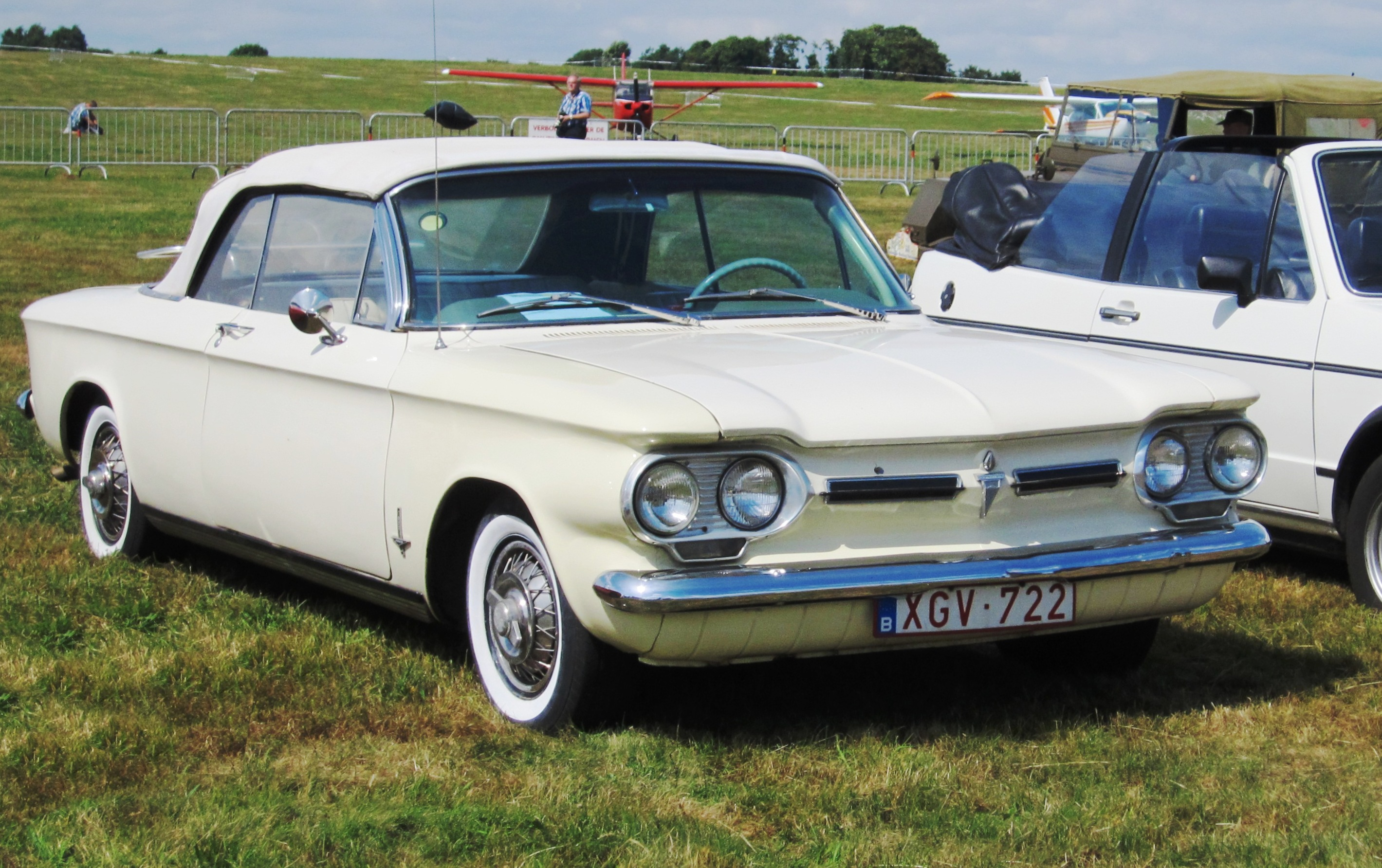
- 1962 Chevrolet Corvair Monza convertible

Overview
- Production: 1959–1964
- Model years: 1960–1964
- Designer: Ned Nickles, Carl Renner

Body and chassis
- Class: Compact car
- Body style: 2-door convertible; 2-door coupe; 4-door sedan; 4-door station wagon
- Layout: RR layout
- Related: Chevrolet Corvair 95

Powertrain
- Engine: 2,296 cc (2.3 L) air-cooled flat 6 engine; 2,375 cc (2.4 L) Flat-six (1961–63); 2,683 cc (2.7 L) Flat-six (1964)
- Transmission: Three-speed manual; Four-speed manual; Two-speed Corvair Powerglide automatic

Dimensions
- Wheelbase: 108 in (2,743 mm)
- Length: 180 in (4,572 mm)
- Width: 66.9 in (1,699 mm)
- Curb weight: 2,270–2,305 pounds (1,030–1,046 kg)

The 1960 Corvair Body Styles 569 and 769 four-door sedans were conceived as economy cars offering few amenities to keep the price competitive, with the 500 Series selling for $2,038 ($22,180 in 2025 dollars). Powered by the Chevrolet Turbo-Air 6 engine with 80 hp (60 kW) and mated to a three-speed manual or optional extra-cost two-speed Powerglide automatic transmission (RPO 360), the Corvair was designed to have comparable acceleration to the six-cylinder full-sized Chevrolet Biscayne. The Corvair's unique design included the "Quadri-Flex" independent suspension and "Unipack Power Team" of engine, transmission, and rear axle combined into a single unit. Similar to designs of European cars such as Porsche, Volkswagen, Mercedes-Benz, and others, "Quadri-Flex" used coil springs at all four wheels with independent rear suspension arms incorporated at the rear. Specially designed 6.5 by 13-inch four-ply tires mounted on 5.5 by 13 inch wheels were standard equipment. Available options included RPO 360, the Powerglide two-speed automatic transmission ($146), RPO 118, a gasoline heater ($74), RPO 119, an AM tube radio ($54), and by February 1960, the rear folding seat (formerly $32) was made standard. Chevrolet produced 47,683 of the 569 model and 139,208 769 model deluxe sedans in 1960.

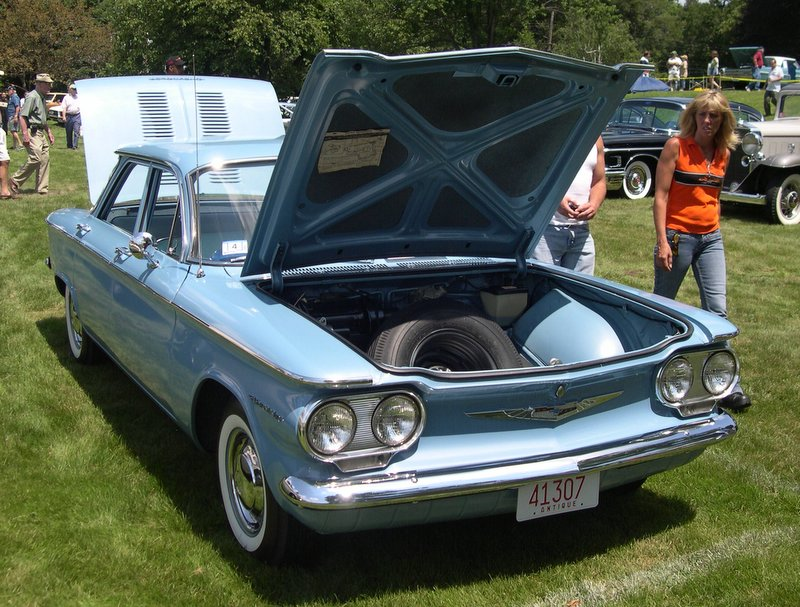
1960 Chevrolet Corvair

In January 1960 two-door coupe models were introduced designated as the 527 and 727 body styles. Despite their late January introduction of the coupe, these cars sold well; about 14,628 base model 527 coupes, 36,562 model 727 deluxe coupes. Following the success of the upmarket "Mr. and Mrs. Monza" styling concept cars at the 1960 Chicago Auto Show, management approved the neatly appointed bucket-seat DeLuxe trim of the 900 series Monza as a two-door club coupe only. The new Monza began arriving at Chevrolet dealers in April 1960 with sales of 11,926 Monza club coupes, making the coupe one of the most popular Corvairs.

The success of the Monza model showed Chevrolet management that the compact Corvair was viewed as more of a specialty car than a competitor in the economy segment to the conventionally designed Ford Falcon or Chrysler's Valiant. Chevrolet began a design program that resulted in the 1962 Chevy II, a conventional layout compact.

The option of a more powerful engine for the Corvair was introduced in February 1960. The RPO 649, marketed as "Super Turbo Air", included a hotter camshaft, revised dual-spring cylinder heads, and a lower restriction 2-inch muffler to deliver 95 hp (71 kW) at 4,800 rpm and 125 lb⋅ft (169 N⋅m) of torque at 2,800 rpm. In its first year, it was available on any Corvair model with a manual transmission.

The advertised February introduction of a full synchromesh, four-speed transmission (RPO 651) was postponed until the 1961 model year. This was due to casting problems with the aluminum three-speed transmission case which resulted in technical service bulletins to dealers advising of the potential for differential failure due to external leaks at the front of the transmission's counter gear shaft. The revision of the four-speed transmission designated for 1961 introduction incorporated a cast-iron case and a redesign of the differential pinion shaft to interface with a longer transmission output shaft and a concentric pilot for the revised transmission case. These are among many of the improvements undertaken by Chevrolet by the end of the 1960 model year.

The Corvair was Motor Trend magazine's Car of the Year for 1960.

==== 1961 ====
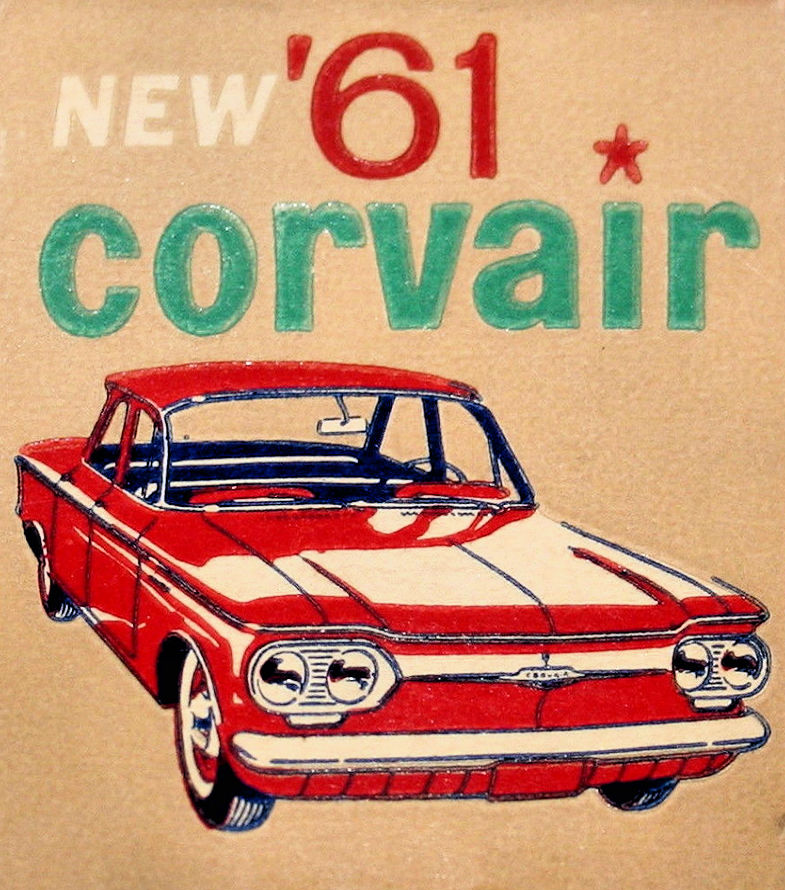
1961 matchbook cover art

In 1961, Chevrolet introduced the Monza upscale trim to the four-door sedans and the club coupe body styles. With its newly introduced four-speed floor-mounted transmission, DeLuxe vinyl bucket seats, and upscale trim, the Monza Club Coupe gained in sales, as nearly 110,000 were produced along with 33,745 Monza four-door sedans. The four-speed Monza caught the attention of the younger market and was sometimes referred to as "the poor man's Porsche" in various car magazines. The Monza series contributed to about half of the Corvair sales in 1961.

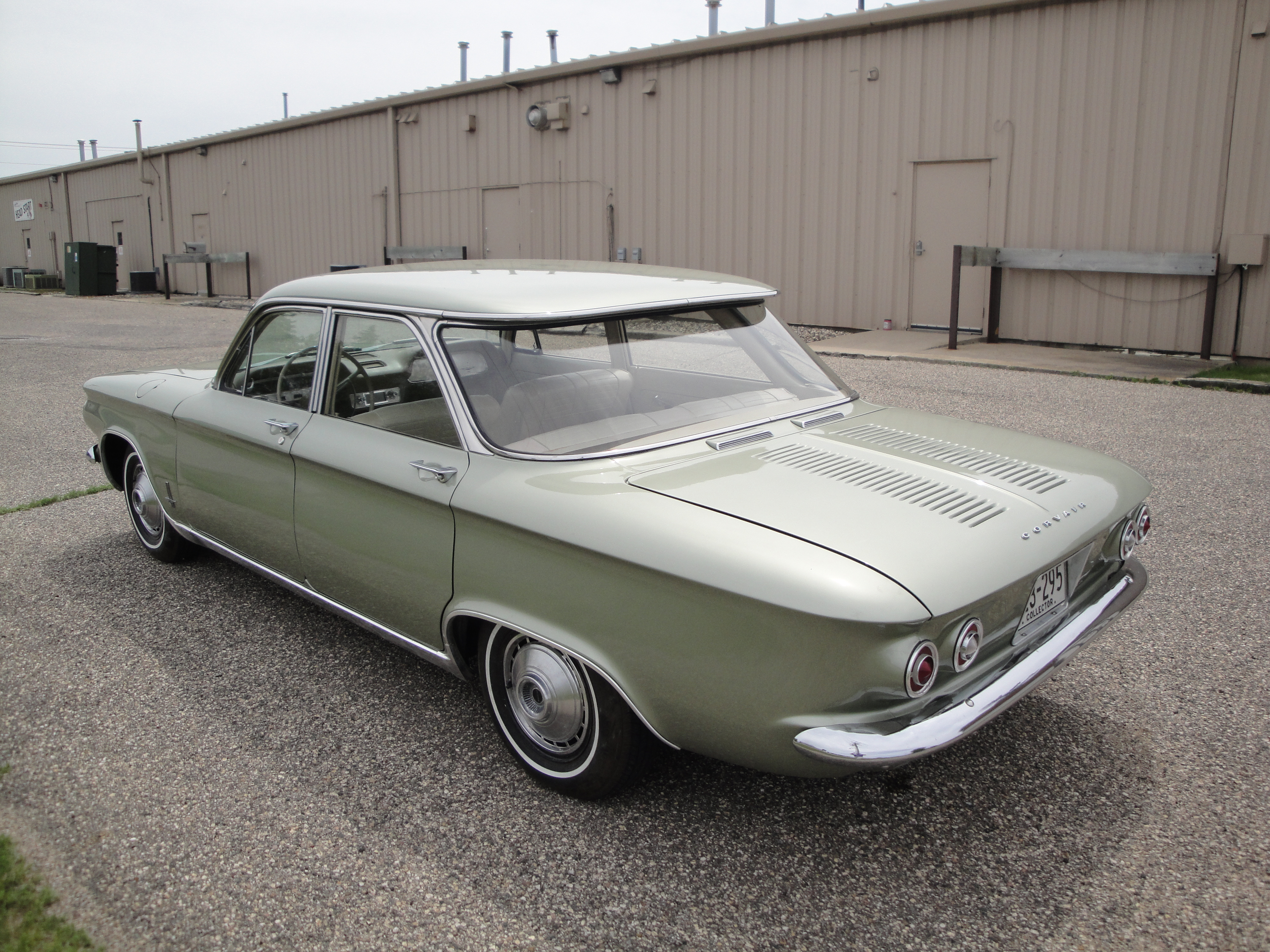
1964 Corvair Monza rear

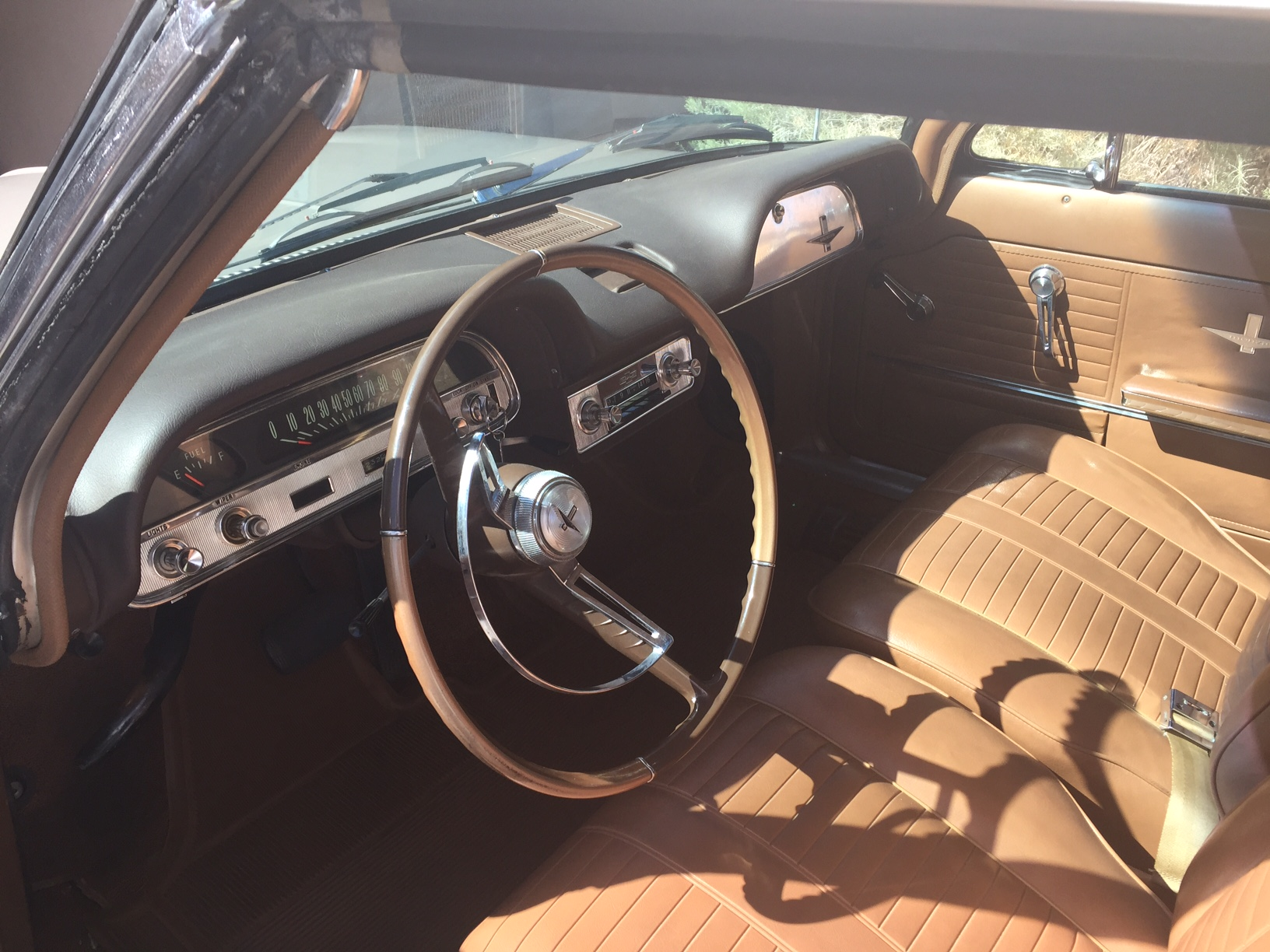
1964 Corvair Monza Interior

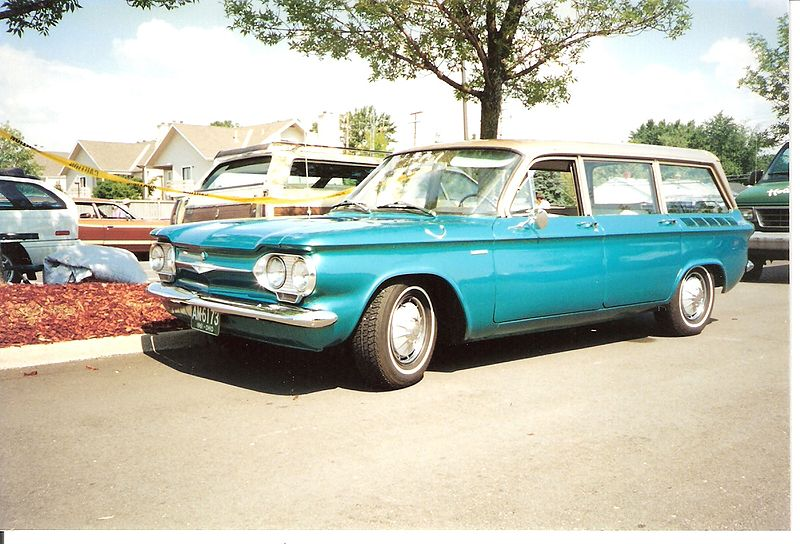
1961 Corvair 500 Lakewood station wagon

A station wagon, marketed as the Lakewood, joined the lineup in 1961 with its engine located under the cargo floor and offering 68 ft^{3} (1.9 m^{3}) of cargo room; 58 ft^{3} in the main passenger compartment, and another 10 ft^{3} in the front trunk. The Corvair engine received its first size increase to 145 cu in (2.4 L) via a slight increase in bore size and was rated at 98 hp (73 kW). The base engine was still rated at 80 hp (60 kW) when paired with the manual transmissions but this increased to 84 hp (63 kW) when mated to the optional automatic transmission in Monza models. To increase luggage capacity in the front trunk, the spare tire was relocated to the engine compartment (in cars without air conditioning) and new "direct air" heater directed warmed air from the cylinders and heads to the passenger compartment. The gasoline heater remained available as an option through 1963. Factory air conditioning was offered as a mid-1961 option introduction. The condenser lay flat atop the horizontal engine fan. A large, green-painted reverse rotation version of the standard GM Frigidaire air-conditioning compressor was used, and an evaporator housing was added under the dash with integrated outlets surrounding the radio housing. Air conditioning was not available on wagons, Greenbrier/Corvair 95, or the turbocharged models introduced later, due to space constraints. Chevrolet also introduced the Corvair 95 line of light-duty trucks and vans, using the Corvair Powerpack with forward-control, or "cab over", with the driver sitting over the front wheels, as in the Volkswagen Type 2.

The Greenbrier Sportswagon used the same body as the "Corvan 95" panel van with the side windows option, but was marketed as a station wagon and was available with trim and paint options similar to the passenger cars. The "Corvan 95" model was also built in pickup versions; the Loadside was a fairly typical pickup of the era, except for the rear engine, forward controls, and a pit in the middle of the bed. The more popular Rampside had a unique, large, fold-down ramp on the side of the bed for ease of loading wheeled items.

==== 1962 ====
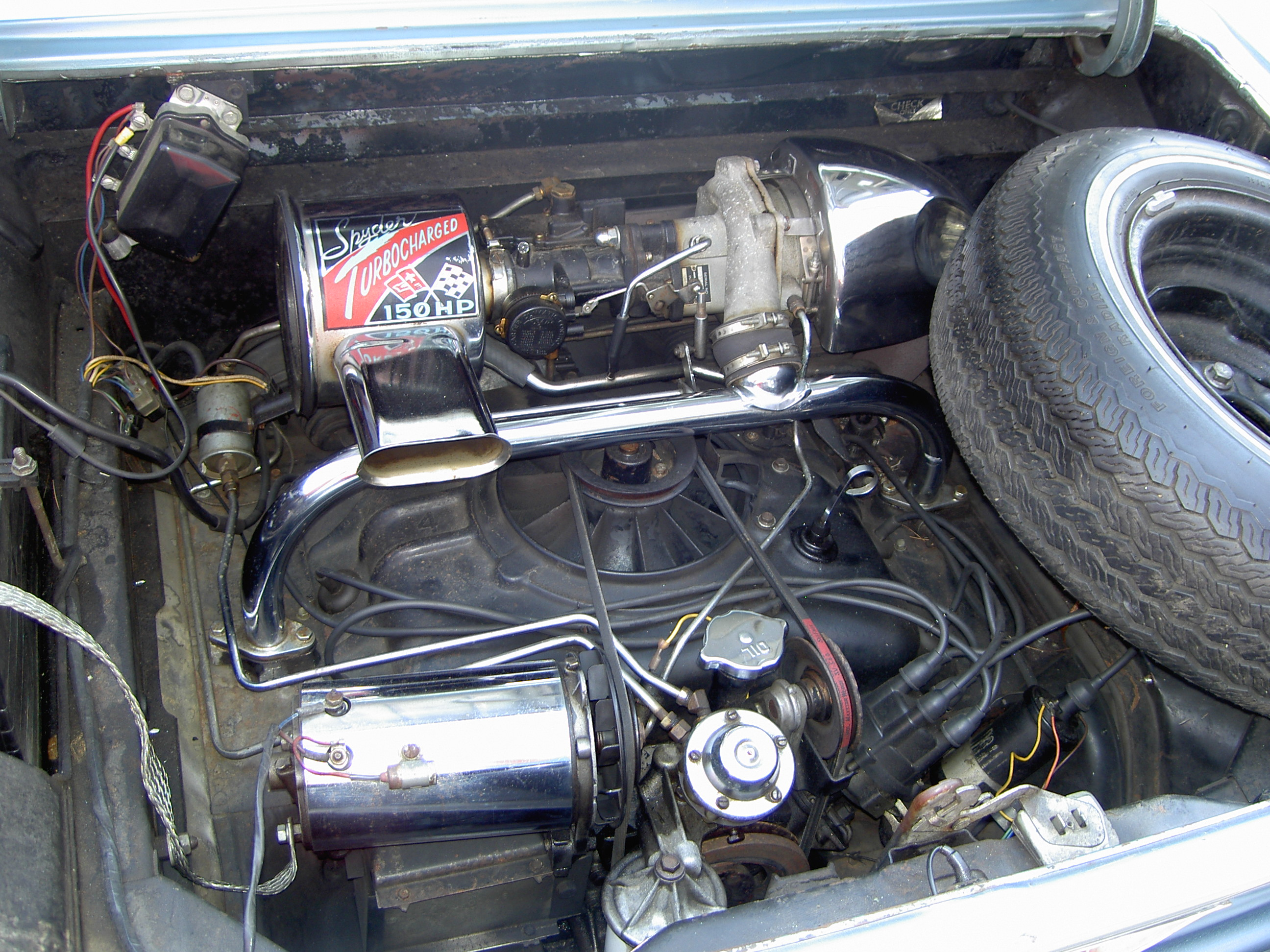
The Corvair Spyder turbocharged engine

1962 Corvair advertisement

In 1962, Chevrolet introduced the Corvairs with few changes at the beginning of the year. The bottom line 500 series station wagon was dropped and the 700 became the base station wagon. The "Lakewood" name was dropped. The ever-popular Monza line then took on a wagon model to round out the top of the line. In spring of 1962, Chevrolet committed itself to the sporty image they had created for the Corvair by introducing a convertible version, then offering a high-performance 150 hp (112 kW) turbocharged "Spyder" option for Monza coupes and convertibles, making the Corvair the second production automobile supplied with a turbocharger as a factory option, with the Oldsmobile F-85 Turbo Jetfire having been released earlier in 1962. Corvair station wagons were discontinued at that point in favor the new Corvair Convertible and Chevy II (built at the same assembly plant). The slow-selling Loadside pickup was discontinued at the end of the model year. The rest of the Corvair 95 line of Forward Control vehicles continued. Optional equipment on all passenger cars (except wagons) included metallic brake linings and a heavy-duty suspension consisting of a front anti-roll bar, rear-axle limit straps, revised spring rates, and recalibrated shock absorbers. These provided a major handling improvement by reducing the potentially violent camber change of the rear wheels when making sharp turns at high speeds. The Turbocharged Spyder equipment group featured a multi-gauge instrument cluster which included a tachometer, cylinder head temperature, and intake manifold pressure gauges, Spyder fender script, and Turbo logo deck emblems, in addition to the high-performance engine.

The Monza Coupe was the most popular model with 151,738 produced out of 292,531 total Corvair passenger car production for 1962. John Fitch, chose the Corvair as the basis for "Sprint" models. These included various performance improvements along with appearance modifications. Individual components were available to customers and several Chevrolet dealers became authorized to install the "Sprint" conversions.

==== 1963 ====
The 1963 model year had the optional availability of a long 3.08 gear for improved fuel economy, but the Corvair otherwise remained largely carryover with minor trim and engineering changes. Self-adjusting brakes were new for 1963. Of all the Corvairs sold in 1963, fully 80% were Monzas. The convertible model accounted for over 20% of all the Monzas sold.

==== 1964 ====
Significant engineering changes were introduced for 1964, while the model lineup and styling remained relatively unchanged. The engine displacement was increased from 145 to 164 cu in (2.4 to 2.7 L) by an increase in stroke. The base engine power increased from 80 to 95 hp (60 to 71 kW), and the high-performance engine increased from 102 to 110 hp (76 to 82 kW). The Spyder engine rating remained at 150 hp (112 kW) despite the displacement increase of the engine. In 1964, an improvement in the car's swing axle rear suspension occurred with the addition of a transverse leaf spring along with softer rear coil springs designed to diminish rear roll stiffness and foster more neutral handling. Spring rates could now be softer at both ends of the car compared to previous models. The heavy-duty suspension was no longer optional, although all models now had a front anti-roll bar as standard. Brakes were improved with finned rear drums. The remaining pickup, the Rampside, was discontinued at the end of the model year.

Despite a vastly improved 1964 model, Corvair sales declined by close to 73,000 units that year. This was attributed to the basic styling being 5 years old, the lack of a pillarless hardtop (which virtually all competing compact models had), the lack of a V8 engine, and the introduction of the Ford Mustang on 17 April, which broke all records for sales of a new car (and cut into Corvair sales).

=== Second generation (1965–1969) ===
==== 1965 ====
Corvair 500 Series 101 Corvair Monza Series 105 Corvair Corsa Series 107
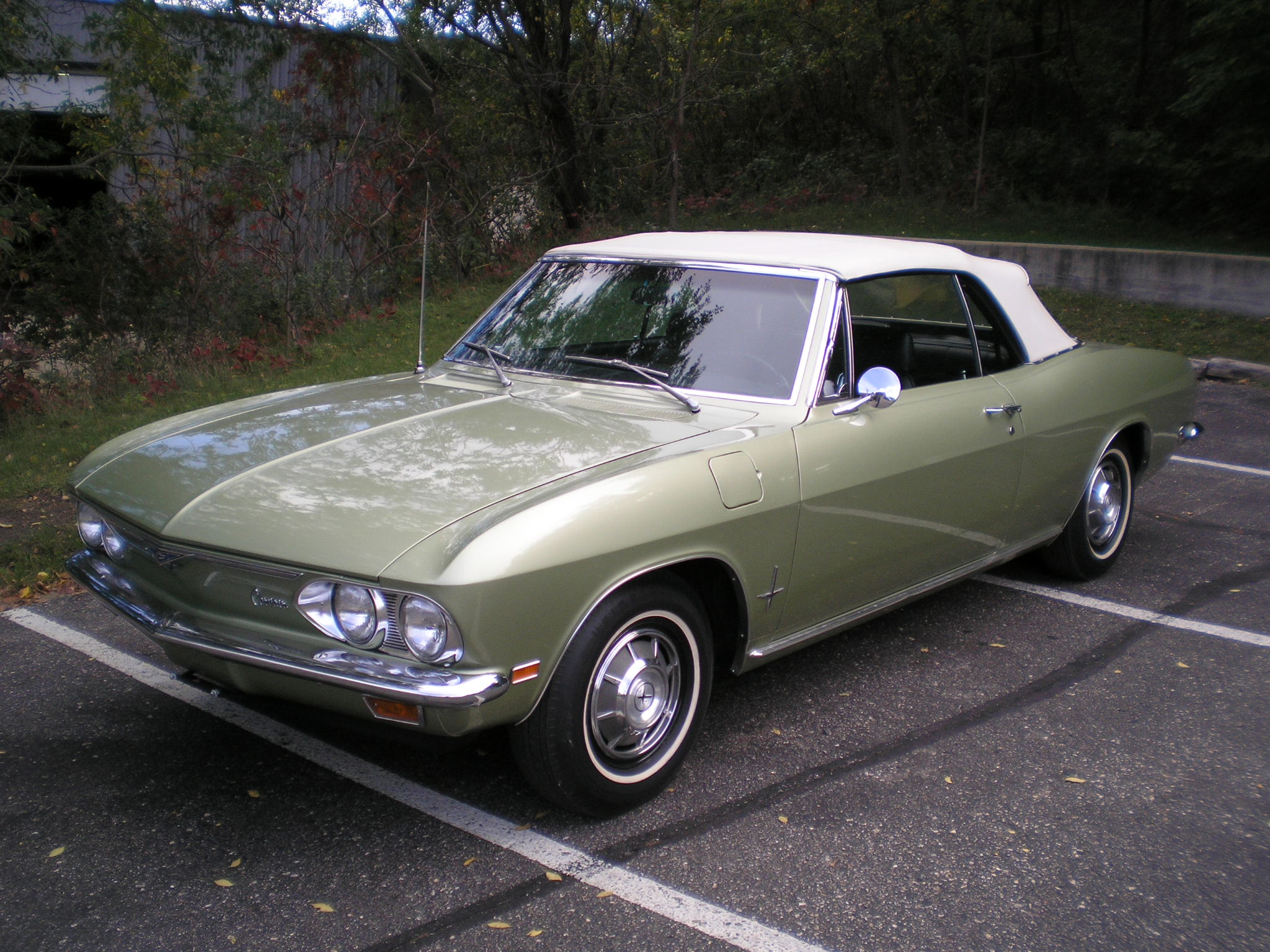
- 1969 Chevrolet Corvair Monza convertible

Overview
- Production: 1964–1969
- Model years: 1965–1969
- Designer: Ron Hill

Body and chassis
- Class: Compact car
- Body style: 2-door convertible; 2-door hardtop; 4-door hardtop (1965–67)
- Layout: RR layout
- Related: Chevrolet Corvair 95

Powertrain
- Engine: 2,683 cc (2.7 L) air-cooled flat 6 engine
- Transmission: 3-speed manual; 4-speed manual; 2-speed Corvair Powerglide automatic

Dimensions
- Wheelbase: 108 in (2,743 mm)
- Length: 183.3 in (4,656 mm)
- Width: 69.7 in (1,770 mm)
- Height: 52.8 in (1,341 mm)
- Curb weight: 2,385–2,770 pounds (1,082–1,256 kg)

The Corvair second generation arrived for model year 1965. It lacked a "B" pillar and had a new fully independent suspension replacing the original swing axle rear suspension. The Corvair used coil springs at each wheel.

Car and Driver magazine's David E. Davis Jr. showed enthusiasm for the 1965 Corvair in their October 1964 issue:

And it is here too, that we have to go on record and say that the Corvair is in our opinion—the most important new car of the entire crop of '65 models, and the most beautiful car to appear in this country since before World War II. ...When the pictures of the '65 Corvair arrived in our offices, the man who opened the envelope actually let out a great shout of delight and amazement on first seeing the car, and in thirty seconds the whole staff was charging around, each wanting to be the first to show somebody else, each wanting the vicarious kick of hearing that characteristic war-whoop from the first-time viewer. […] Our ardor had cooled a little by the time we got to drive the cars—then we went nuts all over again. The new rear suspension, the new softer spring rates in front, the bigger brakes, the addition of some more power, all these factors had us driving around like idiots—zooming around the handling loop dragging with each other, standing on the brakes—until we had to reluctantly turn the car over to some other impatient journalist. […] The '65 Corvair is an outstanding car. It doesn't go fast enough, but we love it.

The standard 95 hp (71 kW; 96 PS) and optional 110 hp (82 kW; 112 PS) engines were carried forward from 1964. The previous 150 hp (112 kW; 152 PS) Spyder engine was replaced by the normally aspirated 140 hp (104 kW; 142 PS) for the new Corsa. The engine was unusual in offering four single-throat carburetors, to which were added larger valves and a dual exhaust system. A 180 hp (134 kW; 182 PS) turbocharged engine was optional on the Corsa, which offered either standard three-speed or optional (US$92) four-speed manual transmissions. The 140 hp (104 kW; 142 PS) engine was optional on 500 and Monza models with manual or Powerglide transmissions. All engines got some of the heavy-duty internal parts from the Turbocharged engine for better durability.

New refinements appeared on the 1965 redesign. The Corsa came standard with an instrument panel featuring a 140 mph (230 km/h) speedometer with resettable trip odometer, a 6,000 rpm tachometer, cylinder head temperature gauge, analog clock with a sweeping second hand, a manifold vacuum/pressure gauge, and fuel gauge. All Second Generation Corvairs offered a much better heater system, larger brakes borrowed from the Chevelle, a stronger differential ring gear, an alternator (replacing the generator), and significant chassis refinements were made; a new fully articulated rear suspension virtually eliminated the danger of the previous generation's swing axles and was based on the contemporary Corvette Sting Ray (Corvair used coil springs while the Sting Ray uses a transverse leaf). Additionally, an AM/FM stereo radio, in-dash All Weather Air Conditioning, telescopically adjustable steering column, and a Special Purpose Chassis Equipment ("Z17") handling package, consisting of a special performance suspension and quick ratio steering box, were new options for 1965. The Monza and Corvair 500 Sport Sedans were the only compact cars ever available in the U.S. as pillarless four-door hardtops.

The station wagon, panel van, and pickup body styles had all been dropped and 1965 was the last year for the Greenbrier window van, which was retained mainly for fleet orders, with 1,528 being built. In all, 235,528 Corvairs were built in 1965, an increase of 30,000 units over 1964. Chevrolet replaced the Corvair-based vans with the Chevrolet Sportvan/GMC Handi-Van, which used a traditional front-engine/rear-drive axle borrowed from the Chevy II.

==== 1966 ====
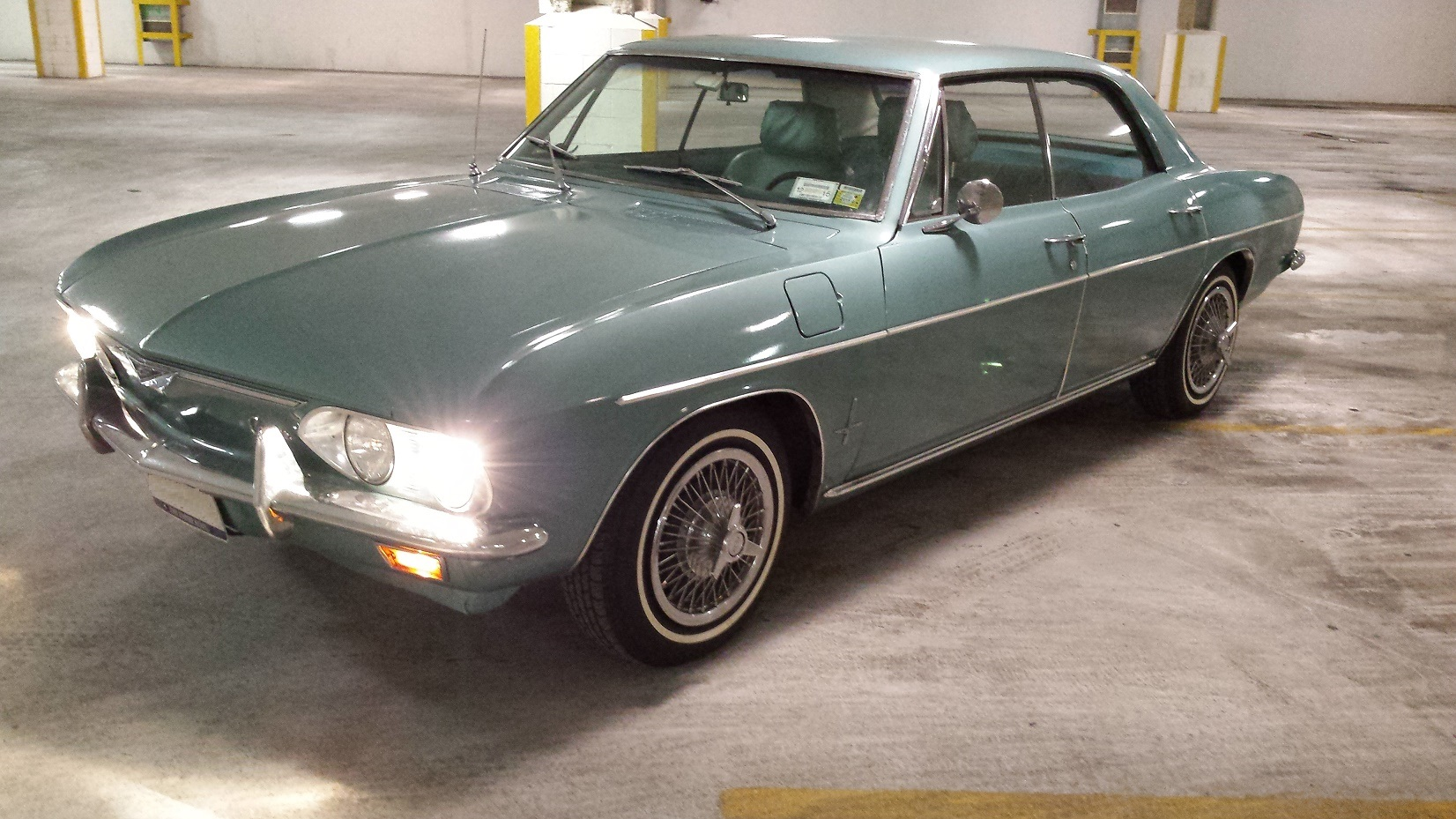
1966 Chevrolet Corvair Monza Sport Sedan

The 1966 lineup remained essentially unchanged from 1965. One change of note was a new four-speed synchromesh transmission using the standard Saginaw gear set with 3.11:1 first gear ratio used by other GM 6-cylinder vehicles. The steering column was changed to a two-piece design with a universal joint, lessening the danger of intrusion during a front-end collision (actually a mid-1965 running change). A plastic air dam was installed below the front valence panel to conceal the front suspension and underbody, and lessen crosswind sensitivity. In front, The "lock door" emblem (covering the lockset for the trunk lock) was changed from red to blue and featured a shorter bar. At the rear, new larger taillight lenses were used featuring a thin chrome ring around the center of the light. Air conditioned cars received a new condenser that was mounted in front of the engine, eliminating the previous unit mounted atop the engine, requiring its removal for most engine service. The Corvair script nameplate was moved from atop the trunk lid to a position next to the driver's side headlight bezel. Sales began a decline as a result of Ralph Nader's book highlighting the Corvair's deficiencies – and the new Mustang offering V8s up to 271 hp (202 kW; 275 PS) compared to the Corvair's 180 hp (134 kW; 182 PS) top powertrain. Rumors of the upcoming "Panther" – the code name for the forthcoming Camaro, slated as a direct competitor for the Mustang – further undercut sales. A decision was made to discontinue further development of the Corvair. Production for the model year was down to 103,743.

==== 1967 ====
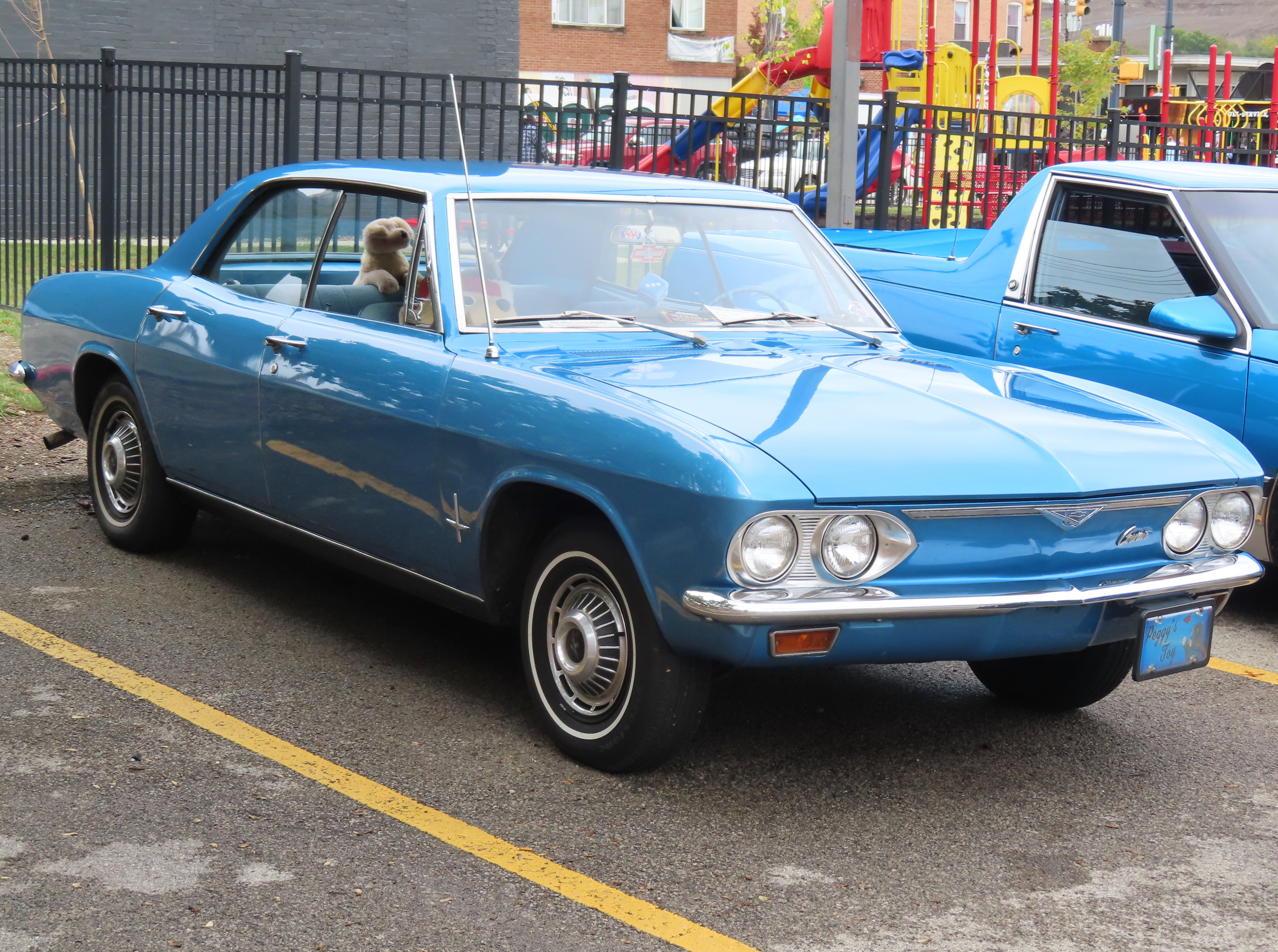
1967 Chevrolet Corvair Monza Sport Sedan

In 1967, the Corvair line was trimmed to the 500 and Monza Hardtop Coupes and Hardtop Sedans, and the Monza Convertible. This model year was the first with a collapsible steering column. A dual circuit master cylinder with warning light, nylon reinforced brake hoses, stronger steel (instead of aluminum) door hinges, "mushroomed" instrument panel knobs, and a vinyl-edged day/night mirror were all made standard equipment. Bucket seats in Monza models were now of the same "Astro" style as those on the new-for-1967 Camaro, featuring a new-thin-shell design. Chevrolet introduced a 50,000 mi (80,000 km) engine warranty on all Chevrolet models including the Corvair. Chevrolet was still actively marketing the Corvair in 1967, including color print ads and an "I Love My Corvair" bumper sticker campaign by dealers, but production and sales continued to fall off drastically. Only 27,253 copies were built. The chrome rings around the center of the taillights were made thicker.

==== 1968 ====
The four-door hardtop was discontinued for the 1968 model year leaving three models – the 500 and Monza two-door hardtops and the Monza convertible. Air conditioning was dropped as an option due to concerns about thermal loading from the now-standard Air Injection Reactor ("smog pump"). The GM multiplex stereo system was also discontinued when new units changed wiring adapters; the Corvair's 9-pin connector would no longer fit the new units. Additional safety features, including side marker lights and shoulder belts for closed models, were fitted per federal government requirements. The steering wheel for 500s was the same as the base Nova's, while Monzas included the same wheel as the Camaro. An Impala-style "Deluxe" steering wheel was optional. Chevrolet stopped advertising the Corvair, and sales fell to 15,400.

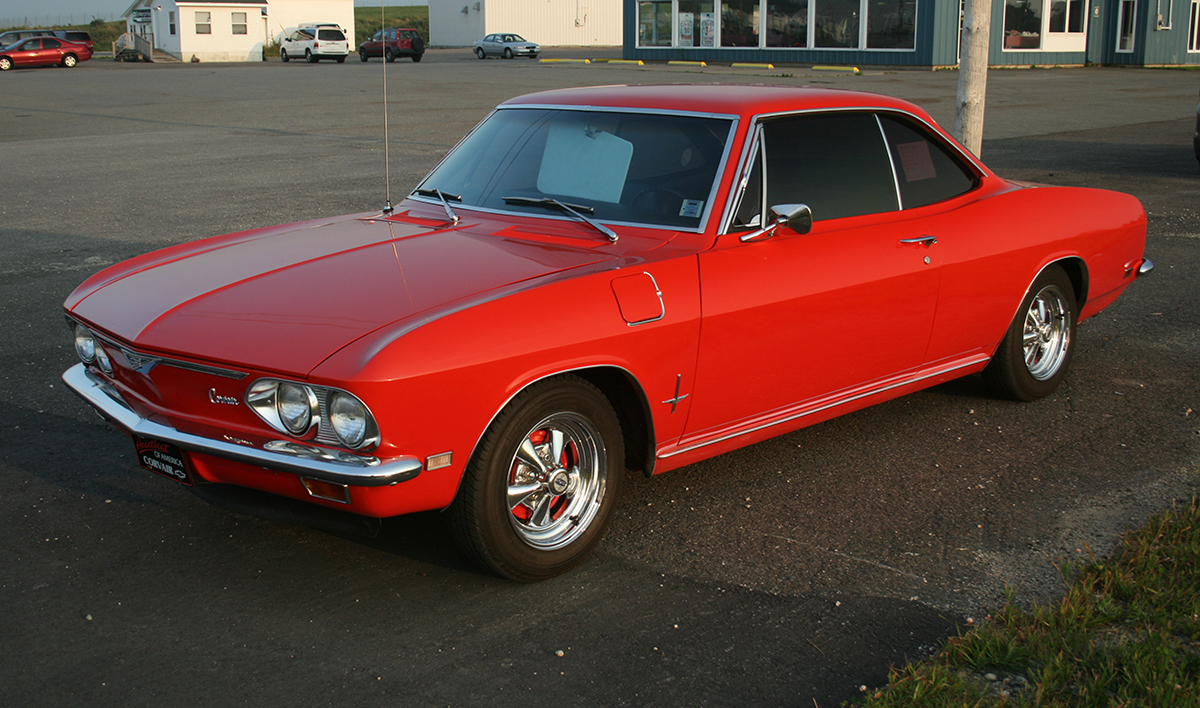
1968 Chevrolet Corvair Monza Front

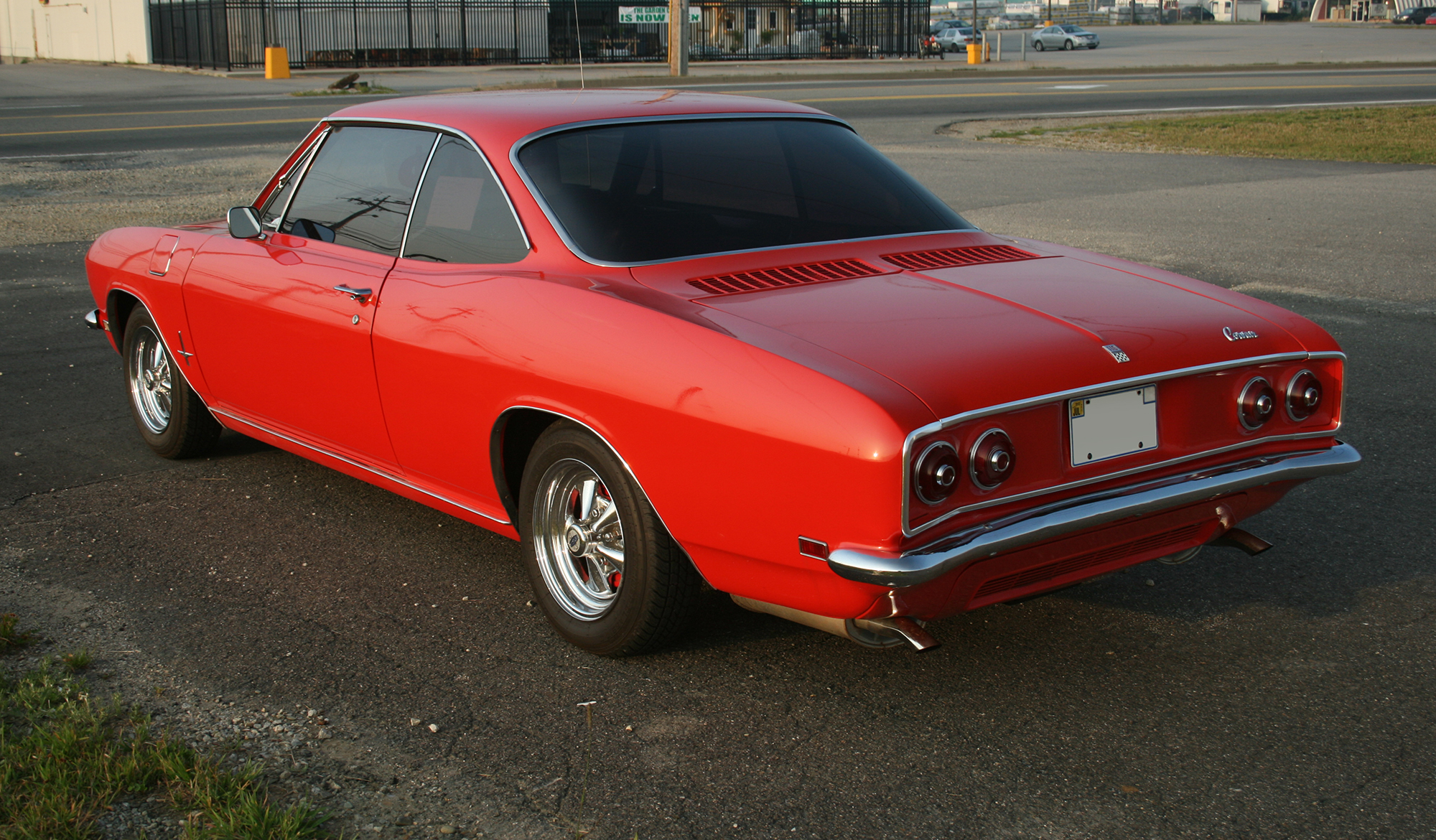
1968 Chevrolet Corvair Monza Rear

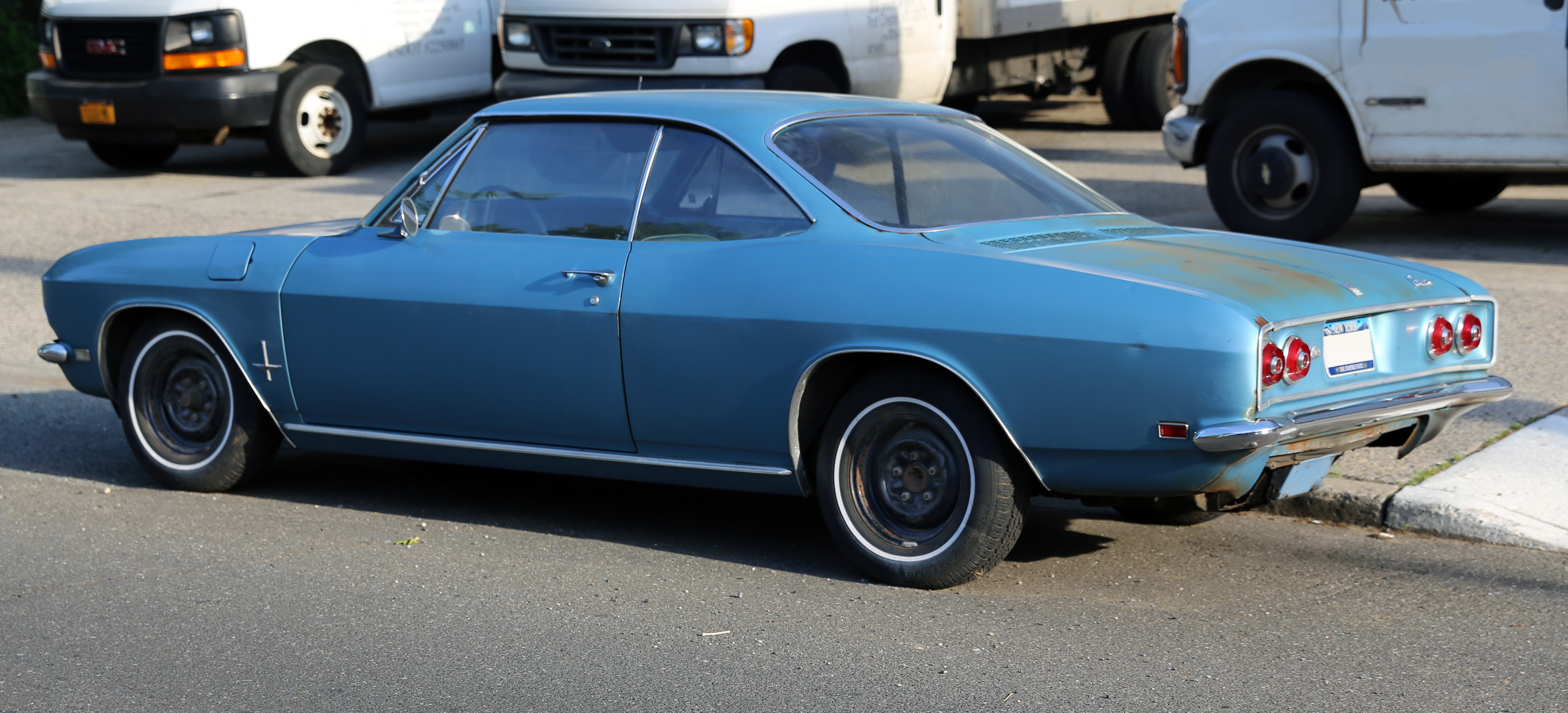
1968 Corvair Monza coupe with 110-hp engine. The clear front side marker light was only for 1968.

==== 1969 ====
The 1969 model year Corvairs were introduced on September 26, 1968. Essentially a carryover line with the three models. Changes included new colors for the exterior and interior, front seat head restraints, and more comfortable vinyl upholstered bucket seats for the Monza models. The Corvair was the only GM car in 1969 that did not include a new "skid" windshield header.

The Willow Run plant where the Corvair was initially produced, also assembled the 1969 Nova models. Demand for the conventional, compact Nova was high that it was decided in November 1968 to move Corvair assembly from the main production line to a special off-line area dubbed the "Corvair Room". This alleviated the problem of having a completely different car mixed in with the Nova models. Corvair bodies arrived from Fisher Body and awaited final assembly in the off-line area where they were essentially hand-built by a dedicated team. A total of 6,000 Corvairs were built through May 14, 1969, of which 521 were convertibles.

=== End of production ===
While the 1965 Corvair was received as a well-engineered high-performance driver's car, that accomplishment was overshadowed by the phenomenal market success of the Ford Mustang. GM saw the advantages to the route adopted by Ford with the Mustang, a four-seat semi-coupe body on a standard compact (Falcon) chassis with a small-block V8 motor and four-on-the-floor offered as power options. The Corvair was not cheap to produce; developing and marketing a Mustang-style model based on the Nova platform had cost advantages. Unlike the Corvair, a derivative model could evolve within GM's standard lines of manufacturing technology. The 1965 publication of Unsafe at Any Speed sullied the reputation of the Corvair, although the issues had nothing to do with the existing model. Under competition from the Mustang and the publicity hit from Unsafe, Corvair sales plummeted over half in 1966. GM saw the advantages of developing the Camaro, instead of the Corvair.

Chevrolet had planned on ending Corvair production after the 1966 model year. Development and engineering changes were halted in 1966 on the year-old, redesigned second-generation cars with mainly federally mandated emissions and safety changes made thereafter. An increasing lack of interest from the company, especially from Chevrolet's general manager John DeLorean, and a complete absence of Corvair advertising after 1967 reflected the company's priorities, including promotion of three redesigned models for 1968 – the Corvette, Chevelle, and Chevy II Nova. The Corvair was referred to as "the phantom" by Car Life magazine in their 1968 Monza road test, and by 1969 Chevrolet's Corvair four-page brochure was "by request only". During its final year of production, 6,000 cars were produced.

Chevrolet had proposed a third generation (1970 onward) Corvair, essentially a re-skin of the 1965–1969 model resembling the 1973 GM A Body intermediates, particularly the 1973 Pontiac Grand Am, retaining Corvair proportions. Having passed the point of full-scale clay models, Chevrolet halted development in early 1968. Unlike the Turbo Hydramatic 400, the Turbo Hydramatic 350 transmission, introduced in the 1968 Camaro and later adopted by most Chevrolet models had been configured for use in the third generation Corvair.

=== Production notes ===
Year	Production	Base price	Notes
1960	253,268	US$1,984–2,238	500 and 700 four-door sedans were the only models available at introduction; 500 and 700 club coupes become available January 1960, Monza club coupe introduced spring 1960 with 95 hp (71 kW) "Super Turbo Air" high-performance engine option, and four-speed transmission, gas heater optional, spare tire mounted in luggage compartment, and central automatic choke. Sales were impeded by the U.S. Steel strike shortly after its introduction, causing a shortage of new 1960 models. Monza is the first Chevrolet model with 'narrow' 1 in (25 mm) stripe whitewall tires.
1961	337,371	US$1,920–2,331	Lakewood station wagon, Greenbrier, Corvan, and Loadside and Rampside pickups added; 145 in^{3} engine and optional three-speed manual; spare tire now rear-mounted on models not equipped with mid-1961 all-weather air conditioning option. Manual choke. The first full year of Monza production demonstrated its sales success, forcing Ford to develop the Falcon Sprint and, eventually, Mustang, to exploit the small sporty car market uncovered by the Monza.
1962	336,005	US$1,992–2,846	Monza Convertible and turbocharged Monza Spyder added mid-1962, heavy-duty suspension optional with front anti-roll bar, rear axle limit straps, positraction differential, new Monza full wheel covers, Kelsey Hayes knock-off wire wheels added to options, Monza wagon becomes available, 500 wagon dropped – wagons lose "Lakewood" designation. Station wagons were discontinued in mid-1962 to provide capacity for other Corvair and Chevy II models.
1963	288,419	US$1,982–2,798	Self-adjusting brakes and small engine improvements (belt guides, improved oil cooler), new Monza rocker moldings, Loadside pickup discontinued.
1964	215,300	US$2,000–2,811	Larger, 164 CID, engine, improved rear suspension with added transverse leaf springs and revised coil springs, front stabilizer bar added as standard, finned rear brake drums, new optional full wheel covers standard for Monza with specific centers, new Monza chrome rocker and wheel-opening moldings, last year for Rampside pickup.
1965	247,092	US$2,066–2,665	Major redesign of the Corvair—all-new Fisher Z body, hardtop styling for all models, 700 series discontinued, Corsa series replaces Monza Spyder series; Greenbrier discontinued mid-year after 1,528 built; revised front and redesigned fully independent rear suspension, improved heater and air conditioning systems, numerous small engine and chassis refinements. Mid-year introduction of Z17 "steering and suspension" option includes special springs with rates increased approximately 25%, special shock absorbers, a 16:1 steering box, and special steering arms. New options include 140 hp (100 kW) engine, telescopic steering column, AM/FM, FM stereo, heavy-duty oil bath air cleaner precleaner system with engine shrouding for dust control. The front Chevy emblem is painted red.
1966	109,880	US$2,083–2,682	Improved three- and four-speed synchromesh manual transmissions; last year of Corsa model, last year of Canadian production at Oshawa. Late 1965 modification to steering shaft adds a U-joint and floor reinforcement to reduce risks of column intrusion in collisions. Tire size upgraded to 7.00–13 from 6.50 to 13, with narrower .625 in (15.9 mm) whitewall. New "spoke"-style wheel covers for all models with specific model centers. The Front Chevy emblem was painted blue (remaining this color until the end of production). New optional equipment includes headrests, shoulder harnesses, four-speaker Delco FM stereo multiplex, power rear antenna, and mag-style (N96) wheel covers. A new, smaller condenser was mounted behind the engine for air-conditioned cars. Four lap belts (two front, two rear), padded instrument panel, larger taillight lenses, and day-night rearview mirror, became standard on all models. Backup lights, windshield washers, and padded sun visors were now standard. Monzas and Corsas feature a black crinkle finish on instrument panels. New rear deck emblem designs for 110 hp and 140 hp cars.
1967	27,253	US$2,128–2,540	Last year for the four-door hardtop sedan, energy-absorbing steering column, dual circuit brake system, stronger door hinges introduced. New safety three-spoke steering wheel standard. Four-way hazard flashers, lane-change turn signal control, additional padding on the instrument panel cover, and safety control knobs were introduced. 110 hp (82 kW) engine is only optional engine at introduction; eventually 140 hp (100 kW) becomes available as central office production order in limited production as COPO 9551 "B". New "safety" Powerglide shift knob, and shoulder belt mount points were added. New style standard hub caps for 500. Chrome ring inside the taillight lenses was widened. New options included speed warning, a Delco stereo tape system. New thin-shell "Astro-bucket" front seats with new vinyl pattern standard on Monzas.
1968	15,399	US$2,243–2,626	Air injection reactor standard in all markets, 140 hp (100 kW) engine reintroduced as a regular production option, optional all-weather air conditioning discontinued, multiplex stereo option discontinued; fuel vapor return line and ignition key warning buzzer new standard features. Front shoulder harnesses become standard after 1 January 1968, rear shoulder harnesses are optional on all models. Side marker lights (clear in front with amber bulbs, red in rear) were added to fenders on all models. New padding around the central section of the dash; thicker padding on top of the dash, steering wheel spokes on Monzas now brushed aluminum (instead of chrome).
1969	6,000	US$2,528–2,641	Last year – production through May 1969; 521 Monza convertibles of 6,000 Corvairs produced; minor changes; improved clutch cable design on manual transmission cars, wider bucket seats with new head restraints, wider interior mirror, refined front brake hose design, Front side markers now feature amber lenses and clear bulbs (opposite from 1968). 140 hp (100 kW) engine, F41 special purpose suspension, N44 quick ratio steering box positraction and telescopic steering column remain available. Interior window handles featured clear-colored knobs. Deluxe steering wheel option discontinued. New style ignition, door, and trunk keys introduced. The last few months of production cars were hand-built in a special off-line area of the Willow Run plant.
Total	1,835,170		

==== Production plants ====
All locations are cars only, except as noted:

- Willow Run Assembly, Ypsilanti, MI 1960–69
- Leeds Assembly Plant, Kansas City, MO 1960–61
- Oakland Assembly, Oakland, CA 1960–63
- Van Nuys Assembly Van Nuys, CA 1963, 1965 & 1966
- St. Louis Truck Assembly, St. Louis, MO 1961–65 (FCs)
- Flint Truck Assembly, Flint, MI 1961–64 (FCs)
- Oshawa Car Assembly, Oshawa, Ontario 1960–66
- Mexico City 1961–63 (CKD)
- Caracas, Venezuela 1960–62 (CKD)
- Bienne, Switzerland 1960–67 (CKD)
- Antwerp, Belgium 1960–67 (CKD)
- Copenhagen, Denmark 1960–61
- Port Elizabeth, South Africa 1960–62 (All 1960 CKD models)

Willow Run, Kansas City, Oakland, and Van Nuys were all Chevrolet assembly plants with adjacent Fisher Body plants.

St. Louis and Flint were Chevrolet truck plants, although Chevy had full-size car plants in both cities and in St. Louis the plants were adjacent.

Oshawa was operated solely by GM of Canada Ltd.

The CKD plants were operated by GM Overseas Operations (GMOO).

==== Model designations ====
===== Standard wheelbase =====
500 – base model Corvair with lowest trim level. Always came with rubber mats, bench seats, and very little trim.

700 – next trim level up from the 500 model. These models also came with rubber mats and bench seats, but had more extensive exterior trim and additional features as standard. (this model was discontinued after 1964).

Lakewood – Corvair station wagon (1961–62) available as a 500 or 700. The Monza wagon was available in 1962 and is not really a Lakewood. All window glass was specific to this model due to its taller roofline.

Monza (900) – the top of the trim line for 1960–1963 only. In 1964, it was below the Monza Spyder, which was now its own model. For the 1965–66 model year, the Monza ranked below the Corsa in trim level. After the Corsa model was dropped, the Monza was once again at the top of the Corvair line for 1967 through 1969. Monzas usually came with bucket seats (although special bench seats were available in some years). Monzas had carpeting and special trim packages.

Spyder – the Monza Spyder was an option package during the 1962 and 1963 model years, and for 1964 became a full-fledged model. It was equipped with a 150 hp (112 kW; 152 PS) turbocharged engine, "full instrumentation", special emblems, and all the "Monza" trim items.

Corsa – top of the line sport model for 1965–66. It was the only model available with the optional 180 hp (134 kW; 182 PS) turbocharged flat-six. The base engine was the new four-carburetor 140 hp (104 kW; 142 PS) "big valve" engine. Corsas had "full instrumentation", special emblems, and trim with a special "argent" silver painted rear cove area and pinstriping on the 1965 models. The optional 180 hp engine delivered an increase in power over the 1964 150 hp engine of the same displacement by slightly enlarging the carburetor, and increasing the size of the internal impeller and turbine blades.

===== 95 inch wheelbase =====
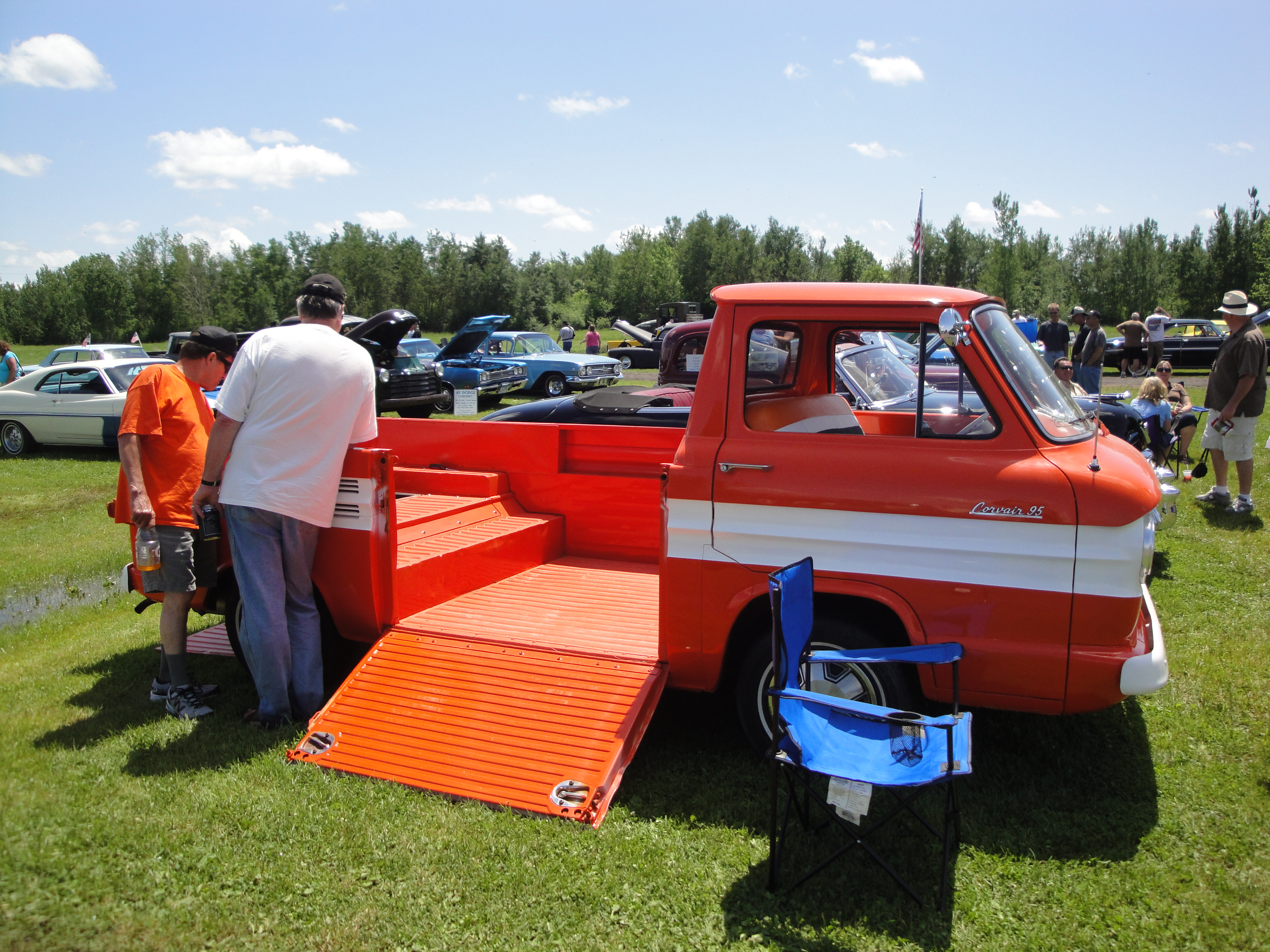
1962 Chevrolet Corvair Rampside

Corvan – Corvair panel van that was available 1961–1964

Rampside – Corvair pickup with a ramp on one side that was available 1961–1964

Greenbrier – a windowed van that was available 1961–1965

Loadside – Corvair pickup without the ramp which was available 1961 and 1962

Deluxe – option package of upgraded interior and trim available on some of the "van" models

F.C. (forward control) – a Chevy term that applied to all Corvair 95 van models indicating that the driver and controls were forward of the front wheels

== Handling issues ==
1960–63 swing axle suspension

Swing axle suspension characteristics: camber change on bumps, jacking on rebound

The first-generation Corvair featured a rear engine + swing axle design similar to that of the Renault Dauphine and Volkswagen Beetle – a design which eliminates universal joints at the wheels and keeps the rear wheels perpendicular to the half-shafts, rather than the road surface. The design can allow rear tires to undergo large camber angle changes during fast cornering due to side g-forces causing "rebound" camber and decreasing the tread contact with the road surface, leading to a loss of rear wheel grip and oversteer – a dynamically unstable condition where a driver can lose control and spin. The problem is most severe in combinations having the engine and swing axle at the same end of the car: in most cases this is at the rear, and the Corvair is no exception. The rebound camber is worse because of the greater inertial mass over the rear wheels with this combination; the higher center of gravity during rebound causes additional problems. A station wagon body also exacerbates the tendency because it increases the weight at the rear (and raises the center of gravity). Oversteer is exacerbated by deceleration during cornering due to increased side g-force and lightened load on rear tires (lift-off oversteer). Understeer is common in front-engine cars due to more weight, and inertia, on the front tires. Both conditions are dangerous when a car is driven at its cornering limits. Design options to ameliorate swing axle handling:

- Anti-roll bar: As a production option, engineers had advocated but management rejected the inclusion of a front anti-roll bar on the original 1960 Corvair, which would have ameliorated the car's handling – shifting weight transfer to the front outboard tire, considerably reducing rear slip angles – thereby avoiding potential oversteer.
- Tire pressure differential: As with the Renault Dauphine and pre-1968 Volkswagen Beetle, Corvair engineers relied on a cost-free tire pressure differential to eliminate oversteer characteristics – low front and high rear tire pressure –a strategy which induced understeer (increasing front slip angles faster than the rear). Nonetheless, the strategy offered a significant disadvantage: owners and mechanics could inadvertently but easily re-introduce oversteer characteristics by over-inflating the front tires (i.e., to typical pressures for other cars with other, more prevalent suspension systems). The recommended low front tire pressure also compromised the tire load capacity.

Sports Car Graphic published a thorough 1960 technical evaluation by noted race car driver, racing mechanic and technical editor, Jerry Titus, just after the Corvair's debut, noting that the "otherwise admirable compact could be treacherous in a corner." Analyzing what Titus described as the Corvair's " rather weird way in which the car wagged its tail," he ranked possible solutions: use of high-strength high-adhesion tires (e.g., Michelin X), decambering the rear suspension design or complete redesign of the suspension.

While the Corvair sedan offered competent handling, "the average buyer more accustomed to front-engined cars, did not take [into] account the car's different handling characteristics." Chevrolet made a succession of improvements to the first-generation Corvair suspension. For the 1962 model year, a front anti-roll bar became available as an option. For the 1964 model year, the front anti-roll bar became standard equipment and the rear suspension was modified to include a camber compensating, transverse-mounted leaf spring extending between the rear wheels to limit rear wheel camber change, and carrying much of the rear weight combined with softer coil springs. Also in 1962, two Corvairs were tested around Riverside for 24 hours: one managed to survive the test, despite crossing the finish line with no fuel, at an average speed of 64.54 mph (103.87 km/h), and burned a quart of oil, while the other one crashed around the esses.

For the 1965 model year, GM redesigned the Corvair rear suspension completely, with a fully independent rear suspension closely resembling that of the contemporary Corvette. The redesigned suspension reduced the rear roll center to half its previous height, using fully articulated half-axles that offered constant camber on the rear tires in all driving situations. This eliminated the handling problems of the first-generation models.

=== Legal fallout ===
Consumer protection activist Ralph Nader addressed the handling issues of the first-generation (1960–1963) Corvair in his 1965 book, Unsafe at Any Speed. GM had over 100 lawsuits pending in connection with crashes involving the Corvair, which subsequently became the initial material for Nader's investigations. The book highlighted crashes related to the Corvair's suspension and identified the Chevrolet suspension engineer who had fought management's decision to omit – for cost reasons – the front anti-roll bar installed on later models. Nader said during subsequent Congressional hearings, the Corvair is "the leading candidate for the un-safest-car title". Subsequently, Corvair sales fell from 220,000 in 1965 to 109,880 in 1966. By 1968, production fell to 14,800. Public response to the book played a role in the National Traffic and Motor Vehicle Safety Act in 1966.

A 1972 safety commission report conducted by Texas A&M University concluded that the 1960–1963 Corvair possessed no greater potential for loss of control than its contemporary competitors in extreme situations. The U.S. Department of Transportation (DOT) issued a press release in 1972 describing the findings of NHTSA testing from the previous year. NHTSA had conducted a series of comparative tests in 1971 studying the handling of the 1963 Corvair and four contemporary cars – a Ford Falcon, Plymouth Valiant, Volkswagen Beetle, and Renault Dauphine – along with a second-generation Corvair (with its completely redesigned, independent rear suspension). The 143-page report reviewed NHTSA's extreme-condition handling tests, national crash-involvement data for the cars in the test as well as General Motors' internal documentation regarding the Corvair's handling. NHTSA went on to contract an independent advisory panel of engineers to review the tests. This review panel concluded that "the 1960–63 Corvair compares favorably with contemporary vehicles used in the tests [...] the handling and stability performance of the 1960–63 Corvair does not result in an abnormal potential for loss of control or rollover, and it is at least as good as the performance of some contemporary vehicles both foreign and domestic." Former GM executive and automotive engineer John DeLorean asserted in his book On a Clear Day You Can See General Motors that Nader's criticisms were valid.

Journalist David E. Davis, in a 2009 article in Automobile Magazine, noted that despite Nader's claim that swing-axle rear suspension was dangerous, Porsche, Mercedes-Benz, Tatra, and Volkswagen all used similar swing-axle concepts during that era. (The handling of other rear-engine swing-axle cars, particularly the Volkswagen Type I and II, has been criticized as well.) Some contend that Nader's lack of an automotive engineering degree or a driver's license at the time he wrote Unsafe at Any Speed disqualifies him as a critic of automotive safety. In response to Nader's book, Mechanix Illustrated reviewer Tom McCahill tried to get a 1963 Corvair to flip, at one point sliding sideways into a street curb, but could not turn over the vehicle.

=== Vindication ===
The Corvair's reputation and legacy, as well as those of General Motors, were tarnished by accusations about its handling ability; the car was scrutinized in Ralph Nader's 1965 book Unsafe at Any Speed. Ralph Nader's accusations were proven false by the 1972 National Highway Traffic Safety Administration safety commission report. Support for the tests, conducted at College Station, Texas, was provided by the Texas Transportation Institute (TTl) Texas A&M University Research Foundation. The investigation concluded:

The 1960–1963 Corvair understeers in the same manner as conventional passenger cars up to about 0.4 g lateral acceleration, makes a transition from understeer, through neutral steer, to oversteer in a range from about 0.4 g to 0.5 g lateral acceleration. This transition does not result in the abnormal potential for loss of control. The limited accident data available indicates that the rollover rate of the 1960–1963 Corvair is comparable to other light domestic cars. The 1960–1963 Corvair compared favorably with the other contemporary vehicles used in the NHTSA Input Response Tests. The handling and stability performance of the 1960–1963 Corvair does not result in an abnormal potential for loss of control or rollover and it is at least as good as the performance of some contemporary vehicles both foreign and domestic.

== Legacy ==
=== Design influence ===
The first-generation Corvair (1960–1964) has been credited with influencing car design worldwide. Styled in GM's advanced styling studio in 1957, under the leadership of then director Ned Nickels, the compact design was made using cues from earlier Oldsmobile and Chevrolet models. The most notable design feature, its high, wrap-around beltline, was "borrowed" by other carmakers not long after the Corvair's release. These cars included the BMW 1602/2002, NSU Prinz, Hillman Imp, Fiat 1300/1500, Volkswagen Type 34 Karmann Ghia and the Mazda 800.

The Corvair's combination of power and light weight introduced European manufacturers to an American market niche for small popular-priced sedans with more power and driveability than the contemporary European economy sedans and a more versatile and practical design than European sports cars. That overall concept was exemplified by Volkswagen's Type 34 Karmann Ghia and Type 3 "notchback" in 1961 and BMW's "New Class" sedans in 1962. BMW developed the concept further by mass-marketing higher performance high-quality sedans, setting the trend of the "sport sedan" category that would soon include offerings from a variety of European, and eventually Japanese, manufacturers.

== Concept cars ==
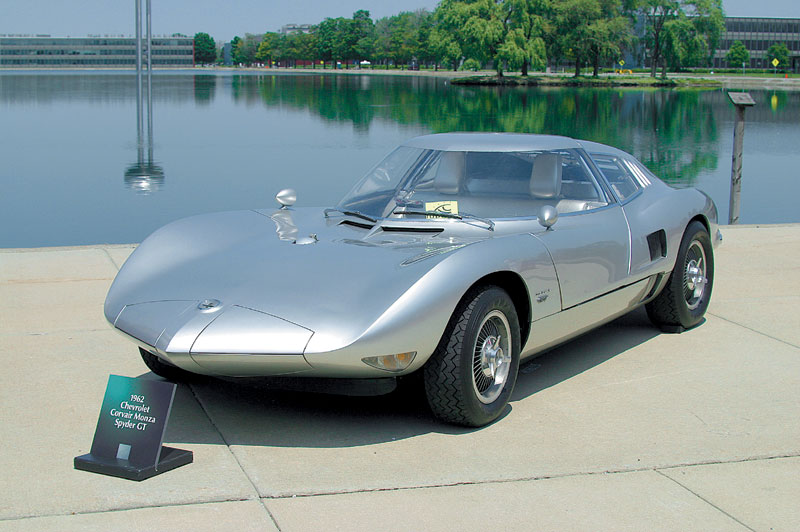
Chevrolet Corvair Monza GT concept

The Corvair spawned a number of innovative concept vehicles including the Corvair SS, Monza GT, Monza SS, and Astro I. In Europe, Italian coachbuilder Bertone designed a very advanced one-off prototype for the 1963 Geneva Motor Show; the "Chevrolet Testudo". This was among the first designs of Giorgetto Giugiaro, the chief designer at Bertone at the time. The Testudo later suffered a collision with another Bertone concept car, the Alfa Romeo Canguro, while on track at the Monza circuit. There was also a Pininfarina built concept called the "Corvair Speciale", and two other Pininfarina concepts known as "Coupe I" and "Coupe II".

The Chevrolet Corvair Monza GT coupe toured together with the Monza SS (Spyder) in early 1963, making a public appearance at the New York International Auto Show. Although both cars were based on the Corvair drivetrain, each represented a futuristic development of the Corvair design. In the SS convertible, the engine (with a four-carburetor setup) was left in its stock location behind the transaxle, allowing for a shorter (88 in (2,200 mm)) wheelbase. The Monza GT is housed at the GM's Heritage Center in Detroit.

A 1966 concept vehicle, the Electrovair II was a 1966 Monza 4-door hardtop modified with a 532 volt, 115 hp (86 kW) electric motor replacing the gasoline engine – following a 1964 version known as Electrovair I. With the 1966 model, silver-zinc batteries were used and placed in the trunk and engine compartment, and the body was slightly modified to accept the conversion. The car was handicapped by the high cost of the batteries ($160,000), a limited driving range (40–80 mi (64–129 km)), and short battery life.

== Racing and modified Corvairs ==
=== Yenko Stinger ===
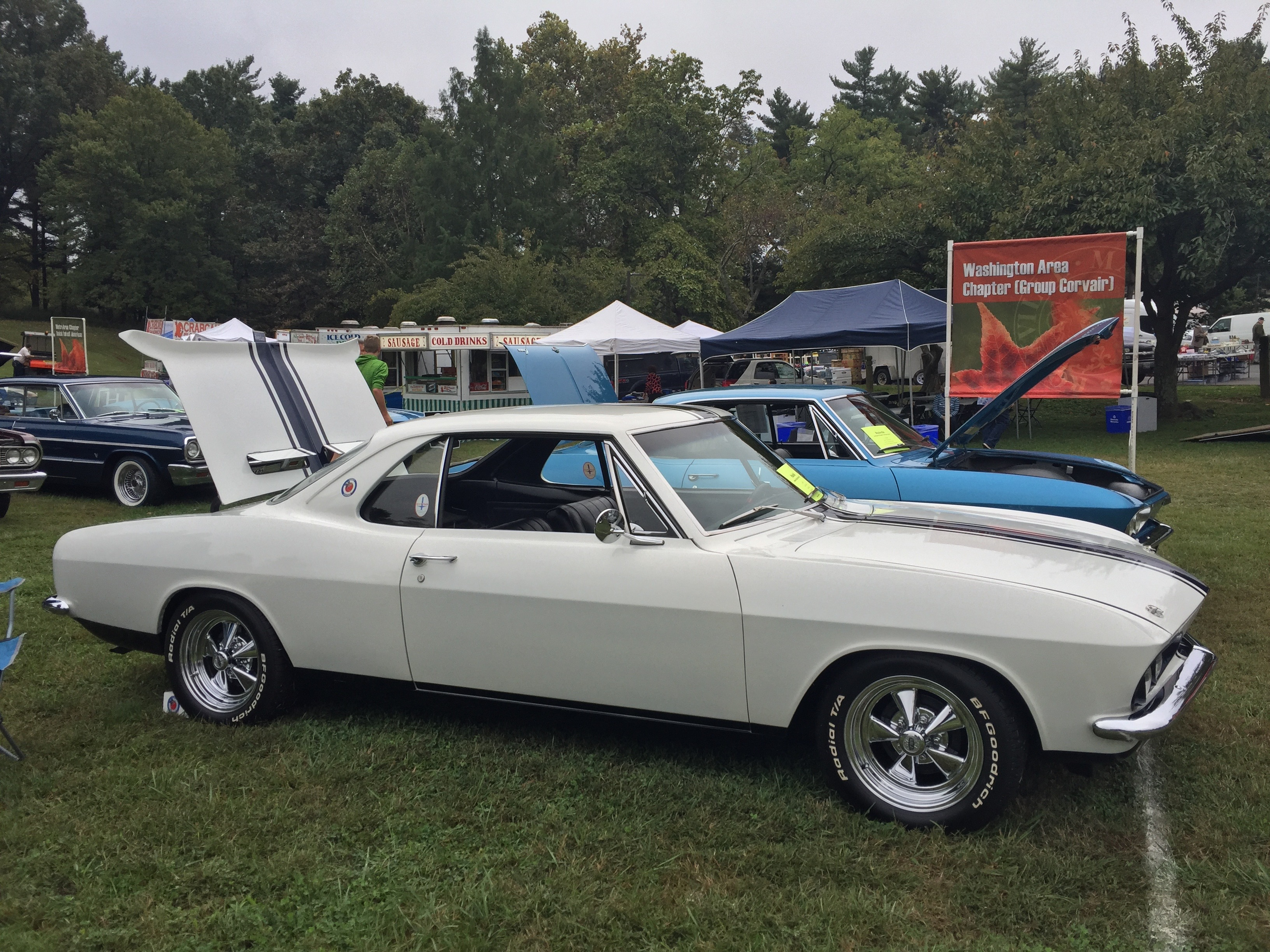
1966 Yenko Stinger Stage II

Don Yenko, who had been racing Corvettes, could not compete successfully against the Carroll Shelby Mustangs after they arrived on the scene. Yenko decided to race modified Corvairs, beginning with the 1966 model. As the stock Corvair did not fit into any of the SCCA categories, Yenko modified four-carburetor Corsas into "sports cars" by removing the back seat and introducing various performance improvements. As the SCCA required 100 cars to be manufactured to homologate the model for production racing, Yenko completed 100 Stingers in one month in 1965. Although all were white, as the SCCA required for American cars at the time, [the normal competition trim for U.S.-built cars was white with 2 blue stripes] there was a great deal of variety between individual cars; some had exterior modifications including fiberglass engine covers with spoilers, some did not; some received engine upgrades developing 160, 190, 220, or 240 hp (119, 142, 164, or 179 kW). All were equipped by the Chevrolet factory with heavy-duty suspension, four-speed transmission, quicker steering ratio, "positraction" limited-slip differentials (50 with 3.89 gears, and 50 with 3.55 after Chevrolet discontinued the 3.89) and dual brake master cylinders (the first application of this by Chevrolet, to become standard equipment the next year). Because most of the engine cooling in air-cooled engines is done by circulating oil, an oil cooler was necessary for competition use, this was mounted externally on the rear body section above the left wheel.

The Stingers competed in Class D production dominated by the Triumph TR4. In its first race in January 1966, the Stinger finished in second by only one second. By the end of the 1966 season, Jerry Thompson had won the Central Division Championship and placed fifth in the 1966 Nationals, Dick Thompson, a successful Corvette race driver, had won the Northeast Division Championship, and Jim Spencer had won the Central Division Championship, with Dino Milani taking second place. The next year, Chevrolet dropped the Corsa line. The Monza line was initially not available with the 4-carburetor engine. These were eventually offered as a special performance option, along with the 3.89 differential. The Monza instrumentation did not have a tachometer or head temperature gauges, which had to be separately installed. The SCCA, on the other hand, had relaxed its ruling regarding color, and the cars were available in red or blue. It is believed that only fourteen 1967 Stingers were built. Dana Chevrolet distributed Stingers on the U.S. West coast and ordered an additional three similar cars to be built to Stinger specifications, but with the AIR injection system to meet California emissions laws, with Yenko's permission. A total of 185 Stingers are believed to have been built, the last being YS-9700 built for Goodyear Tire and Rubber Company as a tire test vehicle in 1969–1970.

=== Fitch Sprint ===
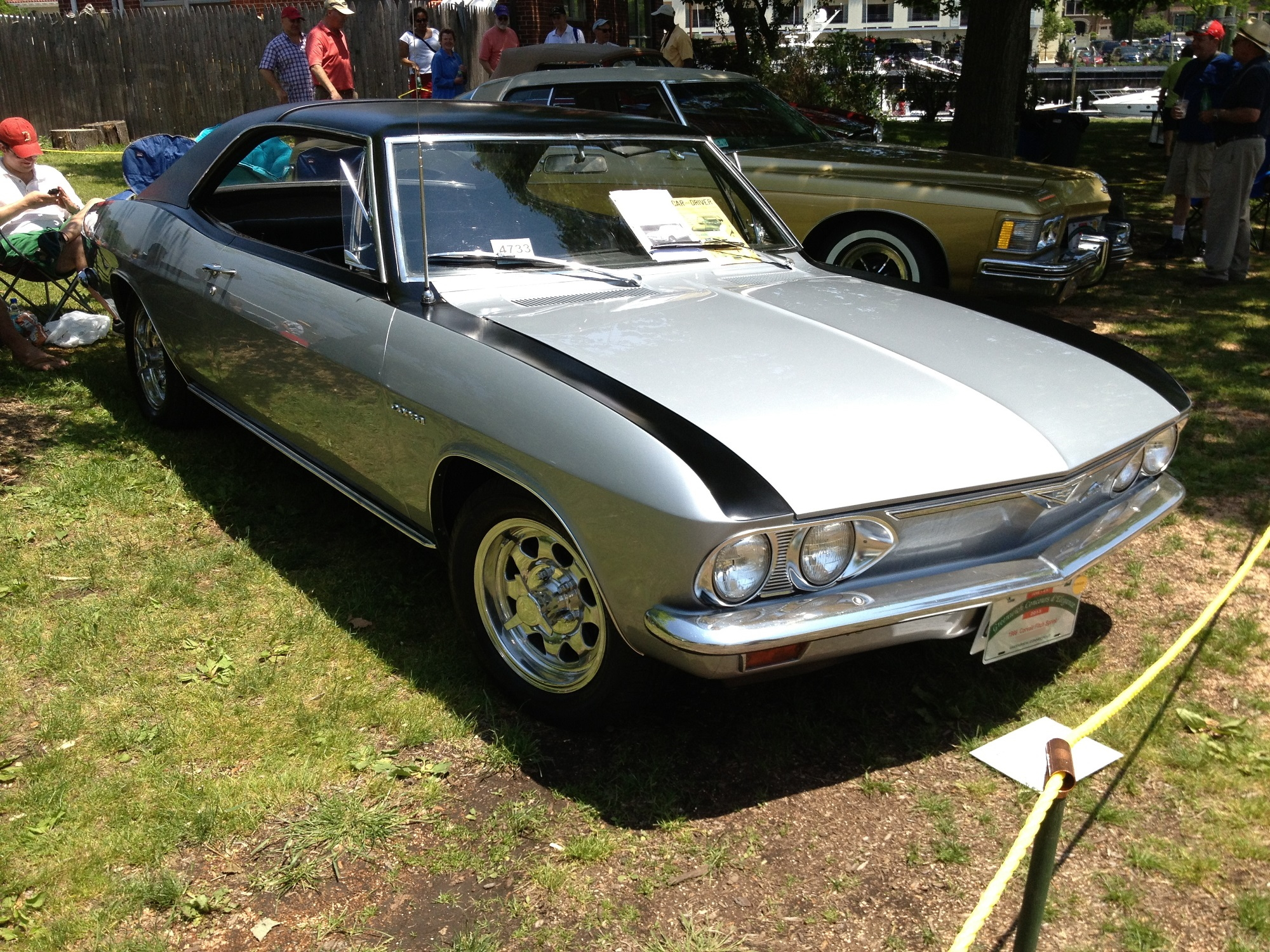
A 1965 Fitch Sprint

Longtime roadracer John Fitch was particularly interested in the Corvair as the basis for a spirited road and track-oriented car, due to its handling. The basic Sprint received only minor modifications to the engine, bringing it to 155 hp (116 kW; 157 PS), but upgrades to the shock absorbers and springs, adjustments to the wheel alignment, quicker steering ratio, alloy wheels, metallic brake linings, the obligatory wood-rimmed steering wheel (leather available for an additional $9.95), short-throw shifter and other such minor alterations made it extremely competitive with European sports cars costing much more. Racing stripes and front mesh gravel screen were available. Body options for the 1965-1969 cars such as spoilers were also available, but the most visually remarkable option was the "Ventop", a fiberglass overlay for the C-pillars and rear of the roof that gave the car a "flying buttress" profile.

Fitch went on to design and build a prototype of the Fitch Phoenix, a Corvair-based two-seat sports car, superficially resembling a smaller version of the Corvette-based Mako Shark. With a total weight of 1,950 lb (885 kg), even with a steel body, and with the Corvair engine modified with Weber carburetors to deliver 175 hp (130 kW; 177 PS), the car delivered spirited performance for $8,760. The ability to produce automobiles on a small scale, along with Chevrolet's decision to terminate production of the Corvair, meant the end of Fitch's plan. He still retained the prototype, and occasionally exhibited it at car shows until his death. On 1 June 2014, the Fitch Phoenix went to auction at Bonhams in the Greenwich Concours and sold for 230,000 US dollars. The car is still in Connecticut with the new owner.

In the early 1970s, Fitch sold his inventory to Art Hershberger of Princeton, Wisconsin. Hershberger made minor styling modifications to several Corvairs and sold them as Solar Sprints and Solar Cavaliers. The main distinguishing feature of the Solar was its Camaro taillights.

=== Winfield Reactor and Piranha ===
Automotive customizer Gene Winfield built two models in the mid-1960s that used the unique qualities of the lightweight and low Corvair engine.

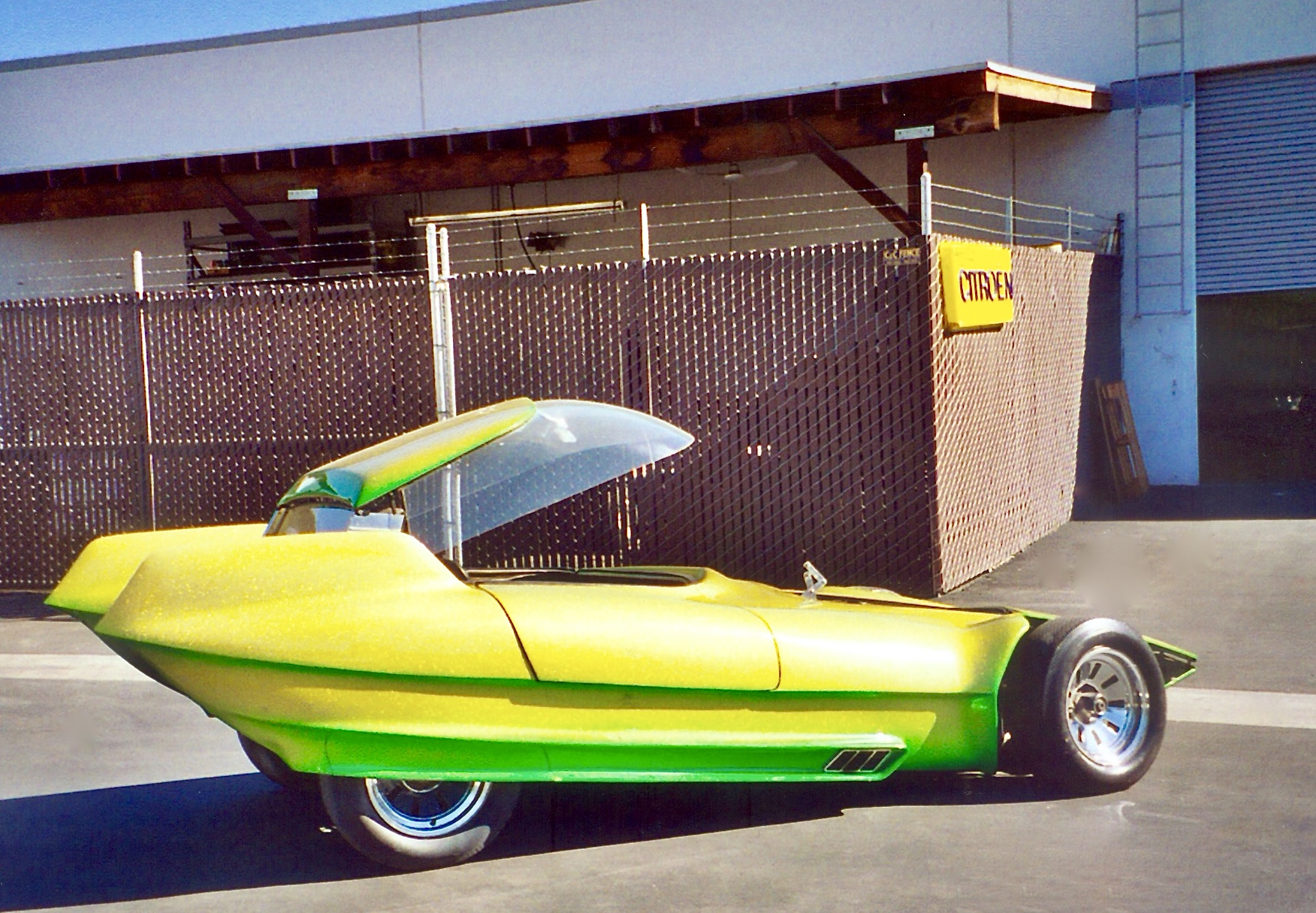
The Reactor

The Reactor came when Winfield was tasked with showing the benefits of an aluminum bodied car. What he developed was an extremely low slung two seat front-mid-engine, front-wheel-drive car. He used the 180 hp turbocharged engine from the Corvair Corsa. Other drivetrain components came from the Citroën DS, including the front wheel drive transaxle and height adjustable suspension. Winfield was able to place this vehicle in the 1960s television programs Star Trek, Batman, and Bewitched.

A sports racing car – the Piranha – was developed around the same time, to demonstrate the use of a new plastic for the structural parts of the automobile – Cyclic ABS. This lightweight (1,400 lb) vehicle was developed in several generations, using a rear-mounted Corvair engine. Model car company Aluminum Model Toys began small scale production of actual cars through their division run by Gene Winfield. Winfield was able to obtain feature placement of this car on television as The U.N.C.L.E. Car in The Man from U.N.C.L.E.

=== Custom, dune buggies and aircraft ===
Corvair flat-six engines were a popular alternative to Volkswagen engines in dune buggy applications and off-road racing. Corvair engines have been used to power light and experimental aircraft designs by Pietenpol, Zenith, and Sonex. Much development work on the conversion of Corvair engines into flight-worthy powerplants has been carried out by William Wynne, who among others has been refining the process since the 1980s.

=== Trans Am ===
A Corvair was driven by Spurgeon May and Donna Mae Mims in the Trans Am Series in 1966.

== See also ==
- Chevrolet Corvair Powerglide
- Fiat 1300
- Tatra 613

== Bibliography ==
- Cheetham, Craig (2005). The World's Worst Cars: From Pioneering Failures to Multimillion Dollar Disasters. Amber Books. ISBN 978-1904687351.
- Flory Jr., J. "Kelly" (2004). American Cars, 1960–1972: Every Model, Year by Year. McFarland. ISBN 978-0-7864-1273-0.
- Shattuck, Dennis, ed. (1963). Corvair – A complete Guide. A Car Life Special Edition. Chicago: Bond.
