= The Reactor (show rod) =

Show rod (car) built by Gene Winfield

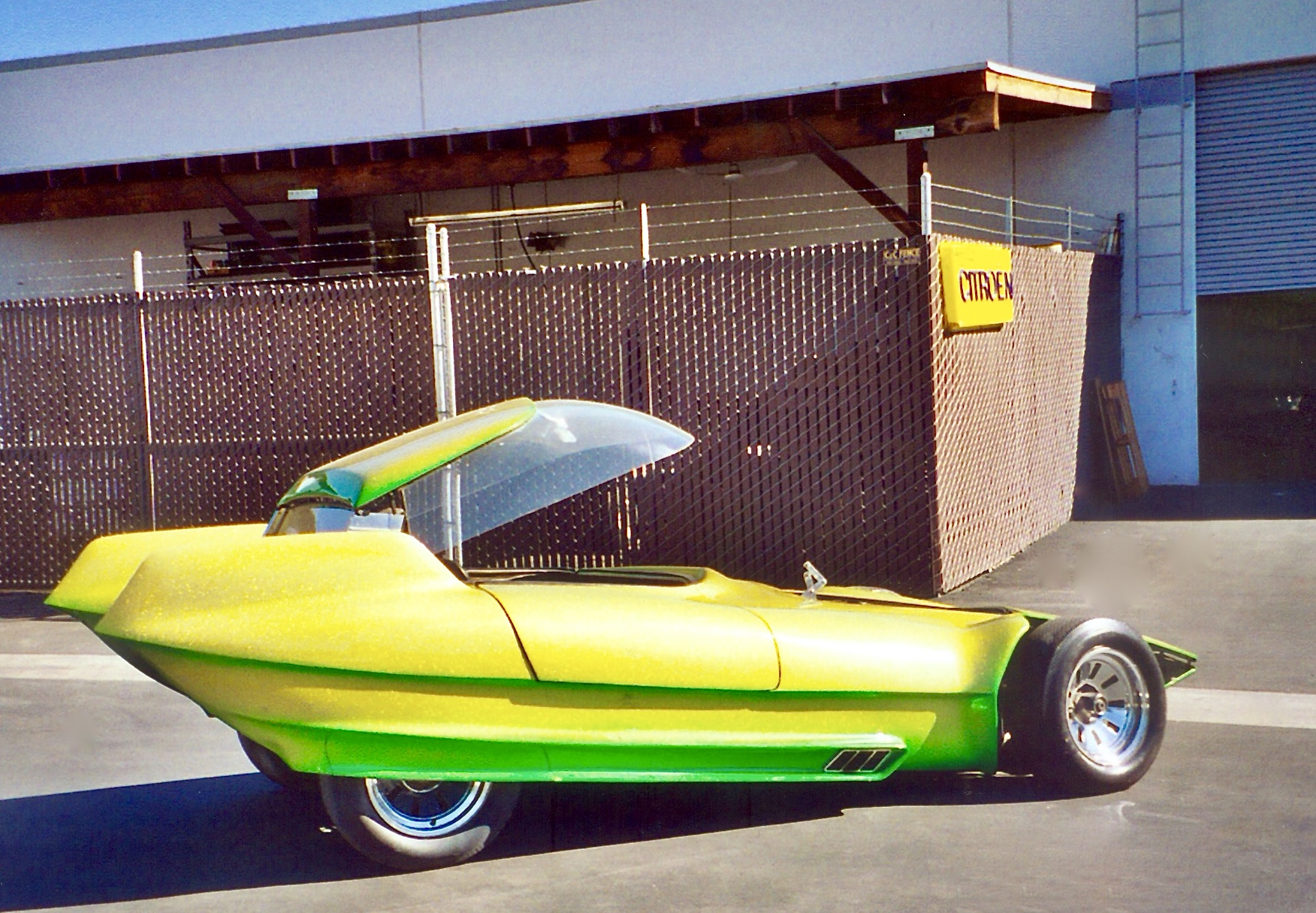
- The Reactor

Overview
- Manufacturer: Gene Winfield
- Also called: Autorama Special
- Model years: 1964
- Designer: Ben Delphia

Body and chassis
- Body style: 2-door
- Layout: Front-engined front wheel drive

Powertrain
- Engine: Chevrolet Turbo-Air 6 engine

The Reactor is a custom car built by Gene Winfield. The low slung car featured front wheel drive and height adjustable suspension. It appeared in episodes of four TV series: Bewitched, Star Trek, Batman, and Mission: Impossible.

== Origin ==
After completing construction of his Strip Star car, Winfield's next project was even more ambitious. Joe Kizis, an East Coast show promoter, held an annual Autorama, an indoor rod and custom car show in Hartford, Connecticut. Kizis gave Winfield a $20,000 commission to build an aluminum-bodied show car named the Autorama Special. Designed by Ben Delphia of The Art Center College of Design, this vehicle later became known as The Reactor. Winfield entered The Reactor in the 1966 Grand National Roadster Show where it won the Tournament of Fame Award.

== 1960s television appearances ==
Winfield brought The Reactor to Hollywood in 1966. “I didn’t know anybody” according to Winfield. He managed to show the car to the 20th Century Fox Studios transportation coordinator, and within two weeks the unique car had landed a television role.

- Bewitched, episode "Super Car" S3 E19 produced by Screen Gems.
- Star Trek, episode "Bread and Circuses" (as the Jupiter 8) S2 E25 produced by Paramount Television. At least 18 different publicity photos were taken with The Reactor and William Shatner.
- Batman, episode "The Funny Feline Felonies" (as the Catmobile) S3 E16 produced by 20th Century Fox Studios
- "Mission: Impossible", episode "The Freeze"

== Reactor today ==
Creator Gene Winfield owns The Reactor, which was shown on the lawn at the Pebble Beach Concours d'Elegance in 2017.

== Construction details ==
Reactor is a front-engined front wheel drive two seater. The bodywork, like that on Winfield's Strip Star, is of lightweight aluminum. The front wheels are exposed and fenderless, while the rears are enclosed by the bodywork and skirts. The roof panel is hinged at the rear and, together with the windshield, tilts up and back to give access to the interior.

Reactor was finished in a trademark Winfield fadeaway paint job, changing from metalflake gold on top to green below.

The car's low hoodline was made possible by its use of a version of the Chevrolet Turbo-Air 6 engine. A similar engine was used in The Man from U.N.C.L.E.'s Piranha.

Winfield took the air-cooled 180 hp (130 kW) turbocharged flat-six engine from a Corvair Corsa and mated it to the transmission of a 1962 Citroën ID 19, Winfield kept the wide front and narrow rear track of the donor Citroën, as well as its height adjustable hydropneumatic suspension, which enables the car's ground clearance to be varied from 4 to 9 1/2 inches (100 to 240 mm).

== Sources ==
- King, Jonnie. "Welcome to the Hall of Fame Legends Series!". Archived from the original on May 28, 2018.
