= Chevrolet C/K (first generation) =

American truck series by General Motors

First generation
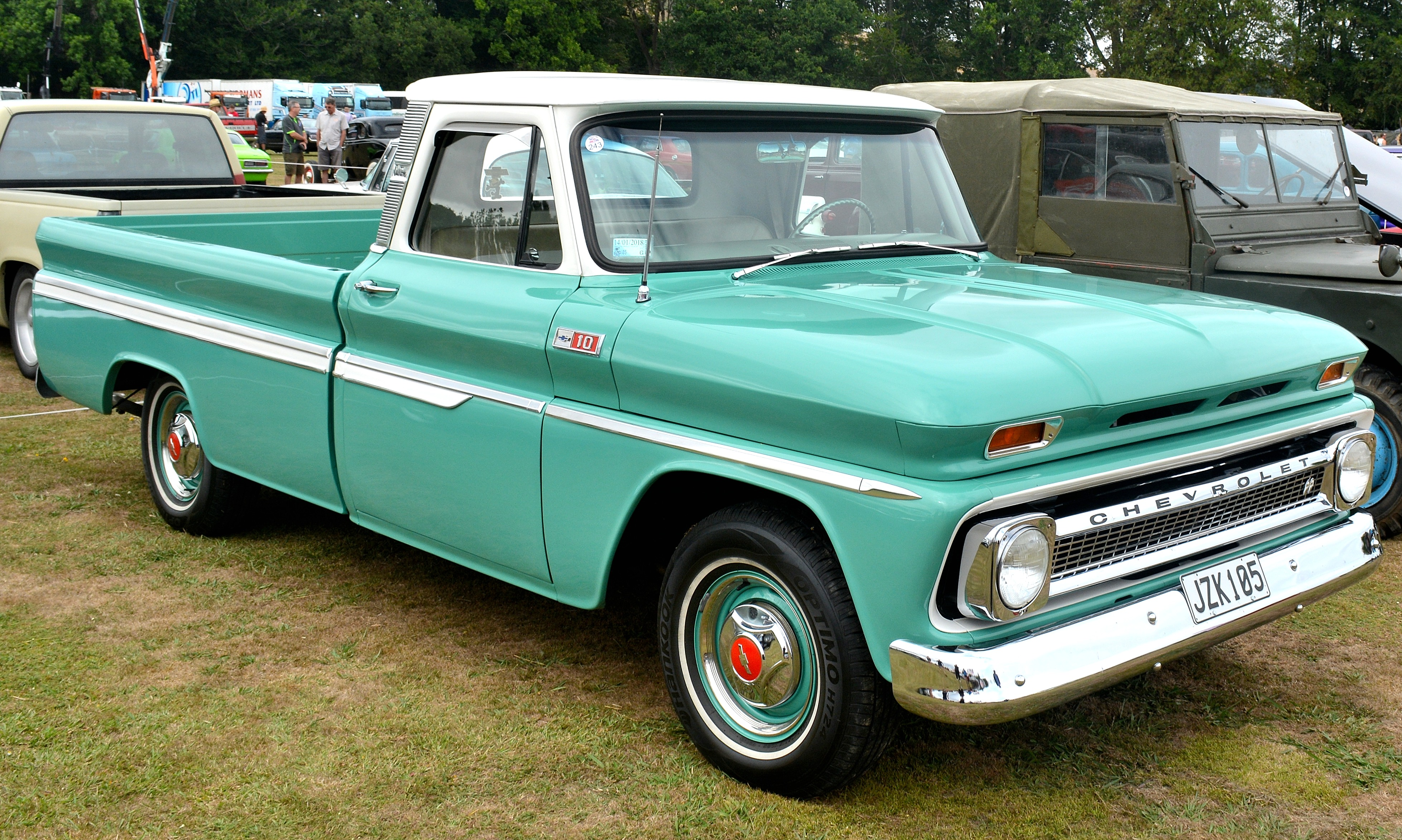
- 1965 Chevrolet C10 Fleetside

Overview
- Manufacturer: General Motors
- Also called: Chevrolet Apache (C10-40); Chevrolet Viking (C50-60); Chevrolet Spartan (C70-80); GMC: 1000/K1000, 1500/K1500, 2500, 3000-6500 (medium to heavy-duty)
- Model years: 1960–1966
- Assembly: List: United States: Baltimore Assembly, Baltimore, Maryland; Flint Truck Assembly, Flint, Michigan; Fremont Assembly, Fremont, California (Chevrolet & GMC: 1963–1966); Janesville Assembly, Janesville, Wisconsin; Lakewood Assembly, Lakewood Heights, Atlanta, Georgia; Leeds Assembly, Leeds, Kansas City, Missouri; Norwood Assembly, Norwood, Ohio; Oakland Assembly, Oakland, California (Chevrolet & GMC: 1960–1964); Pontiac West Assembly, Pontiac, Michigan (GMC only); St. Louis Truck Assembly, St. Louis, Missouri; North Tarrytown Assembly, North Tarrytown, New York; Van Nuys Assembly, Van Nuys, California; Canada: Oshawa, Ontario; Argentina: Buenos Aires
- Designer: Harley Earl (1957, 1958)

Body and chassis
- Related: Chevrolet/GMC Suburban

Powertrain
- Engine: 230 cu in (3.8 L) Chevrolet Turbo-Thrift I6; 236 cu in (3.9 L) Chevrolet Stovebolt I6; 250 cu in (4.1 L) Chevrolet Turbo-Thrift I6; 261 cu in (4.3 L) Chevrolet Stovebolt I6; 292 cu in (4.8 L) Chevrolet Turbo-Thrift I6; 305 cu in (5.0 L) GMC V6; 283 cu in (4.6 L) Chevrolet small-block V8; 327 cu in (5.4 L) Chevrolet small-block V8
- Transmission: 3-speed synchromesh manual; 4-speed synchromesh manual; 2-speed Powerglide automatic

Dimensions
- Wheelbase: 115 in (2,921 mm) (short box: 1/2-ton models); 127 in (3,226 mm) (long box: 1/2-ton & 3/4-ton models); 133 in (3,378 mm) (1-ton models)
- Length: 186.875 in (4,747 mm) SWB; 206 in (5,232 mm) Standard; 216.25 in (5,493 mm) LWB
- Width: 78.75 in (2,000 mm)
- Height: 71.25 in (1,810 mm)

Chronology
- Predecessor: Chevrolet Task Force
- Successor: Chevrolet C/K (Action Line)

The first generation of the C/K series is a range of trucks that was manufactured by General Motors from the 1960 to 1966 model years. Marketed by both the Chevrolet and GMC divisions, the C/K series replaced the previous Task Force generation of trucks. These are the first General Motors light trucks developed on a dedicated truck platform (no longer a derivative of the GM A platform); the C/K series included pickup trucks, chassis-cab trucks, and medium/heavy commercial trucks.

Unlike previous GM truck lines, the 1960 C/K was not given an official generational name. As part of the new model nomenclature introduced by GMC, C denoted two-wheel-drive and K denoted four-wheel-drive. Replacing second-party conversions, the four-wheel drive was offered as a factory-supplied option for the first time. Alongside pickup trucks, the C/K light truck line served as the basis of the fifth generation of the Chevrolet Suburban/GMC Carryall, which was marketed as either a truck-based wagon (SUV) or a panel van.

Produced by multiple sites across the United States and Canada, the model line was also produced in South America. For the 1967 model year, GM introduced a second generation of the C/K, naming it the "Action-Line" series.

== Model overview ==
The first-generation C/K trucks were produced from the 1960 to 1966 model years. For 1963, the model line underwent a mechanical revision, with a more substantial update to the body for the 1964 model year.

=== Chassis ===
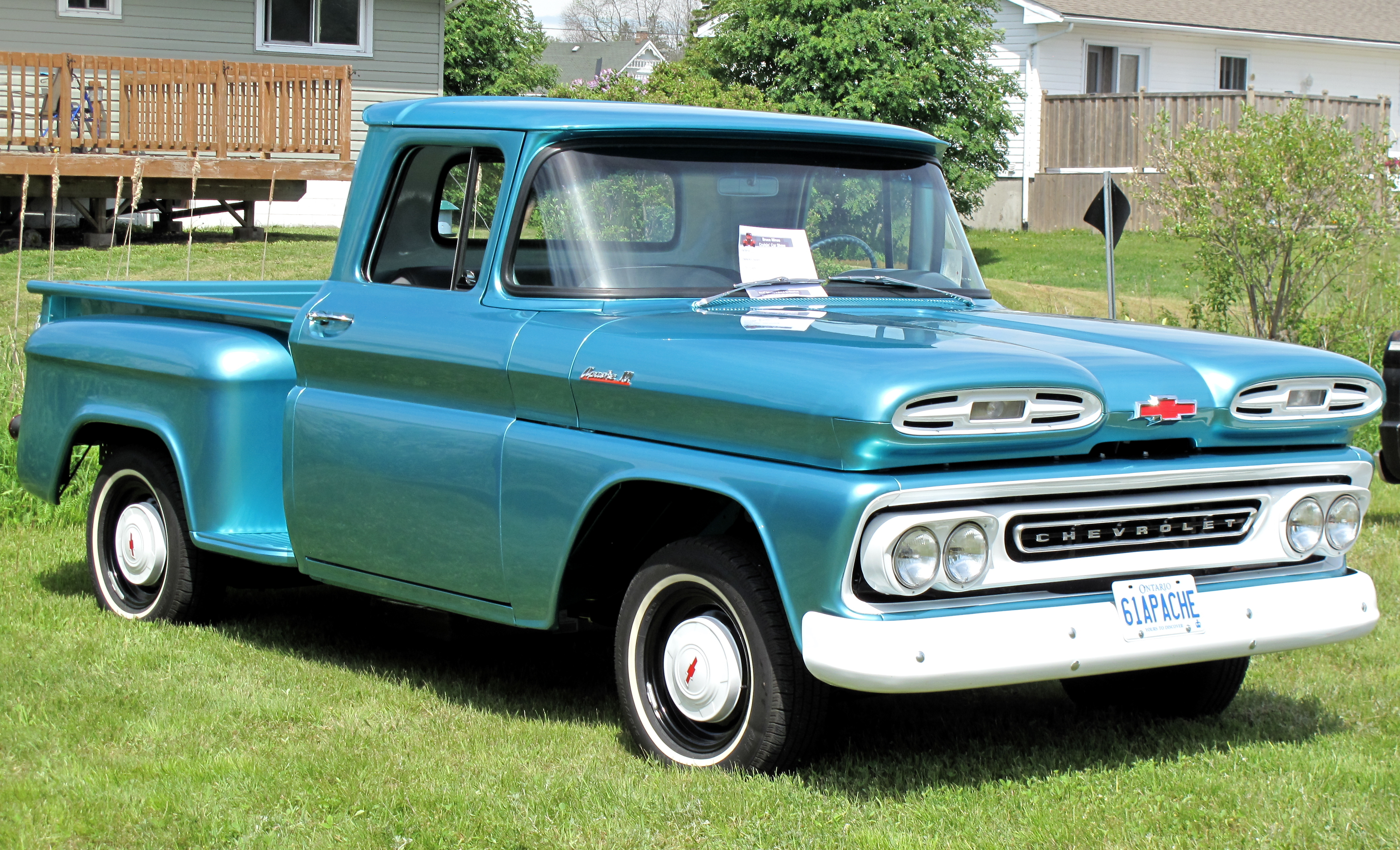
1961 Chevrolet Apache C10

The first-generation C/K trucks are built using body-on-frame construction. Diverging from light truck design precedent, the C/K ended its use of straight frame rails, adopting a drop-center design; 1/2-ton and 3/4-ton trucks used a hybrid of an X-frame and perimeter-frame layout, while 1-ton trucks used a drop-center ladder frame.

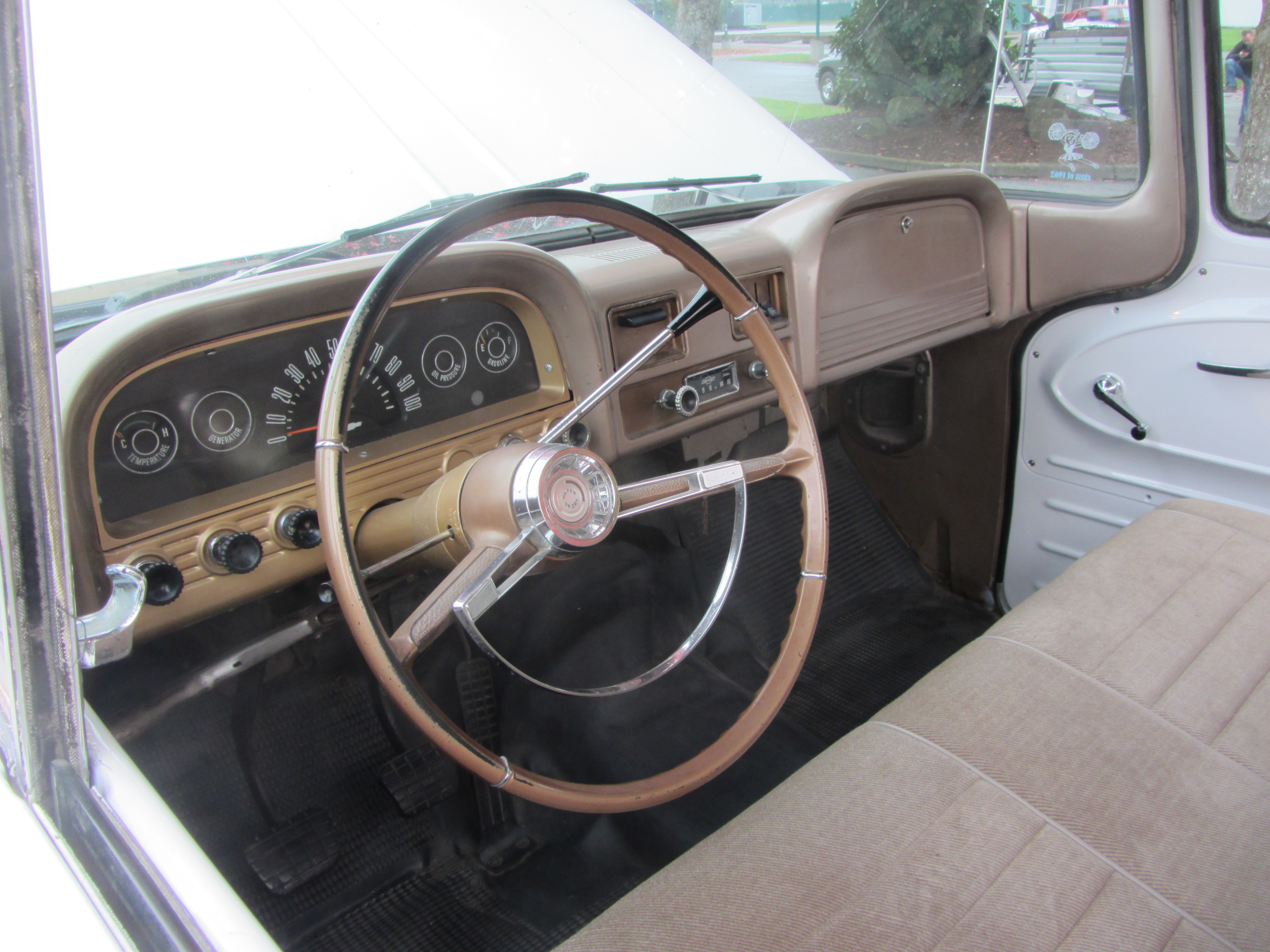
1962 Chevrolet C10 interior

While more complex in design, the drop-center frame was stronger (necessitated by the upgraded suspension); the all-new layout also accommodated upgrades including mounting the cab seven inches lower, which allowed for a lower center of gravity, improved stability, and easier entry.

Pickups were offered in three wheelbases: 115 in (2,921 mm) for half-ton trucks with 6.5 ft (2.0 m) beds, 127 in (3,226 mm) for half- and 3/4-ton trucks with 8 ft (2.4 m) beds, and 133 in (3,378 mm) for 1-ton trucks with 9 ft (2.7 m) beds.

==== Suspension ====
In a major departure of design precedent in light trucks, independent front suspension replaced the traditional beam front axle, supported by control arms and torsion bar springs. Two rear suspension configurations were offered for the C/K. A coil-sprung rear axle with rear-trailing control arms was standard; a leaf-sprung axle was standard on 1-ton trucks and above. As an option, the coil-spring rear axle was offered with optional rear auxiliary leaf springs.

For 1963, the front suspension was redesigned; to save space and improve durability, coil springs replaced the torsion bar springs.

==== Powertrain ====
In 1960, C/K trucks were powered by three different engines. A 236-cubic-inch I6 (producing 135 hp) was the standard engine for Chevrolet models, with a 305-cubic-inch V6 (producing 150 hp) as standard for GMCs; a 283 cubic-inch V8 was optional, producing 160 hp.

In 1962, an alternator became an option for the model line.

In 1963, Chevrolet trucks received two new inline-6 engines, replacing the 236. A 230 cubic-inch six became the base engine (producing 140 hp), while a 292 cubic-inch six (producing 165 hp) was introduced as an option; the 283 V8 carried over but was retuned to 175 hp. Developed primarily for heavier-duty use, the 292 six closely matched the GMC V6 in output and saw use in the C/K series through the mid-1980s.

In 1965, Chevrolet trucks received an optional 327 cubic-inch V8, producing 220 hp. Initially offered for 3/4-ton and 1-ton trucks, the 327 was offered for all pickups for 1966. For 1966, the 230 six was replaced by a 250-cubic-inch inline-6 (155 hp); alongside the 292 six, the 250 would serve as the standard C/K engine into the 1980s.

1960–1966 C/K (pickup truck) powertrain details
Engine	Engine family	Production	Fuel system	Output (gross)		Notes
Engine	Engine family	Production	Fuel system	Horsepower	Torque	Notes
230 cu in (3.8 L) I6	Chevrolet Turbo-Thrift engine	1963-1965	1-bbl	140 hp @ 4400 RPM	220 lb-ft @ 1600 RPM	
235.5 cu in (3.9 L) I6	Chevrolet Stovebolt engine	1960-1962	1-bbl	135 hp	217 lb-ft	
250 cu in (4.1 L) I6	Chevrolet Turbo-Thrift engine	1966	1-bbl	155 hp @ 4200 RPM	235 lb-ft @ 1600 RPM	
261 cu in (4.3 L) I6	Chevrolet Stovebolt engine	1960-1962	1-bbl	150 hp @ 4000 RPM	235 lb-ft @ 2000 RPM	
283 cu in (4.6 L) V8	Chevrolet small-block engine	1960-1966	2-bbl	160 hp	270 lb-ft	
292 cu in (4.8 L) I6	Chevrolet Turbo-Thrift engine	1963-1966	1-bbl	165 hp @ 3800 RPM	280 lb-ft @ 1600 RPM	
305 cu in (5.0 L) V6	GMC V6 engine	1960-1966	1-bbl	150 hp @ 3600 RPM 165 hp @ 3800 RPM	260 lb-ft @ 1600 RPM 280 lb-ft @ 1600 RPM	GMC only 305A: 1960–1961; 305D: 1961 (optional), 1962; 305E: 1963–1966
327 cu in (5.4 L) V8	Chevrolet small-block engine	1965-1966	4-bbl	220 hp @ 4400 rpm	320 lb-ft @ 2800 rpm	1965: 20-30 series 1966: 10-30 series

=== Body design ===
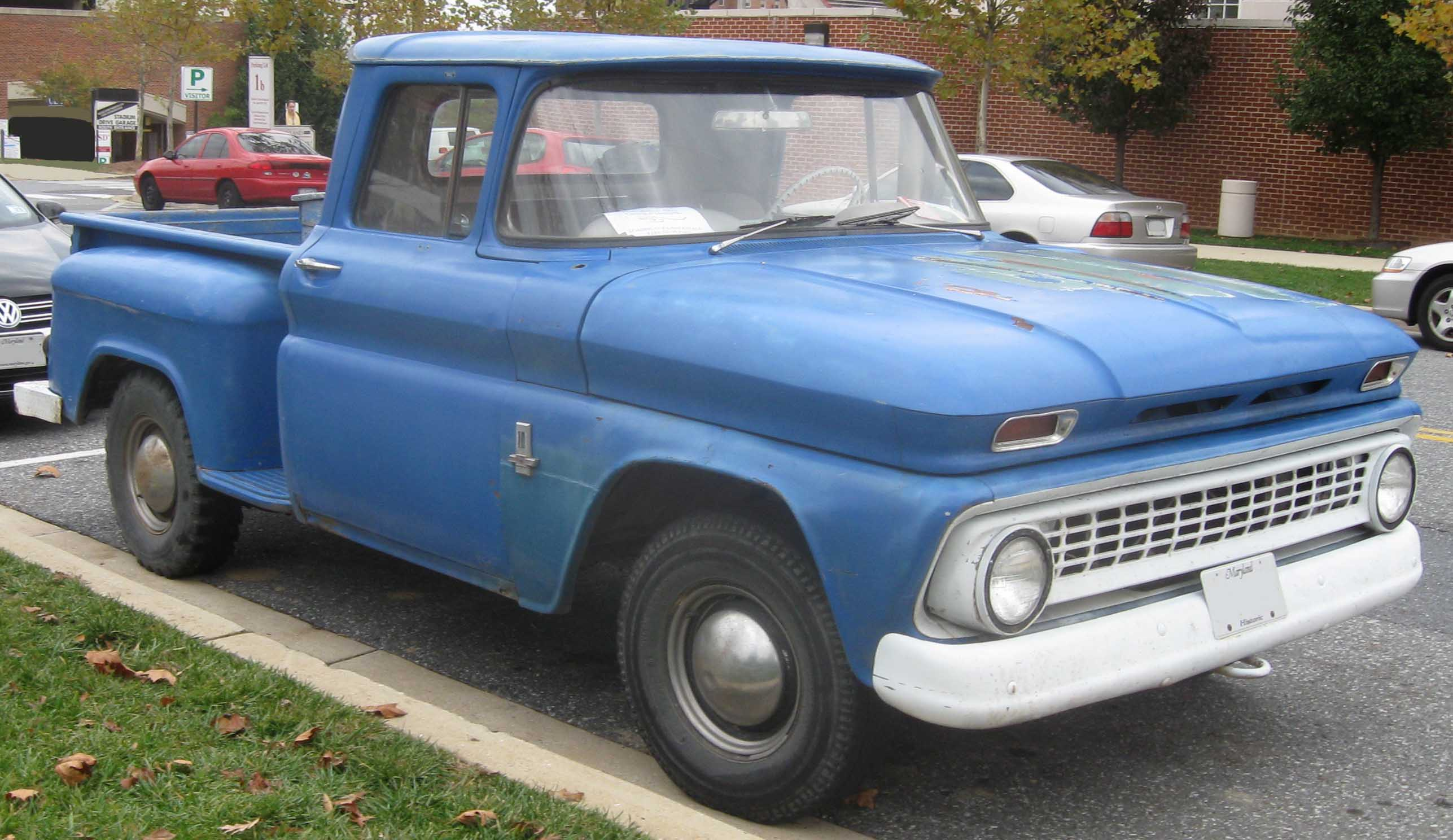
1963 Chevrolet C10 Stepside

Like its predecessors, the first-generation C/K was offered solely as a two-door regular cab. The straight-sided Fleetside bed made its return alongside the traditional fendered Stepside bed (GMC Wideside and Fenderside, respectively).

Both the Fleetside and Stepside were offered 6 1/2-foot and 8-foot bed lengths; a 9-foot bed length was exclusive to Stepside pickups.

In 1962, the hood was restyled, eliminating the large oval air intakes above a revised grille; two small intake slots were added along with front turn signals above the grille; for 1963, the grille underwent an additional revision.

In 1964, the cab underwent a major update. While sharing the roof and floor structure, the windshield and A-pillar were redesigned, eliminating the intrusive "dogleg" (requiring new set of door stampings); the redesign also brought a change to the dashboard and door panels.

From 1965 to 1966, the model line saw few fundamental changes to the body, with air conditioning becoming an option for the first time.

=== Trim ===
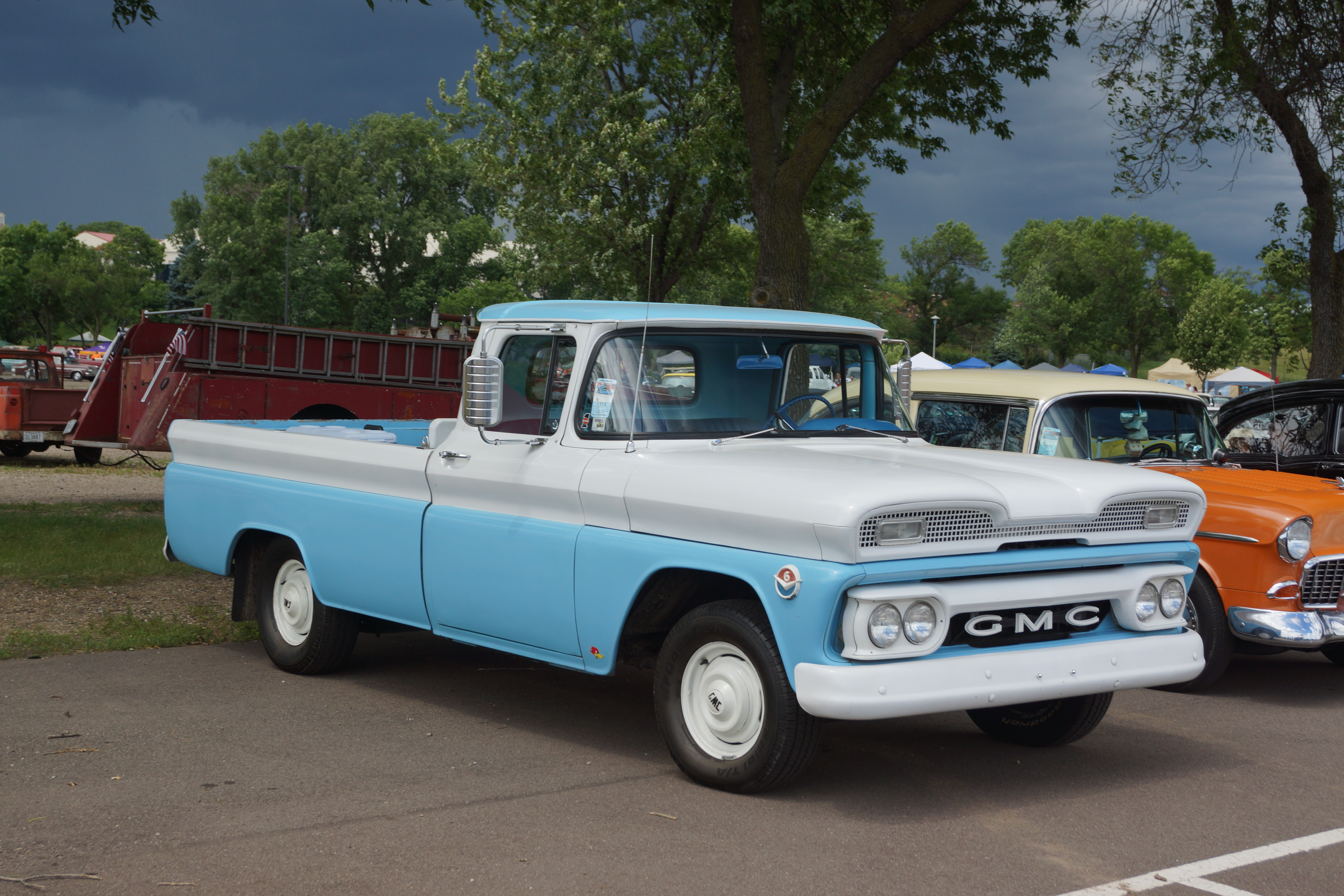
1960 GMC 1000

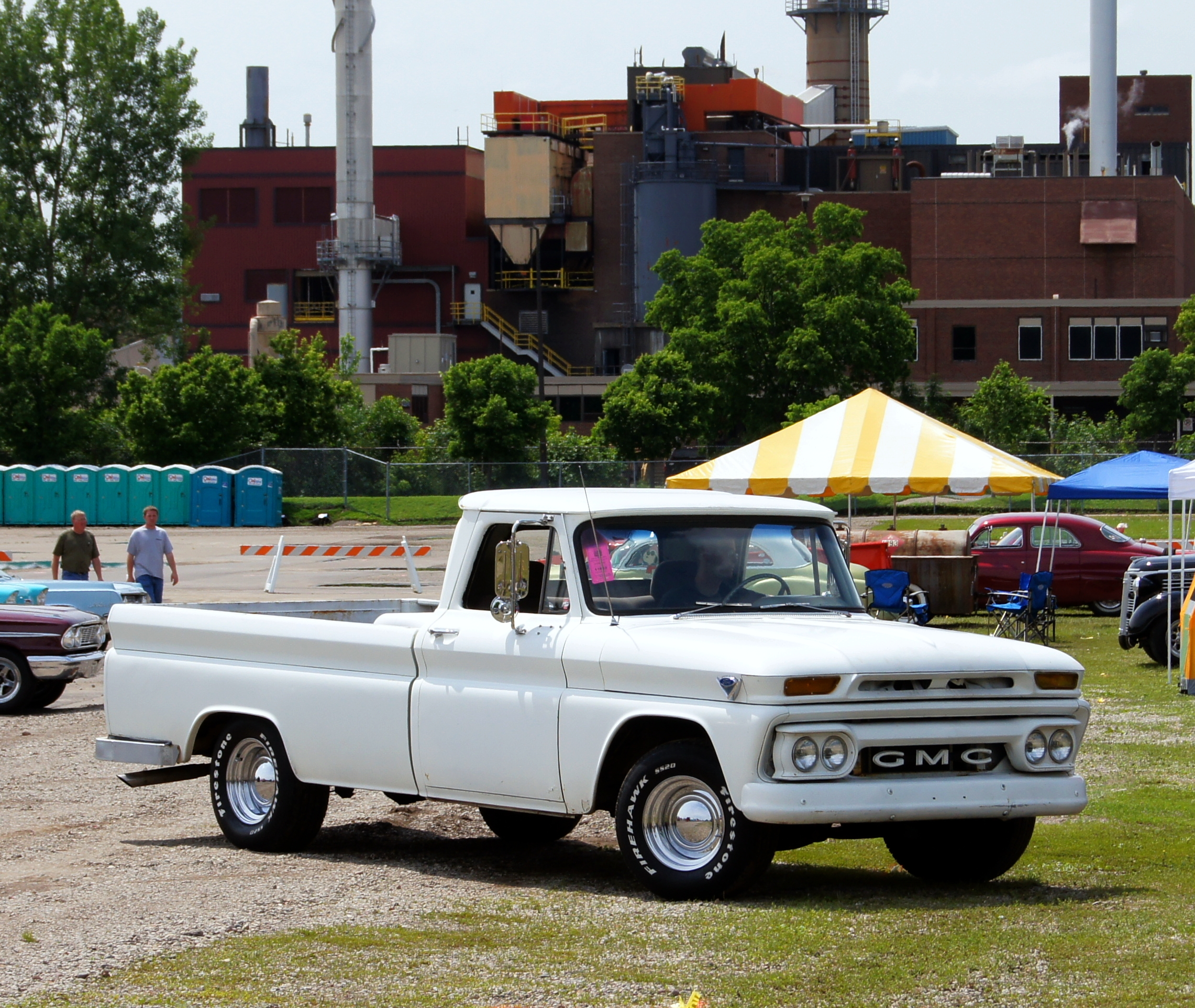
1965-1966 GMC 1000 "Wideside"

A nomenclature introduced by GMC, the C/K trucks were part of a wider naming system used by General Motors, as P denoted a forward-control chassis (used for delivery trucks), L was for low-cab COE, M was for tandem-axle conventional, and S denoted a cowled (school bus) chassis.

==== Chevrolet ====
With this series, GM reorganized its model designation system for Chevrolet trucks. The previous 3100, 3200, and 3600 designations for short 1/2-ton, long 1/2-ton and 3/4-ton models were dropped, replaced with 10, 20, and 30 for 1/2, 3/4, and 1-ton (nominal) payload ratings, and medium and heavy trucks offered from 40 through 80 series (see below).

For 1960 and 1961, Chevrolet adopted the series names from the Task Force trucks onto the C/K, with the lighter-duty 10-40 series trucks badged as "Apache", 50-60 series trucks as "Viking", and the largest 70-80 series as "Spartan".

The Chevrolet model line had a single trim level, offering optional "Custom" trim upgrades.

==== GMC ====
In 1960, GMC also reorganized its model designation system. To distinguish itself from Chevrolet, GMC used a four-digit system, using 1000, 1500, 2500, and 3000 for 1/2, 3/4, 1, and 1 1/2-ton (nominal) payload ratings. The 1 1/2 Chevrolet C40 and GMC 3000 (offered only as chassis-cab and stake truck) used the light-duty cab, lasting only through the 1963 model year. While GMC did not use the C designation, it used the K designation on 4×4 trucks.

In contrast to Chevrolet, GMC offered two trim levels, a standard "Deluxe" and an upgrade "Custom Cab".

== Variants ==
=== Utility vehicles ===
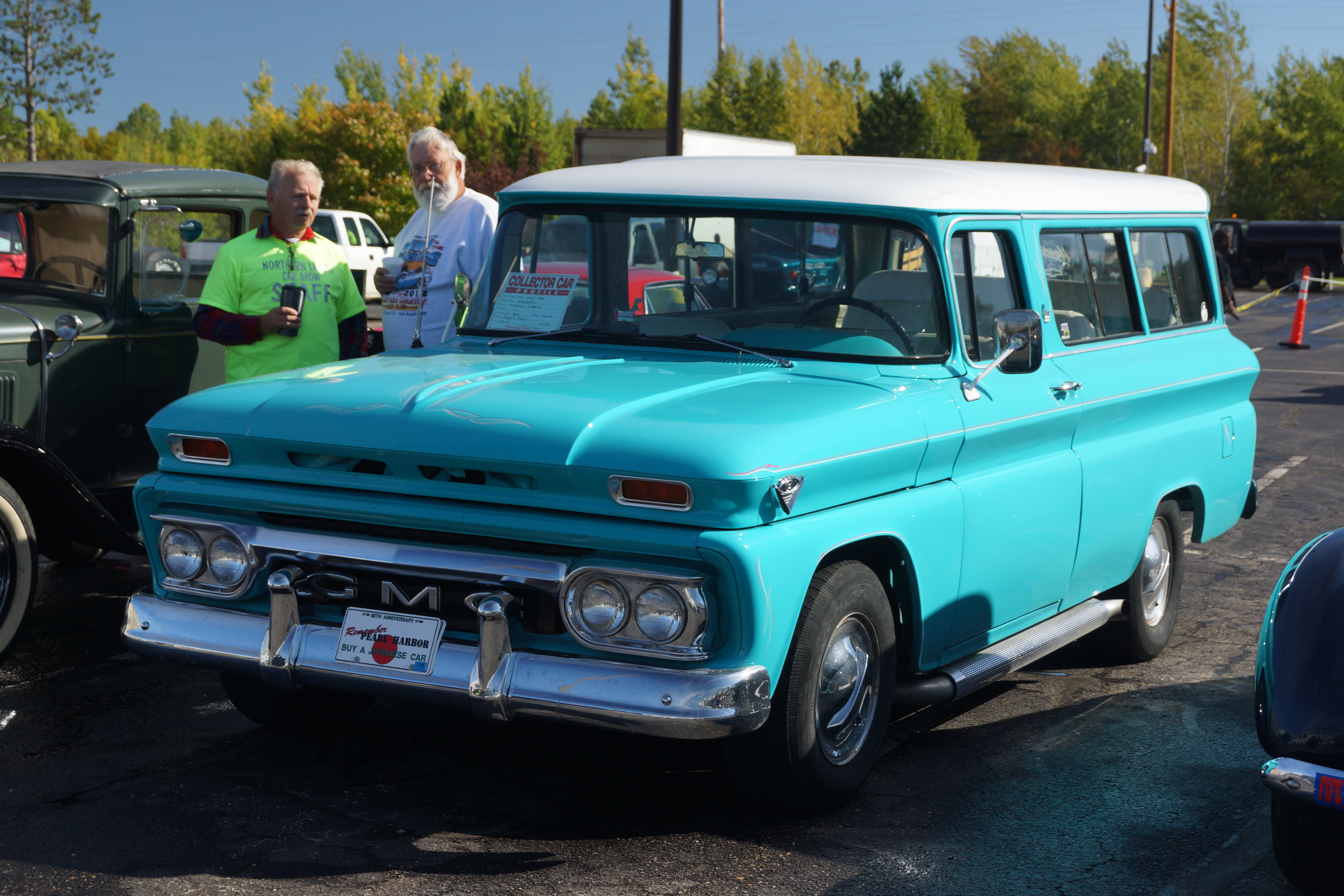
1962 GMC Suburban Carryall Custom

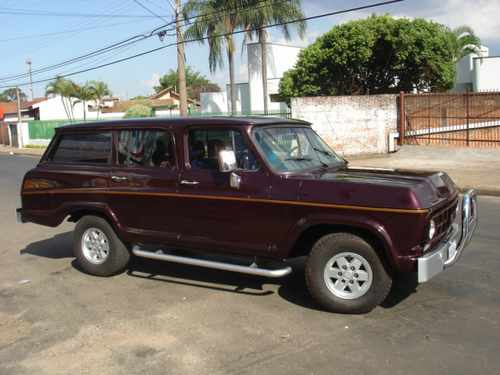
Chevrolet Veraneio (Brazil, 1964-1988)

The first-generation C/K formed the basis of the fifth-generation Chevrolet Suburban/GMC Carryall. Sharing the mechanical upgrades of the C/K truck chassis, the Suburban received factory fitment of four-wheel drive, independent front suspension on rear-wheel drive "C" models, and continued to share body and mechanical commonality with its pickup counterpart.

Built only as a two-door utility wagon, the Suburban and Carryall were offered in 1/2-ton 10-series and 3/4-ton 20-series; a 1-ton C30 Suburban panel van was offered as an option.

From 1964 to 1988, the Chevrolet Veraneio was produced by GM Brazil as a five-door truck-based wagon. Derived from the C-14 pickup (itself loosely based on the first-generation C/K, sharing an instrument panel and other components), the Veraneio featured a 5-door layout two generations before its American Suburban counterpart did in 1973.

=== Medium- & heavy-duty models ===
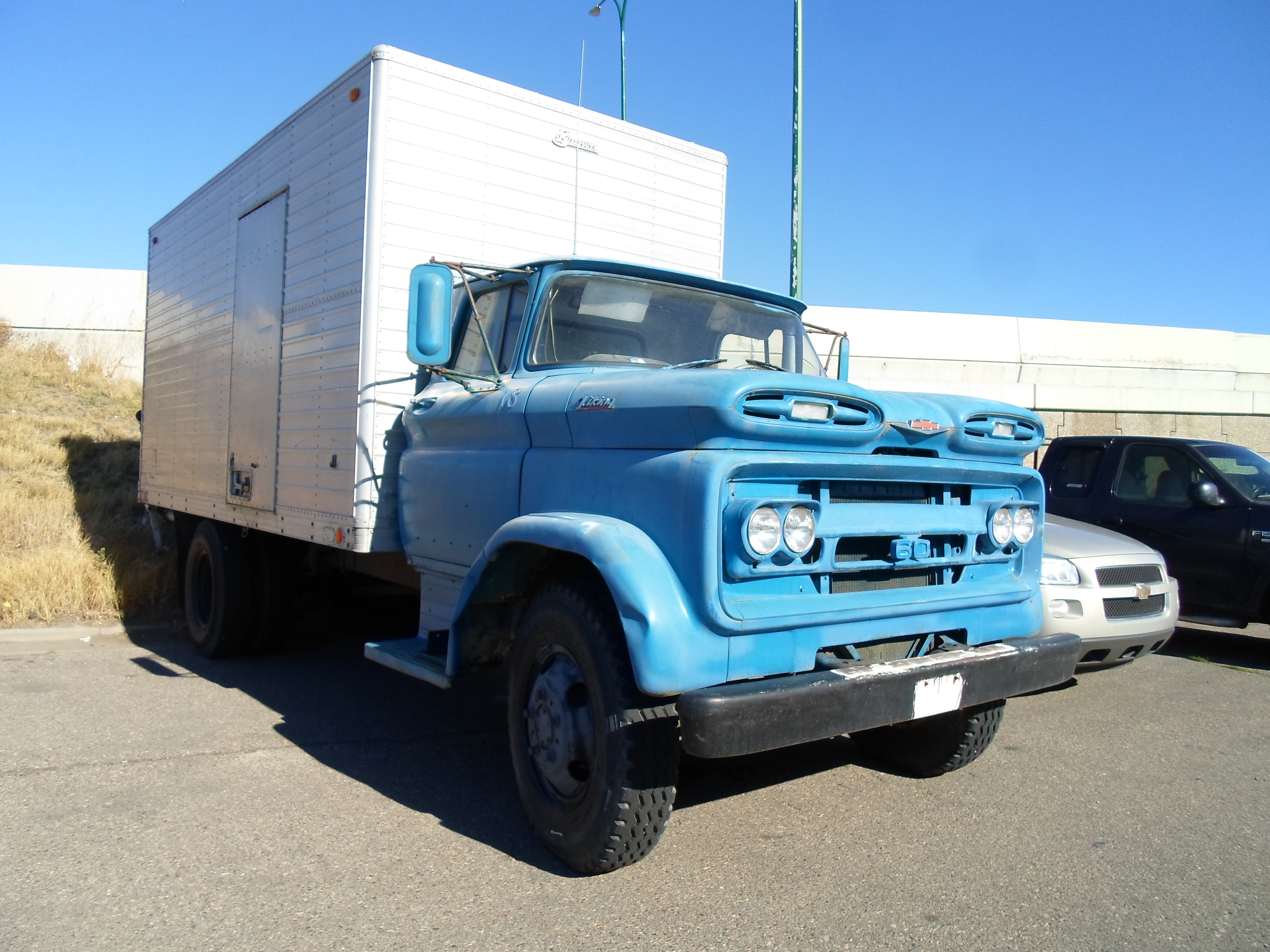
1961 Chevrolet L60 Viking (Short-hood conventional)

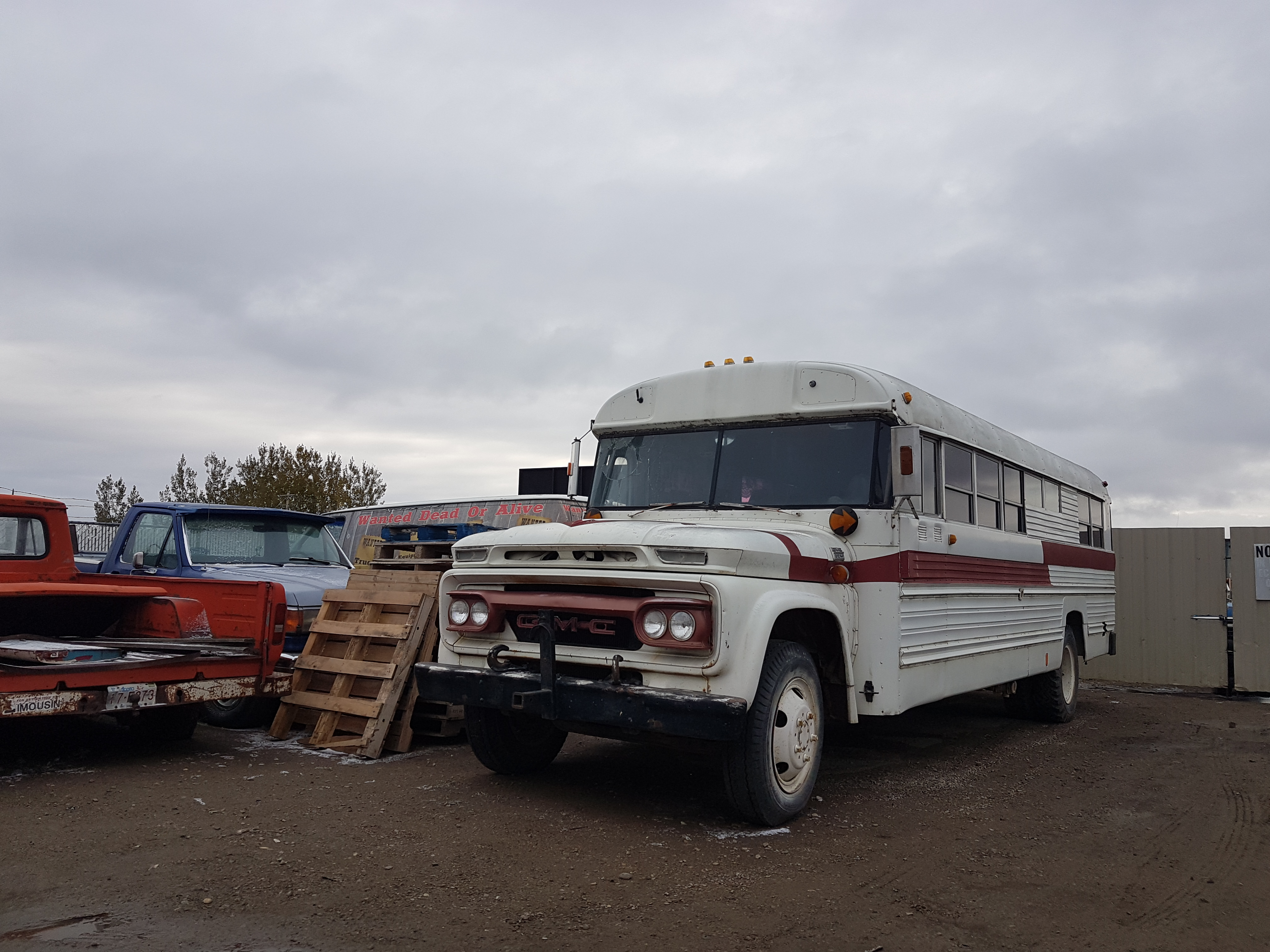
1962-1965 GMC S6000 (cowled bus chassis)

Above the C/K pickup truck range and the 1 1/2-ton Chevrolet C40/GMC 3000, General Motors marketed its medium-duty and heavy-duty truck ranges. While designed with straight frame rails and heavier-duty chassis components (though retaining its independent front suspension), the medium-duty C50 and C60 (GMC 3500, 4000, 5000) shared a common cab design with the C/K pickup trucks. Several variants of the medium-duty range were produced, including the L-series short-hood conventional and S-series cowled bus chassis. A heavier-duty version of the C60 (the C60-H) expanded its GVWR from 19,500 lbs to 22,000 lbs.

The heavy-duty C-series range expanded from chassis-cab trucks to include conventional semitractors of multiple configurations, with Chevrolet offering the C60-H, C70, and C80 (GMC 5500/6000/6500). The short-hood L-series was also offered in the same size ranges, with the tandem rear-axle M-series (GMC W-series).

Medium-duty trucks were:

- 1 1/2-ton Chevrolet C40 / GMC 3000 (1960–62), with the light-duty cab;
- Chevrolet C50 and C60;
- GMC 3500, 4000 and 5000.

Heavy-duty trucks were:

- Chevrolet C60-H (a C60 with a heavier GVWR: 22,000 lbs instead of 19,500 lbs), C70 (1960–61) and C80;
- Chevrolet tandem rear axle models M60 (1963–66), M70 (1960–61) and M80 (1962–66);
- GMC 5500, 6000 and 6500;
- GMC tandem rear axle models W5000, W5500 and W6500.
