= Barry R. Davis =

American statistician

- Alma mater: Massachusetts Institute of Technology (B.S., 1973); University of California, San Diego School of Medicine (M.D., 1977); Brown University (Ph.D., 1982)
- Known for: HDFP, SHEP, ALLHAT, SPRINT
- Awards: Fellow of the American Statistical Association (1996); Fellow of the American Association for the Advancement of Science (2014); Delta Omega National Honorary Member (2026)
- Scientific career
- Fields: Biostatistics, Clinical trials, Preventive medicine
- Workplaces: UTHealth Houston School of Public Health
- Thesis: A Neurobiological Approach to Machine Intelligence (1982)
- Doctoral advisor: Stuart Geman
- Doctoral students: Susan Halabi

Barry Robert Davis is an American statistician and public health doctor specializing in the design, conduct, and analysis of clinical trials. He is Professor Emeritus of Biostatistics and Data Science at the University of Texas School of Public Health, where he served as Director of its Coordinating Center for Clinical Trials. He served as President of the Society for Clinical Trials in 2000 and as Chair of the Biometrics Section of the American Statistical Association in 2003.

== Education and career ==
Davis earned a B.S. degree from the Massachusetts Institute of Technology in 1973., an M.D. from the University of California, San Diego, School of Medicine, and a Ph.D. in Applied Mathematics under the supervision of Stuart Geman in the Division of Applied Mathematics at Brown University in 1982, based on his dissertation entitled "A Neurobiological Approach to Machine Intelligence." He joined the Division of Applied Mathematics at Brown University as an assistant professor in 1982 and moved in 1983 to the University of Texas School of Public Health where he ultimately was the Guy S. Parcel Chair of Public Health, Professor of Biostatistics and Data Science, and Director of the Coordinating Center for Clinical Trials.

Davis had leadership roles in four influential hypertension clinical trials: the Hypertension Detection and Follow-up Program (HDFP), the Systolic Hypertension in the Elderly Program (SHEP), the Antihypertensive and Lipid Lowering Treatment to Prevent Heart Attack Trial (ALLHAT) and the Systolic Blood Pressure Intervention Trial (SPRINT); and in stem cell therapy trials for treating heart disease, the Cardiovascular Cell Therapy Research Network.

== Book ==
In 2026, Johns Hopkins University Press published Davis's book, The Preventioneers: Diseases, Disasters, and the Discoveries That Changed Our World. It examines historical developments in public health and safety, including infectious disease prevention, automobile safety, cardiovascular disease prevention, tobacco control, suicide prevention, and climate change.

== Recognition ==
Davis became a Fellow of the American Statistical Association in 1996, a Fellow of the Society for Clinical Trials in 2007, a Fellow of the American Association for the Advancement of Science in 2014 for "distinguished contributions to the methodology of clinical trials; the design, monitoring, management, and reporting of influential clinical trials; and leadership to advance public health", and an elected member of the International Statistical Institute in 2015. In 2004 he received the University of Texas Health President's Scholar's Award for his leadership role in the ALLHAT Clinical Trial. He is also a Fellow of the American Heart Association, the American Society of Hypertension, and the American College of Preventive Medicine.

In 2026, Davis was selected as a National Honorary Member of Delta Omega, the honorary society for public health. The recognition cited his leadership in cardiovascular clinical trials, expertise in biostatistics, dedication to preventive medicine, and contributions to public advocacy.
