= GMC Caballero =

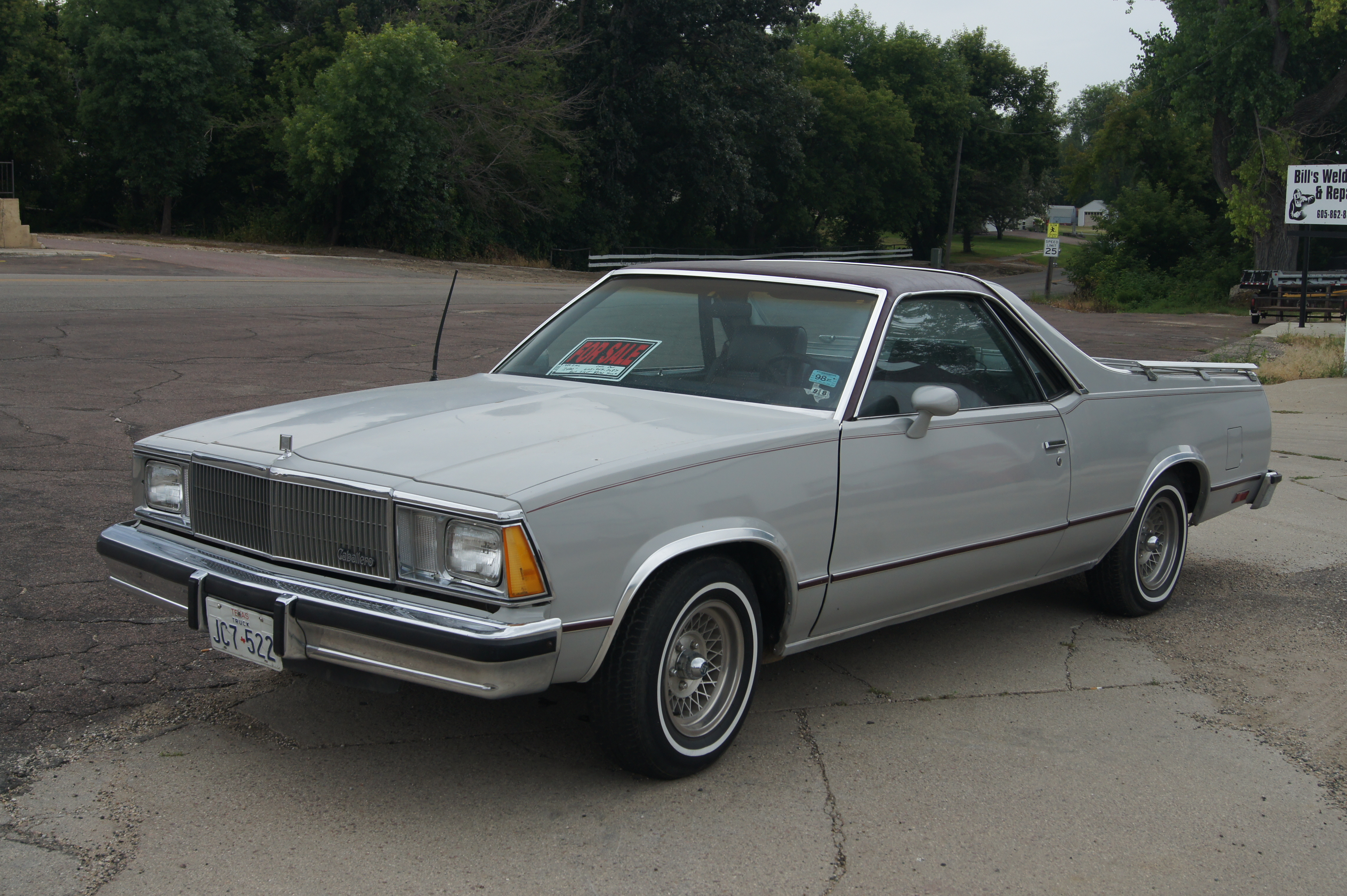
- 1980 GMC Caballero

Overview
- Manufacturer: GMC (automobile)
- Production: 1977–1987
- Model years: 1978–1987
- Assembly: Arlington, Texas, United States, (Arlington Assembly: 1978–1984); Doraville, Georgia, United States, (Doraville Assembly: 1978–1981); Fremont, California, United States, (Fremont Assembly: 1978–1981); Leeds, Kansas City, Missouri, United States, (Leeds Assembly: 1978–1980); Ramos Arizpe, Coahuila, Mexico, (Ramos Arizpe Assembly: 1985–1987)

Body and chassis
- Class: Pickup truck
- Body style: Coupé utility
- Layout: Front-engine, rear-wheel-drive
- Platform: A-body (1978–1981); G-body (1982–1987)
- Related: Chevrolet El Camino; Chevrolet Malibu

Powertrain
- Engine: 3.8 L (229 cu in) Chevrolet V6; 3.8 L (231 cu in) Buick V6; 4.3 L (262 cu in) Chevrolet V6; 4.4 L (267 cu in) Small-Block V8; 5.0 L (305 cu in) Small-Block V8; 5.7 L (350 cu in) Small-Block V8
- Transmission: 3-speed Saginaw manual 4-speed manual 3-speed THM200 automatic 3-speed THM350 automatic 4-speed THM200-4R automatic

Dimensions
- Wheelbase: 117 in (2,972 mm)

Chronology
- Predecessor: GMC Sprint

The GMC Caballero (replacing the GMC Sprint) is a coupé utility / pickup truck produced by GMC from the 1978 model year to 1987.

The rear-wheel-drive car-based pickups were sold by GMC Truck dealers primarily in the United States and Canada as the GMC version of the Chevrolet El Camino. Trim designations, emblems, and wheel trim differentiate the GMC from the Chevrolet. The vehicles were built on the General Motors A platform through 1981; for 1982, it was re-designated the G platform as the A platform switched to front-wheel drive.

== History ==
The Caballero and the fifth generation El Camino shared their mechanical parts with the Chevrolet Malibu series, but rode on a 9-inch longer wheelbase. Exterior appearance remained largely the same over the truck's nine-year lifespan, with the biggest changes through the years coming mostly in the form of grille design. From 1978 through 1981, this consisted of either "eggcrate" style (1978), horizontal bars (1979 and 1981) or vertical bars (1980). Then for 1982, the front end was changed to a full-width grille design housing four headlights and a four-row crosshatch pattern; this persisted through the vehicle's demise in 1987.

Caballero interiors featured a bench seat in standard models, though an upgrade to bucket seats with a center console and floor-mounted shifter was available. Most models with automatic transmission carried the shifter on the steering column. Cloth or vinyl upholstery choices were offered in a variety of colors. The instrument panel originally featured a "strip" style of speedometer, with the needle making a long sweep across a horizontal line of numbers to indicate speed. This was changed for 1981 to a more conventional round dial format, with some further minor tweaks for 1986. The 1987 model year was the end of the line for GM's North American coupe utilities, which included 420 leftover El Caminos and 325 Cabelleros that were reported first sold in 1988.

=== Laredo and Amarillo ===
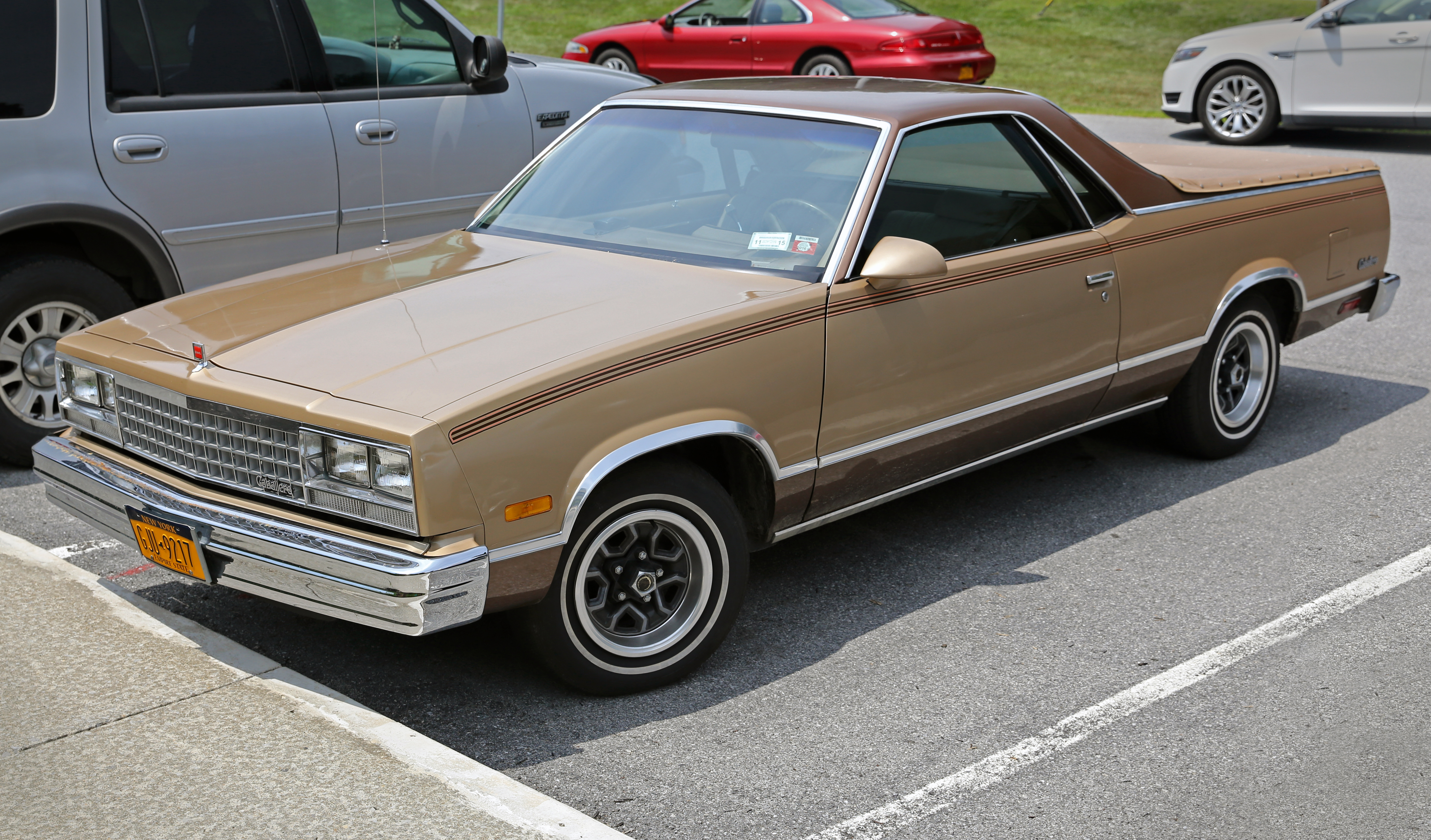
1987 GMC Caballero Amarillo, the last model year. This front design was used from 1982 until 1987.

Offered from 1978 until 1980 only, the Laredo was a Caballero equivalent to the El Camino's luxurious Conquista package. Equipment included two-tone paint in various color combinations and a "Laredo" decal on the tailgate.

For 1981, the Laredo became known as the Amarillo, and this name would continue through 1987. With the exception of the different name decal on the tailgate, the package was substantially the same. GMC changed this package's name at about the same time as Jeep began using the "Laredo" name (as a trim level with the 1980 CJ-7) for a variety of special models in their own line - later evolving into a trim package with its XJ Cherokee and the midlevel (later base) trim level with the Grand Cherokee.

=== Diablo ===
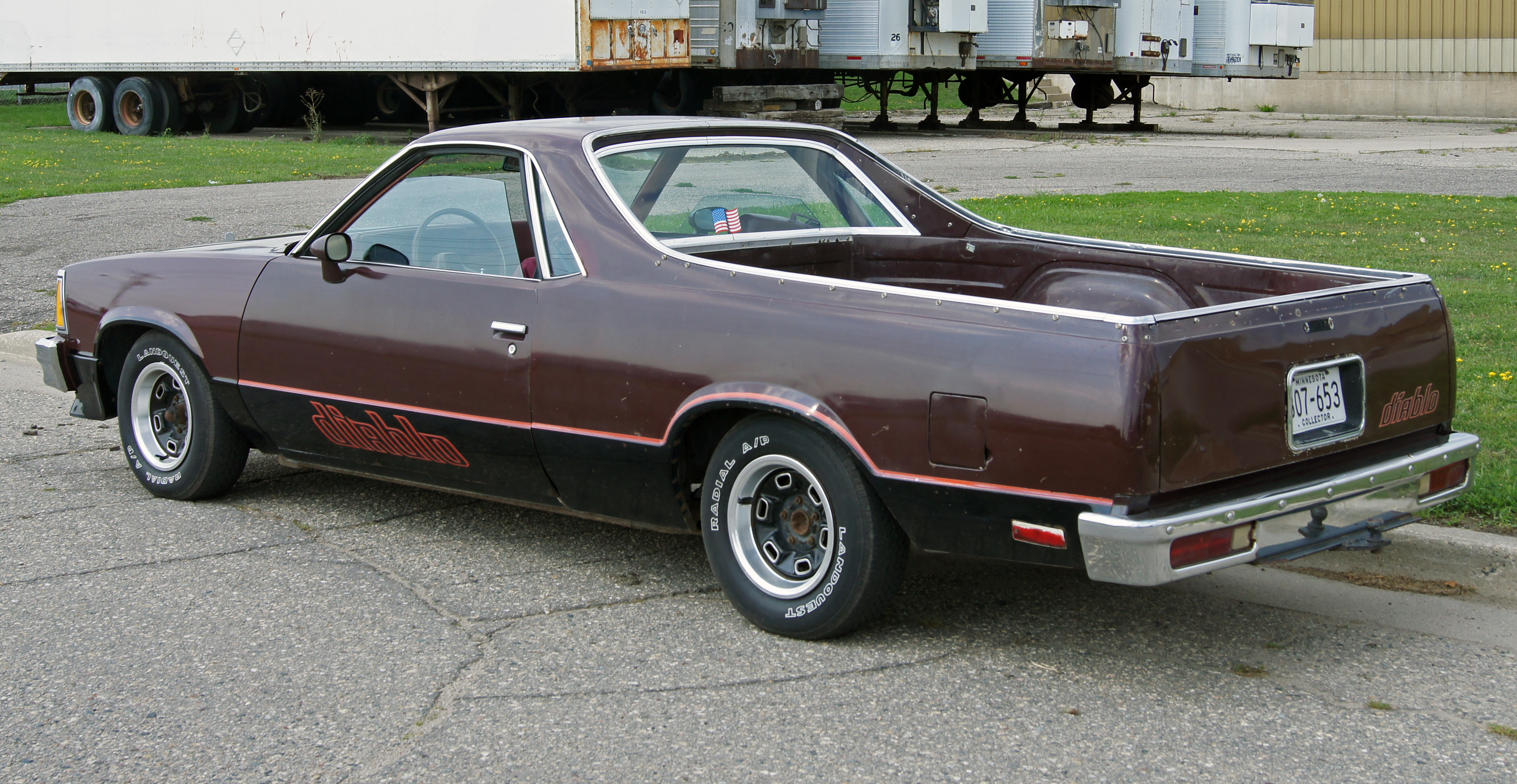
1979 GMC Caballero Diablo

The sporty Diablo package began in 1978 as an equivalent to the El Camino's Black Knight (1978)/Royal Knight (post-1978) package (which was, in turn, an upgrade from the long-running Super Sport package). Both the Royal Knight and the Diablo carried a hood graphic not unlike that featured on the Pontiac Trans Am; the Diablo's was in a symmetrical flame pattern that resembled a demon. Besides the hood accents, Diablo also came with lower-body accent paint, body-color mirrors, black-trimmed window frames, a front air dam, color-matched "Rally" steel wheels with trim rings, and a large "Diablo" decal on the tailgate.

When Chevrolet dropped the Royal Knight option from the El Camino option list for 1982, GMC's Diablo remained but was now analogous to the "normal" Super Sport model. This meant that the flame decal was gone, but little else changed. However, when the El Camino Super Sport gained a new dealer optioned aerodynamic front end from Choo Choo Customs for 1984, the Diablo stuck with the same front end it had carried since the final factory front clip revision (for the Malibus, El Caminos and Caballeros) from 1982. The Diablo was offered through the end of the Caballero line in 1987.

Available Engines:

- 200 CID 2bbl V6 (1978-1979)
- 229 CID 2bbl V6 (1980-1981)
- 231 CID 2bbl Buick V6 (1978-1981)- for California cars only
- 267 CID 2bbl V8 (1979-1981)
- 305 CID 2bbl V8 (1978 only)
- 305 CID 4bbl V8 (1979-1981)
- 350 CID 4bbl V8 (1978-1979)

=== Nameplate ===
The word "Caballero" is from the Spanish language. Its most common definition today in the Americas is "gentleman", though its technical definition is "horseman" (caballo meaning horse) or "knight". These are, in turn, related to the English "cowboy" (though the more appropriate Spanish equivalent of "cowboy" would be vaquero, based on "vaca" for "cow"). The Caballero name was previously used as a top trim level on the hardtop Buick Century station wagon.

GMC's use of a Spanish-derived name was perhaps a response to the El Camino's own borrowing from Spanish colonial history (via the assumed reference to El Camino Real, the "King's Road", lit. "Regal Road"). Until 1979, Ford offered a similar vehicle, the Ford Ranchero, also with a Spanish name ("Rancher"). GMC also offered special trim packages for the Caballero under other Spanish names: Diablo, Laredo, Amarillo. As for the previous nameplate, GM would later revive the Sprint name for a rebadged Suzuki Cultus sold under the Chevrolet banner.

== Modern revival ==
General Motors executive Robert Lutz announced in January 2008 that the division was to display a GMC-badged version of the Holden Crewman, a four-door version of the standard Holden Ute, at the New York Auto Show in March. Ultimately, the intended show vehicle eventuated was quite different, in the GMC Denali XT concept, designed by Holden upon the Zeta platform, but bearing no resemblance to existing Holden product. It debuted at the 2008 Chicago Auto Show, but plans for production based upon the unibody concept were subsequently cancelled circa September 2009.

== See also ==
- Dodge Rampage
- Ford Ranchero
- Subaru BRAT
