= Christine Graffigne =

French applied mathematician

Christine Graffigne (born 1959) is a French applied mathematician. She is known for her pioneering research on Markov random fields for image analysis, the topic of her 1986 invited address (joint with Stuart Geman) to the International Congress of Mathematicians.

== Education and career ==
Graffigne earned a double Ph.D., in 1986 from Paris-Sud University with the dissertation Applications des statistiques au traitement d'images supervised by Dominique Picard, and in 1987 from Brown University with the dissertation Experiments In Texture Analysis And Segmentation supervised by Geman.

She is a professor in the MAP5 (Applied Mathematics at Paris 5) Laboratory, formerly at Paris Descartes University and now part of the University of Paris. At Paris Descartes University, she directed the Information Technology and Mathematics Training and Research Unit (UFR de Mathématiques et Informatique) until 2019, when she was succeeded in this position by David Janiszek.
