= Arlington Assembly =

Automobile factory owned by General Motors

- Operated: 1954–present
- Location: 2525 E Abram Street; Arlington, Texas
- Coordinates: 32.7383°N 97.0736°W
- Industry: SUVs
- Products: Automobiles
- Employees: 5,641 (2022)
- Area: 250 acres (1.0 km^{2})
- Volume: 5,075,000 sq ft (471,500 m^{2})
- Owner: General Motors
- Website: gm.com/arlington

Arlington Assembly is an automotive assembly plant in Arlington, Texas, United States, owned and operated by General Motors. It currently assembles the Chevrolet Tahoe, Suburban, GMC Yukon, and Cadillac Escalade full-size SUVs for the North American market.

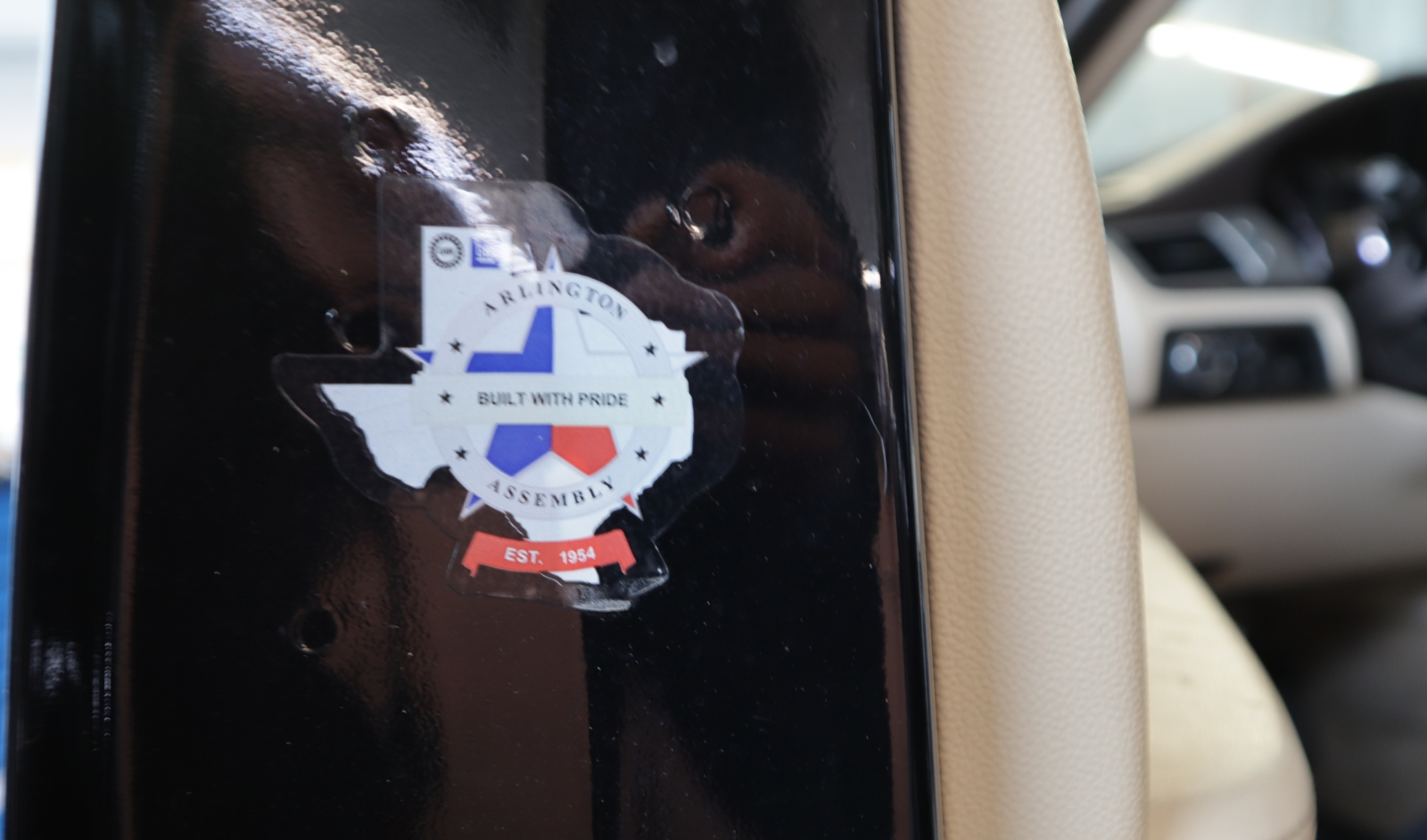
Arlington Assembly label on the driver's door of a Cadillac Escalade (GMT926)

The Arlington plant was opened in 1954 to assemble both automobiles and aircraft, but has focused on the former use for most of its history. Arlington Assembly was originally part of the Buick-Oldsmobile-Pontiac Assembly Division and was used to assemble Buicks, Oldsmobiles, and Pontiacs. The Buick-Oldsmobile-Pontiac Assembly Division was renamed General Motors Assembly Division in 1965 after it also began to assemble Chevrolet cars in 1963. Early automobile production included models like the Pontiac Chieftain and later, the Chevrolet Bel Air. The factory would continue to produce many large GM cars through the 1990s including products from Buick, Oldsmobile, Chevrolet and Cadillac. Arlington Assembly was the last GM B-body manufacturing facility when GM decided to consolidate operations and convert the plant to SUV production. The plant occupies 250 acres (1,000,000 square meters). Arlington Assembly has produced models for all of GM's primary American brands: Chevrolet, Pontiac, Oldsmobile, Buick, Cadillac, and GMC.

The first GM factory in the "Dallas-Ft. Worth" area was originally built in 1917 to build the Chevrolet Series 490 and the Chevrolet Series F on the south side of West Seventh Street and Slayton Street just west of Trinity Park. Due to a flood of the Trinity River in 1922 and flood control taxes levied by the local government, GM closed the factory in 1924 and in 1929 Leeds Assembly opened in Kansas City, Missouri. The Chevrolet Motor Company Building in Dallas replaced the Trinity Park facility from 1923 until 1935 and was replaced by the more advanced Arlington Factory in the early 1950s.

== Vehicles produced ==
=== Current ===
Since 2020 (2021 model year), Arlington Assembly manufactures large SUVs based on GM's GMT T1XX platform:

- Chevrolet Tahoe
- Chevrolet Suburban
- GMC Yukon/Yukon Denali
- GMC Yukon XL/Yukon XL Denali
- Cadillac Escalade
- Cadillac Escalade ESV

=== Former ===
- RWD GM full-size A platform & GM B platform vehicles
  - Buick Century (1955-1958)
  - Buick Invicta
  - Buick Le Sabre
  - Buick Roadmaster sedan (1992–1996)
  - Buick Roadmaster Estate wagon (1994–1996)
  - Buick Special (1955-1958)
  - Chevrolet Bel Air (1963–1970)
  - Chevrolet Biscayne (1963–1970)
  - Chevrolet Caprice (1966-1970, 1988–1996)
  - Chevrolet Impala (1963–1970)
  - Chevrolet Impala SS (1994–1996)
  - Oldsmobile 88
  - Oldsmobile Custom Cruiser (1988–1990)
  - Oldsmobile Starfire
  - Pontiac 2+2
  - Pontiac Bonneville
  - Pontiac Catalina
  - Pontiac Chieftain
  - Pontiac Grand Prix (1962-1968)
  - Pontiac Grand Ville
  - Pontiac Star Chief
  - Pontiac Ventura
- RWD GM C platform vehicles
  - Buick Electra
  - Buick Limited (1958)
  - Buick Roadmaster (1955-1958)
  - Buick Super
  - Oldsmobile 98
- RWD GM A platform vehicles (intermediate)
  - Chevrolet Chevelle SS (1970-1972) - Some SS models were painted a shade of yellow shared with some Oldsmobiles and used a different sequential production number unlike other Chevelles produced at other GM assembly plants
  - Chevrolet Chevelle (1973-1977)
  - Chevrolet El Camino (1973-1981)
  - Chevrolet Malibu (1978–1981)
  - Chevrolet Monte Carlo (1970–1981)
  - GMC Caballero (1978-1981)
  - GMC Sprint (1973-1977)
  - Oldsmobile Cutlass 1968-1981
  - Oldsmobile 442
- RWD GM G platform vehicles
  - Buick Regal (1982–1983)
  - Chevrolet El Camino (1982-1984)
  - Chevrolet Malibu (1982–1983)
  - Chevrolet Monte Carlo (1982–1987)
  - GMC Caballero (1982-1984)
  - Oldsmobile Cutlass Supreme (1979-1981, 1984–1987)
- RWD GM D platform vehicles
  - Cadillac Brougham (1988–1992)
  - Cadillac Fleetwood (1993–1996)
- GMT400 light trucks
  - Chevrolet C/K (1998-2000)
  - GMC Sierra (1998-2000)
- GMT400 sport utilities
  - Chevrolet Tahoe (1998-1999)
  - Chevrolet Tahoe Limited and Z71 (2000)
  - GMC Yukon (1998-1999)
  - GMC Yukon Denali (1999-2000)
  - Cadillac Escalade (1999-2000)
- GMT800 sport utilities
  - Chevrolet Tahoe (2001-2006)
  - Chevrolet Suburban (2001-2005)
  - GMC Yukon (2001-2006)
  - GMC Yukon XL (2001-2005)
  - Cadillac Escalade (2002-2006)
- GMT900 sport utilities
  - Chevrolet Tahoe (2007–2014)
  - Chevrolet Suburban (2007–2014)
  - GMC Yukon (2007–2014)
  - GMC Yukon Denali (2009-2014)
  - GMC Yukon XL (2007–2014)
  - GMC Yukon XL Denali (2009-2014)
  - Cadillac Escalade (2007–2014)
  - Cadillac Escalade ESV (2007–2014)
- GMT K2XX sport utilities
  - Chevrolet Tahoe (2015–2020)
  - Chevrolet Suburban (2015–2020)
  - GMC Yukon/Yukon Denali (2015–2020)
  - GMC Yukon XL/Yukon XL Denali (2015–2020)
  - Cadillac Escalade (2015–2020)
  - Cadillac Escalade ESV (2015–2020)

=== Milestone vehicles ===
These are the milestone vehicles produced by Arlington Assembly:

- 1 millionth vehicle: 1965 Pontiac Bonneville
- 2 millionth vehicle: 1971 Oldsmobile Cutlass
- 3 millionth vehicle: 1976 Oldsmobile Cutlass Supreme
- 4 millionth vehicle: 1981 Chevrolet Monte Carlo
- 5 millionth vehicle: 1985 Chevrolet Monte Carlo SS
- 6 millionth vehicle: 1993 Buick Roadmaster
- 7 millionth vehicle: 2002 Cadillac Escalade
- 8 Millionth vehicle: 2006 Chevrolet Tahoe
- 9 Millionth vehicle: 2011 Chevrolet Suburban
- 10 millionth vehicle: 2015 Chevrolet Suburban
- 11 millionth vehicle: 2018 Chevrolet Tahoe RST
- 12 millionth vehicle: 2021 Chevrolet Suburban
- 13 millionth vehicle: 2024 Cadillac Escalade-V
