= GMC Sprint =

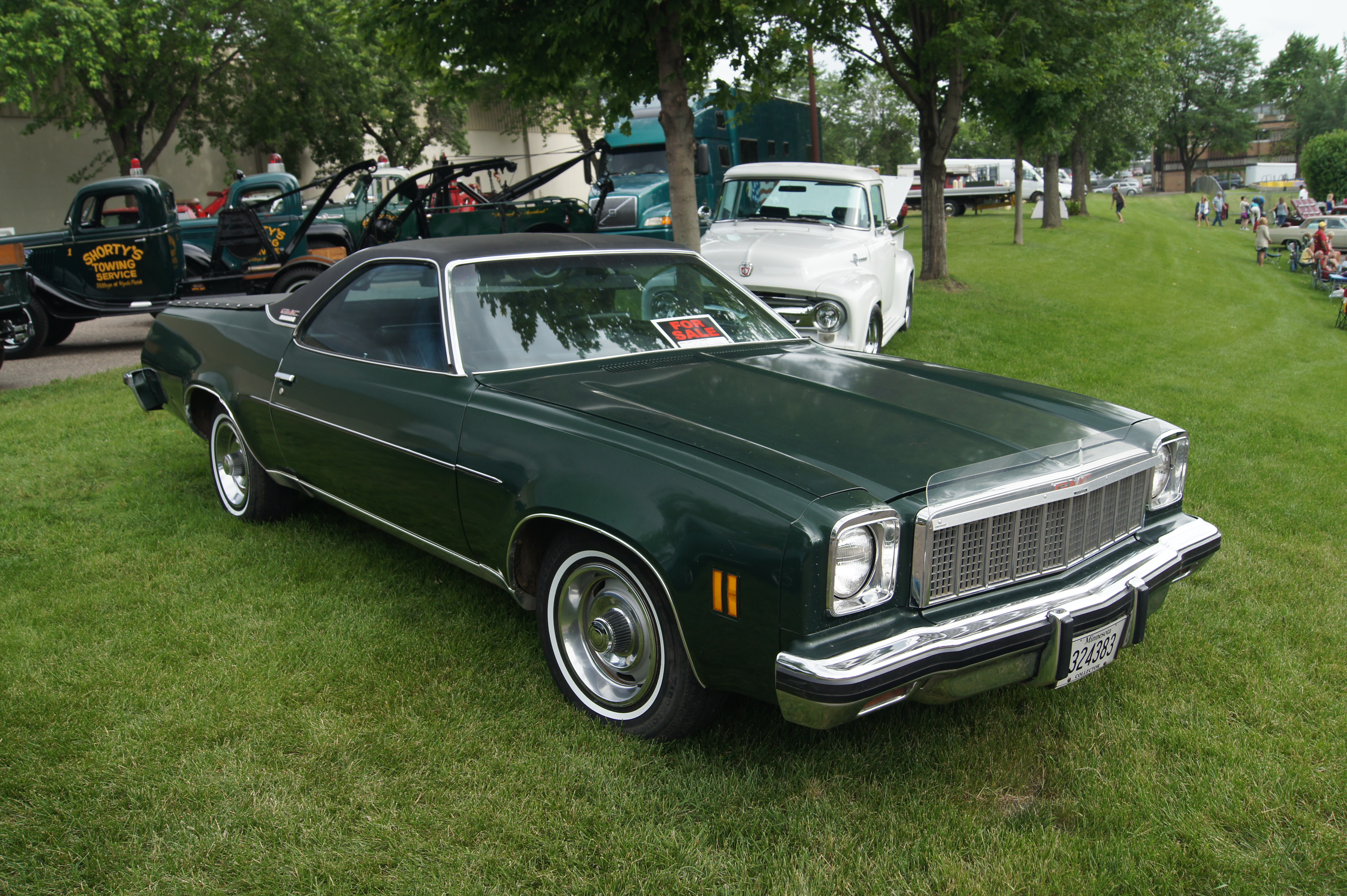
- 1975 GMC Sprint

Overview
- Manufacturer: GMC (automobile)
- Model years: 1971–1977

Body and chassis
- Class: Pickup truck
- Body style: Coupé utility
- Layout: Front-engine, rear-wheel-drive

Chronology
- Successor: GMC Caballero

The GMC Sprint is a coupé utility / pickup truck produced by GMC from 1971 to 1977.

The rear-wheel-drive car-based pickups were sold by GMC Truck dealers primarily in the United States and Canada as the GMC version of the Chevrolet El Camino. Trim designations, emblems, and wheel trim differentiate the GMC from the Chevrolet. The vehicles were built on the General Motors A platform for the duration of the Sprint's production and also for the first few years of the succeeding GMC Caballero. The Sprint was replaced by the more compact Caballero for model year 1978; this remained the sister model to the El Camino.

== First generation (1971–1972) ==
First generation Sprint
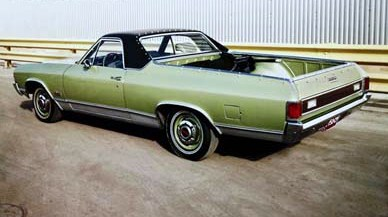
- 1971 GMC Sprint

Overview
- Production: 1970–1972
- Model years: 1971–1972
- Assembly: Baltimore, Maryland, United States, (Baltimore Assembly); Fremont, California, United States, (Fremont Assembly); Leeds, Kansas City, Missouri, United States, (Leeds Assembly); Van Nuys, California, United States, (Van Nuys Assembly)

Body and chassis
- Platform: A-body
- Related: Chevrolet El Camino; Chevrolet Chevelle

Powertrain
- Engine: 250 cu in (4.1 L) Turbo-Thrift I6; 307 cu in (5.0 L) Small-Block V8; 350 cu in (5.7 L) Small-Block V8; 402 cu in (6.6 L) Big-Block V8; 454 cu in (7.4 L) Big-Block V8
- Transmission: 3-speed automatic 3-speed manual 4-speed manual

For the 1971 model year, GMC began producing the Sprint, their version of the Chevrolet El Camino. This light-duty pickup truck was nearly identical to the El Camino except for the emblem and detailing, and the chassis for both cars was based on the Chevrolet Chevelle station wagon/4-door sedan wheelbase. The Sprint's first year was also the first year for mandated lower-octane unleaded fuel which necessitated a reduction in engine compression; GM's A.I.R. system, a "smog pump", was added to control tailpipe emissions. Only 25 GMC Sprint SP Invader 454s were manufactured in 1971.

1972 was the last year for the third generation El Camino, resulting in a two-year generation for Sprint. The only visible difference between 1972 and the previous year's model was the grille. It also had lower power outputs. Engine offerings for 1971–72 included the 250 cubic-inch OHV inline six, small block V8s of 307 and 350 cubic inches; and big block V8s of 402 and 454 cubic-inch displacements. Horsepower ratings of those engines for 1971 ranged from 145 for the six to 365 for the 454 — all in gross figures. For 1972, horsepower measurements were switched to the "net" figures as installed in a vehicle with all accessories and emission controllers hooked up—this change brought the horsepower ratings for 1972 down to a range from 110 hp (82 kW) for the six to 270 for the 454 V8. The Sprint shared exterior and interior trims with the Chevelle Malibu and El Camino including cloth and vinyl or all-vinyl bench seats and deep twist carpeting. All-vinyl Strato bucket seats and center console were optional.

Both the El Camino and Sprint shared the same body styling as the Chevelle from the cowl to the front bumper. The 1971 models featured the Chevelle's twin parking light lenses, dual "high intensity" headlights and horizontally-divided front grille. A large "GMC" badge replaced the Chevy bowtie and for models with optional engines, engine badges (depicting cubic inch size), identical to those of the counterpart Chevrolet, were placed just below the divider bar on the left side of the grille. Both years featured rear end styling taken from the Chevelle station wagon (and were shared with El Camino).

For 1972, the Sprint was given the updated Chevelle front end styling, retaining the "GMC" and optional engine badges in their 1971 locations.

The Sprint has the same design, features, and equipment as the El Camino, with some renamed. It was offered as "Standard" or "Custom". The inline six was only available on the "Standard". Like the Chevelle and El Camino, the GMC Sprint could be ordered with a standard 3-speed Synchro-Mesh manual transmission, an optional four-speed Synchro-Mesh manual, or the Turbo Hydra-Matic three-speed automatic transmission. Luxury options, such as air conditioning, cruise control, power windows, and power locks, were also available at extra cost.

=== Sprint SP ===
The SP package, only offered on the Sprint Custom, was GMC's own equivalent of the Chevrolet SS package. It included the same features as the Chevrolet. The Sprint SP was an option package, RPO YE7, rather than a distinct model. Engines were an L48 350 4 barrel, LS3 400 (402) big block, and the LS5 454 365 hp big block.

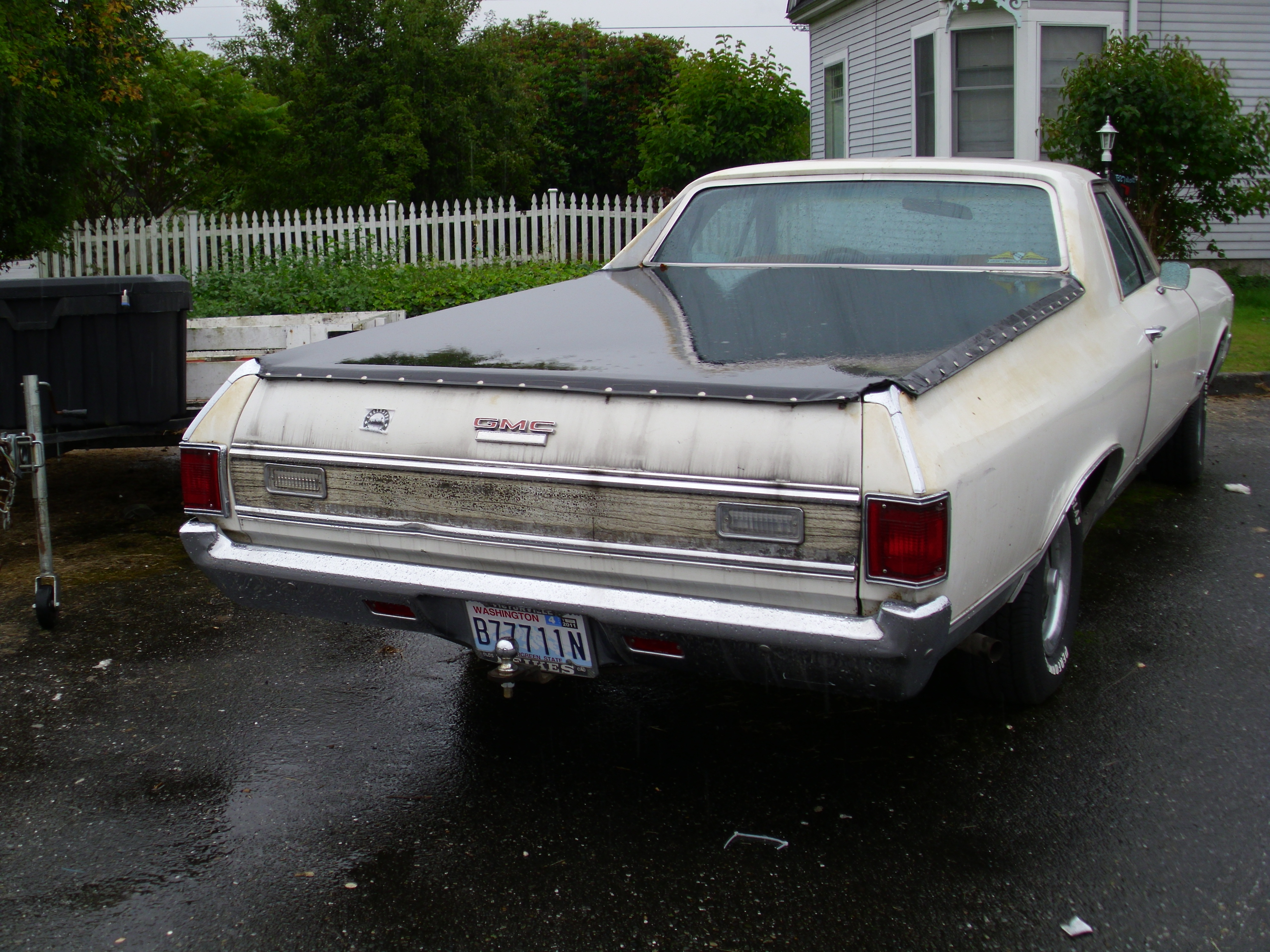
1971-72 GMC Sprint

== Second generation (1973–1977) ==
Second generation Sprint
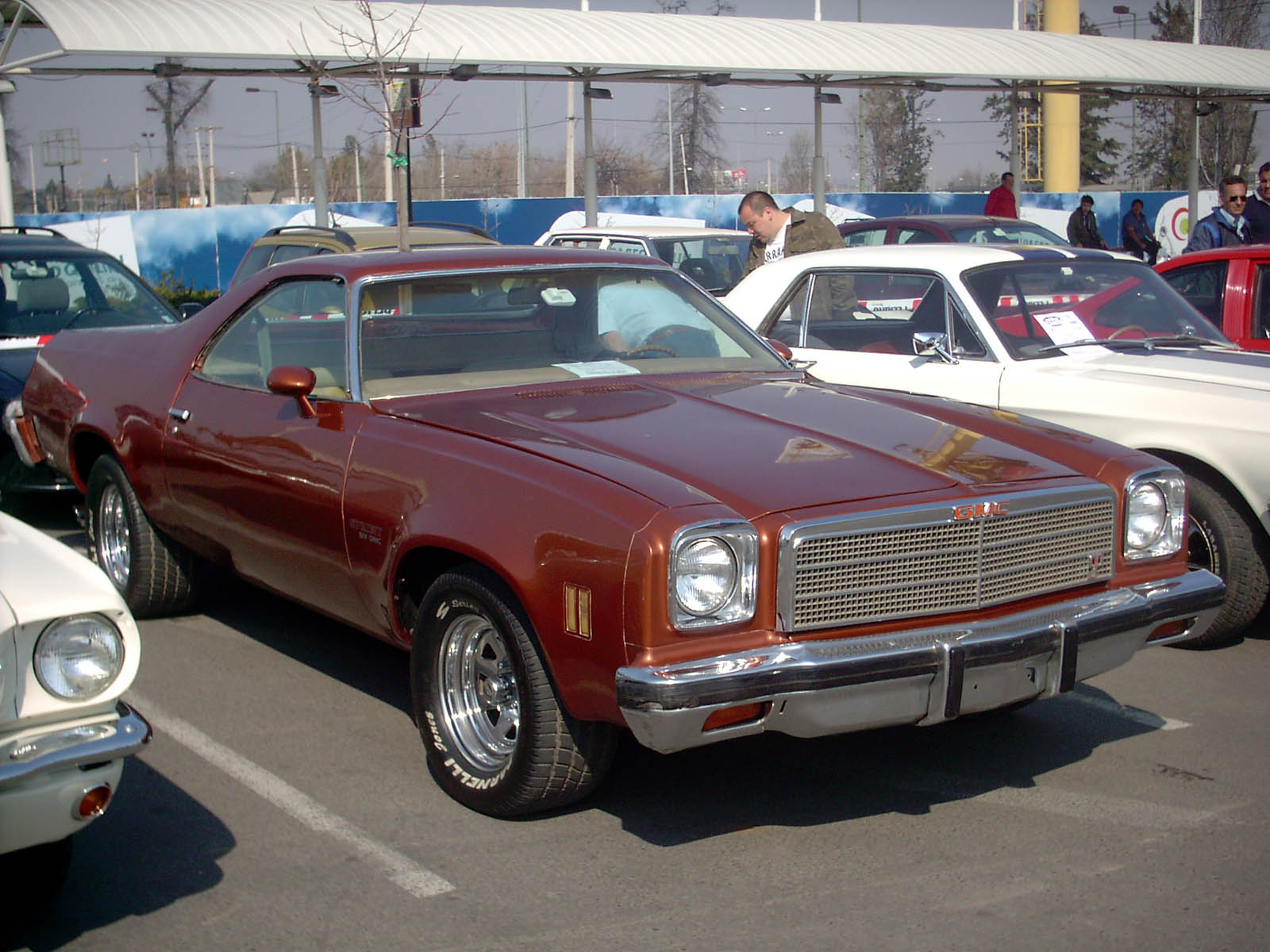
- 1974 GMC Sprint

Overview
- Production: 1972–1977
- Model years: 1973–1977
- Assembly: Arlington, Texas, United States, (Arlington Assembly); Baltimore, Maryland, United States, (Baltimore Assembly); Doraville, Georgia, United States, (Doraville Assembly); Fremont, California, United States, (Fremont Assembly); Leeds, Kansas City, Missouri, United States, (Leeds Assembly)

Body and chassis
- Platform: A-body
- Related: Chevrolet El Camino; Chevrolet Chevelle

Powertrain
- Engine: 4.1 L (250 cu in) Turbo-Thrift I6; 5.0 L (305 cu in) Small-Block V8; 4.1 L (250 cu in) Small-Block V8; 6.6 L (400 cu in) Big-Block V8; 7.4 L (454 cu in) Big-Block V8
- Transmission: 3-speed manual 4-speed manual 3-speed automatic

Dimensions
- Wheelbase: 116 in (2,946 mm)

For 1973, all GM A-body vehicles were redesigned. It was the largest generation of the Sprint, but thanks to lighter construction, it weighed less than the previous generation. Engine offerings during this period included a 250 cubic-inch inline six, as well as a variety of V8s, including the 305, 350 and 400 cubic-inch versions of the Chevy small-block V8, plus the 454 Turbo-Jet big block through 1975. GMC carried over the "Standard" and "Custom" Sprint designations. The inline-six was still only available on the "Standard". Catalytic converters were added to all engines beginning with the 1975 model. Other than annual grille revisions and a switch to quad-stacked, rectangular headlights in 1976, the Sprint remained relatively unchanged through 1977, when the "Sprint" nameplate was replaced with "Caballero" for 1978.

=== Sprint SP ===
The Chevelle SS was dropped after 1973, but the El Camino was one of the few Chevrolet models to retain an SS package. Following suit, GMC continued to offer the Sprint with an SP package, though it was still only available on the Sprint Custom. It no longer included the two fat hood stripes, and the 454 Turbo-Jet big block V8 was discontinued after 1975.

=== Pontiac concept ===
In 1974, GMC's sister division, Pontiac, reportedly took an El Camino body, grafted the urethane-nose front end from its Grand Am series, added the Grand Am's instrument panel, Strato bucket seats with recliners and adjustable lumbar support, along with Pontiac's Rally II wheels as a styling exercise for a possible Pontiac version of the El Camino/Sprint. The concept, however, never reached production. Another show car version was also created in the late 1970s but never left the concept stage.
