= Cardiovascular Cell Therapy Research Network =

Cardiovascular Cell Therapy Research Network (CCTRN) is a network of physicians, scientists, and support staff dedicated to studying stem cell therapy for treating heart disease. The CCTRN is funded by the National Institutes of Health (NIH) and includes expert researchers with experience in cardiovascular care at seven stem cell centers in the United States. The goals of the Network are to complete research studies that will potentially lead to more effective treatments for patients with cardiovascular disease, and to share knowledge quickly with the healthcare community.

== Mission statement ==
The mission of the CCTRN is to achieve public health advances for the treatment of cardiovascular diseases, through the conduct and dissemination of collaborative research leading to evidence-based treatment options and improved outcome for patients with heart disease.

== Components of the Network ==
The sponsor

The National Heart, Lung, and Blood Institute (NHLBI) is one of 27 institutes/centers of the National Institutes of Health (NIH) and supports research related to the causes, prevention, diagnosis, and treatment of heart, blood vessel, lung, and blood diseases; and sleep disorders. The NHLBI plans and directs research in the development and evaluation of interventions and devices related to prevention, treatment, and rehabilitation of patients with such diseases and disorders.

The Coordinating Center for Clinical Trials

Since 1971, the Coordinating Center for Clinical Trials () at The University of Texas School of Public Health has played a leading role in cardiovascular disease and vision research by serving as a coordinating center for 25 nationwide multicenter clinical trials. The CCCT's primary function is to provide and coordinate all operations, procedures, and activities of a large-scale randomized controlled clinical trial. The CCCT serves as the Data Coordinating Center for the CCTRN. The DCC was led by Lemuel Moye (2006-2019) and Barry R. Davis (2019-2021).

The clinical sites

The CCTRN includes seven stem cell centers in the United States with experience and expertise in clinical trials studying treatments for heart disease and peripheral artery disease. These sites include:

- Minneapolis Heart Institute Foundation ()
- Texas Heart Institute Stem Cell Center()
- University of Florida College of Medicine ()
- University of Louisville ()
- Vascular and Cardiac Center for Adult Stem Cell Therapy (VC-CAST)
- University of Miami Miller School of Medicine ()
- Stanford University ()

== Body of work ==
In July 2008, the CCTRN opened enrollment in two studies in patients who had recently had heart attacks: TIME ((NCT00684021)) and LateTIME ((NCT00684060)). The purpose of these studies was to determine if stem cells safely taken from an individual's bone marrow could be transplanted back into the injured heart muscle of the individual and improve the heart's ability to pump following a heart attack, as well as to determine the best time for transplanting the cells following a heart attack. The results of both studies were presented at the American Heart Association (AHA) Scientific meetings in 2011 (LateTIME) and 2012 (TIME), and simultaneously published in JAMA.

In March 2009, the CCTRN opened enrollment in a heart failure study: FOCUS ((NCT00824005)). The purpose of this study was to determine the safety and effectiveness of injecting bone marrow stem cells into heart muscle in an attempt to promote blood vessel growth that could potentially improve the blood supply in hearts that are failing. This study recruited patients who had heart failure, but would no longer benefit from other forms of standard treatment such as surgery or coronary artery repair procedures such as balloon angioplasty or stent placement. The results of this study were presented at the American College of Cardiology (ACC) Annual Meeting in 2012 and simultaneously published in JAMA.

In June 2013, CCTRN opened enrollment in a study in peripheral artery disease: PACE ((NCT01774097)). The purpose of this study was to determine the safety and effectiveness of bone marrow-derived stem cell therapy on improving blood flow and walking ability in patients with peripheral artery disease. The results of this study were published in Circulation in 2017.

In October 2015, CCTRN opened enrollment in a study in heart failure: CONCERT-HF (NCT02501811). The purpose of the study was to determine whether giving autologous Mesenchymal Stem Cells (MSCs) and/or C-kit+ cells to patients with heart muscle damage is safe and to help us learn whether these treatments improve heart function for people who are not ideal candidates for other forms of standard therapy such as surgery. The results of this study were published in the European Journal of Heart Failure in 2021.

In September 2016, CCTRN opened enrollment in a study in anthracycline-induced cardiomyopathy (AIC): SENECA (NCT02509156). The purpose of the study was to determine whether giving allogeneic mesenchymal stem cells (MSCs) to patients with AIC is safe and whether these treatments improve heart function. The results of this study were published in JACC CardioOncology in 2020.
