= Sprinter =

Sprinter can refer to:

== In sport ==
- A participant in sprint (running)
- Sprinter (cycling), a type of racing cyclist
- Sprint train, a group of road bicycle racers who at the end of a race work together to set a high pace to help their sprinter
- A sprint car racing vehicle

== Motor vehicles ==
- Mercedes-Benz Sprinter (or 'Dodge Sprinter', 'Freightliner Sprinter'), a cargo van
- Toyota Sprinter, a compact car

== Trains ==
=== Units ===
- Sprinter (British Rail), a family of diesel multiple units built for British Rail in the 1980s
- NS SGMm (Stadsgewestelijk Materieel), a Dutch electric multiple unit in service since 1975, commonly referred to as "Sprinter old generation"
- NS Sprinter Lighttrain, a Dutch electric multiple unit in service since 2009
- Sprinter New Generation, a Dutch train manufactured by Construcciones y Auxiliar de Ferrocarriles
- V/Line Sprinter, a diesel multiple unit operated by V/Line in Australia

=== Rail services ===
- Sprinter (rail service), a hybrid rail service in San Diego County, California
- Sprinter (Nederlandse Spoorwegen), rail service type in the Netherlands
- ICE Sprinter, a variant of the Intercity Express rail service type operated in Germany

== Other ==
- Sprinter (computer), a Russian microcomputer
- Sprinter (album), by Torres (Mackenzie Scott), 2015
- "Sprinter" (song), a 2023 song by British rappers Dave and Central Cee
- Sprinter (film), a 2018 sports drama directed by Storm Saulter
- Sprinter (manga), written and illustrated by Yū Koyama

== See also ==
- Sprint (disambiguation)
