= Dominique Picard =

French mathematician (born 1952)

Dominique B. Picard
- Born: March 3, 1952 (age 74)
- Education: University of Paris-Sud
- Scientific career
- Fields: Mathematics
- Workplaces: Paris Diderot University
- Doctoral advisor: Didier Dacunha-Castelle

Dominique Brigitte Picard (born March 3, 1952) is a French mathematician who works as a professor in the Laboratoire de Probabilités et Modèles Aléatoires of Paris Diderot University. Her research concerns the statistical applications of wavelets.

== Education ==
Picard's doctoral advisor was Didier Dacunha-Castelle.

== Recognition ==
She was an invited speaker at the International Congress of Mathematicians in 2006, in the section on probability and statistics. At the congress, she spoke on her work with Gérard Kerkyacharian on "Estimation in inverse problems and second-generation wavelets". She was elected to the National Academy of Sciences as an International Member in 2023.

== Selected publications ==
With Valentine Genon-Catalot, Picard is the author of a book on asymptotic theory in statistics, Elements De Statistique Asymptotique (Springer, 1993).

With Wolfgang Härdle, Gerard Kerkyacharian, and Alexander Tsybakov, she is the author of Wavelets, Approximation, and Statistical Applications (Springer, Lecture Notes in Statistics, 1998).

She is also the coauthor of a highly cited paper in the Journal of the Royal Statistical Society (1995) surveying the wavelet-shrinkage method for nonparametric curve estimation.
