= Sprint =

Sprint may refer to:

== Music ==
- Sprints (band), an Irish band formed in 2019
- Sprint (album) a 1982 jazz album by the Red Rodney Ira Sullivan Quintet

== Software and gaming ==
- Sprint (software development), a development phase in software development
  - See also Sprint (scrum) for how sprints are used specifically in the Scrum development methodology
- Sprint (word processor), software published by Borland
- Sprint 2, a series of racing video games from Atari

== Sport ==
=== Athletics ===
- Motorcycle drag racing, a standing-start sprint contest between two participants
- Sprint (track cycling), a track event involving a one-on-one match race between opponents who start next to each other
- Sprint (running), running at top speed over short distance
  - Sprint (TV series), a Netflix original programming series about professional sprinters

=== Horseracing ===
- Sprints, a form of flat racing of horses

=== Motorsports ===
- Sprint (Formula One), racing format at some Formula One races since 2021
- Sprint car racing, auto racing with small, high-powered vehicles
- Sprint Cup Series, the top racing series of NASCAR

=== Watersports ===
- Eastern Sprints, a rowing championship
- Sprint 95, a French sailboat design

== Transport ==
=== Aerospace ===
- Spring WS202 Sprint, a Canadian aircraft design
- Sprint (missile), an anti-ballistic missile

=== Automobiles ===
- Alfa Romeo Sprint, automobile produced by Alfa Romeo between 1976 and 1989
- Chevrolet Sprint, a rebadged version of the Suzuki Swift
- GMC Sprint, the GMC version of the Chevrolet El Camino produced from 1971 through 1977
- Triumph Dolomite Sprint, produced during the 1970s

=== Transit ===
- Sprint (West Midlands), a bus rapid transit scheme in England
- Sprint Expressway, the main expressway network in Klang Valley, Malaysia

== Other uses ==
- Sprint Corporation, a former major telecommunications company in the United States
- Systolic Blood Pressure Intervention Trial (SPRINT), a clinical trial in high blood pressure treatment

== See also ==
- Sprinter (disambiguation)
