= Stuart Geman =

American mathematician

Stuart A. Geman
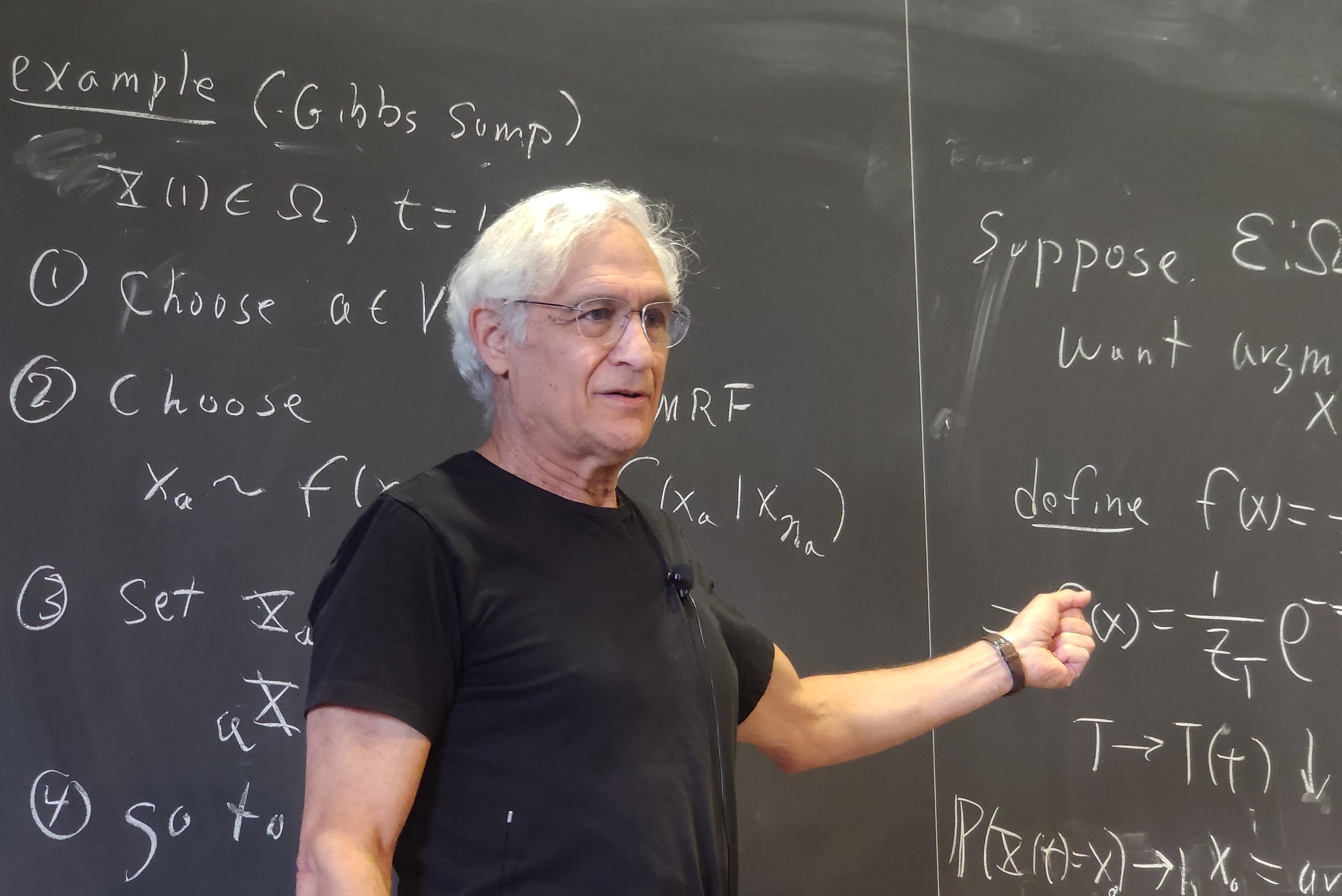
- Geman lecturing on the Gibbs sampler
- Born: March 23, 1949 (age 77); Chicago, Illinois, USA
- Education: University of Michigan B.S. (1971); Dartmouth College M.S. (1973); Massachusetts Institute of Technology Ph.D. (1977)
- Relatives: Donald Geman (brother)
- Scientific career
- Fields: Mathematics
- Workplaces: Brown University
- Thesis: Stochastic Differential Equations with Smooth Mixing Processes (1977)
- Doctoral advisor: Herman Chernoff; Frank Kozin
- Doctoral students: Barry R. Davis
- Website: www.dam.brown.edu/people/geman/

Stuart Alan Geman (born March 23, 1949) is an American mathematician, known for influential contributions to computer vision, statistics, probability theory, machine learning, and the neurosciences. He and his brother, Donald Geman, are well known for proposing the Gibbs sampler, and for the first proof of convergence of the simulated annealing algorithm.

== Biography ==
Geman was born and raised in Chicago. He was educated at the University of Michigan (B.S., Physics, 1971), Dartmouth Medical College (MS, Neurophysiology, 1973), and the Massachusetts Institute of Technology (Ph.D, Applied Mathematics, 1977).

Since 1977, he has been a member of the faculty at Brown University, where he has worked in the Pattern Theory group, and is currently the James Manning Professor of Applied Mathematics. He has received many honors and awards, including selection as a Presidential Young Investigator and as an ISI Highly Cited researcher. He is an elected member of the International Statistical Institute, and a fellow of the Institute of Mathematical Statistics and of the American Mathematical Society. He was elected to the US National Academy of Sciences in 2011. In 2024, he received an Engineering, Science & Technology Emmy Award for his role in the development of the DRS™Nova Film and Video Restoration Software.

== Work ==
Geman's scientific contributions span work in probabilistic and statistical approaches to artificial intelligence, Markov random fields, Markov chain Monte Carlo (MCMC) methods, nonparametric inference, random matrices, random dynamical systems, neural networks, neurophysiology, financial markets, and natural image statistics. Particularly notable works include: the development of the Gibbs sampler, proof of convergence of simulated annealing, foundational contributions to the Markov random field ("graphical model") approach to inference in vision and machine learning, and work on the compositional foundations of vision and cognition.
