= Wolfgang Härdle =

German statistician (born 1953)

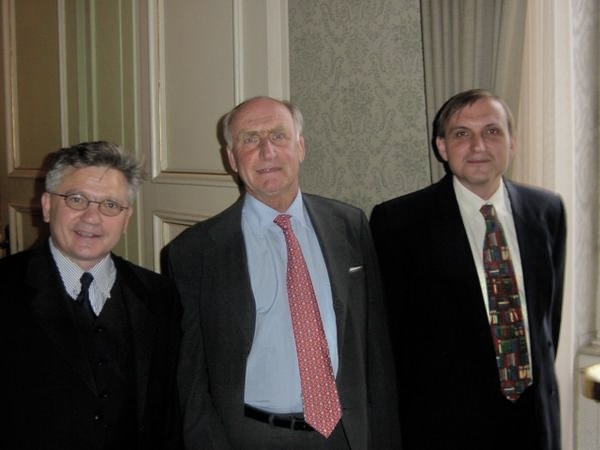
Wolfgang Härdle (left), Werner Hildenbrand (middle) and Alois R. Kneip in Bonn (2002)

Wolfgang Karl Härdle (born 20 October 1953) is a German statistician and University Professor at the Faculty of Economics of the Humboldt University of Berlin.

== Education and career ==
Härdle was born on 20 October 1953, in Darmstadt. He was the son of a master glazier and a post office employee and grew up in Gaggenau, where he graduated from the Goethe Gymnasium in 1972. According to his own academic genealogical research, he is a distant descendant of the mathematician and physicist Carl Friedrich Gauss.

After studying mathematics at the University of Karlsruhe, he has devoted himself to statistical research and teaching since obtaining his mathematics diploma in 1978. He is a specialist in semiparametric and nonparametric estimation methods. In 1982, he received his doctorate in natural sciences from the Heidelberg University under Theodor Gasser. In 1988, he completed his habilitation in statistics and econometrics at the University of Bonn. In 1989, he went to the Université catholique de Louvain as a guest scientist, then as an associate professor. Since 1992, he has been a professor at the Faculty of Economics at the Humboldt University of Berlin. He is the director of the international DFG graduate program IRTG 1792 "High Dimensional Non Stationary Time Series", which has been in existence since 2013.

In addition to his research, Härdle founded the company MD*Tech, which developed and distributed the statistical software XploRe.
