= Fremont Assembly =

Former automobile plant in Fremont, California, U.S.

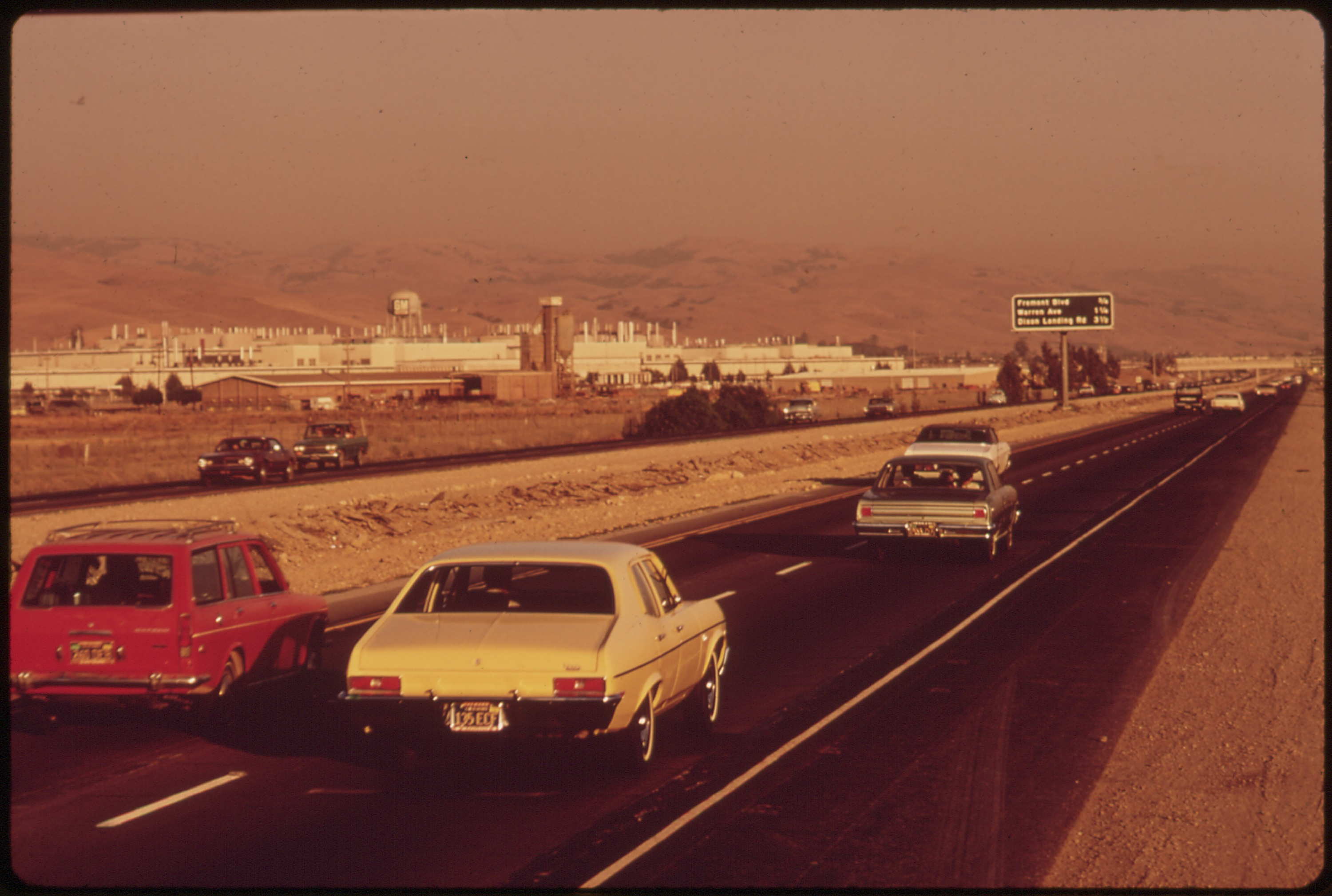
- Fremont Assembly Plant, 1972
- Built: 1963
- Operated: 1963–1982
- Location: Fremont, California, United States
- Coordinates: 37°29′41.12″N 121°56′41.16″W
- Industry: Automotive
- Products: Automobiles
- Employees: 6,800 (1978); 5,700 (1982 closure)
- Volume: 1,072 vehicles daily
- Owner: General Motors

Fremont Assembly was a General Motors automobile factory in Fremont, California, in the San Francisco area, replacing the older Oakland Assembly. Groundbreaking for the plant occurred in September 1961, and the plant produced its first vehicle on May 1, 1963. Production continued through March 1, 1982, when the plant was closed after production problems. After closure, the plant was refurbished and reopened as the more successful NUMMI (New United Motor Manufacturing, Inc.) joint-venture between GM and Toyota between 1984 and 2010, and later became the Tesla Factory in 2010.

== History ==
Chevrolet opened the auto industry's first West Coast assembly plant, Oakland Assembly, in 1916, with production of the Chevrolet Series 490 beginning on September 23 of that year. In the 1940s, Oakland Assembly would contribute to the war effort during World War II building the Chevrolet Fleetline for the military and also producing munitions, aircraft engines, guns and billions of pounds metal forgings and castings. After the war, the plant resumed automobile production. By 1960, General Motors recognized that they needed a facility that was capable of more modern manufacturing methods. Instead of upgrading Oakland Assembly, the company decided to build a new plant, about 17 miles south in Fremont, California. (The Oakland Assembly site was sold to real estate investors in 1964 with the plant demolished and the site redeveloped as Eastmont Mall.)

Groundbreaking for the Fremont Assembly plant occurred in September 1961, based on plans from San Francisco architect John Savage Bolles, the designer of Candlestick Park. The plant produced its first pickup truck on May 1, 1963, pilot production of cars started on July 29, 1963, and regular car production started on September 3, 1963.

The 411-acre (166 ha) plant produced GM A platform vehicles under the Chevrolet, Pontiac, Buick, Oldsmobile, and GMC brands for the Western United States. Once fully running, the plant was able to produce 42 cars and 25 trucks per hour, across two shifts, for a total of 1,072 vehicles per day.

The plant's peak employment came in 1978 with 6,800 full-time workers, but employment had fallen to 5,700 by the time of the 1982 closure.

GM as a company was departmentalized (design, manufacturing), but without the necessary communication and collaboration between the departments. There was an adversarial relationship between workers and plant supervisors, with management not considering the employees' views on production, and quantity was preferred over quality.

Like all American car plants, the production lines at Fremont seldom stopped, and when mistakes were made cars continued down the line with the expectation that they would be fixed later.

By the early 1980s, the adversarial relationship had deteriorated to the point where employees drank alcohol, smoked marijuana, were frequently absent (enough so that the production line couldn't be started), and even committed petty acts of sabotage such as putting "Coke bottles inside the door panels, so they'd rattle and annoy the customer." It was stated at times on Mondays and Fridays there weren't enough workers to start the line, so GM would often go to the bar across the street to hire workers to take their place. Employees at the Fremont plant were "considered the worst workforce in the automobile industry in the United States," according to a later recounting by a leader of the workers' own union, the United Auto Workers (UAW).

Attempts to discipline workers were often met with grievances or even strikes, putting the plant into near-continuous chaos.

By 1982, GM leadership made the decision to close Fremont Assembly and lay off its thousands of workers.

Partially demolished (south end and water tower), the remaining plant was refurbished and was used for the more successful NUMMI (New United Motor Manufacturing, Inc.) joint-venture between GM and Toyota between 1984 and 2010 and later became the Tesla Factory in 2010.

== Models ==
Some of the models produced at the plant included:

- 1963–1981 Chevrolet C/K
- 1963–1981 GMC C/K
- 1964–1977 Chevrolet Chevelle
- 1964–1977 Pontiac LeMans
- 1964–1981 Chevrolet El Camino
- 1964–1973 Pontiac GTO
- 1964–1980 Oldsmobile Cutlass, 442
- 1965–1973 Buick Gran Sport
- 1971–1977 GMC Sprint
- 1973–1977 Buick Century
- 1973–1981 Buick Regal
- 1978–1981 GMC Caballero
- 1982 Chevrolet Celebrity
- 1982 Oldsmobile Cutlass Ciera

== See also ==
- List of GM factories
- San Jose Assembly Plant – Ford Motor Company vehicle assembly plant in nearby San Jose that operated between 1955 and 1983.
