= Leeds, Kansas City =

Neighborhood of Kansas City, Missouri, U.S.

Coordinates: 39.055838°N 94.508565°W

Leeds is a neighborhood of Kansas City, Missouri, United States.

A post office called Leeds was established in 1890, and remained in operation until 1929. The community's name is a transfer from Leeds, England.

Farewell Coffee and Booze and Howdy DIY space, thrift shop and cultural center are located in Leeds.

It used to be the site of a General Motors assembly plant from 1929-1988.
