= Leeds Assembly =

General Motors automobile factory in Leeds, Missouri, US

- Operated: 1929 - April 15, 1988
- Coordinates: 39°3′18.24″N 94°30′16.79″W
- Industry: Automotive
- Products: Automobiles
- Employees: 4,500 (peak)
- Address: 6817 Stadium Drive
- Owner: General Motors

Leeds Assembly was a General Motors automobile factory in Leeds, Missouri. It was closed in 1988. The factory produced the A-bodies and J-bodies.

The Leeds Assembly Plant is located in the Leeds district of Kansas City, Missouri, at 6817 Stadium Drive. The GM operations are closed, and the facility has been sold and is now used as a warehouse and for outdoor storage.

At its peak employment, over 4,500 persons hourly and salary worked at the Leeds plant producing 60 vehicles per hour on two production shifts.

== The early years ==
The Leeds Assembly Plant began operations in 1929 as two separate divisions with GM-controlled Fisher Body and Chevrolet plants under one roof. Each division had its own staff including engineers and administrative positions. The wall down the length of the Leeds facility completely separated operations of Fisher Body and Chevrolet operations, and the car bodies were literally pushed through a hole in the wall from Fisher Body to the Chevrolet side.

== The Leeds sit-down strike ==
The Leeds plant was one of the earliest sit-down strike locations, following the initial sit-down strike at the assembly plant in Atlanta. On December 16, 1936, Fisher Body workers began an eight-day strike that only ended because of the inability to bring food into the plant for workers. The basis for the strike was the firing of an employee the previous day; however Fisher Body employees were said to be paid less than Chevrolet workers and were to have had less job security, and the United Auto Workers (UAW) was pressing for national recognition of the union.

Without car bodies being passed through the hole, the production of Chevrolet vehicles quickly ceased. On February 17, 1937, two months after UAW members at the Leeds plant sat down on their jobs, GM recognized the UAW, altering automobile labor relations.

== General Motors Assembly Division (GMAD) ==
General Motors maintained the two division production at the Leeds Assembly plant for 40 Years

The Fisher/Chevy Wall in the Leeds assembly came down in 1969 when the General Motors Assembly Division (GMAD) was formed. This consolidated all assembly operations under one division. General Motors divisions (Fisher Body, Chevrolet, Pontiac, Buick, Oldsmobile, Cadillac and GMC) were divested of assembly responsibilities. In the 1970s Leeds produced the classic Chevrolet Monte Carlo, the Chevrolet Malibu, and the Chevrolet El Camino.

== BOC and the J-Car ==
Leeds Assembly operated under GMAD until the early 1980s when the GM assembly operations were reconfigured into the Buick-Oldsmobile-Cadillac division (BOC) and the Chevrolet-Pontiac-GM Canada (CPC), with Leeds being placed in the BOC division.

Following a plant retooling, Leeds produced the downsized Monte Carlo and Malibu, but after mediocre sales of the downsized vehicles, Leeds became one of four assembly plants chosen to produce the J-Car; the other plants were in Janesville, Wisconsin, Southgate in California, and Lordstown, Ohio.

Leeds was the primary producer of the Buick Skyhawk and the Oldsmobile Firenza, with subsequent addition of Chevrolet Cavalier production.

== Floods ==
The plant is physically located close to the Blue River. Beginning in the late 1970s the plant was subjected to flooding due to street runoff into storm drains upstream in Missouri and Kansas. In 1977 1 foot (0.30 m) of water flooded the production area throughout the plant; three days later the plant was back in production. The plant flooded one more time while in production, and a third and final time after production had ceased.

== Closing ==
The Leeds Assembly plant officially ceased automobile production on April 15, 1988. The landlocked facility was bordered on the east and west by railroad tracks, on the south by the Blue River, and was not a candidate for expansion.

Attempts to bring the Chevrolet S-10 pickup truck to Leeds were not successful.
