= Chevrolet Turbo-Air 6 engine =

Turbo-Air 6
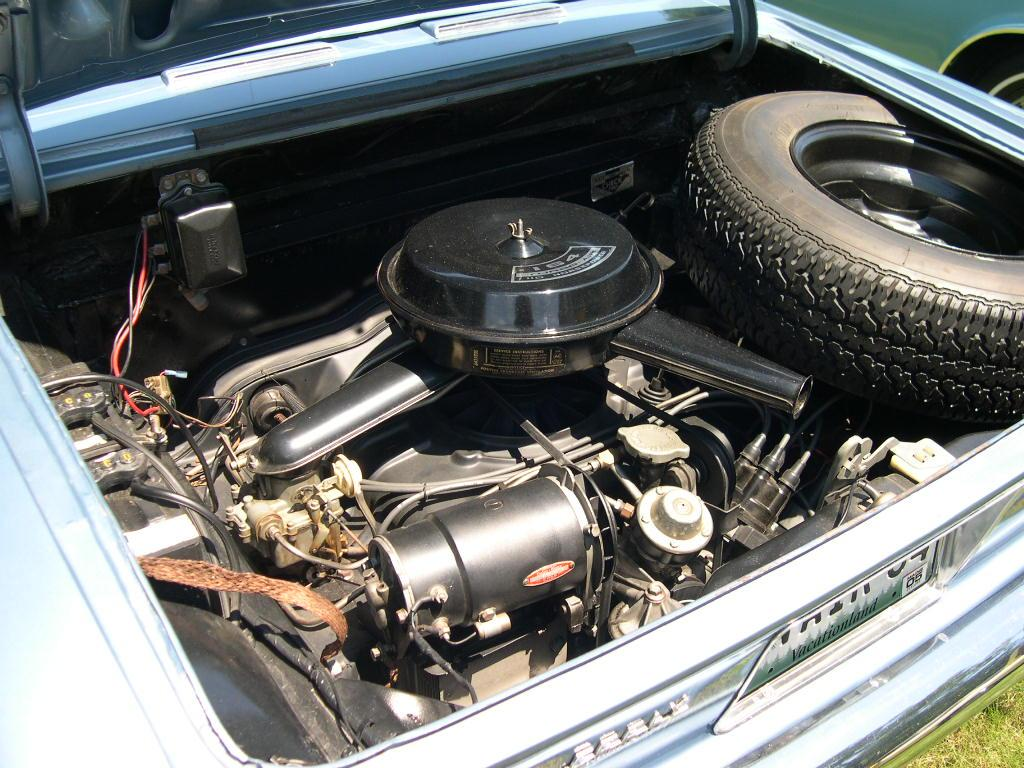

Overview
- Manufacturer: Chevrolet
- Designer: Al Kolbe
- Also called: Corvair engine; Pancake six
- Production: 1960–1969 Tonawanda Engine (engine block and heads); Massena Castings Plant

Layout
- Configuration: Flat-6
- Displacement: 139.6 cu in (2,287 cc) (1960); 144.7 cu in (2,372 cc) (1961–1963); 163.7 cu in (2,683 cc) (1964–1969)
- Cylinder bore: 3.375 in (85.7 mm) (1960); 3.4375 in (87.31 mm) (1961–1969)
- Piston stroke: 2.6 in (66 mm) (1960–1963 NA, 1962–1964 Turbo); 2.94 in (74.7 mm) (1964–1969 NA, 1965–1969 Turbo)
- Cylinder block material: Aluminum (crankcase); Iron (cylinder sleeves)
- Cylinder head material: Aluminum
- Valvetrain: OHV, pushrods, hydraulic tappets
- Compression ratio: 8.0:1, 8.25:1, 9.0:1, 9.25:1, 10.5:1

Combustion
- Turbocharger: Single (some models)
- Fuel system: 2 Rochester H or HV carburetors; 4 Rochester H or HV carburetors; 1 YH Carter Carburetor (Turbo)
- Fuel type: Gasoline
- Oil system: Wet sump
- Cooling system: Air-cooled

Output
- Power output: 80 hp (60 kW); 84 hp (63 kW); 95 hp (71 kW); 98 hp (73 kW); 102 hp (76 kW); 110 hp (82 kW); 140 hp (100 kW); 150 hp (110 kW) (Turbo); 180 hp (130 kW) (Turbo)
- Torque output: 125–232 lb⋅ft (169–315 N⋅m)

Dimensions
- Dry weight: 366 lb (166 kg)

The Chevrolet Turbo-Air 6 is a flat-six air-cooled automobile engine developed by General Motors (GM) in the late 1950s for use in the rear-engined Chevrolet Corvair of the 1960s. It was used in the entire Corvair line, as well as a wide variety of other applications.

The engine's use of air cooling made it appealing to aircraft amateur builders, and small-volume engine builders established a cottage industry modifying Corvair engines for aircraft.

== History ==
Ed Cole, Chief Engineer for Chevrolet from 1952 to 1956 and Chevrolet General Manager from 1956 to 1961, was the person primarily responsible for getting the Corvair and its engine into production. Cole's experience with rear-engined vehicles began during his time as chief design engineer of light tanks and combat vehicles for Cadillac during World War II. He designed powertrains for the M24 Chaffee light tank and M5 Stuart tank, the latter of which used two rear-mounted Cadillac V8 engines driving through Hydramatic transmissions.

After the war, Cole was promoted to Chief Engineer at Cadillac. In 1946, he began experimenting with rear-engined passenger car prototypes, nicknamed "Cadibacks".

In 1950, Cole was asked to oversee production of the M41 Walker Bulldog tank at Cadillac's Cleveland facility. The M41 was powered by a Continental AOS-895-3 engine. This was a six-cylinder, air-cooled, four-stroke supercharged boxer engine that displaced 895 cu in (14.7 L).

Cole also logged over 300 hours piloting a Beechcraft Bonanza powered by a smaller Continental engine with the same basic layout.

After moving to Chevrolet, Cole instructed engineer Maurice Olley to come up with "something different". Olley and his team assessed both front-engine/front-wheel-drive and rear-engine, rear-wheel-drive layouts and determined that the rear/rear layout would need an engine of aluminum, and that air-cooling would be preferred.

Responsibility for development of the engine fell primarily to Senior Project Engineer Robert P. Benzinger and engine designer Adelbert “Al” Kolbe. The first engine was fired up in the Chevrolet Engineering department in December 1957. For the earliest road tests, a prototype was installed in a Porsche 356. Later development mules were either called LaSalle II or badged as Holdens.

A new casting foundry was built in Massena, New York, at Massena Castings Plant. GM convinced Reynolds Aluminum to build an aluminum reduction plant nearby to supply it. Aluminum parts included the block, heads, flywheel housing, crankcase cover, clutch housing and pistons. 92 lb (41.7 kg) of aluminum was used in each engine. New casting and machining techniques had to be developed to produce the light-alloy parts. The aluminum parts were cast with a low-pressure casting technique using machines built and installed by Karl Schmidt GmbH of Neckarsulm, Germany. All of the engines were assembled at GM's Tonawanda Engine plant.

The car and engine were officially introduced on 29 September 1959 and debuted in showrooms on 2 October. Advertising prepared by the Campbell-Ewald agency highlighted the fact that the air-cooled engine did not require anti-freeze, and that much of the engine was made of "aircraft-type" aluminum. The same ad agency gave the engine its official name, the "Turbo-Air 6".

The Turbo-Air 6 engine was used in all Corvair car models in all trim levels, including the 500, 700, 900 Monza, Corsa, and Spyder coupes sedans and convertibles, as well as the Corvair and Lakewood station-wagons. It also powered the Forward-Control 95 series vans, including the Corvan and the Chevrolet Greenbrier van, and both the Loadside and Rampside pickup trucks.

Tuned versions of the engine appeared in some modified Corvairs sold under the customizer's name, such as the Fitch Sprint, the Yenko Stinger, and the Solar Cavalier. Don Yenko claimed as much as 240–250 hp (179.0–186.4 kW) from his Stage IV and racing Stingers.

Manufacturing of the Turbo-Air 6 ended with the cessation of Corvair production after 1969.

== Technical features ==
The Turbo-Air 6 is a flat-six engine that is primarily air-cooled. The engine's major components include an aluminum crankcase, two three-cylinder aluminum cylinder heads with integral intake manifolds, and six individual iron cylinder barrels. The #1 cylinder is at the right rear with cylinders 1, 3, and 5 on the right, while #2 is the left rear with cylinders 2, 4, and 6 on the left. The firing order is: 1-4-5-2-3-6.

The crankcase is cast as two box-section halves. The assembled crankcase provides for four main bearings. There are four cylinder head studs per cylinder, for a total of twelve on each side. The crankshaft, the earliest versions of which were forged alloy steel, had six throws but no counterweights, permitting a weight-saving of 25 lb (11.3 kg).

Each cylinder head has two overhead valves per cylinder activated through stamped-steel rocker arms and hydraulic tappets by pushrods that run through tubes below each cylinder barrel. The engine developed a reputation for leaking oil past the seals of the pushrod tubes. New seals of Viton solved the problem.

Viewed from the rear, the Corvair engine's crankshaft rotates counter-clockwise; opposite that of most other engines. This allows it to use regular transmission and pinion-gear arrangements when mounted in a rear-engine configuration.

Primary cooling is done by a shrouded cooling fan mounted horizontally on top of the engine. The fans were revised throughout the production run, with early fans made of steel and later ones of magnesium to reduce inertia. The fan is driven by a long V-belt from the back of the engine with an adjustable idler pulley. The belt makes two 90° turns to reach the fan resulting in four 90° twists. An early problem with the fan drive-belt jumping off the pulleys was solved by making the groove in the idler pulley deeper and adding belt guides. A metal bellows thermostat modulated either a ring valve on early engines or a set of damper doors on later ones to regulate the flow of cooling air.

Engine oil is also used as a coolant. To remove heat from the oil the engine used a variety of types and sizes of oil coolers throughout its production run.

Most Turbo-Air 6 engines use two one-barrel Rochester H carburetors; one per cylinder head. A later high-performance engine uses four carburetors; one Rochester HV primary and one Rochester H secondary per head. The secondary carb had no choke plate, idle circuit, accelerator pump, power circuit, or vapor vent.

The arrangement of intake and exhaust valves in the Turbo-Air 6 is considered noteworthy, with the valves arranged as intake/exhaust, intake/exhaust, intake/exhaust down both sides. The use of separate exhaust ports rather than twinned or siamesed ports helps avoid problems with distortion caused by a concentration of heat at these locations.

There is a single cast-iron camshaft located in the crankcase. The shaft has only nine cam lobes on it — the symmetrical arrangement of valves allows three double-width cam lobes to operate all six exhaust valves.

=== Turbocharging ===
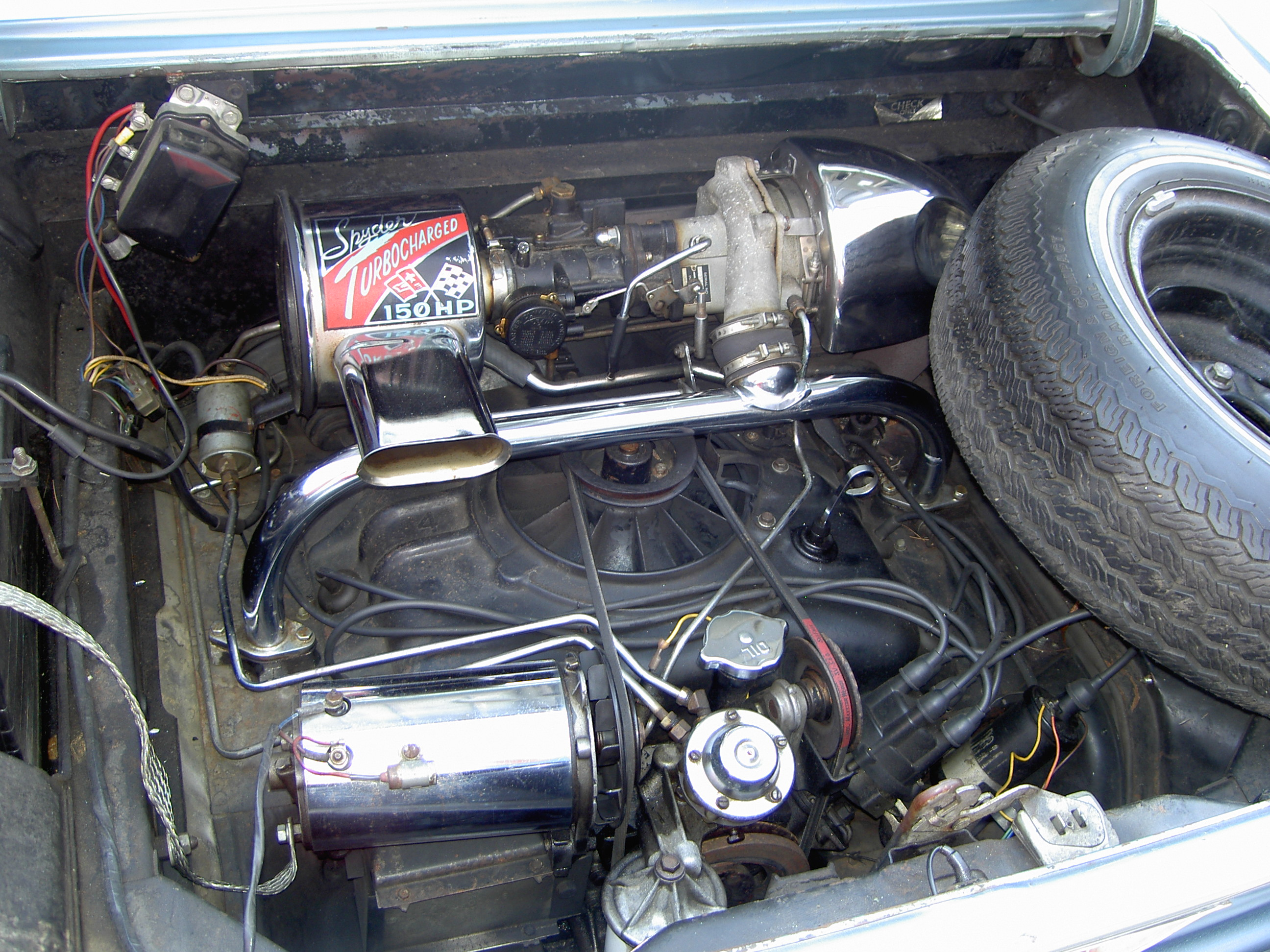
Turbocharged Corvair engine

Chevrolet introduced a turbocharged version of the engine for the 1962 model year. Development of this version was done by engineers James Brafford and Robert Thoreson, under the oversight of Bob Benzinger, who had become chief engine designer for the Corvair in 1959. The turbocharged Corvair was released one month after the turbocharged Turbo-Rocket engine in the Oldsmobile F-85 Jetfire, making it just the second turbocharged car in volume production. This engine was not marketed under the Turbo-Air name, being listed initially as the Super Charged Spyder engine.

Many of the internal components were strengthened or otherwise revised to deal with the stresses of forced induction. The engine received heavy-duty rod and main bearings, chromed upper piston rings, and nickel/chromium alloy exhaust valves. The crankshaft in the turbocharged engine was made of forged 5140 chrome-steel. The compression ratio was reduced to the 8.0:1 of the original 1960 naturally aspirated engine. The multiple-carburetor intake system was replaced with a single side-draft Carter YH carburetor.

The turbocharger was made by the Thompson Valve Division of Thompson-Ramo-Wooldridge Inc., which became TRW in 1965. The model selected weighed 13.5 lb (6.1 kg). It had a 3 in (76 mm) diameter impeller and was capable of spinning at up to 70,000 rpm.

The turbocharged Corvair engine did not use a wastegate to limit boost pressure. Instead, boost was controlled by an exhaust system designed to create back-pressure sufficient to limit the maximum boost. To prevent the engine from running too lean a metering rod and jet were selected that supplied an over-rich mixture when at full throttle. Static timing advance was set to 24° BTDC, with an additional 12° of centrifugal advance coming in above 4000 rpm. To prevent pre-ignition, a diaphragm on the distributor provided a pressure retard function rather than a vacuum advance, and could retard timing by up to 9° at manifold pressures above 0.14 bar (2.0 psi).

With maximum boost pressure limited to 10 psi (0.69 bar), power output from this engine in 1962 was 150 hp (111.9 kW), a 47% increase over the 102 hp (76.1 kW) output of the naturally aspirated engine. Torque was also increased by 58% to 210 lb⋅ft (285 N⋅m).

== Production run changes ==
=== 1960 ===
- Engine debuts. Bore and stroke are 3.375 in × 2.6 in (85.7 mm × 66.0 mm), for a total displacement of 140 cu in (2.3 L). The compression ratio is 8.0:1, and power and torque outputs are 80 hp (59.7 kW) at 4400 rpm and 125 lb⋅ft (169 N⋅m) at 2400 rpm.
- The 1960 engine has two carburetors, but a common air intake and filter with a single integrated automatic choke. Air is fed to the carburetors through two large rubber hoses.
- The cooling fan is 11 in (280 mm) in diameter with 24 blades, and is made of steel.
- Cooling airflow is controlled by a large-diameter bellows thermostat that drives a ring-shaped air valve in the eye of the blower.
- The oil is cooled by a folded-fin cooler.
- The engine does not have a harmonic balancer.
- A high-output version of the engine called the "Special Camshaft package" is offered this year. This engine uses a different Rochester carburetor, a different camshaft profile with revised timing, and stiffer valve springs as well as a larger diameter exhaust system and a Delco-Remy ignition. Power output is up to 95 hp (70.8 kW).

=== 1961 ===
- Bore diameter in increased to 3.4375 in (87.31 mm), raising engine displacement to 144.7 cu in (2,372 cc).
- A high performance Super Turbo-Air version is released. This engine includes a revised cylinder head and camshaft, with a compression ratio raised to 9.0:1. Power is up to 98 hp (73.1 kW) at 4600 rpm and torque is up to 132 lb⋅ft (179 N⋅m) at 2800 rpm. Development was reportedly done by Zora Arkus-Duntov.
- Engine cooling fan diameter is reduced to 10.7 in (270 mm) with 16 vanes that extend right to the centre of the fan wheel.
- The common intake with integrated choke is replaced by a shared air intake and manual chokes at each carburetor controlled by a pull-knob on the dashboard.
- Cooling is now controlled by a new set of damper doors at the lower part of each shroud actuated by small-diameter bellows thermostats.

=== 1962 ===
- Naturally aspirated versions this year include a standard engine with an 8.0:1 compression ratio producing 80 hp (59.7 kW) at 4400 rpm and 128 lb⋅ft (174 N⋅m), another version with a compression ratio of 9.0:1 for Monzas with Powerglide transmissions that produces 84 hp (62.6 kW) and 130 lb⋅ft (176 N⋅m) at 2300 rpm, and the Super Turbo-Air engine that now makes 102 hp (76.1 kW) at 4400 rpm and 134 lb⋅ft (182 N⋅m) at 2800 to 2000 rpm.
- The carburetors now have automatic chokes.
- A turbocharged version of the engine is announced on 27 March 1962. Displacement is 144.7 cu in (2,372 cc), and output is 150 hp (111.9 kW) at 4400 rpm and 210 lb⋅ft (285 N⋅m) at 3200 to 3400 rpm.

=== 1963 ===
- Crankcase ventilation becomes standard.
- The folded-fin oil cooler is replaced with a 3-plate design on most cars and an 8-plate design on Spyders and cars equipped with air-conditioning.
- Minor changes are made to the voltage regulator, distributor, cam profiles, and valves.

=== 1964 ===
- Displacement of naturally aspirated and turbocharged engines grows to 163.7 cu in (2,683 cc) by increasing the stroke to 2.94 in (75 mm).
- Compression ratios are raised to 8.25:1 for the base and turbocharged engines, and to 9.25:1 for the high-performance engines.
- Power and torque outputs rise to 95 hp (70.8 kW) at 3600 rpm and 154 lb⋅ft (209 N⋅m) at 2400 rpm for the base engine, 110 hp (82.0 kW) at 4400 rpm and 160 lb⋅ft (217 N⋅m) at 2800 rpm for the Super Turbo-Air engine. Peak power from the turbocharged engine is unchanged due to the carryover of the same turbocharger from 1962 and 1963, but arrives at 4000 rpm, and torque is 232 lb⋅ft (315 N⋅m) at 3200 rpm.
- The engine cooling fan is changed to a unit with 11 vanes and a diameter of 11.2 in (280 mm) that is made of magnesium.
- Air-conditioned cars and higher performance models receive a 12-plate oil cooler.
- A harmonic balancer is added to the engine on all models except the base 95 hp engine.

=== 1965 ===
- The 95 and 110 hp (70.8 and 82.0 kW) engines are carried over essentially unchanged, with the exception of having an alternator instead of a generator.
- A new naturally-aspirated version of the engine appears that produces 140 hp (104.4 kW) at 5200 rpm and 160 lb⋅ft (217 N⋅m) at 3600 rpm. This engine has revised cylinder heads with larger valves, larger intake manifolds and exhaust port tubes, and a dual exhaust system. The 140 hp (104.4 kW) engine also has four carburetors; two Rochester HV primaries and two Rochester H secondaries controlled by a progressive throttle linkage. The 140 hp (104.4 kW) engine also comes with the 12-plate oil cooler used on air-conditioned and turbocharged cars, and has the same forged chromium-steel crankshaft used in the turbocharged engine.
- The turbocharged engine is fitted with a redesigned turbocharger with increased impeller dimensions, which increases maximum boost capacity to a level commensurate with the increased engine displacement that was introduced in 1964. Power is up to 180 hp (134.2 kW) at 4,000 rpm and 232 lb⋅ft (315 N⋅m) of torque at 3,200 rpm.

=== 1966 ===
- The 140 hp (104.4 kW) engine receives a revised secondary linkage and cross-shaft for its four-carb setup.
- All engines in cars sold in California, with the exception of turbocharged or air-conditioned versions, come equipped with Air Injection Reactors (AIR). The system includes an air-injection pump and tubes, two mixture control valves, two check valves, and the requisite hoses. The distributor and carburetors are also specific to AIR-equipped engines.

=== 1967 ===
- All models sold in California come equipped with the AIR system. The package is available as an option in other regions.
- The 140 hp (104.4 kW) engine is dropped in early 1967, but reinstated later that year.
- The 180 hp (134.2 kW) turbocharged engine is dropped from the lineup.

=== 1968 ===
- All US cars come equipped with the AIR system. Cylinder heads, exhaust manifolds, the distributor, and carburetors are all slightly changed to adapt to the AIR system.
- 140 hp (104.4 kW) engine reinstated as a regular production option.
- The fuel system receives a vapor return line previously exclusive to the turbocharged engine.

=== 1969 ===
- No significant changes to the engine.

== Experimental versions ==
=== Modular construction ===
In January 1960 Frank Winchell, who had a hand in adapting the Powerglide transmission to the Corvair, was made head of Chevrolet Engineering's Research and Development group. In summer 1961 this group was working on two projects: the development of a counterpart to Ford's proposed Cardinal small car design and development of a second generation engine to succeed the Turbo-Air 6. Among the goals for the new engine were increased horsepower, and elimination of some of the problems encountered with the original design, such as head-gasket failures and oil leaks.

Winchell first built an engine with displacement increased to 176 cu in (2.9 L), but this only made the existing head-gasket problems worse. Winchell then proposed casting individual cylinder barrels and cylinder heads as a single piece, eliminating the head-gasket completely. A team was assembled that was led by Al Kolbe, who was responsible for the design of the original Turbo-Air 6. Heading up design for the new engine was Joe Bertsch, who was joined by engineers Len Kutkus and Jerry Mrlik. The engine they designed and developed kept the Turbo-Air 6 engine's boxer configuration and use of air cooling, and became known as the modular engine.

As with Winchell's earlier engine, bore and stroke were increased to 3.56 in (90.4 mm) and 2.94 in (74.7 mm) respectively. The combined barrel-head was to be die-cast in aluminum with cast-iron cylinder liners. Each of these castings also included a channel for the pushrod path, doing away with the previous design's pushrod tubes. Valve covers were held in place by quick-release clips. Rather than use four long bolts per cylinder, the bottom of each cylinder barrel had a heavy flange which was bolted to the crankcase. The single horizontal cooling fan was replaced by three vertical fans on a common shaft.

Problems with heat-distortion of the early alloy cylinder barrel/head units led to a subsequent redesign that included cooling fins angled at 45° to eliminate cutouts needed for access to the bolts holding the barrels to the crankcase, and the reintroduction of push-rod tubes.

The engine was "modular" in that the individual cylinder/head units allowed Chevrolet to design engines with 2, 4, 6, 8, 10, and 12 cylinders, of which versions with 2, 4, 6 and 10 cylinders were built. The 6 cylinder version produced about 120 hp (89.5 kW) and was tested in a Corvair, while 2 and 4 cylinder engines were installed in a Renault Caravelle and two Alfa Romeo Giuliettas. The 10 cylinder version was called P-10 and was installed in a 1962 Chevrolet Impala converted to front-wheel drive. This engine produced 200 hp (149.1 kW). Design project XP-790 was originally meant to be the basis for a front-wheel drive replacement for GM's E-body cars, and incorporate flat-10 engines based on the P-10. Project XP-787 was split off from XP-790 to allow further development, while XP-790 was returned to the Research Studio, where it became the basis for the Firebird IV concept car. Project XP-787 was cancelled. Engines with 8 and 12 cylinders were designed but not built.

A private Corvair owner bought a collection of engines and parts and installed a running modular engine in his personal car.

=== Overhead camshafts ===
Chevrolet developed a prototype of the Turbo-Air 6 with a single overhead camshaft (SOHC) in each cylinder head. This was during the time from 1964 to 1966, with the SOHC project lagging the modular engine by approximately a year.

The camshafts were driven off the crankshaft by a timing belt. The valves were operated through rocker arms. The engine used three cooling fans, each directing air to one pair of opposed cylinders. The air/fuel intake used one Chevrolet-designed three-barrel carburetor per side. The original 2.94 in (74.7 mm) stroke was retained while the bore was increased to 3.56 in (90.4 mm), giving a total displacement of 175 cu in (2.9 L). The pistons were a pent-roof type, and the combustion chamber shape approximated a hemisphere. The compression ratio was 10.5:1. While claimed output was as high as 240 hp (179.0 kW) at 7200 rpm, none of the three prototype engines developed more than 190 hp (141.7 kW) at 5700 rpm and 170 lb⋅ft (230 N⋅m) at 5200 rpm.

In the Chevrolet Final Report on the engine written 22 February 1966, the need for improvements in cooling was highlighted. Power losses to the cooling fan was reported to be 26 hp (19.4 kW) at 6000 rpm and was expected to nearly double at the engine's redline, bringing useful power down to the vicinity of the naturally aspirated 140 hp (104.4 kW) engine.

One of the SOHC engines was displayed alongside the Astro I concept car, although it is reported that it was never installed in the car. All three prototype engines are believed to have been destroyed.

=== Fuel injection ===
General Motors began investigating the use of fuel injection on the Turbo-Air engine on 11 August 1962. A mechanical injection system made by the Marvel Schebler division of BorgWarner was installed on a pre-production 164 cu in (2.7 L) engine. The engine received Bill Thomas 4X1 cylinder heads with larger valves; 1.7 in (43 mm) intake and 1.38 in (35 mm) exhaust. A camshaft from Iskendarian provided high-lift and longer duration. After the initial feasibility study serious development started on 12 February 1963.

Extensive testing of intake systems was done. Eventually the team settled on 1 3/4 in (44 mm) diameter ram tubes each 25 in (640 mm) long and a central plenum. This configuration was tested against both a 1963 and 1964 turbo engine as well as engines with six individual carburetors and two three-barrel Webers. The injected engine's output of 133 hp (99.2 kW) was higher than both turbos but lower than either carbureted engine. Road testing of the injected engine began on 19 April 1963.

In May 1963 a new injection system designed by Rochester was installed that produced nearly the same output as the Marvel-Schebler system. Performance of the most recent development engine was compared with a 4X1 140 hp (104.4 kW) engine on 5 November 1963; the injected engine produced approximately 14 hp (10.4 kW) more. Another extensive road-test evaluation began on 15 November 1963. During October and November 1964 four more injected engines were built, one of which underwent road testing. By 2 February 1965 the injected engine was producing 180 hp (134.2 kW) gross and 147 hp (109.6 kW) net. On 24 February 1965 a final lab comparison was run, that concluded the 30-month development program. The extra cost of fuel injection could not be justified based on the power gains achieved.

Some versions of the Yenko Stinger were available with fuel injection. This system was based on GM's work.

=== Water-cooling ===
While not a Chevrolet project, at least one water-cooled Turbo-Air 6 was built by independent engine designer Lloyd Taylor.

== Other applications ==
Apart from the production Corvair models, the Turbo-Air 6 engine was used in a variety of other applications.

=== Prototypes and styling exercises ===
Both General Motors and some major carrozzeria have used the engine in several Corvair-based concept and show cars.

- Corvair Monza — The first Corvair Monza was a Show car that pre-dated the production Monza. This two-door coupe was first seen at the Chicago Auto Show.
- Corvair Super Monza — Mechanically unmodified, the Super Monza was an exercise ordered by Bill Mitchell that saw a 900 coupe fitted with a luxurious interior and special exterior paint and trim, including a sunroof and wire wheels. It debuted at the 1960 New York Auto Show.
- XP-709 "Pinky" — The first Corvair convertible, this car was eventually given to Harley J. Earl's wife Sue.
- Pontiac Polaris — This version of the Corvair carried a Pontiac badge and modified bodywork. It reached prototype stage before being cancelled.
- Sebring Spyder Coupe — This concept was powered by a 145-horsepower engine with four carburetors.
- XP-737 Sebring Spyder roadster. The original engine in this short-wheelbase concept had a Paxton supercharger. It was later converted to a turbocharged engine.
- XP-785 Corvair Super Spyder — Another short-wheelbase special, this car also had revised front bodywork, and a turbocharged engine.
- XP-777 Chevrolet Corvair Monza GT — This project mounted the engine amidships. Over time it received a variety of engines, including a 3 L (183 cu in) version and one with twin-turbochargers.
- XP-797 Chevrolet Corvair Monza SS — The SS kept the engine behind the rear wheels, and added six Dell'Orto carburetors.
- XP-842 Chevrolet Astro I — An extremely low show car designed by Larry Shinoda under the direction of Bill Mitchell, the Astro I was built to use a rear-mounted engine and was displayed alongside the SOHC prototype engine.
- XP-849 Corvair II — This GM styling exercise first appeared in May 1965. XP-849 was turned over to the Research Studio at the end of 1965. A revised car appeared in June 1966, but the project was cancelled by June 1967. No engine was specified but some body features suggested that a rear-engined configuration was still being considered.
- Chevrolet Corvair Speciale by Pininfarina — Pininfarina first showed a Corvair-based coupe in 1960, and a 2+2 version later.
- Chevrolet Testudo — Built by Bertone. The Testudo was designed by Giorgetto Giugiaro, and used the factory power-train in a shortened chassis.

=== Specialist Corvairs ===
Some companies modified stock Corvairs to create vehicles that offered improved performance or individualized appearance that were sold under the customizers' or parts suppliers' names.

- Yenko Stinger — Don Yenko built 100 modified Corvairs with the rear seats removed to qualify it as a sports car for SCCA racing in 1966. The SCCA put the car in Class D. Stingers were available in several stages of tune, including Stage I (160 hp (119.3 kW)), Stage II (190 hp (141.7 kW)), Stage III (220 hp (164.1 kW)), and Stage IV (240 hp (179.0 kW)). Production ran from 1966 through 1969.
- Fitch Sprint — A Fitch Sprint could be bought directly from John Fitch's works in Connecticut, or the parts to complete one ordered as a dealer-installed option. Engines in early cars received a Fitch-developed four-carburetor intake, while later cars used the factory four-carb setup but with other modifications. Power was raised to a peak of 155 hp (115.6 kW).
- Solar Sprint and Solar Cavalier — Built by Solar Automotive. In the 1970s John Fitch sold his remaining Fitch Sprint parts inventory and that part of his business to Art Hershberger of Princeton, Wisconsin. Herschberger resumed production of the Sprint and launched the Cavalier model. Solar models continued to use Fitch's carburetor modifications as well as offering a Weber conversion.
- IECO Corvair — IECO was a major aftermarket parts supplier. Among other items, IECO offered a four-barrel "Ram induction" carburetor conversion intake manifold for the Corvair engine.
- EMPI Corvair- EMPI was a major aftermarket parts supplier that offered a camber-compensator for the Corvair, as well as performance equipment including intake and exhaust systems.
- Eshelman Golden Eagle — Built by Cheston Lee Eshelman's company, this car was a standard Corvair with some superficial cosmetic customization. The engine was unmodified.
- Lost Cause — Commissioned by Charles Peaslee Farnsley, with bodywork and trim by the Derham Body Company, the Lost Cause was a Corvair converted into a luxurious personal limousine. It debuted at the 1963 New York Auto Show. The engine was reported to have received a Fitch four-carb conversion.

=== Hot rods and custom cars ===
Private hot rodders and a few small companies built one-off cars, some intended for series production that never materialized, that used the Turbo-Air 6 engine.

- Can Am 1 — Produced by the Bolide Motor Company, this Corvair-powered prototype is believed to be a development of the AMT Piranha. A project of Jack Griffith and Borg-Warner, the car was shown at the 1969 New York Auto Show. A later version was to have been powered by a Ford V8. The car did not go into production.
- Claymobile — A custom-bodied Corvair that was reported to have been either a tribute to or commission from boxer Muhammud Ali. Its name referred to Ali's birth name of Cassius Clay.
- Corphibian — GM engineers Richard E. Hulten and Roger D. Holm developed an amphibious Forward Control truck. They formed Hulten-Holm and Company, and tried to get GM to put it into production. A fiberglass undertray was fitted to seal the undercarriage of the one prototype built, and the rear of the truck was extended by 2 feet (0.61 m) to make room for the hydraulic reservoir and motors needed to drive the propellers, powered by a hydraulic pump driven off the Turbo-Air 6 engine. The Corphibian did not go into production.
- Corsetta — A BMW Isetta microcar powered by a Corvair Turbo-Air 6 engine.
- Corvair Futura — This custom forward-control station wagon with center-steering was built by Henry Larson of New Brighton, Minnesota. It was inspired by a sketch of a car called the Waimea done by Rhys Miller, which was one of several designs Miller did for the Kaiser Aluminum company to promote the use of aluminum in automobiles. While the Waimea was intended to be front-wheel drive, the Futura retains the rear-engine, rear-wheel drive location of the Turbo-Air 6 engine from the Corvair Greenbriar van that it was based on. The car was purchased by Wayne Carini.
- Devin GT — Developed by Devin Enterprises, the company founded by Bill Devin, this Corvair-powered coupe was meant to go into production after the Devin C, but only appeared in prototype form.
- Fitch Phoenix — Built by John Fitch. This custom-bodied car was built on a Corvair chassis whose wheelbase had been shortened to 95 in (2,413.0 mm). Weight was reduced to 2,200 lb (997.9 kg). The car started out as a 1965 Monza coupe. The engine code listed for the car when at auction in 2014 indicates that the unit installed was a 164 cu in (2.7 L) engine originally making 140 hp (104.4 kW). Power was boosted to 170 hp (126.8 kW). The bodywork was done in steel by Intermeccanica.
- Forcasta — A bubble-car built by Darryl Starbird in 1961, this car was based on a 1960 Corvair and engine with a heavily customized steel body. The engine was stock, but steel parts were chrome-plated and alloy parts were polished.
- Forton Track T — A mid-engined, Turbo-Air 6 powered track-style T roadster built by Bill Forton.

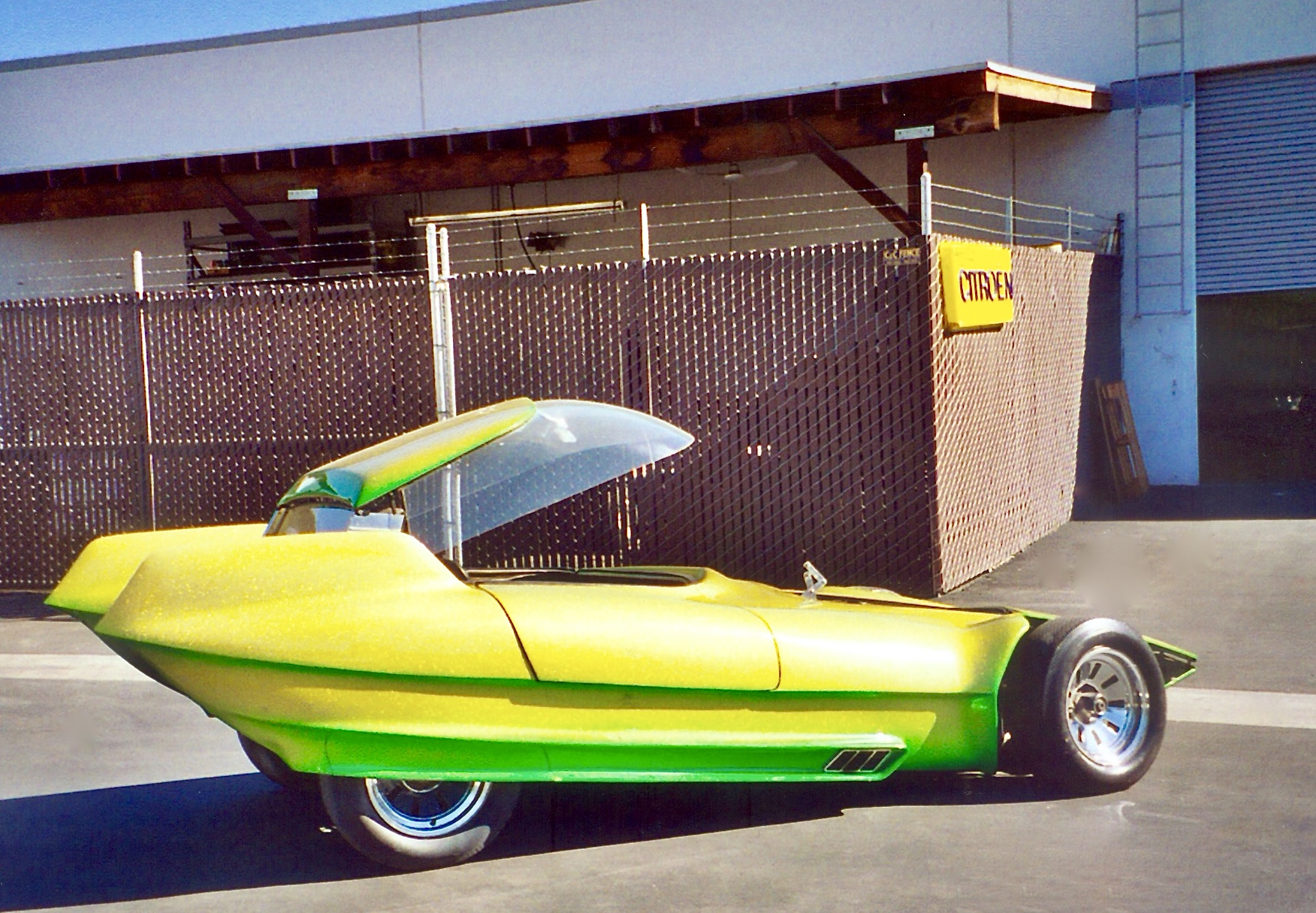
Reactor by Gene Winfield

- Hannibal Twin-8 — Five copies were built for the movie The Great Race. Two were driveable, and of these one was powered by a Corvair flat-six engine. All four rear wheels are driven via chain drive.
- Molzon Concept Corsa GT 38 — Designed and built by GM designer Bill Molzon, this car had a four-carb Turbo-Air 6 engine mounted amidships driving through a Porsche transaxle. The car weighed just 1,220 lb (553.4 kg). It was sold at auction on 18 January 2018.
- Reactor — Built by Gene Winfield. Winfield partnered with Ben Delphia on the design. Bodywork was done in aluminum. The car used a turbocharged Corvair engine mounted in the front and driving the front wheels, using a modified Citroën DS chassis, including the Hydropneumatic suspension. This car appeared on the television programs Bewitched, Star Trek: The Original Series, and Batman (TV series).
- Road Agent — A mid-engined bubble-car built by Ed "Big Daddy" Roth. Roth installed the Turbo-Air 6 engine ahead of the rear wheels in a custom chassis of 4130 tubing with the 2-speed automatic transaxle mounted upside-down to provide the proper rotation.
- Silhouette II Space Coupe — A Corvair-powered bubble-car built by Bill Cushenbery. An early Corvair engine was installed in a custom chassis with an aluminum superleggera body. The original engine was later replaced by a 1965 140 hp (104.4 kW) model.
- Stiletto — A Corvair-powered bubble-car commissioned by Bob Larivee, designed by Gene Baker, and built by Ron Gerstner. Stiletto debuted at the 1966 Detroit Autorama show and was featured in the July 1966 issue of Car Craft magazine.
- T-bucket — A front-engined Corvair-powered hot rod built by Don Kendall. This car was featured on the cover of Rod Action magazine in November 1973. It also won "Best Engineered Rod" at the 1973 NSRA NATS in Tulsa, Oklahoma.

=== Limited-production automobiles ===
Some smaller manufacturers used the engine in limited-production cars, some with heavily modified Corvair chassis and some with fully custom frames.

- AMT Piranha & Centaur Engineering CRV-II through CRV-V sports racer — Initially commissioned by Marbon Chemicals and designed by Dann Deaver of Centaur Engineering as the CRV. These cars were meant to showcase ABS plastic-bodied cars. With the exception of the first CRV prototype and the Piranha dragster, all were powered by the Chevrolet flat-six engine, Aluminum Model Toys, commonly abbreviated as AMT, re-engineered the CRV, called it the Piranha, fitted it to a modified Corvair chassis, and offered it for sale as a kit. The work was done at AMT's Speed and Custom Division headed by Gene Winfield. AMT offered the car with the option of either a 140 or 180 hp (104.4 or 134.2 kW) engine. In 1967, the AMT Piranha appeared on the Man from U.N.C.L.E. television series.
- Cord 8/10 Sportsman — Built by the Cord Automobile Company, established by Glen Pray. A 4/5 scale replica of a Cord 810 powered by either a 140 or 180 hp (104.4 or 134.2 kW) Corvair engine in a front-wheel-drive layout. 6 prototypes and 91 production cars were built until the company was shuttered. Production was restarted by SAMCO, who built an additional 14 cars, 12 of which continued with Corvair power.
- Devin C — Built by Devin Enterprises. The car was based on the earlier, VW or Porsche-powered Devin D.
- Fiberfab Azteca — A further development of Fiberfab's earlier Aztec model, the 1965–66 Azteca included a custom chassis that allowed it to install the Corvair pancake engine ahead of the rear wheels. Three are reported to have been built. A restored, customized Azteca appeared at the 2013 SEMA show with a supercharged Corvair engine said to develop in the range of 275–350 hp (205–261 kW).
- Fiberfab Avenger GT-15 — A kit-car with a GT40-influenced body built specifically to use the Corvair drive-train including its rear-mounted Turbo-Air 6 engine.

=== On-road race cars ===
The Turbo-Air 6 powered several cars of different types that were purpose-built to be raced on pavement.

- Bobsey SR-3 — Chassis SR3-004, originally built by Gerald Mong for driver Chuck Dietrich, was fitted with a Corvair engine in a special wide chassis.
- Huffaker Genie MkV — Chassis H-005 was built to accept a Corvair engine.
- LaBoa — A custom-built car commissioned by attorney Herbert W. Cox. Construction was done by Fitzgerald Machine Shop in Greenville, Ohio. The Corvair-powered car was raced throughout the 1960s before being garaged in 1967. The LaBoa was eventually sold and restored.
- Levair Velociraptor — Built by Warren LeVeque, owner of LeVair Performance Products. The car was built from parts from a Formula Saab. The engine was enlarged to 180 cu in (2.9 L), and developed 225 hp (167.8 kW). LeVeque sold the car and bought it back at a later date. Several members of the LeVeque family have raced the Velociraptor.
- Lola T320 — Built by Seth Emerson, the car started as pre-1976 Formula Vee chassis #19 and was lengthened by 2.5 in (64 mm) to make room for the longer Corvair engine. A Crown Manufacturing adapter plate mated the engine to the Lola's Hewland transaxle. The engine was turbocharged.
- E-Econo class dragster — The owner and engine builder was Ray Clayton. The chassis was built by Kenny Bowers at Advanced Chassis.
- Silver Fox — An autocross car that was originally built by Brian Harding, the car was first sold to Gary Bailey and eventually to Dan Cole. As part of restoring the car Cole had the engine bored and rebuilt by Bill Bamford.

=== Motorcycles ===
Several Corvair-powered motorcycles have been built by individual fabricators and bike shops. Some of the most well-known are listed below.

- Corvair Trike — Built by Tom McMullen of AEE Choppers.
- Grasshopper — Built by "Wild" Bill Gelbke.
- Six-Pack — Built by Norm Grabowski.

=== Off-road vehicles ===
- Manx-Vair and the Queen Manx — Actor Steve McQueen contracted off-road expert Pete Condos and his company Con-Ferr engineering to build a special car for the 1968 "The Thomas Crown Affair" movie. Starting with a standard Meyers Manx, Condos and his staff modified the body and installed a 140-horsepower four-carburetor Corvair engine in the car to create the "Queen Manx". Con-Ferr and Meyers went on to build over 50 copies, called the "Manx-Vair". The car was later revived as the Hunter Buggy by Universal Fiberglass.
- Deserter GS — Sold by Dearborn Automobile Company Inc., much of the engineering was done by a company called Autodynamics, which shared shop space with Dearborn Automobile. Autodynamics background building successful Formula Vee cars (based on the 1963 Volkswagen Beetle) was reflected in the custom tubular chassis and VW-based suspension of the car. The Deserter GS was a mid-engined car, with a long-wheelbase that allowed the Turbo-Air 6 engine to be mounted ahead of the rear wheels.
- Bugetta — A rear-engined Buggy built by veteran Indianapolis and Group 7 car builder Jerry Eisert and his company, Eisert Racing Enterprises. The Corvair engine was mounted in a unique monocoque chassis.
- Trail Blazer — A four-wheel drive car designed by Vic Hickey of the Hickey Manufacturing Company, it is powered by a Corvair engine. The engine is mounted behind the front wheels in a front-mid-engine arrangement. Engine power goes back through a Borg-Warner three-speed transmission to a transfer case that corrects for engine rotation and sends power to the front and rear differentials. General Motors bought the rights to the car, and hired Hickey. The Trail Blazer is considered by some to be the forerunner to the Chevrolet Blazer.

=== Volkswagen conversions ===
Several options existed for adapting the Turbo-Air 6 engine to the transaxle in Volkswagen-based cars, or to fit a complete Corvair power-train into a modified VW chassis.

- Crown Manufacturing — Sold adapters that allowed the Corvair engine to bolt directly up to a Volkswagen transaxle. This conversion required either flipping the pinion over to the other side of the transaxle case (on swing-axle VWs) or installing a Crown-supplied reverse-rotation camshaft (for IRS VWs) to compensate for the rotation of the Corvair engine.
- Hadley Engineering — Developed a kit sold under the name "Trans-Vair". This product included a full sub-frame that allowed a complete Corvair powertrain to be installed in a modified Volkswagen chassis.
- Lukes and Shorman — One of the first companies to offer a kit to adapt the Turbo-Air 6 to a Volkswagen transaxle. Lukes and Shorman produced an adapter plate of cast aluminum to mate the engine to the transaxle. The need to machine the flywheel end of the crankshaft was avoided by the use of a Porsche flywheel with a steel plate drilled to the Corvair bolt pattern welded into its centre. The clutch used was a VW commercial disc mated to the diaphragm pressure plate from a Porsche Carrera. Engine rotation was compensated for by flipping the ring gear to the other side of the transaxle. A revised starter was needed, and the early engines were converted to 6 volt operation to make them compatible with the electrical systems on early Volkswagens.

=== Motorhomes ===
- Travalon and UltraVan — Aircraft designer David Peterson created this monocoque-framed motorhome, built using aircraft methods. The early Travalon models built by the Prescolite Corporation were used as mobile showrooms. The UltraVan models were built by Ultra Inc. The vehicles were powered by either the 110 hp (82.0 kW) or, later, an optional 140 hp (104.4 kW) version of the Corvair flat-six engine. Weighing about 3,500 lb (1,587.6 kg), the Ultravan could cruise at 60 mph (97 km/h) and return fuel economy in the range of 15–20 mpg_{‑US} (16–12 L/100 km; 18–24 mpg_{‑imp}).

=== Military ===
- Canadair CL-91 / DynaTrac XM-571 — A two-body amphibious track vehicle, the CL-91/XM-571 was powered by an industrial version of the Turbo-Air 6.
- AGL-4 — The Articulated General Purpose Logistical Truck was a prototype vehicle produced by GM Defense Research Laboratories. Powered by a Corvair flat-six engine, the AGL-4 had an articulated joint between the cab and bed that allowed the two to rotate with respect to each other. It did not reach production.
- Gama Goat XM561 — Designed by Roger Gamaunt and built by the Chance-Vought Aircraft company, the Gama Goat was a six-wheel drive military vehicle with four-wheel steering and an articulated body. A Turbo-Air 6 engine powered two of the earliest prototypes, but was replaced by a Detroit Diesel 53 engine in the production version, which had the designation M561.
- XM-808 Twister — Built by Lockheed Ground Vehicles, the first prototype of this eight-wheeled dual-body military off-roader used two 163.7 cu in (2,683 cc) Corvair engines — one in front and one in back — to propel the vehicle.

=== Marine ===
- Wayne 100 inboard marine engine — This was a version of the Corvair pancake six engine adapted to marine use by Wayne F. Horning and his company, Inboard Marine. The engine was installed vertically, flywheel end up, and drove a lower unit that went through the bottom of the hull. The engines were first put in 16 foot Glasspar Avalons, and later in Tahiti hulls.

=== Scientific prototypes ===
- MGL/MOLAB — The Mobile Geological Laboratory was a test platform for lunar exploration powered by a modified Corvair engine. The vehicle was designed and built by Vic Hickey while at General Motors.

=== Aircraft ===
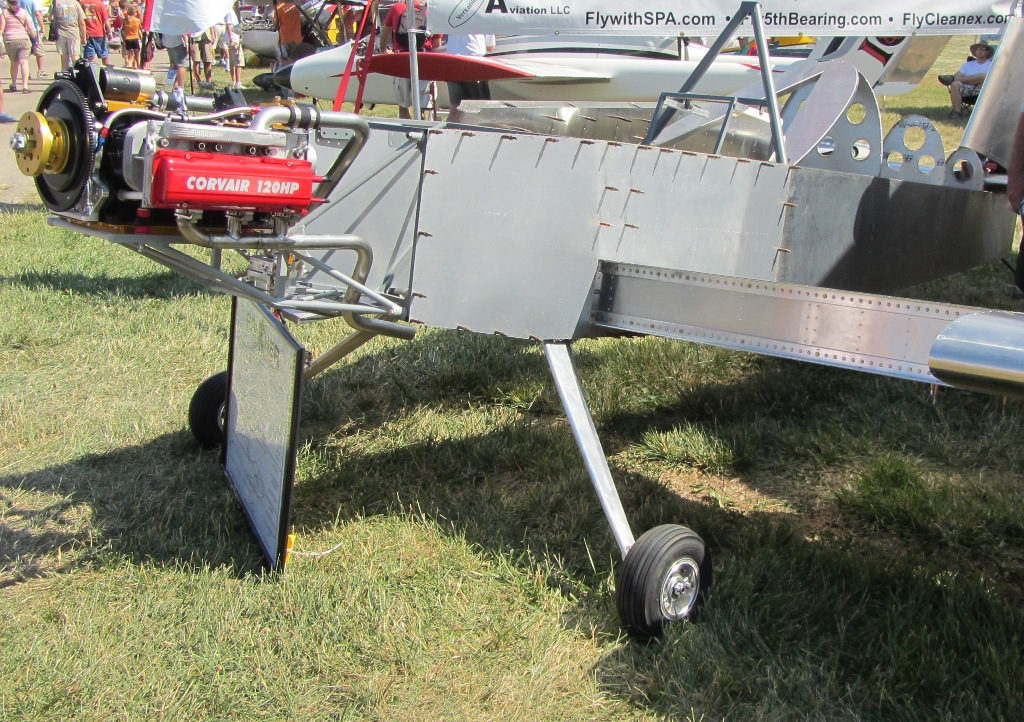
A Sport Performance Aviation Panther airframe under construction, fitted with a Corvair engine

The air-cooled Corvair engine has been widely used in homebuilt aircraft. Some aircraft, such as the Pro-Composites Personal Cruiser have been specifically designed for them. The defunct American company Hegy Propellers, which was based in Marfa, Texas, produced propellers specifically for Corvair engines.

A variation on the six-cylinder engine is an opposed-twin version based on the Corvair pancake six. Some individuals have also experimented with inline-triple configurations based on half of a Turbo-Air six.

==== Aircraft applications ====
- Ace Baby Ace
- AMD Zodiac
- Azalea Saberwing
- Bowers Fly Baby
- Custom Flight Lite Star
- Pietenpol Air Camper
- Pro-Composites Personal Cruiser
- Sport Performance Aviation Panther
- Zenith Zodiac CH 601
- Zenith STOL CH 701

== Engine Serial Number Codes ==
The following codes (last two characters of engine serial number) identify the year, size, power, and transmission of the engine

- YC 6 cyl with M/T, 1962-64
- YH 6 cyl with M/T, 1962
- YL 6 cyl with M/T A/C, 1962-64
- YM 6 cyl with A/C HPE, 1962-63
- YM 6 cyl with T/C 4 sp Tr, 1964
- YN 6 cyl with M/T HPE, 1962-64
- YR 6 cyl with T/C 4 sp fr, 1962
- Z 6 cyl with A/T, 1960-64
- ZB 6 cyl with A/T, 1962
- ZD 6 cyl with A/T A/C, 1962-64
- ZF 6 cyl with A/T HPE, 1962-64
- ZG 6 cyl with A/T, A/C, HPE, 1962-64
- ZH 6 cyl with A/T, 1962-64
- ZJ 6 cyl with A/T, A/C, 1962
- Y 6 cyl with M/T HPE, 1962-63
- RL 6-164 with T/C, 1966
- RM 6-164 with M/T, SHPE, 1965-67
- RN 6-164 with SHPE, P/G, 1965-67
- RQ 6-164 with SHPE, AIR, 1966-67
- RR 6-164 with A/C, 1966
- RS 6-164 with M/T, AIR, 1965-68
- RS 6-164 with AIR, 1966
- RU 6-164 with M/T, HPE, AIR, 1965-68
- RV 6-164 with P/G, AIR, 1965-68
- RW 6-164 with HPE, AIR, P/G, 1966-68
- RX 6-164 with P/G, HPE, AIR, 1965-67
- RY 6-164 with A/C, SHPE, 1966-67
- RZ 6-164 with SHPE, A/C, 1966-67
- RA 6-164 with M/T and A/T, 1965-67
- RB 6-164, 1965-66
- RD 6-164 with HPE, 1965-67
- RE 6-164 with A/C, 1965-68
- RF 6-164 with HPE, A/C, 1965-68
- RG 6-164 with P/G, 1965-67
- RH 6-164 with P/G, HPE, 1965-67
- RJ 6-164 with P/G, A/C, 1965-68
- RK 6-164 with P/G, HPE, A/C, 1965-68
- QO 6-164 with P/G, AIR, A/C, 1967
- QP 6-164 with HPE, P/G, AIR, A/C, 1967
- QQ 6-164 with SHPE, AIR, A/C, 1967
- QR 6-164 with SHPE, AIR, A/C, P/G, 1967
- QS 6-164 with HPE, AIR, A/C, 1967

Terms

- A/C — Air Conditioning
- AIR — Air Injection Reactor
- A/T — Automatic Transmission
- HPE — High Performance Engine
- P/G: Power-Glide automatic transmission.
- SHPE — Special High Performance Engine
- T/C — Turbo-Charged

Engine & Options	Model Series	1960	1961	1962	1963	1964	1965	1966^{(9)}	1967^{(9)}	1968^{(10)}	1969^{(10)}
80 hp, 3-speed	500/700/900	Y	-	-	-	-	-	-	-	-	-
80 hp, MT 3 or 4-spd	500/700/900 except SW	-	Y^{(1)}, YC^{(2)}	YC	YC	-	-	-	-	-	-
80 hp, AT	500/700 except SW	Z	Z	Z	Z	-	-	-	-	-	-
80 hp, MT, AC	500/700/900 except SW	-	YL^{(4)}	YL	YL	-	-	-	-	-	-
80 hp, AT, AC	500/700 except SW	-	ZD^{(4)}	ZD	ZD	-	-	-	-	-	-
80 hp, MT 3 or 4-spd., SW	535/735	-	YF^{(1)},YH^{(2)}	YH	YH	-	-	-	-	-	-
80 hp, AT, SW	535/735	-	ZB	ZB	-	-	-	-	-	-	-
80 hp, MT, FC	FC	-	V	V	V	-	-	-	-	-	-
80 hp, AT, FC	FC	-	W	W	W	-	-	-	-	-	-
80 hp, MT, FC, Export version	FC	-	-	VA	VA	-	-	-	-	-	-
80 hp, AT, FC, Export version	FC	-	-	WA	WA	-	-	-	-	-	-
80 hp, AT, Monza only	900 except SW	Z	Z^{(1)}ZH^{(7)}	-	-	-	-	-	-	-	-
84 hp, AT, Monza only	900 except SW	-	-	ZH	ZH	-	-	-	-	-	-
80 hp, AT, AC, Monza only	900 except SW	-	ZJ^{(4)(7)}	-	-	-	-	-	-	-	-
84 hp, AT, AC, Monza only	900 except SW	-	-	ZJ	ZJ	-	-	-	-	-	-
84 hp, AT, SW, Monza only	935	-	-	ZL	-	-	-	-	-	-	-
95 hp, 140 CID, 3-spd	500/700/900	YA^{(1)}YB^{(2)}	-	-	-	-	-	-	-	-	-
95 hp, 140 CID, 4-spd	500/700/900	YD	-	-	-	-	-	-	-	-	-
95 hp, 164 CID, MT	500/700/900	-	-	-	-	YC	-	-	-	-	-
95 hp, 164 CID, AT	500/700/900	-	-	-	-	Z	-	-	-	-	-
95 hp, 164 CID, MT, AC	500/700/900	-	-	-	-	YL	-	-	-	-	-
95 hp, 164 CID, AT, AC	500/700/900	-	-	-	-	ZD	-	-	-	-	-
95 hp, 164 CID, MT, FC	FC	-	-	-	-	V	-	-	-	-	-
95 hp, 164 CID, AT, FC	FC	-	-	-	-	W	-	-	-	-	-
95 hp, 164 CID, MT, FC, Export version	FC	-	-	-	-	VA	-	-	-	-	-
95 hp, 164 CID, AT, FC, Export version	FC	-	-	-	-	WA	-	-	-	-	-
98 hp, MT, 8.0:1 CR	500/700/900 except SW	-	YD^{(5)}	-	-	-	-	-	-	-	-
98 hp, MT, 9.0:1 CR	500/700/900 except SW	-	YN^{(5)}	-	-	-	-	-	-	-	-
98 hp, AT, 8.0:1 CR	500/700/900 except SW	-	ZD^{(3)(8)}	-	-	-	-	-	-	-	-
98 hp, AT, 9.0:1 CR	500/700/900 except SW	-	ZF^{(3)}	-	-	-	-	-	-	-	-
98 hp, MT, 8.0:1 CR, SW	535/735	-	YJ^{(5)}	-	-	-	-	-	-	-	-
98 hp, MT, 9.0:1 CR, SW	535/735	-	YQ^{(5)}	-	-	-	-	-	-	-	-
98 hp, AT, 8.0:1 CR, SW	535/735	-	ZE^{(3)}	-	-	-	-	-	-	-	-
98 hp, 9.0:1 CR, SW	535/735	-	ZK^{(3)}	-	-	-	-	-	-	-	-
98 hp, MT, 9.0:1 CR, AC	500/700/900 except SW	-	YM^{(4)}	-	-	-	-	-	-	-	-
98 hp, AT, 9.0:1 CR, AC	500/700/900 except SW	-	ZG^{(4)}	-	-	-	-	-	-	-	-
102 hp, MT	500/700/900 except SW	-	-	YN	YN	-	-	-	-	-	-
102 hp, AT	500/700/900 except SW	-	-	ZF	ZF	-	-	-	-	-	-
102 hp, MT, AC	500/700/900 except SW	-	-	YM	YM	-	-	-	-	-	-
102 hp, AT, AC	500/700/900 except SW	-	-	ZG	ZG	-	-	-	-	-	-
102 hp, MT, SW	535/735	-	-	YQ	-	-	-	-	-	-	-
102 hp, AT, SW	535/735	-	-	ZK	-	-	-	-	-	-	-
110 hp, MT	500/700/900	-	-	-	-	YN	-	-	-	-	-
110 hp, AT	500/700/900	-	-	-	-	ZF	-	-	-	-	-
110 hp, MT, AC	500/700/900	-	-	-	-	YM	-	-	-	-	-
110 hp, AT, AC	500/700/900	-	-	-	-	ZG	-	-	-	-	-
110 hp, MT, FC	FC	-	-	-	-	VB	-	-	-	-	-
110 hp, AT, FC	FC	-	-	-	-	WB	-	-	-	-	-
150 hp, MT, TC, Spyder	927-967	-	-	YR	YR	-	-	-	-	-	-
150 hp, MT, TC, Spyder	627-667	-	-	-	-	YR	-	-	-	-	-
95 hp, MT	-	-	-	-	-	-	RA	RA	RA	-	-
95 hp, AT	-	-	-	-	-	-	RG	RG	RG	-	-
95 hp, MT, AC	-	-	-	-	-	-	RE	RE	RE	-	-
95 hp, AT, AC	-	-	-	-	-	-	RJ	RJ	RJ	-	-
95 hp, MT, AIR	-	-	-	-	-	-	-	RS	RS	RS	AC
95 hp, AT, AIR	-	-	-	-	-	-	-	RV	RV	RV	AE
95 hp, MT, AIR, AC	-	-	-	-	-	-	-	-	QM	-	-
95 hp, AT, AIR, AC	-	-	-	-	-	-	-	-	QO	-	-
95 hp, MT, RC	-	-	-	-	-	-	RS	-	-	-	-
95 hp, AT, FC	-	-	-	-	-	-	RV	-	-	-	-
110 hp, MT	-	-	-	-	-	-	RD	RD	RD	-	-
110 hp, AT	-	-	-	-	-	-	RH	RH	RH	-	-
110 hp, MT, AC	-	-	-	-	-	-	RF	RF	RF	-	-
110 hp, AT, AC	-	-	-	-	-	-	RK	RK	RK	-	-
110 hp, MT, AIR	-	-	-	-	-	-	-	RU	RU	RU	AD
110 hp, AT, AIR	-	-	-	-	-	-	-	RW	RW	RW	AF
110 hp, MT, AIR, AC	-	-	-	-	-	-	-	-	QS	-	-
110 hp, AT, AIR, AC	-	-	-	-	-	-	-	-	QP	-	-
110 hp, MT, FC	-	-	-	-	-	-	RU	-	-	-	-
110 hp, AT, FC	-	-	-	-	-	-	RX	-	-	-	-
140 hp, MT, except Corsa	-	-	-	-	-	-	RM	RM	^{(6)}	-	-
140 hp, AT, except Corsa	-	-	-	-	-	-	RN	RN	^{(6)}	-	-
140 hp, MT, AC, except Corsa	-	-	-	-	-	-	-	RZ	-	-	-
140 hp, AT, AC, except Corsa	-	-	-	-	-	-	-	RY	-	-	-
140 hp, MT, AIR, except Corsa	-	-	-	-	-	-	-	RQ	^{(6)}	RY	AG
140 hp, AT, AIR, except Corsa	-	-	-	-	-	-	-	RX	^{(6)}	RZ	AH
140 hp, MT, Corsa only	-	-	-	-	-	-	RB	RB	-	-	-
140 hp, MT, AC, Corsa only	-	-	-	-	-	-	-	RR	-	-	-
140 hp, MT, AIR, Corsa only	-	-	-	-	-	-	-	RT	-	-	-
180 hp, MT, TC, Corsa only	-	-	-	-	-	-	RL	RL	-	-	-
Notes:^{(1) — Early year code (2) — Late year code (3) — CR change from 8.0:1 to 9.0:1 with engine #T0207. ZD suffix changes to ZF, ZE to ZK. (4) — AC introduced mid-1961 model year. (5) — CR change from 8.0:1 to 9.0:1 with engine #T0109. YD suffix changes to YN, YJ to YQ. (6) — Likely the same as previous year. (7) — CR change from 8.0:1 to 9.0:1 mid-1961. Z suffix changes to ZH. (8) — ZD used again with introduction of AC (9) — AIR mandatory in California for 1966 and 1967, except on 180 hp and AC cars in 1966. (10) — AIR standard on all 1968 and 1969 cars.} Abbreviations:^{AC — Air Conditioning; AIR — Air Injection Reactor; AT — Automatic Transmission (Powerglide); CID — Cubic Inches Displacement; CR — Compression Ratio; FC — Forward Control (Greenbrier, Corvan, Loadside, Rampside); MT — Manual Transmission (3-speed or 4-speed); SW — Station Wagon (Corvair or Lakewood); TC — Turbo-Charged}

== See also ==
- Corvair Powerglide
- List of GM engines
