= Massena Castings Plant =

- Operated: 1959–2009
- Location: Massena, New York
- Coordinates: 44.9843°N 74.73402°W
- Industry: Automotive
- Products: Engine blocks, cylinder heads, crankcases, clutches, pistons
- Owner: General Motors

Massena Castings Plant (also known as the Central Foundry Division) was a General Motors aluminium casting foundry located in Massena, New York. The plant utilized the die casting and lost-foam casting processes, operating from 1959 to May 2009. It was originally built to cast engine blocks and cylinder heads for the Chevrolet Turbo-Air 6 engine used in the Chevrolet Corvair from 1960 until 1969. Aluminum parts included the block, heads, flywheel housing, crankcase cover, clutch housing, and pistons. 92 lb (41.7 kg) of aluminum was used in each engine.

== Overview ==
New casting and machining techniques had to be developed to produce the light-alloy parts. The aluminum parts were cast with a low-pressure casting technique using machines built and installed by Karl Schmidt GmbH of Neckarsulm, Germany. All of the engines were assembled at GM's Tonawanda Engine plant. It was represented by UAW Local 465, Massena, NY. It contributed to the casting needs provided by Saginaw Metal Casting Operations and Defiance Foundry.

After the Corvair was cancelled the factory switched to casting the engine block and cylinder heads for the Chevrolet 2300 engine used in the Chevrolet Vega GM H platform, the Iron Duke engine used in both the GM N platform and GM L platform, and the General Motors 122 engine for the GM J-body cars. The facility was in close proximity to the Alcoa factory and was next to a border entry point between the United States and Canada. The locations boundaries were the St. Lawrence River to the north, the St. Regis Mohawk Reservation to the east, the Raquette River to the south and property owned by Alcoa and CSX to the west. The address is 56 Chevrolet Rd, Rooseveltown, NY 13683. The factory was closed despite efforts to renegotiate a labor contract.
