= Pro-Composites =

American aircraft manufacturer

- Company type: Privately held company
- Industry: Aerospace
- Headquarters: Buffalo Grove, Illinois, United States
- Products: Aircraft plans, parts and kits
- Owner: Scott VanderVeen
- Website: pro-composites.com

Pro-Composites, Inc is an American aircraft manufacturer based in Buffalo Grove, Illinois. The company is owned by Scott VanderVeen and specializes in the design and manufacture of aircraft design plans, parts and kits for amateur construction.

The company was originally formed at and had its flight testing and manufacturing operations in Daytona Beach, Florida, circa 2008. By 2010 operations had been moved to Waukegan Regional Airport, near Chicago, with its business address at Buffalo Grove, Illinois.

The company's designs are all based on the design work of Steve Rahn and his use of pre-formed flat fiberglass and foam composite panels which are then radius bent to shape, a method they refer to as "Fold-a-Plane". The company is currently developing the four seat Pro-Composites Freedom.

== Aircraft ==
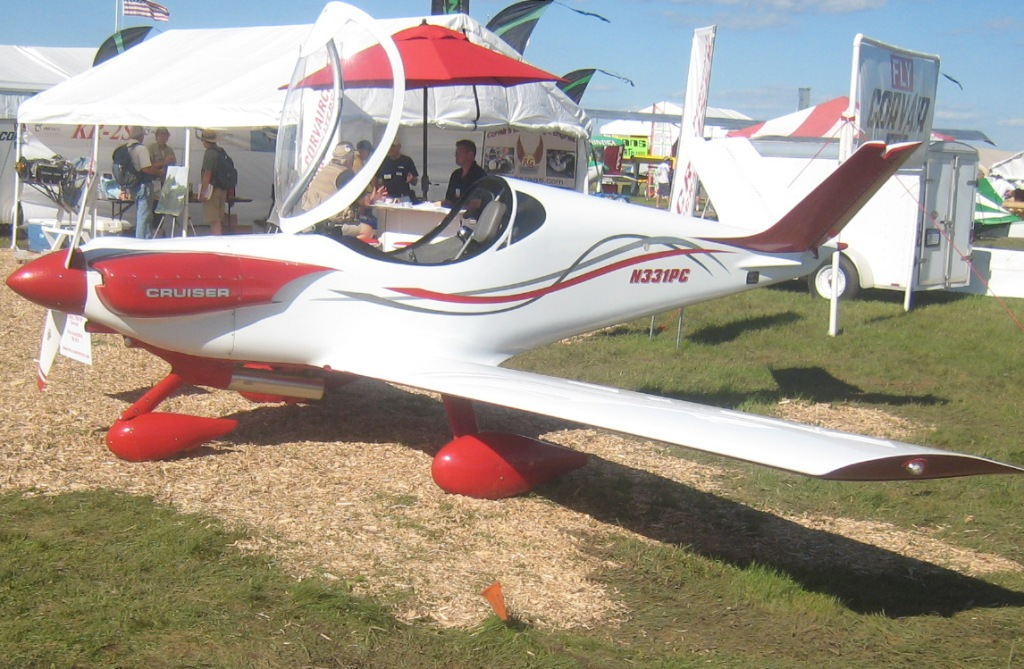
Pro-Composites Personal Cruiser

Summary of aircraft built by Pro-Composites
Model name	First flight	Number built	Type
Pro-Composites Personal Cruiser		1 (2011)	Single seat composite kit aircraft
Pro-Composites Vision			Two seat composite kit aircraft
Pro-Composites Freedom			Four seat composite plans-built aircraft
