= Sport Performance Aviation Panther =

Homebuilt aircraft

Panther
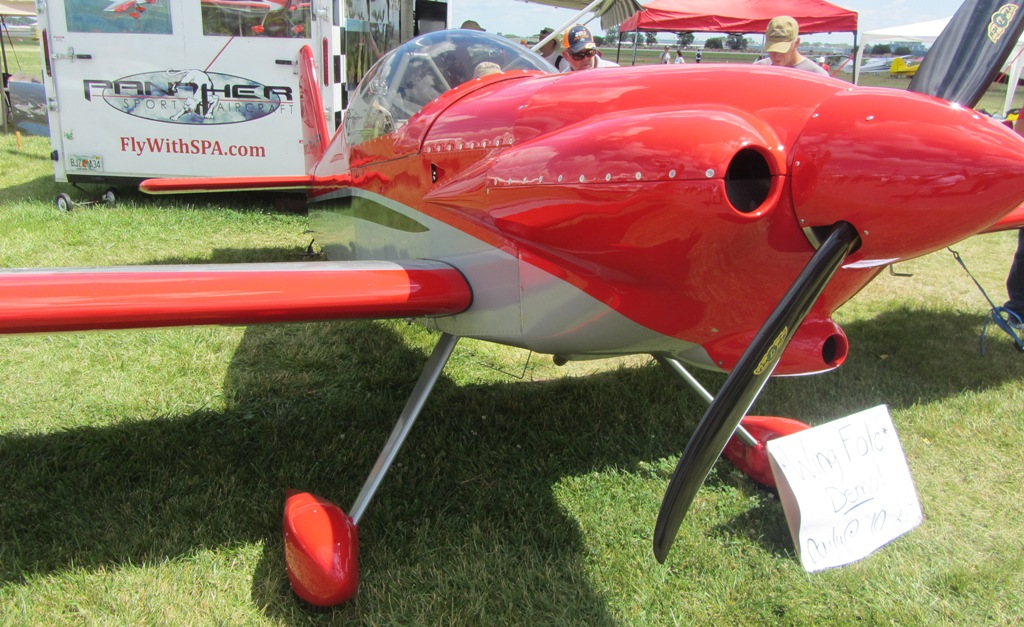

General information
- Type: Homebuilt Aircraft
- National origin: United States
- Manufacturer: Sport Performance Aviation LLC
- Designer: Dan Weseman
- Number built: 25

History
- First flight: 23 April 2013

The Sport Performance Aviation Panther is a single seat, all-metal, homebuilt aircraft under development by Sport Performance Aviation of Green Cove Springs, Florida. The aircraft is intended to be supplied as plans and as a kit for amateur construction.

== Design ==
The Panther is a single seat, low wing aircraft, built of aluminum with a bubble canopy. The forward fuselage is constructed from welded 4130 steel tubing, with the aft fuselage, tail and wings made from 2024-T3 aluminum sheet. The landing gear can be assembled in either tricycle or conventional gear arrangements. The wings are designed to be folded for storage or ground transport. The design can accept engines from 80 to 160 hp (60 to 119 kW).

== Variants ==
Two variants are available, a Light Sport and a standard category.

Panther Sport
21.5 ft (6.6 m) wing span, Engines from 100-160hp with a 1,150 lb (522 kg) gross weight, 27.5 U.S. gallons (104 L; 22.9 imp gal) of fuel.

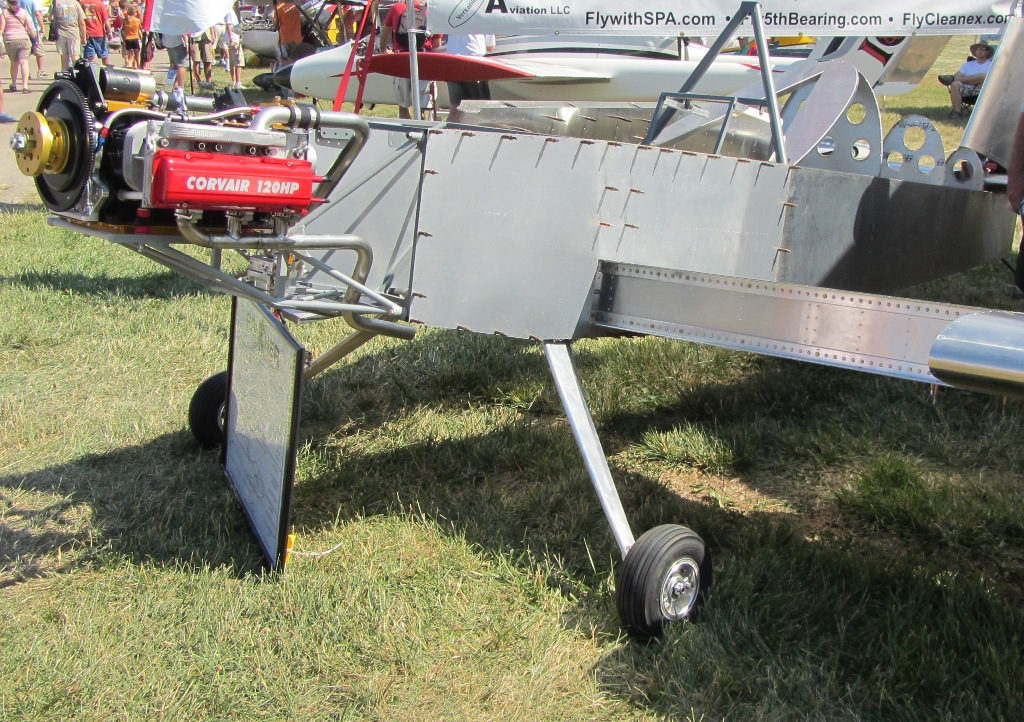
Panther LSA

Panther LSA
23.5 ft (7.2 m) wing span, Engine options from 100-130hp, 21–27.5 U.S. gallons (79–104 L; 17.5–22.9 imp gal) of fuel. Meets performance requirements for the US light-sport aircraft category.

== Specifications (Panther LSA) ==
Data from EAA

General characteristics

- Crew: 1
- Length: 19 ft (5.8 m)
- Wingspan: 23.5 ft (7.2 m)
- Wing area: 93 sq ft (8.6 m^{2})
- Empty weight: 700–775 lb (318–352 kg) Note: Empty weight varies with powerplant and equipment options
- Gross weight: 1,115 lb (506 kg) (Note: Any weight above 1015 lbs. must be due to fuel in wings)
- Fuel capacity: 21–27.5 U.S. gallons (79–104 L; 17.5–22.9 imp gal)
- Powerplant: 1 × Chevrolet Corvair engine conversion. Possible engines, Corvair, TCM O-200/O-240, Franklin 4B-235, Lycoming 0-233/0-235, various UL Power, Jabiru 3300. horizontally opposed piston engine, 100–130 hp (75–97 kW)

Performance

- Maximum speed: 160 kn (180 mph, 290 km/h)
- Cruise speed: 140–160 kn (160–180 mph, 260–290 km/h)
- Stall speed: 44 kn (51 mph, 82 km/h) TAS
- Never exceed speed: 170 kn (200 mph, 320 km/h)
- g limits: +6/-3
- Wing loading: 11.99 lb/sq ft (58.5 kg/m^{2})

== See also ==
Aircraft of comparable role, configuration, and era

- Sonex Aircraft Sonex
- Van's RV-3
