= Hegy Propellers =

American aircraft propeller manufacturer

- Company type: Private company
- Industry: Aerospace
- Founder: Ray Hegy
- Fate: Out of business
- Headquarters: Marfa, Texas, United States
- Products: Aircraft propellers

Hegy Propellers, founded by Ray Hegy, was an American manufacturer of wooden propellers for homebuilt and ultralight aircraft. The company headquarters was located in Marfa, Texas.

Hegy built fixed-pitch two and four bladed propellers with diameters from 12 to 120 in (30 to 305 cm) for Continental engines, Volkswagen air-cooled engines and Chevrolet Corvair engines. Propellers were made from birch and maple.

== History ==
Ray Hegy worked in Milwaukee, building propellers for iceboats. This experience qualified him to respond to an ad "for cabinetmakers to build wooden craft propellers" in 1925. Ray Hegy bought his first plane, a Waco-10, in 1928. In 1957, Hegy started building the Chuparosa and was finished after nine years at a cost of $600. The success of the Chuparosa changed Hegy "from a furniture maker and refinisher to a full-time carver of wooden propellers." At that time, Hegy made his propellers in his backyard workshop.

== See also ==
- List of aircraft propeller manufacturers
