= Pro-Composites Vision =

American homebuilt aircraft

Vision

General information
- Type: Amateur-built aircraft
- National origin: United States
- Manufacturer: American Affordable Aircraft; Pro-Composites
- Designer: Steve Rahm
- Status: In production (2015)

History
- Introduction date: 1994

The Pro-Composites Vision is an American amateur-built aircraft, designed by Steve Rahm and produced by Pro-Composites of Buffalo Grove, Illinois. The aircraft is supplied in the form of plans for amateur construction, with some pre-formed parts made available to speed construction.

The design was originally marketed by American Affordable Aircraft of Daytona Beach.

== Design and development ==
The Vision features a cantilever low wing, a two-seats-in-side-by-side configuration cockpit under a bubble canopy, fixed conventional landing gear or optional tricycle gear with wheel pants and a single engine in tractor configuration.

The Vision SP model is made from pre-formed flat fiberglass and foam composite panels which are then radius bent to shape. Its 21.75 ft (6.6 m) span wing employs a NACA 63A-415 airfoil at the wing root, transitioning to a NACA 63A-412 airfoil at the wing tip. The wing has an area of 85 sq ft (7.9 m^{2}), with the cockpit up to 46 in (117 cm) in width. The tricycle landing gear version features a fully castering nosewheel and differential braking for steering. The aircraft can accept engines of 100 to 160 hp (75 to 119 kW) and the 100 hp (75 kW) Subaru Stratus, 108 to 116 hp (81 to 87 kW) Lycoming O-235 and 150 to 160 hp (112 to 119 kW) Lycoming O-320 have been used.

The manufacturer markets the design as "the only all composite, plans built, 2 seat sport aircraft that uses a conventional - non canard - platform."

== Variants ==
Vision SP
Model with a short wing of 21.75 ft (6.6 m) span, an area of 85 sq ft (7.9 m^{2}) and an aspect ratio of 5.5:1.
Vision EX
Model with a longer wing of 25.5 ft (7.8 m) span, an area of 96 sq ft (8.9 m^{2}) and an aspect ratio of 6.6:1, optimized for higher altitude flying, carrying heavier loads and operation by less experienced pilots.

== Specifications (Vision SP) ==
Data from Bayerl and Pro-Composites

General characteristics

- Crew: one
- Capacity: one passenger
- Wingspan: 21 ft 8 in (6.60 m)
- Wing area: 85 sq ft (7.9 m^{2})
- Aspect ratio: 5.5:1
- Airfoil: Root: NACA 63A-415, tip: NACA 63A-412
- Empty weight: 950 lb (431 kg)
- Gross weight: 1,350 lb (612 kg)
- Fuel capacity: 22 U.S. gallons (83 L; 18 imp gal) with a total of 40 U.S. gallons (150 L; 33 imp gal) optional
- Powerplant: 1 × Subaru Stratus air-cooled, four stroke automotive conversion, 100 hp (75 kW)

Performance

- Maximum speed: 170 mph (273 km/h, 147 kn)
- Cruise speed: 155 mph (249 km/h, 134 kn)
- Stall speed: 55 mph (89 km/h, 48 kn)
- Never exceed speed: 207 mph (333 km/h, 180 kn)
- g limits: +6/-4 at 1,250 lb (567 kg)
- Rate of climb: 1,400 ft/min (7.1 m/s)
- Wing loading: 15.9 lb/sq ft (78 kg/m^{2})
