= Pro-Composites Freedom =

American homebuilt aircraft

Freedom

General information
- Type: Amateur-built aircraft
- National origin: United States
- Manufacturer: Pro-Composites
- Status: Prototype under construction (2012)
- Number built: none

The Pro-Composites Freedom is an American amateur-built aircraft, under development by Pro-Composites of Buffalo Grove, Illinois. The aircraft is intended to be supplied in the form of plans for amateur construction, with some pre-formed parts made available to speed construction.

== Design and development ==
The aircraft features a cantilever low-wing, a four-seat enclosed cabin accessed by doors, fixed tricycle landing gear with wheel pants and a single engine in tractor configuration.

The aircraft is made from pre-formed flat fiberglass and foam composite panels which are then radius bent to shape. Its 30 ft (9.1 m) span wing employs a NACA 63A-214 airfoil at the wing root, transitioning to a NACA 63A-212 airfoil at the wing tip. The wing has an area of 134 sq ft (12.4 m^{2}) and the cabin will be 46 in (117 cm) in width. The landing gear features a fully castering nosewheel and differential braking for steering. The aircraft has been designed for engines of 180 to 320 hp (134 to 239 kW).

The manufacturer markets the design as "the only composite, plans built, 4 seat aircraft that uses a conventional - non canard - platform. It can be constructed entirely from the manuals using raw materials or from pre-formed parts."

== Specifications (Freedom) ==
Data from Bayerl and Pro-Composites

General characteristics

- Crew: one
- Capacity: three passengers
- Wingspan: 30 ft (9.1 m)
- Wing area: 134 sq ft (12.4 m^{2})
- Aspect ratio: 7:1
- Airfoil: Root: NACA 63A-214, tip: NACA 63A-212
- Empty weight: 1,450 lb (658 kg)
- Gross weight: 2,800 lb (1,270 kg)
- Fuel capacity: 65 U.S. gallons (250 L; 54 imp gal)
- Powerplant: 1 × four stroke aircraft engine of 180 to 320 hp (134 to 239 kW) ,

Performance

- Cruise speed: 210 mph (340 km/h, 180 kn) with upper power range engine
- Never exceed speed: 234 mph (377 km/h, 203 kn)
- g limits: +4.5/-3 at 2,700 lb (1,225 kg)
- Wing loading: 20.9 lb/sq ft (102 kg/m^{2})
