= Azalea Saberwing =

American amateur-built aircraft

Saberwing
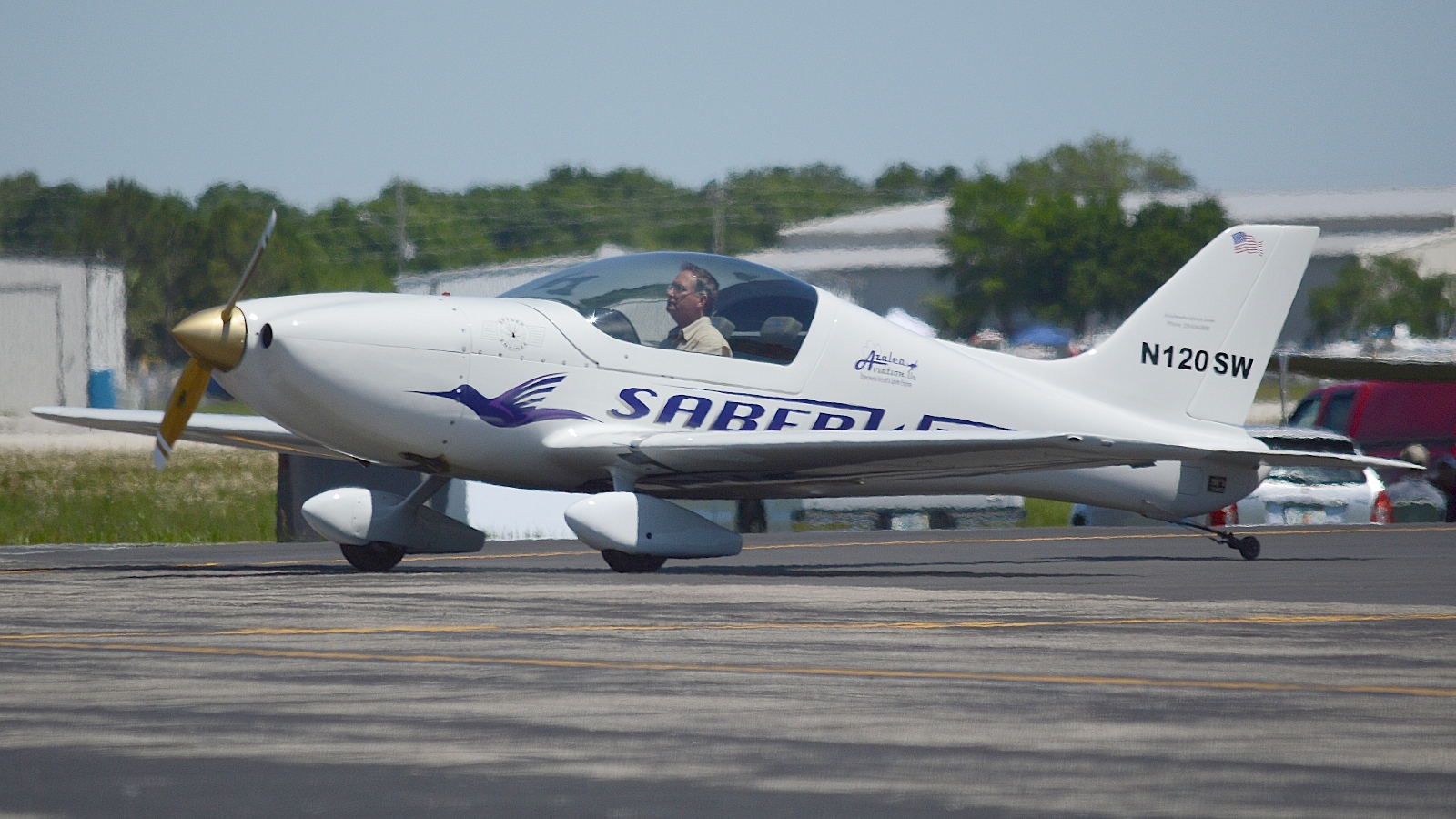

General information
- Type: Amateur-built aircraft
- National origin: United States
- Manufacturer: Azalea Aviation
- Status: In production (2020)
- Number built: four (2020)

History
- Introduction date: 2015

The Azalea Saberwing, named for the species of hummingbird, is an American amateur-built aircraft, designed and produced by Azalea Aviation of Adel, Georgia, introduced at Sun 'n Fun in 2015. The aircraft is supplied as a kit for amateur construction.

== Design and development ==
The Saberwing features a cantilever low-wing, a two-seats-in-side-by-side configuration enclosed cockpit under a bubble canopy, fixed conventional landing gear or optionally tricycle landing gear, with wheel pants and a single engine in tractor configuration.

The aircraft is made from a composite-foam sandwich with the wing spars and wing ribs made from a wood-composite sandwich. The design has been optimized for a low parts-count to simplify construction. Its 26 ft (7.9 m) span wing, has an area of 92 sq ft (8.5 m^{2}) and mounts flaps. The cabin is 43 in (109 cm) in width. The standard engine used is the in-house developed 100 hp (75 kW) Spyder Corvair automotive conversion four-stroke powerplant.

The manufacturer estimates that building the aircraft from the supplied kit requires 500-1,000 hours of labor at a total completion cost of US$40,000-50,000.

== Operational history ==
Reviewers Roy Beisswenger and Marino Boric described the design in a 2015 review as "sleek" and "elegant".

By September 2020, four examples had been registered in the United States with the Federal Aviation Administration.

== Specifications (Saberwing) ==
Data from Tacke and manufacturer

General characteristics

- Crew: one
- Capacity: one passenger
- Length: 20 ft (6.1 m)
- Wingspan: 26 ft (7.9 m)
- Wing area: 92 sq ft (8.5 m^{2})
- Empty weight: 750 lb (340 kg)
- Gross weight: 1,500 lb (680 kg)
- Fuel capacity: 40 U.S. gallons (150 L; 33 imp gal)
- Powerplant: 1 × Spyder Corvair automotive conversion six cylinder, air-cooled, four stroke automotive engine, 100 hp (75 kW)
- Propellers: 2-bladed fixed pitch

Performance

- Cruise speed: 150 mph (240 km/h, 130 kn)
- Stall speed: 45 mph (72 km/h, 39 kn) flaps down
- Never exceed speed: 200 mph (320 km/h, 170 kn)
- Wing loading: 16.3 lb/sq ft (80 kg/m^{2})

== See also ==
- List of aerobatic aircraft
