= Flat-ten engine =

Horizontally-opposed ten-cylinder piston engine

A flat-ten engine (also known as a horizontally opposed-ten) is a ten-cylinder piston engine with five cylinders on each side of a central crankshaft, arranged at a 180° angle.

Production of flat engines has been exhibited through a number and variety of cars since as early as 1887, when German engineer Karl Benz created a boxer-twin design, dubbed the kontra engine. Since then, multiple automotives have used these horizontally opposed engines, with a reference of the most notable of such being the Porsche 911. Although the production of these boxer engines covers the extent of two to twelve-cylinders, there has never been a known flat-10 to enter a production vehicle.

Through the early 1960s, Chevrolet built several prototype flat-ten engines as part of an aborted program for family of Modular Engines to replace the Chevrolet Turbo-Air 6 flat-six engine. This development program investigated flat engines with between two and twelve cylinders, with the flat-ten version being known as "P-10" ("pancake" engine).Although the program was initially intended to develop an engine for the 1964 Chevrolet Corvair (which is rear-engined with rear-wheel drive), the flat-ten version was fitted to an experimental 1962 Chevrolet Impala (a front-engined car which was converted to front-wheel drive).
