= Tonawanda Engine =

General Motors engine factory in Buffalo, New York

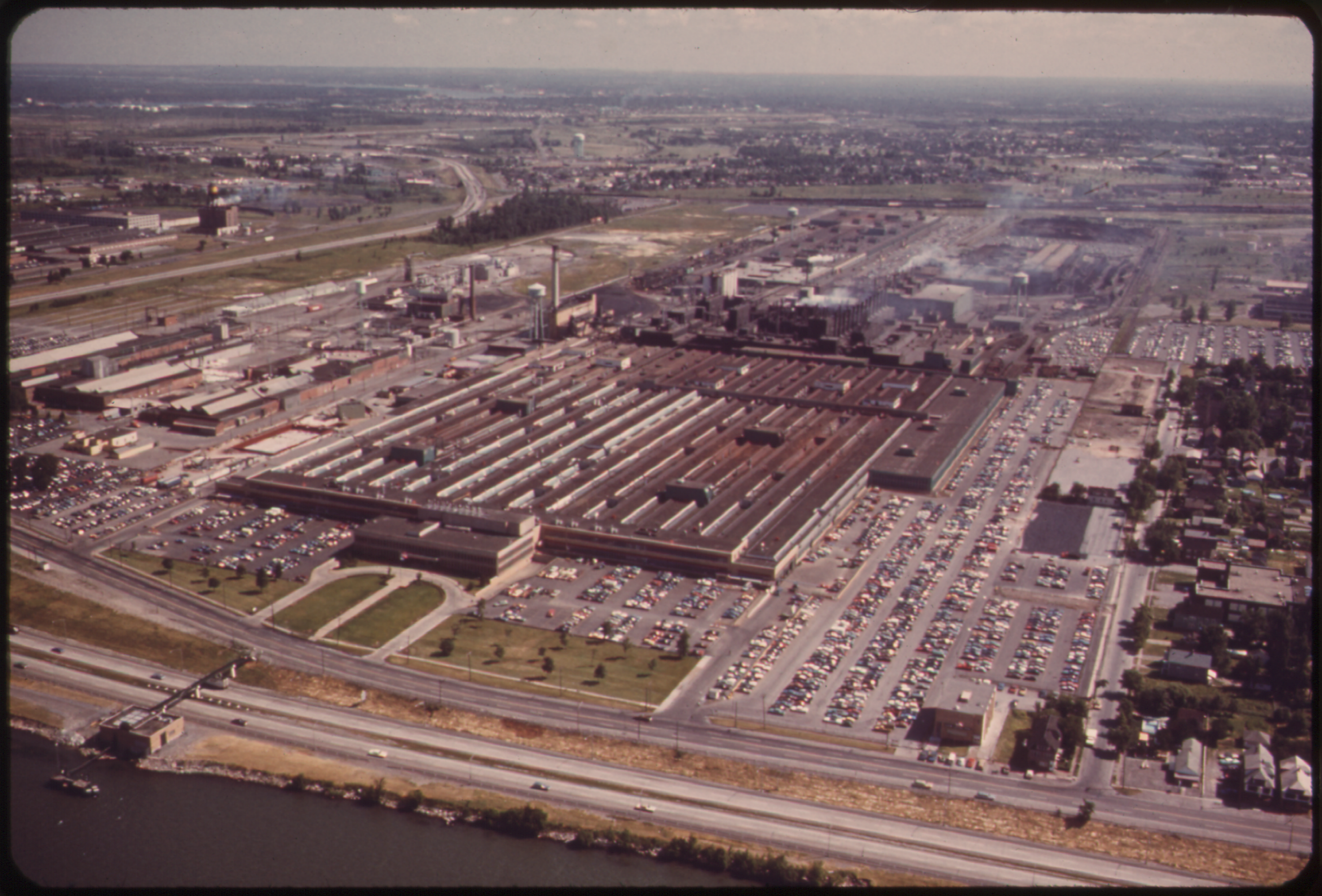
- The front of Tonawanda Engine, 1973
- Formation: 1938
- Purpose: Production of engines for GM
- Location(s): 2995 River Road Buffalo, NY
- Coordinates: 42°57′54″N 78°54′37″W
- Region served: Worldwide
- Parent organization: General Motors
- Staff: 1735

Tonawanda Engine (now known as Tonawanda Propulsion) is a General Motors engine factory in Buffalo, New York. The plant consists of three facilities totaling 3.1 million square feet (290,000 m^{2}) and sits upon 190 acres (77 ha). The factory receives cast engine blocks from Defiance Foundry in Defiance, Ohio and Saginaw Metal Casting Operations in Saginaw, Michigan, and received engine block castings and cylinder heads from the former Massena Castings Plant in Massena, New York.

== History ==
The campus houses three different engine plants. Plant #1, located at 2995 River Road in Buffalo, was built in 1938; Plant #4, located at 2390 Kenmore Avenue, was built in 1941; and Plant #5, located at 240 Vulcan Street, was built in 2001.

== Investments ==
- 2010 $425 million for the next Generation Ecotec 2.0:/2.5L
- 2010 $400 million for a new V-8 small block engine
- 2020 $6.7 million for upgrades to GenV engine program
- 2025 $888 million for the sixth generation of GM's V-8 engines

== Products ==
- Ecotec Gen III
  - 2.0L Turbo
  - 2.5L
- Small-Block Engine GenV
  - 4.3L V6 Truck & Marine
  - 5.3L V8 Truck
  - 6.2L V8 Truck
  - 6.2L V8 LT1, LT4, LT2
  - 6.6L V8 HD Truck
- Small-Block Engine Gen 6
  - Production to begin in 2027

Total engines produced since 1938 – 77 Million as of Summer 2025

On August 5, 2025, Tonawanda Propulsion made its 77 millionth engine, an LT2.

=== Product applications ===
- Ecotec Gen III
  - Buick: Regal
  - Cadillac: ATS and CTS
  - Chevrolet: Malibu, Impala, and Camaro
  - Opel: Insignia
- Small Block Gen V
  - Chevrolet: Silverado
  - GMC: Sierra
- LT1 & LT4
  - Chevrolet: Corvette, Camaro

== Awards ==
- Ward's Best Engines 2014 - 6.2L LT1 Small Block GenV
- Ward's Best Engines 2013 - 2.0L Turbo Ecotec GenII
- Ken-Ton Chamber of Commerce Green Globe Award for being a leader in Green Manufacturing, 2013
- EPA ENERGY STAR Challenge for Industry Recipient, 2010
- Certificate of Appreciation from WNY Chapter 77 Vietnam Veterans of American Chapter

== Employee information ==
- Hourly: 1,498
- Salary: 237
- Union Local: UAW Local 774

== See also ==
- List of GM factories
