= Pro-Composites Personal Cruiser =

Personal Cruiser
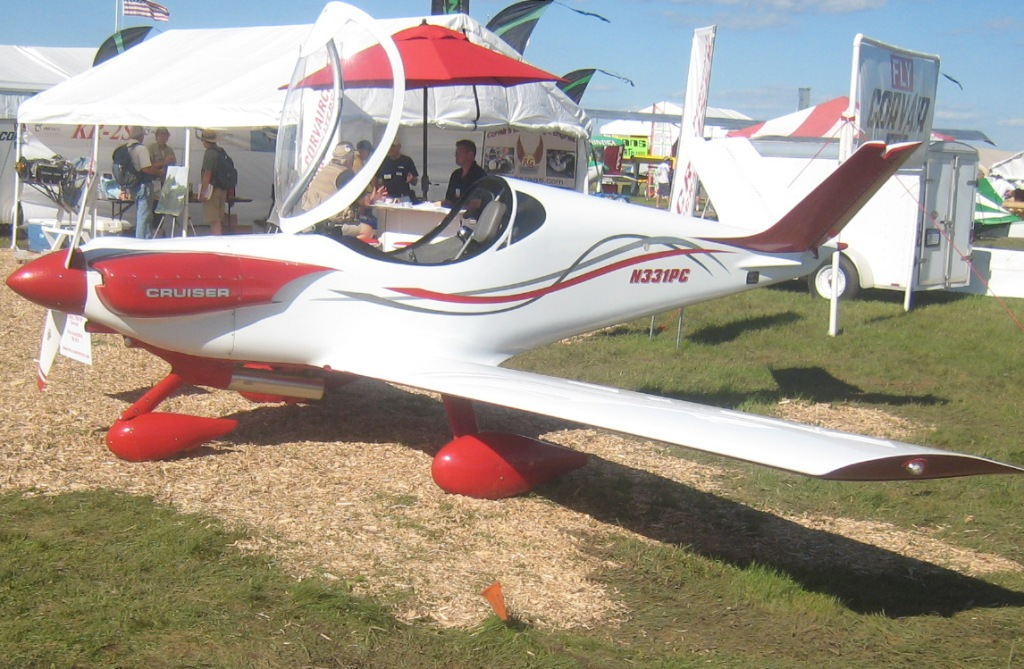

General information
- Type: Homebuilt aircraft
- National origin: United States
- Manufacturer: Pro-Composites
- Designer: Steve Rahm
- Status: In production (2015)

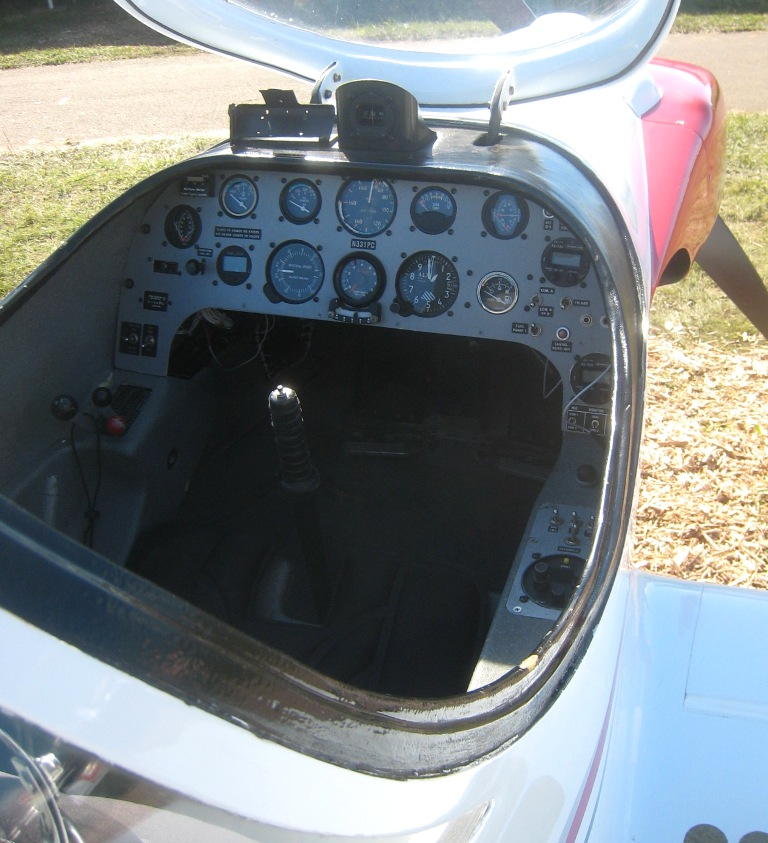
Personal Cruiser instrument panel

The Pro-Composites Personal Cruiser, also called the Corvair Cruiser, is a single seat, composite homebuilt aircraft.

== Design and development ==
The Personal Cruiser is a single place, low-wing, tricycle gear aircraft with a V-tail.

The composite aircraft is built using the FOLDaPLANE method. The method uses flexible flat composite panels that are radius-bent to form stiff fuselage sections inside a jig. Building time is estimated at 800 hours.

The aircraft is designed for powerplants up to 250 lb (113 kg) in weight and has an acceptable power range of 65 to 115 hp (48 to 86 kW). The 100 hp (75 kW) Corvair air-cooled four stroke automotive conversion is commonly employed.

== Specifications (Personal Cruiser) ==
Data from Contact! and Bayerl

General characteristics

- Crew: one
- Length: 17 ft 4 in (5.28 m)
- Wingspan: 25.5 ft (7.8 m)
- Wing area: 76.5 sq ft (7.11 m^{2})
- Airfoil: Eppler
- Empty weight: 750 lb (340 kg)
- Gross weight: 1,250 lb (567 kg)
- Fuel capacity: 18 U.S. gallons (68 L; 15 imp gal)
- Powerplant: 1 × Chevrolet Turbo-Air 6 engine automotive conversion, 100 hp (75 kW)
- Propellers: 2-bladed Ground adjustable

Performance

- Maximum speed: 120 kn (140 mph, 230 km/h)
- Cruise speed: 128 kn (147 mph, 237 km/h)
- Stall speed: 46 kn (53 mph, 85 km/h)
- Never exceed speed: 184 kn (212 mph, 341 km/h)
- Rate of climb: 1,800 ft/min (9.1 m/s)
