= Rheinmetall Automotive =

Company in Neckarsulm

- Native name: Rheinmetall Automotive AG
- Type: stock corporation
- ISIN: DE0007037905
- Industry: First-tier auto component supplier
- Founded: 1997
- Defunct: 2021
- Headquarters: Neckarsulm, Germany
- Number of employees: around 11,000 (2019)
- Website: www.rheinmetall-automotive.com

Rheinmetall Automotive (formerly KSPG and Kolbenschmidt Pierburg) was the Automotive sector of the parent group Rheinmetall. The company emerged in 1997 through the merger of KS Kolbenschmidt GmbH, Neckarsulm, and Pierburg GmbH, Neuss. Hence, at its various traditional locations the company is commonly known as Kolbenschmidt or Pierburg. In 2019, 40 production plants in Europe, the Americas, Japan, India and China employed a total workforce of around 11,000. Products were developed in cooperation with international auto manufacturers. Rheinmetall Automotive ranked among the 100 biggest auto industry suppliers worldwide and was an important partner to the industry for such products as exhaust gas recirculation systems, secondary-air systems, coolant pumps, and pistons for car gasoline engines and as well as for the commercial vehicle sector.

== Divisions ==
The company had three divisions:

- "Hardparts" includes business in pistons also for cars and commercial vehicles, large-bore pistons, engine blocks, cylinder heads, as well as other castings, plain bearings, and continuous castings
- "Mechatronics" specializes in emission-reduction modules and assemblies, solenoid valves and actuators, as well as products for trucks and offroaders.
- "Motorservice" is responsible for global aftermarket business with engine repairers and independent workshops in over 130 countries

== Corporate history ==
=== Kolbenschmidt ===
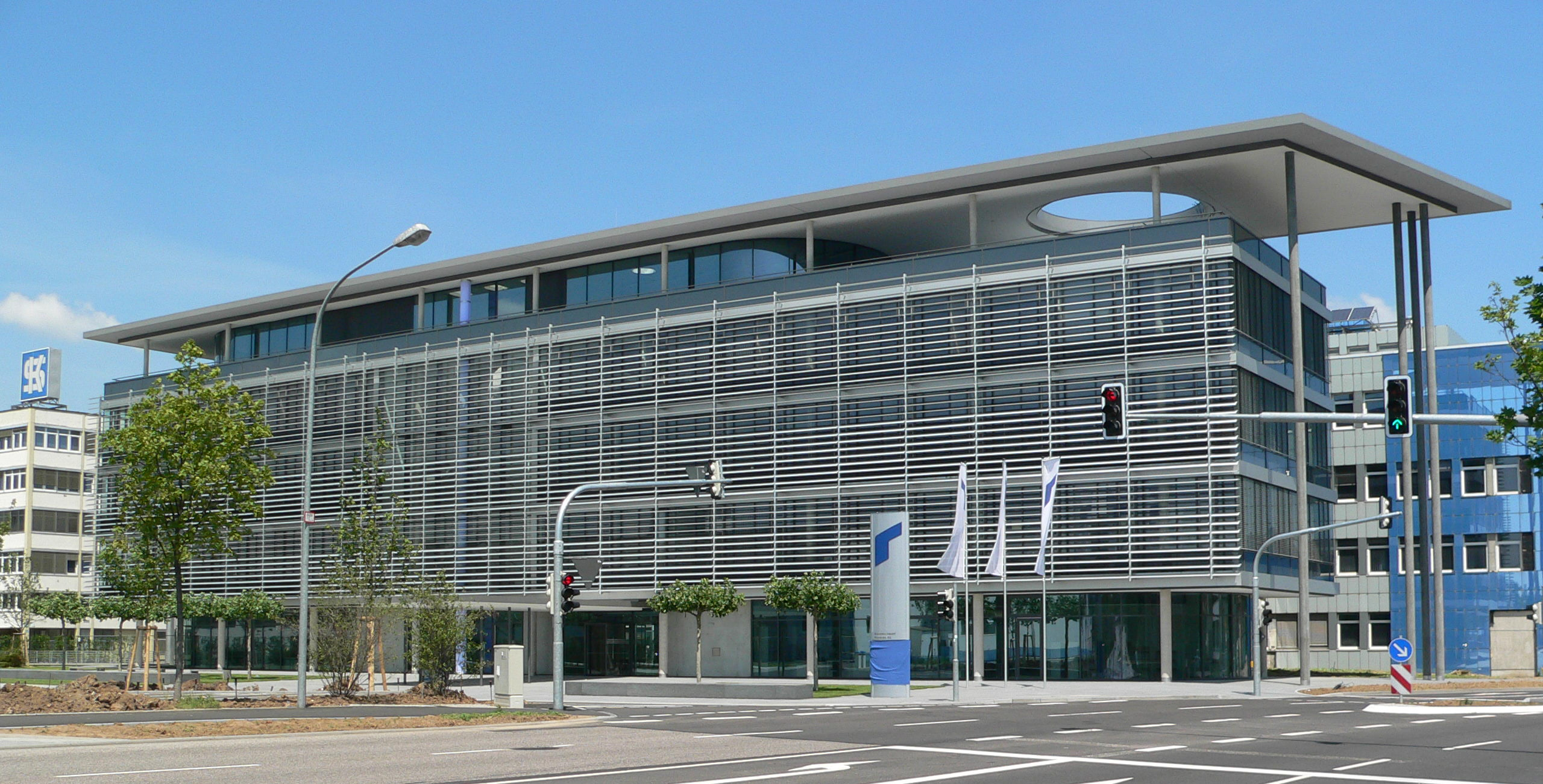
Headquarter in Neckarsulm

Karl Schmidt (1876 to 1954), son of NSU- founder Christian Schmidt, established in Heilbronn, Germany, on April 1, 1910, Deutsche Ölfeuerungswerke. Schmidt had served an apprenticeship at NSU in Neckarsulm and at Austin in Birmingham, UK. At NSU he was a senior engineer and authorized signatory. He was awarded a patent for an oil-fired metal-smelting furnace, went on to produce smelting furnaces besides processing aluminium scrap. In 1917, he moved to Neckarsulm where he expanded his enterprise and also manufactured blank pistons for the auto industry. In 1924 and for the repeated expansion of the business Frankfurt-based Metallgesellschaft acquired a majority stake in the company. Its founder Karl Schmidt withdrew in 1927. The production of finished pistons commenced in 1934; in 1937, the Furnace division was sold off. In the course of an air raid in March 1945, the Neckarsulm plant was almost totally destroyed but then rebuilt after the War. Until February 1948, the plant, which was undergoing reconstruction, was confiscated for reparation purposes and up to April 1949 its assets were frozen. In 1951, around 1,100 people were employed at Kolbenschmidt's Neckarsulm plant and another 500 in Hamburg. The company grew steadily in the 1950s and early 1960s. Growth stagnated slightly during the recession of 1966/67 although with five plants and altogether 5,400 employees, Kolbenschmidt was in 1969 Europe's biggest aluminium caster and market leader among the manufacturers of pistons and bearings.

1972 saw the introduction of NC machinery and starting from 1976 CAD programs. In 1978, annual sales topped DM 500 million. In the 1980s, the company expanded abroad and as a consequence, group sales surged. Late in the 1980s, group sales exceeded DM 1 billion for the first time, reaching DM 1.288 billion in fiscal 1988/89, with non-German sales accounting for 42.1 percent. In 1989, Kolbenschmidt AG had a workforce of 6,389, including 3,412 at the parent plant in Neckarsulm.

KSPG AG is still in the immediate vicinity of Audi AG and the two together provide more than one-half of the just under 30,000 jobs at Neckarsulm.

=== Pierburg ===
On March 25, 1909, Bernhard Pierburg (1869 to 1942) and his brothers, Heinrich-Hermann and Wilhelm, founded a steel trading enterprise by the name of Gebr. Pierburg oHG at Wilmersdorf near Berlin. In 1923, this general partnership was transformed into a stock corporation. In 1926 Pierburg acquired the bankrupt Arthur Haendler & Cie., an enterprise that manufactured carburetors under license of Solex. In 1928, Alfred Pierburg (1903–1975) developed a proprietary carburetor that was installed in Hanomag vehicles. Deutsche Vergaser-Gesellschaft (DVG) was formed in 1935, a company that was to operate separately from the steel trading business. 1938 saw the liquidation of Pierburg AG. In the 1930s, Hitler and his regime awarded significant arms contracts to DVG when they pushed ahead with the rearmament of the Wehrmacht. Alfred Pierburg was promoted to the position of Wehrwirtschaftsführer West, in charge of the arms industry in the West and responsible for coordinating arms production in occupied France (1940–1944).
In 1945, DVG's production facilities were moved from Berlin to Lausitz where at the close of the War they were confiscated and dismantled by the SMAD (Soviet Military Administration in Germany).
In the postwar years, Pierburg succeeded in setting up a modern company at Neuss and in West Berlin that with the production of carburetors once again grew to a significant size. In the 1970s, the Neuss plant saw one of the first wildcat strikes in West Germany. Several hundred migrant female workers went on strike.

In 1986, Pierburg was taken over by Rheinmetall AG.
