= Chevrolet Corvair 95 =

Motor vehicle model name used by Chevrolet

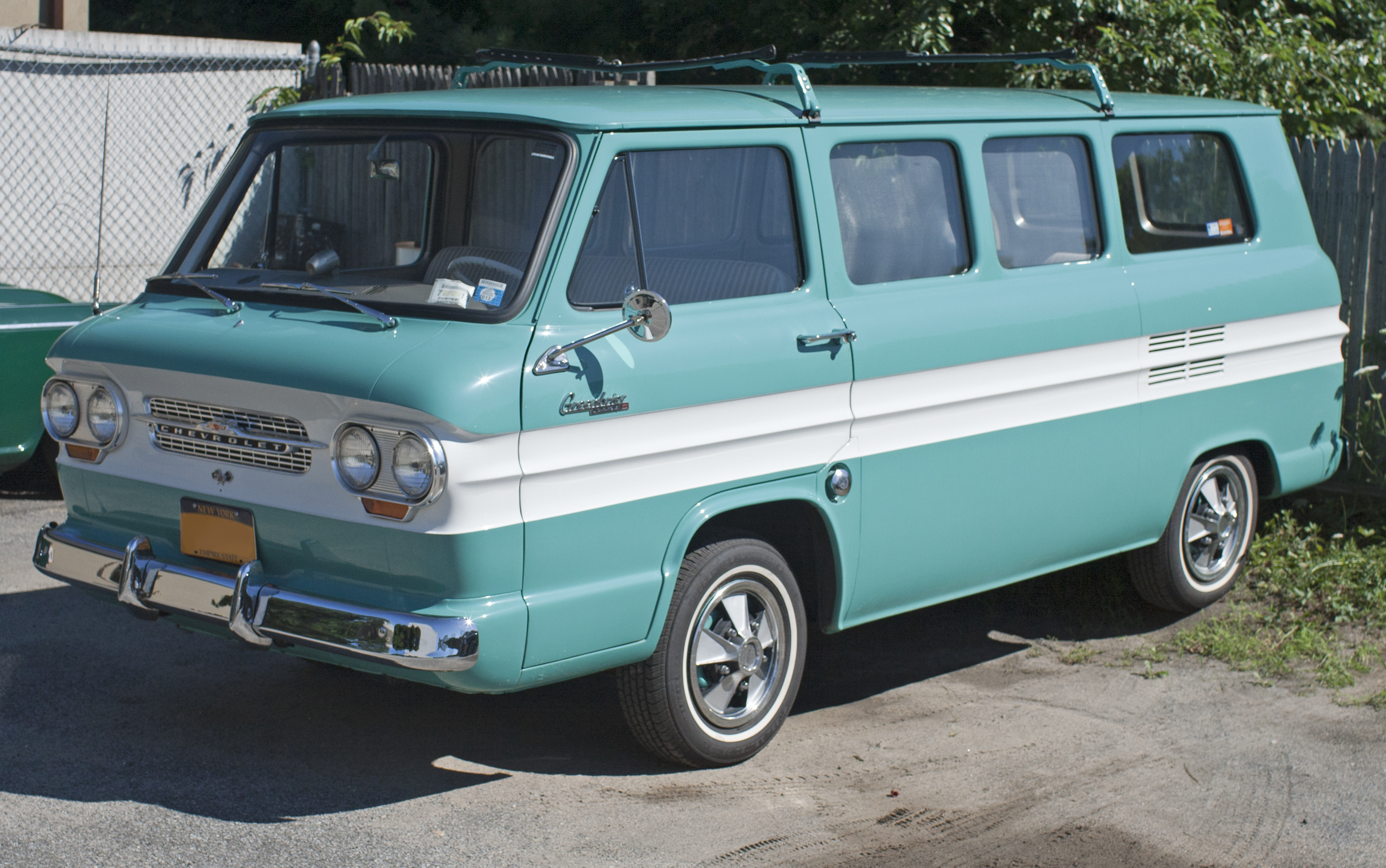
- 1964 Chevrolet Corvair Greenbrier Sportswagon

Overview
- Manufacturer: Chevrolet
- Also called: Corvan; Greenbrier; Corvair Rampside; Corvair Loadside
- Production: 1961–1965

Body and chassis
- Body style: 6-door van; 8-door van; 2-door pickup truck; 2-door 'Rampside' pickup truck
- Layout: RR layout
- Platform: Z-body
- Related: Chevrolet Corvair

Powertrain
- Engine: 2.4 L Turbo-Air 6 H6; 2.7 L Turbo-Air H6
- Transmission: 2-speed Corvair Powerglide automatic; 3-speed manual; 4-speed manual

Dimensions
- Wheelbase: 95 in (2,413 mm)
- Length: Van: 179.7 in (4,564 mm) Pickup: 179.75 in (4,566 mm)
- Width: 70 in (1,778 mm)
- Height: Van: 68.5 in (1,740 mm); Pickup: 70.8 in (1,798 mm)

Chronology
- Successor: Van: Chevrolet Van; Pickup: Chevrolet El Camino (second generation)

The Chevrolet Corvair 95 is a subseries of the Chevrolet Corvair line produced from 1961 until 1965. It is the general term applied to the van and pickup truck variants of the rear-engined Corvair, named for their shortened 95 in (2,413 mm) wheelbase. It was Chevrolet’s first attempt at a van as well as their first and only van-based pickup truck in North America.

== Overview ==
Chevrolet introduced the Corvair lineup for the 1960 model year as the first of a series of generations of passenger compact cars. Chevrolet introduced a more utilitarian style of vehicle the following year under the model designation "Corvair 95". In appearance and design, the cars were similar to the competing Volkswagen Transporter, which was essentially a bus-like adaptation of the Volkswagen Beetle that moved the driver over the front wheels, known as forward control or cab-over.

The air-cooled horizontally opposed Chevrolet Turbo-Air 6 engine was located in the rear of the vehicle under a slightly raised cargo floor. It was similar in principle to the 4-cylinder engine of the Volkswagen, but unusual for most contemporary cars. The 145 cu in (2,375 cc) engine developed 80 hp (60 kW) at 4,400 rpm. Engine size was increased to 164 cu in (2,683 cc) for the 1964 model year, raising output to 95 hp (71 kW). Unlike the Corvair cars, the Corvair Greenbrier had a 95 in (2,413 mm) wheelbase, thus known as "95s." They came standard with a three-speed manual transmission. Optional was a two-speed Corvair Powerglide automatic transmission that was different from the usual Powerglide). Chevrolet eventually made available a four-speed manual transmission.

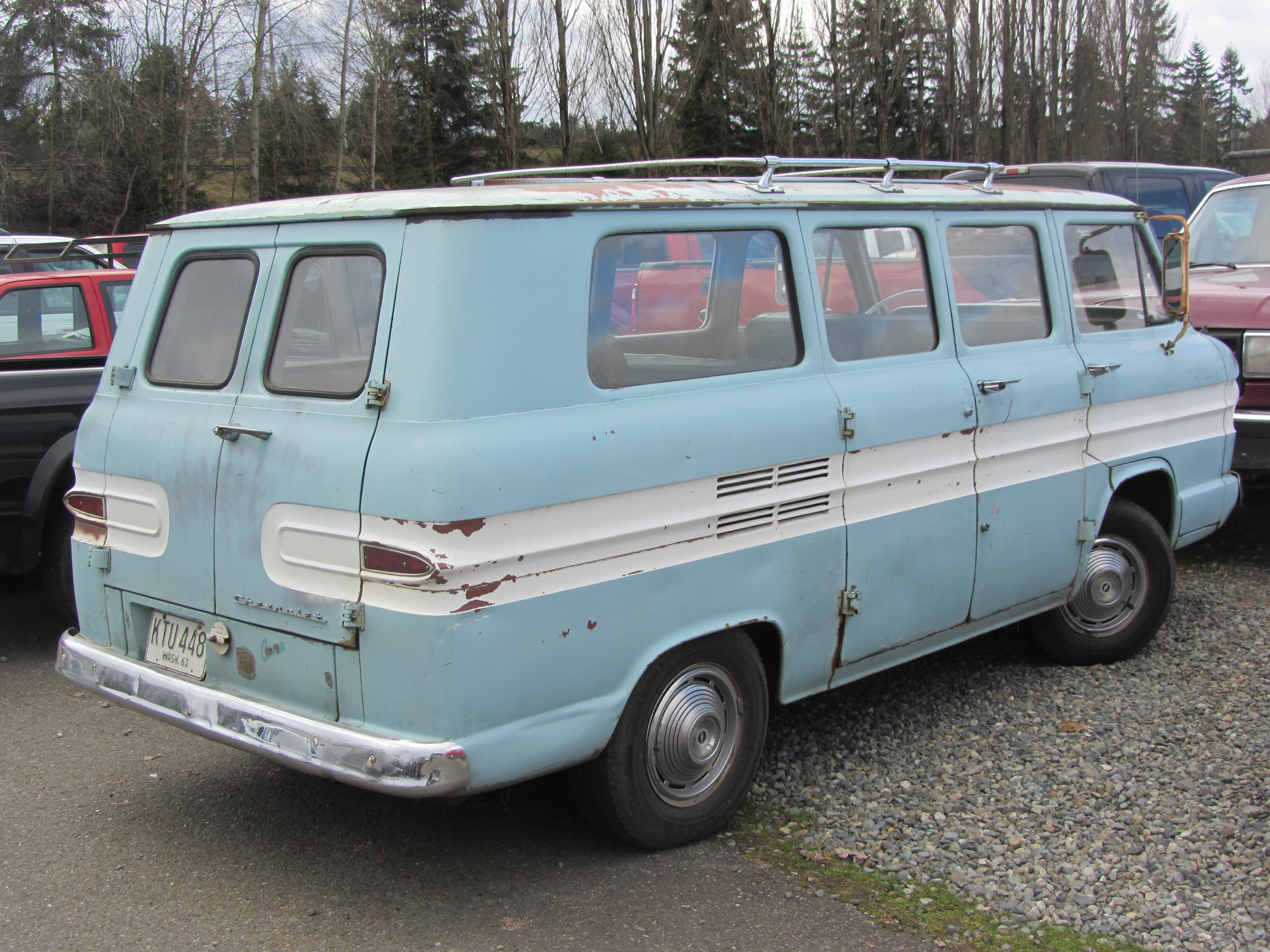
Greenbrier (US)

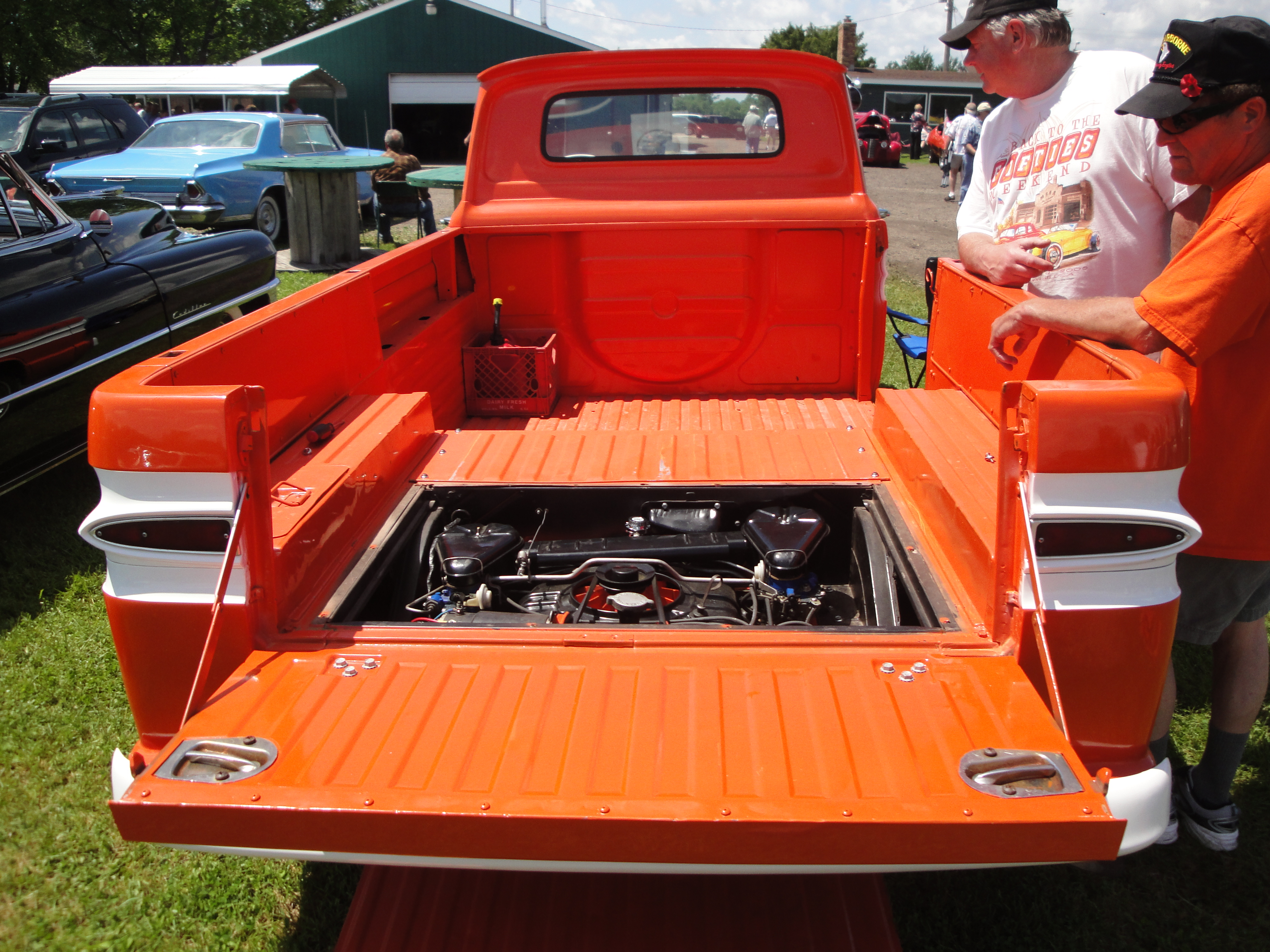
1962 Rampside Pickup – rear engine placement under loadbed

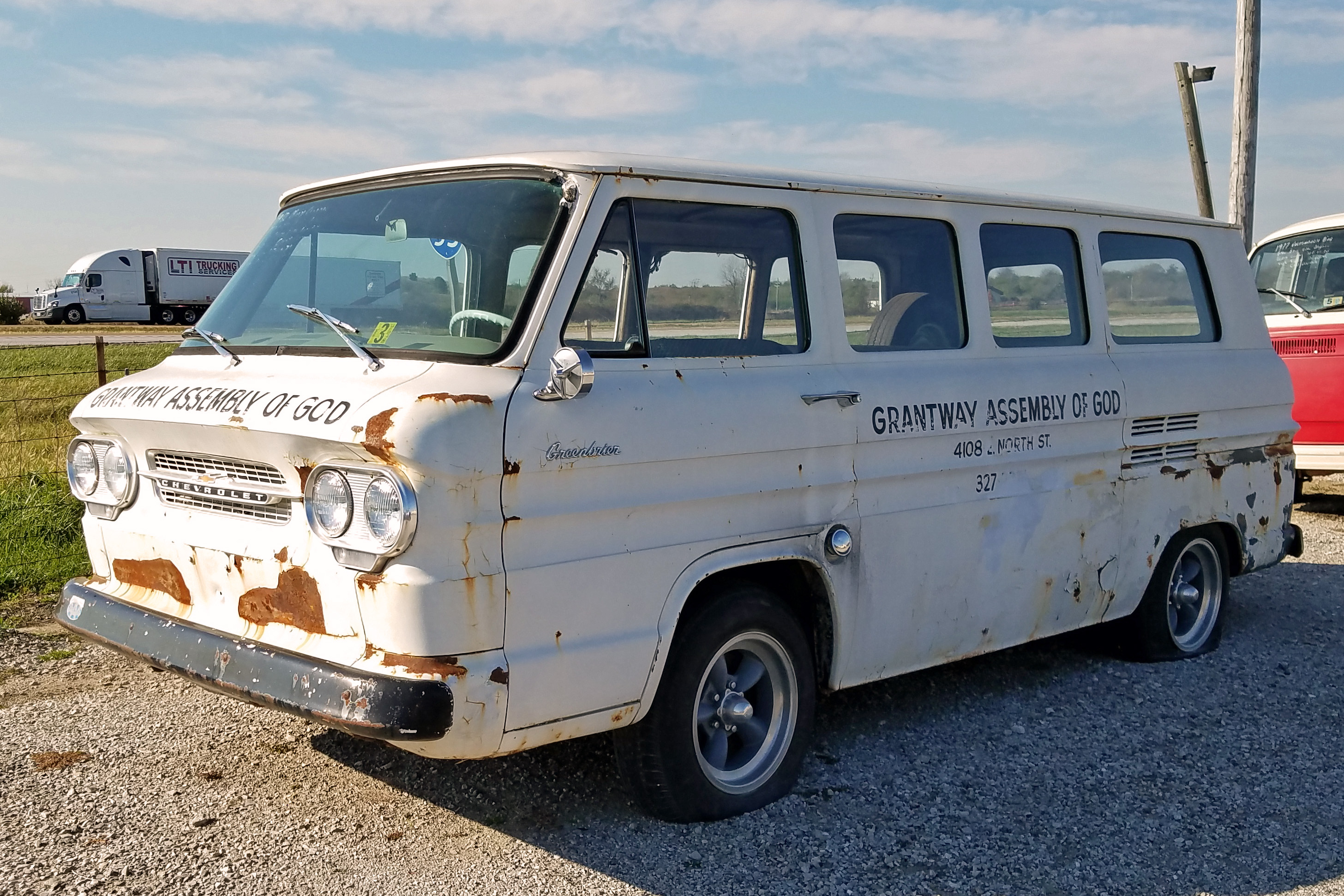
1962 Chevrolet Corvair Greenbrier

Two different bodies were available in the 95 series: the van and the truck. The base version was the panel van (Corvan) with no side or rear windows. The van was named Greenbrier and was available with trim and paint options similar to the passenger car versions of the Corvair. The Greenbrier version usually had windows all around and six doors, However, an option offered a total of eight doors that included rear center opening double doors on both sides of the vehicle. The Greenbrier seated nine people with the available third-row seat. The 95s and cars had an optional heater using gasoline from the vehicle's tank.

Chevrolet made camper kits as a dealer-installed package for the Greenbrier vans. These included a bed that covered the rear-mounted engine as well as various kitchen, cabinet, and table layouts that changed by model year. An example was the 1961 kit for $485.

A Corvair 95 truck was available as a "Loadside" or "Rampside". The Loadside was a pickup truck with a standard tailgate for accessing the cargo bed from the rear over the engine compartment. The bed included a metal panel that could be unscrewed to access the engine for major service. The cargo bay area between the engine compartment and the rear of the cab could be covered with a deck to form a level surface with the top of the engine compartment. The Loadside was produced during two model years with 2,844 made in 1961 and 369 built in 1962. The Rampside had a ramp hinged at the bottom of the cargo bay area on the right side of the vehicle. Rubber trim on the edge helped avoid scratching the paint when the ramp was lowered for loading and unloading cargo. These were used by the Bell Telephone Company because loading and unloading of cable drums was eased by the side ramp.

=== Competition ===
Originally, the Corvair 95 line was meant to compete with the popular Volkswagen Type 2 on account of its rear engined air-cooled design, similar to how the standard Corvair competed with the Volkswagen Beetle.

Ford had introduced the Econoline van line a year prior to the release of the Corvair 95, and Chrysler released the Dodge A100 for 1964. All of these vans were competing in the compact van segment. They also all had variants with integrated pickup truck beds, thus creating the 'van truck' segment, although the Corvairs 'Rampside' bed was exclusive to it. The forward engine design allowed a flat floor with lower deck in the rear of the vehicle for loading and unloading cargo.

The rear engine design of the Corvair gave better interior space for front seat passengers due to the powertrain being unintrusive. The Ford and the Dodge however were able to better utilize existing parts due to their more conventional designs, thereby making them cheaper to produce. The rear engine also gave the Corvair 95s a higher rear load floor compared to its competition.

== Discontinuation ==
General Motors stopped producing the Rampside and panel van versions of the Corvair in 1964, and the Greenbrier was the only remaining Corvair 95 for 1965. The Greenbrier was retained mainly for fleet orders, with 1,528 being built for its final year. Following the updated version of the standard Corvair, Chevrolet would abandon rear-engined vans in favor of conventional forward-control, front mounted, water-cooled engines with the Chevy Van/Sportvan for 1964. The truck variant would be ultimately be replaced in the lineup by the Chevrolet El Camino.

Although the Corvair 95s were unsuccessful in the marketplace, passenger vans continued to evolve through full-sized vans. The similarly sized 7–8 passenger minivan would become a booming vehicle segment by the 1980s as an alternative to station wagons.

The Greenbrier name was used again as a model name for mid-trim level Chevelle conventional station wagon from 1969 until 1972.
