= Chevrolet El Camino =

Coupe utility

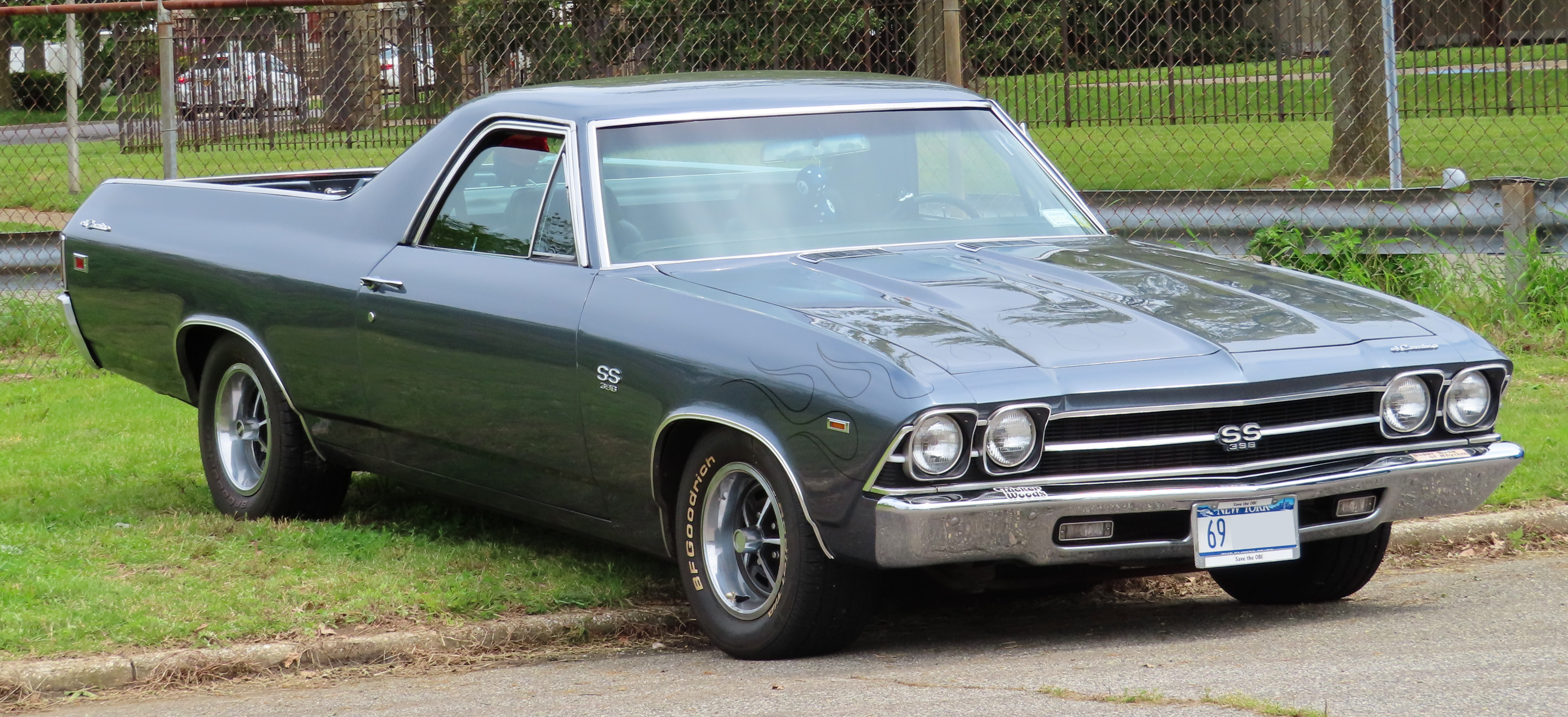
- 1969 El Camino SS

Overview
- Manufacturer: Chevrolet (General Motors)
- Model years: 1959–1960; 1964–1987

Body and chassis
- Class: Coupé utility Muscle car
- Layout: Front engine, rear-wheel drive

The Chevrolet El Camino is a coupé utility vehicle that was produced by Chevrolet in 1959 and 1960, and from 1964 to 1987. Unlike a standard pickup truck, the El Camino was adapted from the standard two-door Chevrolet station wagon platform and integrated the cab and cargo bed into the body.

Introduced in the 1959 model year in response to the success of the Ford Ranchero coupé utility, its first run, based on the Biscayne's B-body, lasted only two years. Production resumed for the 1964–1977 model years based on the Chevelle platform, and continued for the 1978–1987 model years based on the GM G-body platform.

Although based on corresponding General Motors car lines, the vehicle is classified in the United States as a pickup. GMC's badge engineered El Camino variant, the Sprint, was introduced for the 1971 model year. Renamed Caballero in 1978, it was also produced through the 1987 model year.

== Background ==
The concept of a two-door vehicle based on a passenger car chassis with a tray at the rear began in the United States in the 1920s with the roadster utility (also called "roadster pickup" or "light delivery") models.

Ford Australia was the first company to produce a coupé utility as a result of a 1932 letter from the wife of a farmer in Victoria, Australia, asking for "a vehicle to go to church in on a Sunday and which can carry our pigs to market on Mondays". Ford designer Lew Bandt developed a suitable solution, and the first coupé utility model was released in 1934. Bandt went on to manage Ford's Advanced Design Department, being responsible for the body engineering of the mid-1960s to early-1970s XP, XT, XW, and XA series Ford Falcon utilities. General Motors’ Australian subsidiary Holden also produced a Chevrolet coupé utility in 1935, and Studebaker produced the Coupé Express from 1937 to 1939. The body style did not reappear on the American market until the release of the 1957 Ford Ranchero.

Both the coupé utility and the similar open-topped roadster utility continued in production, but the improving economy of the mid- to late-1930s and the desire for improved comfort saw coupé utility sales climb at the expense of the roadster utility until, by 1939, the latter was all but a fading memory.

In 1957, Ford introduced the Ranchero, and established a new market segment in the U.S. of an automobile platform based coupé utility. In 1959, Chevrolet responded with the El Camino to compete with Ford's full-sized Ranchero. The original El Camino and Ranchero would compete directly only in the 1959 model year.

== First generation (1959–1960) ==
First generation
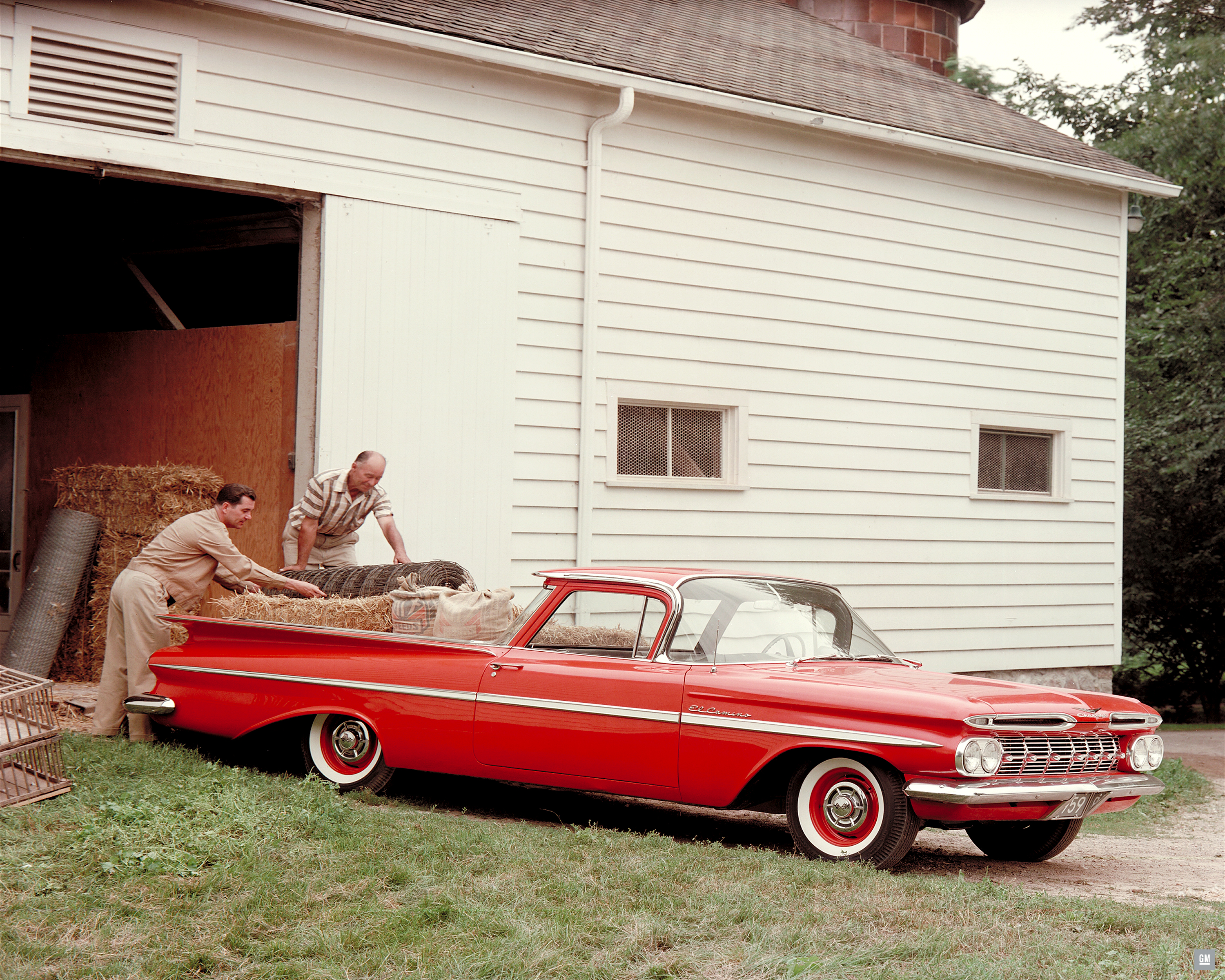
- 1959 El Camino

Overview
- Model years: 1959–1960
- Assembly: Baltimore, Maryland, United States (Baltimore Assembly); Flint, Michigan, United States, (Flint Assembly); Janesville, Wisconsin, United States (Janesville Assembly); Lakewood, Georgia, United States (Lakewood Assembly); Norwood, Ohio, United States (Norwood Assembly); St. Louis, Missouri, United States, (St. Louis Assembly); Van Nuys, California, United States (Van Nuys Assembly)

Body and chassis
- Platform: GM B platform
- Related: Chevrolet Biscayne; Chevrolet Bel Air; Chevrolet Impala; Chevrolet Brookwood; Chevrolet Parkwood; Chevrolet Kingswood; Chevrolet Nomad

Powertrain
- Engine: 235 cu in (3.9 L) I6; 283 cu in (4.6 L) V8; 348 cu in (5.7 L) V8
- Transmission: 3-speed manual 4-speed manual 2-speed Powerglide automatic

Dimensions
- Wheelbase: 119 in (3,023 mm)
- Length: 210.9 in (5,357 mm)

=== 1959 ===
The El Camino was introduced for the 1959 model year two years after the Ford Ranchero. According to Chevrolet stylist Chuck Jordan, GM Harley Earl had suggested a coupé pickup in 1952.

Like the Ranchero, it was based on an existing and modified platform, the new-for-1959 Brookwood two-door station wagon, itself based on the redesigned full-sized Chevrolet of that year. Highly stylized, it initially sold 50% more briskly than the more conservative Ranchero, some 22,000 to 14,000.

Unlike the Brookwood wagon and a sedan delivery variant, the El Camino was available with any full-sized Chevrolet drivetrain. It came in a single trim level, its exterior using the mid-level Bel-Air's trim, and the interior of the low-end Biscayne. Its chassis featured Chevrolet's "Safety-Girder" X-frame design and a full-coil suspension, both introduced in the 1958 model year. The 119 in (3,000 mm) wheel-base was 1.5 inches (38 mm) longer, and overall length for all 1959 Chevrolets was up to 210.9 in (5,360 mm). The El Camino's payload rating ranged from 650–1,150 lb (290–520 kg), with gross vehicle weights ranging from 4,400–4,900 lb (2,000–2,200 kg) depending on powertrain and suspension. The somewhat soft passenger car suspension of the base model left the vehicle level without a load, in contrast the Ranchero, where standard 1100-pound rated heavy duty rear springs gave it a distinct rake when empty. The quirky Level Air suspension option, in its second and final year, was listed as available, but was almost never seen on any Chevrolet model, much less an El Camino. The 1959 El Camino was promoted as the first Chevrolet pickup built with a steel bed floor instead of wood. The floor was a corrugated sheetmetal insert, secured with 26 recessed bolts. Concealed beneath it was the floor pan from the Brookwood two-door wagon, complete with foot wells. Box capacity was almost 33 cubic feet (0.93 m^{3}).

Among the performance engines offered were a 283-cid Turbo-Fire V8 with two- or four-barrel carburetion, several Turbo-Thrust 348-cid V8s with four-barrel or triple two-barrel carburetors producing 335 bhp (250 kW; 340 PS), and 250- and 290-bhp 283-cube Ramjet Fuel Injection V8s.

Hot Rod magazine conducted a test of an El Camino equipped with the hottest powertrain combination available in early 1959—a 315 bhp (235 kW; 319 PS), triple-carb, solid-lifter 348 V8 mated to a four-speed. Staff testers clocked 0-60 mph times of around seven seconds, estimated top speed at 130 mph (210 km/h), and predicted 14-second/100-mph quarter-mile performance with a rear-axle ratio suitable for drag racing installed.

A total of 22,246 El Caminos were produced for 1959. That bested the count of 21,706 first-year Rancheros made in 1957 and the 14,169 Ford sedan pickups built in direct competition for the 1959 model year.

=== 1960 ===
The similar but less flamboyant 1960 model started at $2366 for the six-cylinder model; another $107 for a V8 with the two-barrel 283. At first glance, the exterior once again had a Bel Air look, with that series' bright-metal "jet" appliqué and narrow trailing molding used to accent the rear quarters. Inside, Biscayne/Brookwood appointments also persisted. The seat was now covered in striped-pattern cloth with vinyl facings. Available interior trim shades were once again gray, blue, and green. Floor coverings were in medium-tone vinyl. Mid-1959 powertrain availability was carried over with minimal changes for 1960: The base 283-cid V8 was detuned a bit for fuel economy and was now rated at 170 bhp (127 kW; 172 PS), and the fuel-injected engines were officially gone.

Orders plummeted by a third, to just 14,163, at which point Chevrolet discontinued the model; meanwhile, Ford moved 21,027 Rancheros, which were now based on the brand-new Falcon compact. The pioneering American sedan pickups just did not connect with enough car-buying Americans. Perhaps these early "crossovers" didn't carry enough passengers; in a time when baby-boomer families dominated the market, three across was the best they could offer. Cargo volume was meager compared with pickup trucks. The low-level trim and marketing efforts focused almost exclusively on commercial customers may have inhibited sales, as well.

Between the discontinuation of the first generation and the introduction of the second, the Chevrolet Greenbrier, based on the Corvair platform, replaced the El Camino as Chevrolet’s car-based pickup.

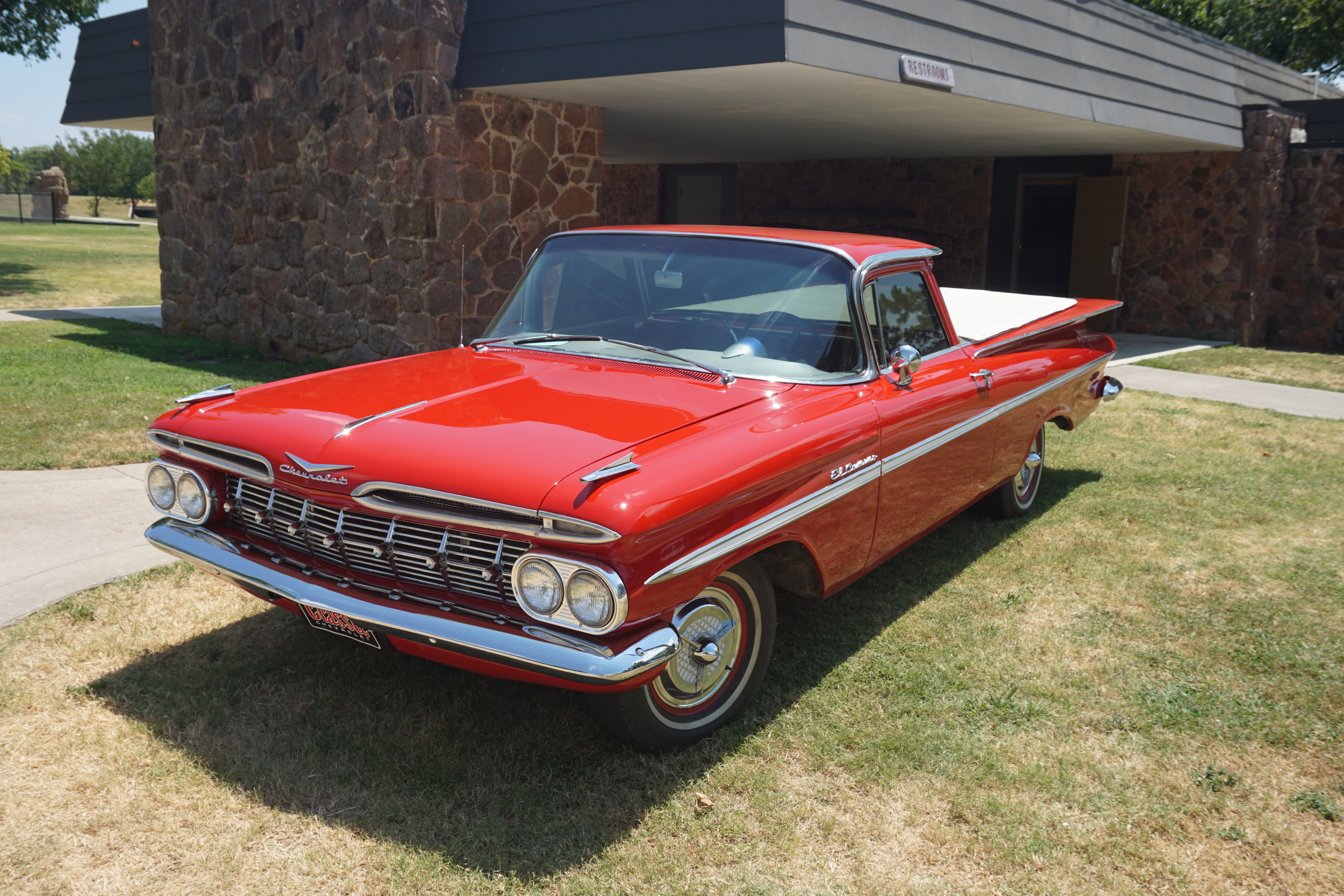
1959 El Camino

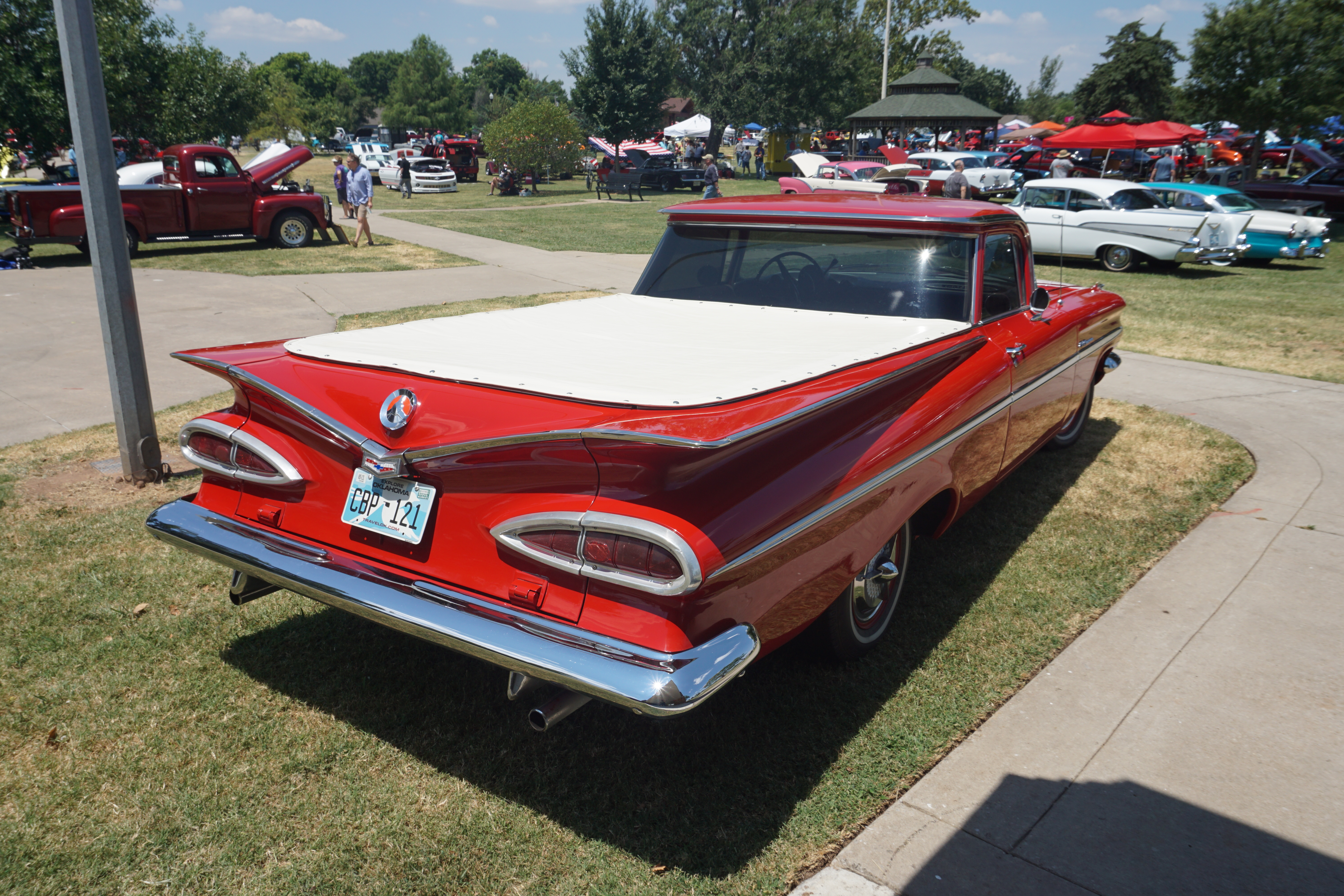
1959 El Camino

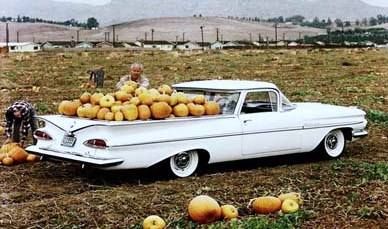
1959 El Camino

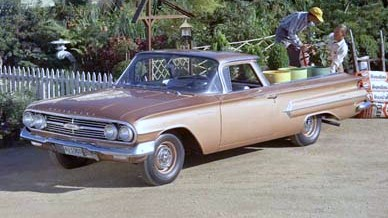
1960 El Camino

Production numbers
Model year	Total production
1959	22,246
1960	14,163

== Second generation (1964–1967) ==
Second generation
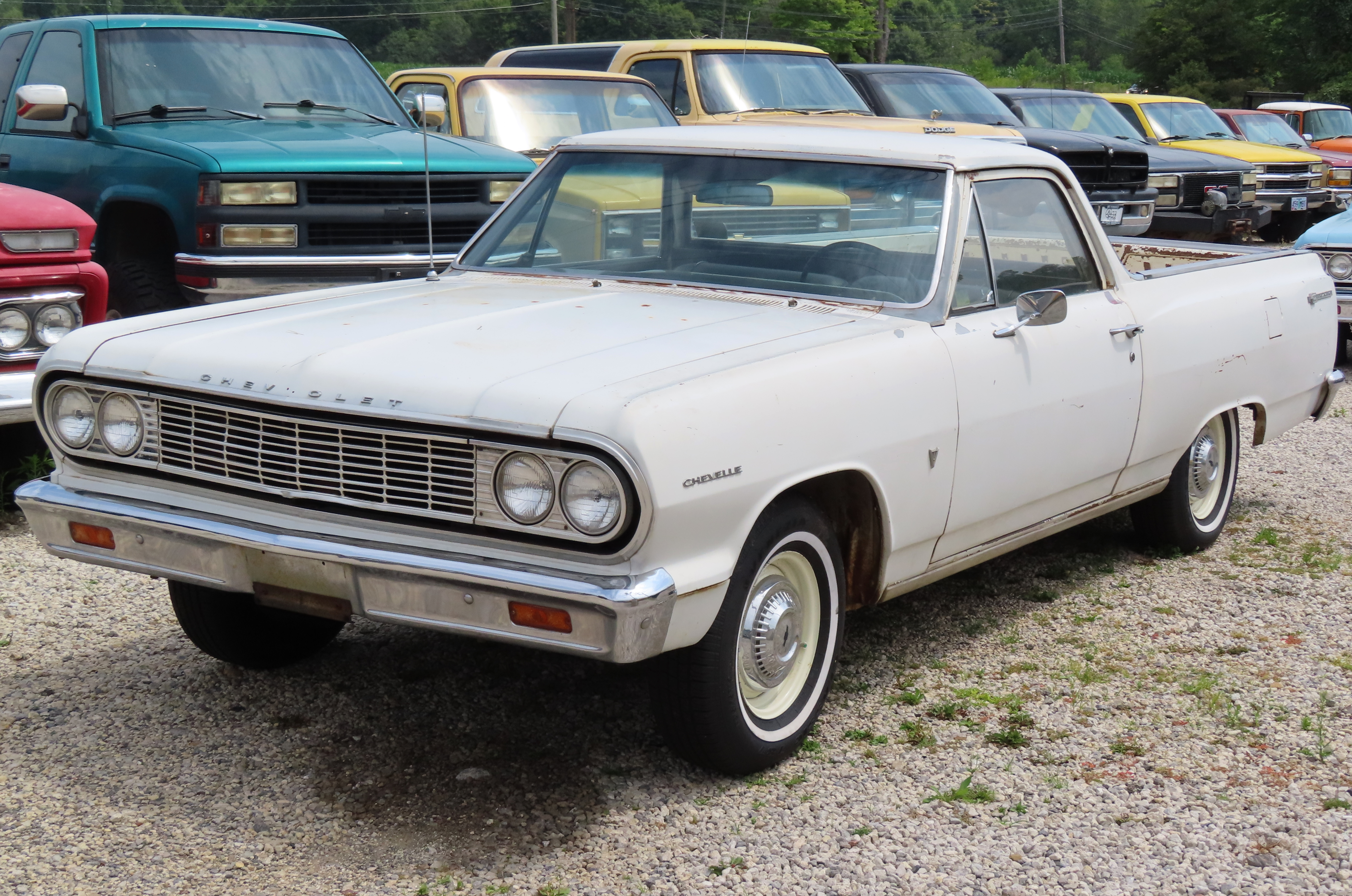
- 1964 Chevelle El Camino

Overview
- Model years: 1964–1967
- Assembly: Baltimore, Maryland (Baltimore Assembly); Fremont, California (Fremont Assembly); Lakewood Heights, Atlanta, Georgia (Lakewood Assembly); Leeds, Kansas City, Missouri (Leeds Assembly); Van Nuys, California (Van Nuys Assembly)

Body and chassis
- Platform: A-body
- Related: Chevrolet Chevelle

Powertrain
- Engine: 194 cu in (3.2 L) I6; 230 cu in (3.8 L) I6; 250 cu in (4.1 L) I6; 283 cu in (4.6 L) Small-Block V8; 327 cu in (5.4 L) Small-Block V8; 396 cu in (6.5 L) Big-Block V8
- Transmission: 3-speed manual 4-speed manual 2-speed Powerglide automatic

Dimensions
- Wheelbase: 115 in (2,921 mm)

Chevrolet reintroduced the El Camino four years later based on the mid-size Chevrolet Chevelle. The 1964 model was similar to the Chevelle two-door wagon forward of the B-pillars and carried both "Chevelle" and "El Camino" badges, but Chevrolet marketed the vehicle as a utility model and the Chevelle's most powerful engines were not available. Initial engine offerings included six-cylinder engines of 194 and 230 cubic inches with horsepower ratings of 120 and 155 hp (89 and 116 kW), respectively. The standard V8 was a 283 cubic-inch Chevrolet small block with two-barrel carburetor and 195 hp (145 kW) with optional engines including a 220 hp (164 kW) 283 with four-barrel carburetor and dual exhausts. Added to the El Camino's option list during the course of the 1964 model year were two versions of the 327 cubic-inch small block V8 rated at 250 and 300 hp (186 and 224 kW)—the latter featuring a higher compression ratio of 10.5:1, larger four-barrel carburetor and dual exhausts. El Caminos also featured Air shocks in the rear, as well as fully boxed frames. The shocks were continued over all generations, the frames only thru 1967.

=== 1965 ===
The 1965 El Camino received the same facelift as the 1965 Chevelle, with a more pronounced V-shaped front end, and a higher performance L79 version of the 327 engine rated at 350 hp (261 kW) that was also available in Chevelles. Most of the other engines were carried over from 1964, including the 194 and 230 cubic-inch Turbo Thrift sixes, the 195 hp (145 kW) 283 cubic-inch Turbo-Fire V8 and 327 cubic-inch Turbo-Fire V8s of 250 and 300 hp (186 and 224 kW).

=== 1966 ===
In 1966, GM added a 396 cu in (6.5 L) V8 engine to the lineup rated from 325 to 375 hp (280 kW). The 1965 327 would run low 15s in the 1/4 mile (at some 90 mph), while 1966 to 1969 models were easily into the mid- to upper-14s. New sheetmetal highlighted the 1966 El Camino, identical to the Chevelle. A new instrument panel with horizontal sweep speedometer was featured. Inside, the standard version featured a bench seat interior and rubber floor mat from the low-line Chevelle 300 series, while the Custom used a more upscale interior from the Chevelle Malibu with plusher cloth-and-vinyl or all-vinyl bench seats and deep twist carpeting. A tachometer was optional.

=== 1967 ===
The 1967 El Camino followed the Chevelle's styling facelift with a new grille, front bumper, and trim. Air shocks remained standard equipment on the El Camino, allowing the driver to compensate for a load. The 1967 model year also brought the collapsible steering column and options of disc brakes and Turbo Hydramatic 400 3-speed automatic transmission. It was the second year the 396 (L35, L34, and L78) could be had in the El Camino (both 13480 300 Deluxe base and 13680 Malibu series). Since the L35 396/325 hp engine was the base for the SS396 series, the number of L35 engines reported sold by Chevrolet in 1967 (2,565) were sold in one of the two El Camino series, which were the only other series the engine could be ordered in. Since the L34 (350 hp (261 kW)) & L78 (375 hp (280 kW)) were available in either El Camino series as well as the two SS396 body styles, there is no way of knowing how many of these optional engines went to which body style. Chevrolet does report 17,176 L34 and 612 L78 engine options were sold in 1967 Chevelles, but there is no breakdown of body styles. The TH400 3-speed automatic was now available as an option (RPO M40) with the 396 engine in both the SS396 series and the 396-equipped El Caminos. The 3-speed manual transmission remained the standard transmission with a heavy duty (RPO M13) also available along with the 2-speed Powerglide and either M20 wide ratio or M21 close ratio 4-speed transmissions. Although there was no actual factory El Camino Super Sport until 1968, many owners have "cloned" '67 SS396s using 1967 Chevelle SS396 badges and trim.

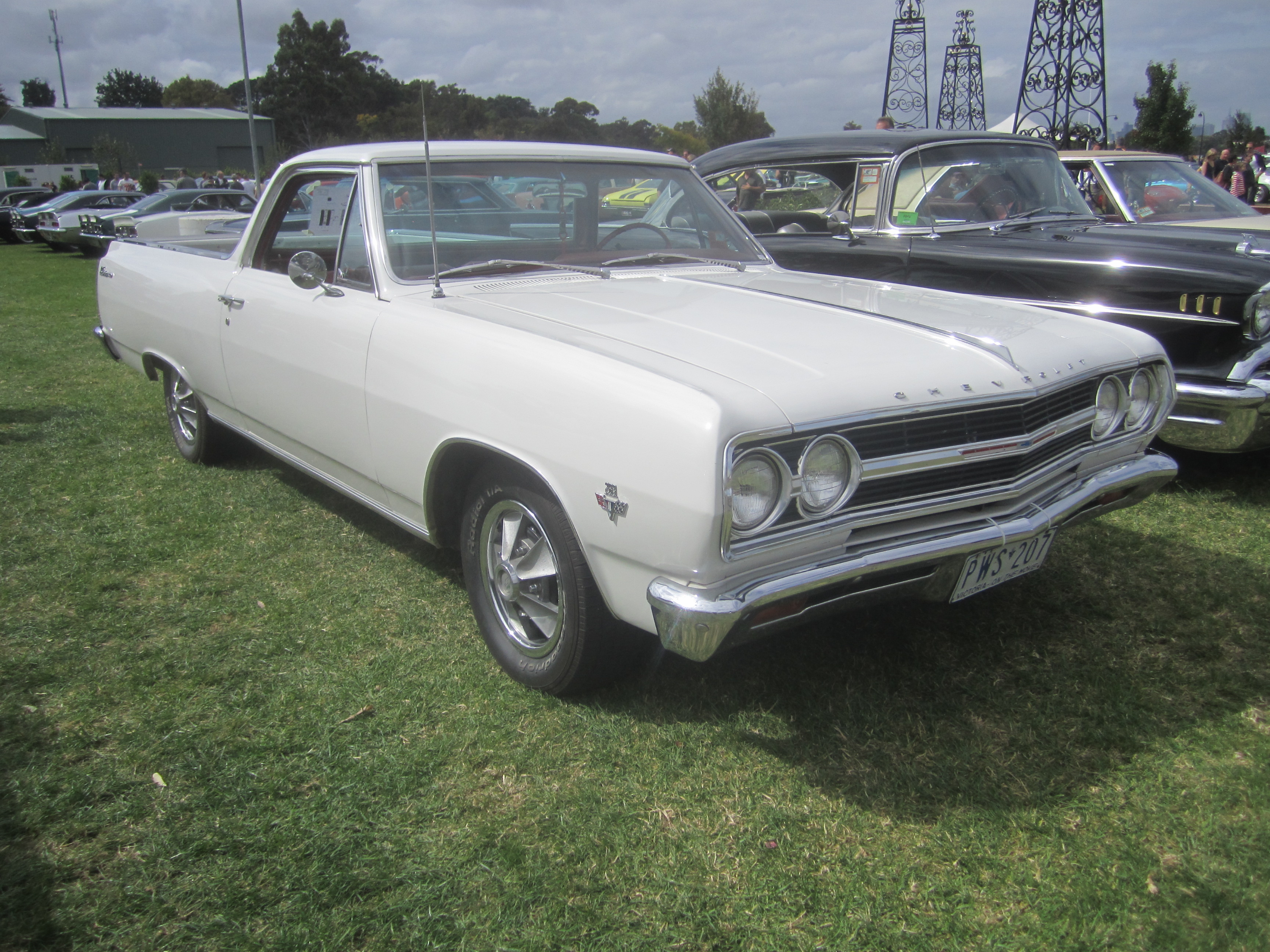
1965 Chevrolet Chevelle El Camino

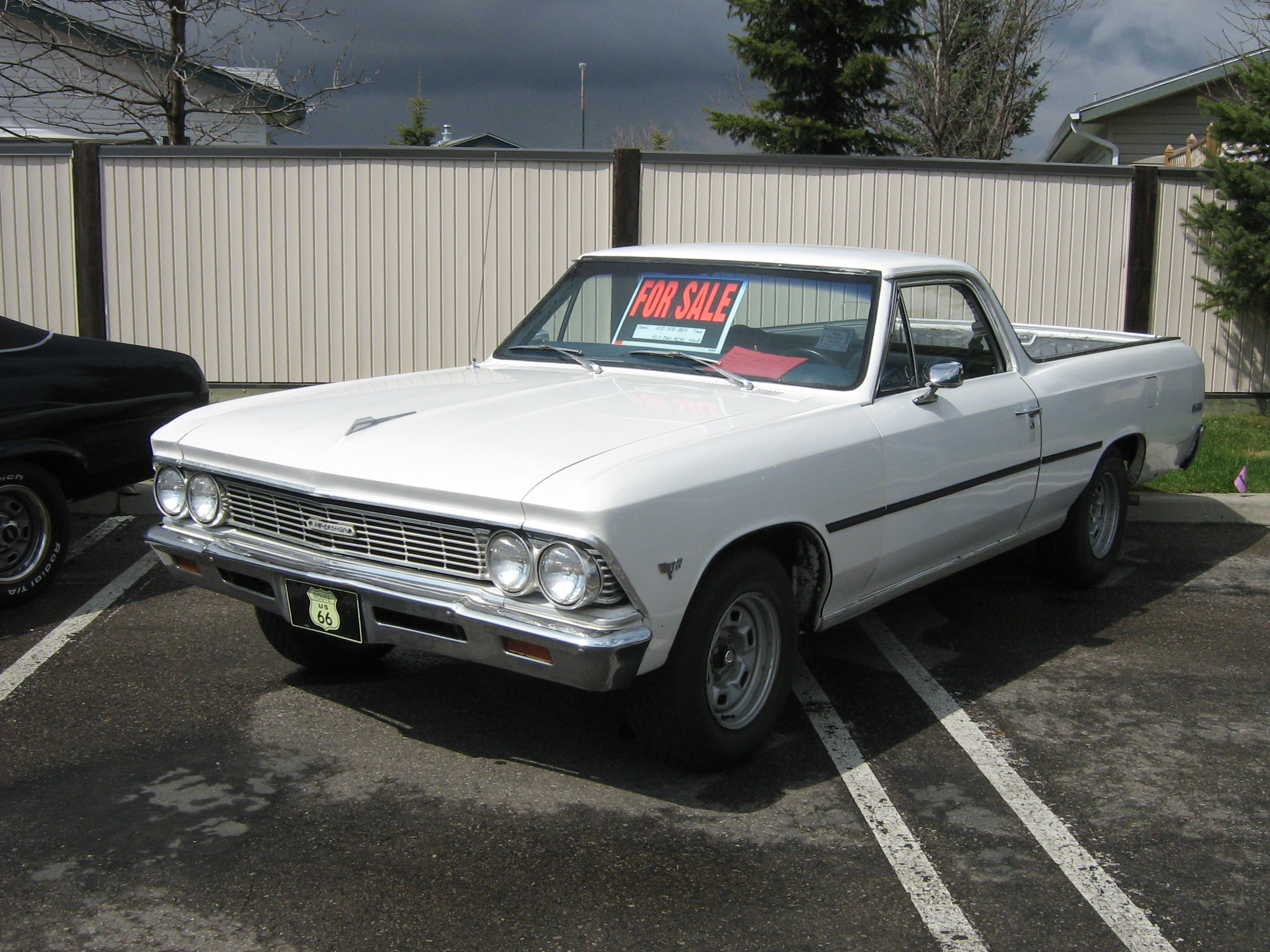
1966 El Camino
(with non-standard wheels)

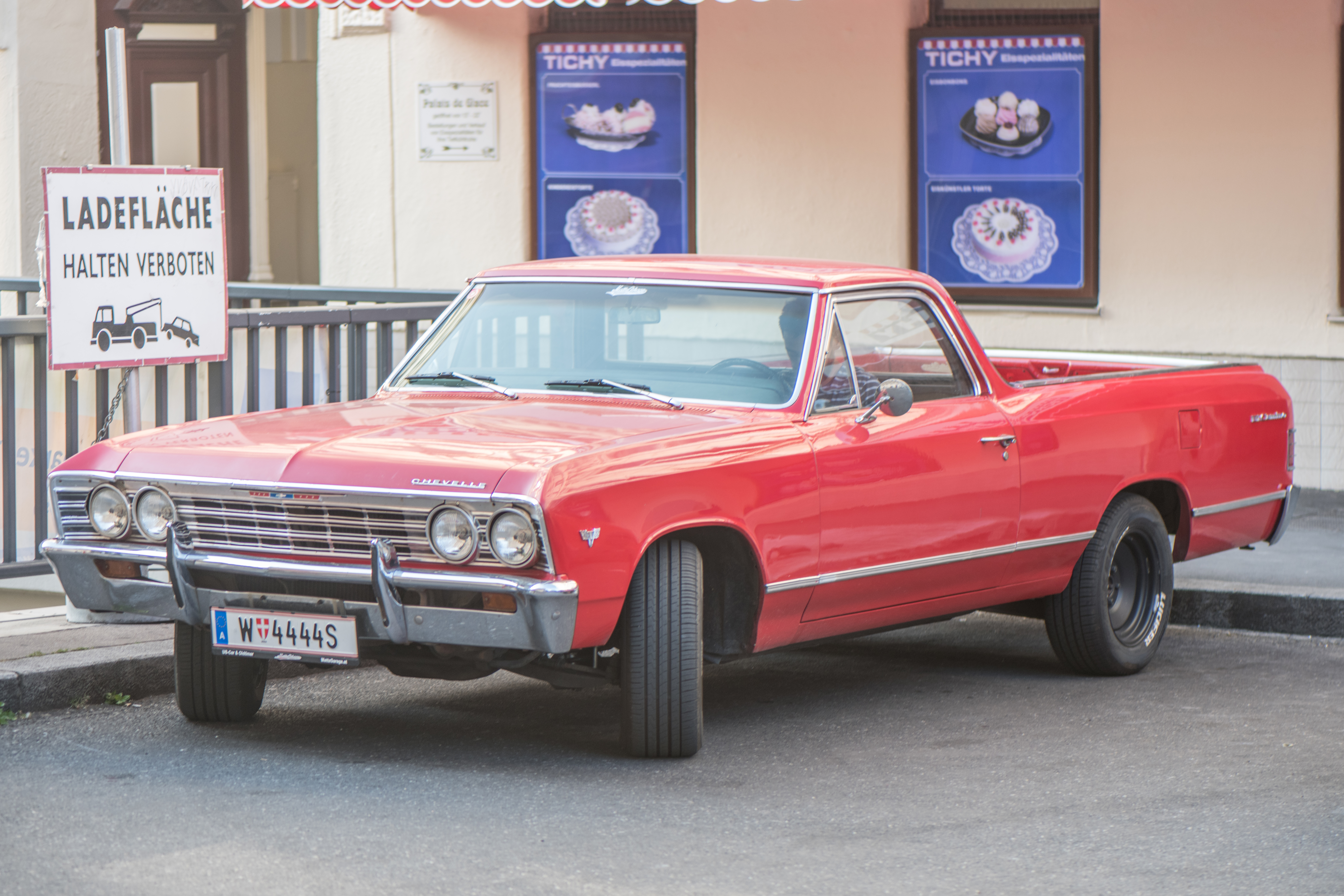
1967 El Camino

Production numbers
Model year	Total production
1964	32,548
1965	34,724
1966	35,119
1967	34,830

== Third generation (1968–1972) ==
Third generation
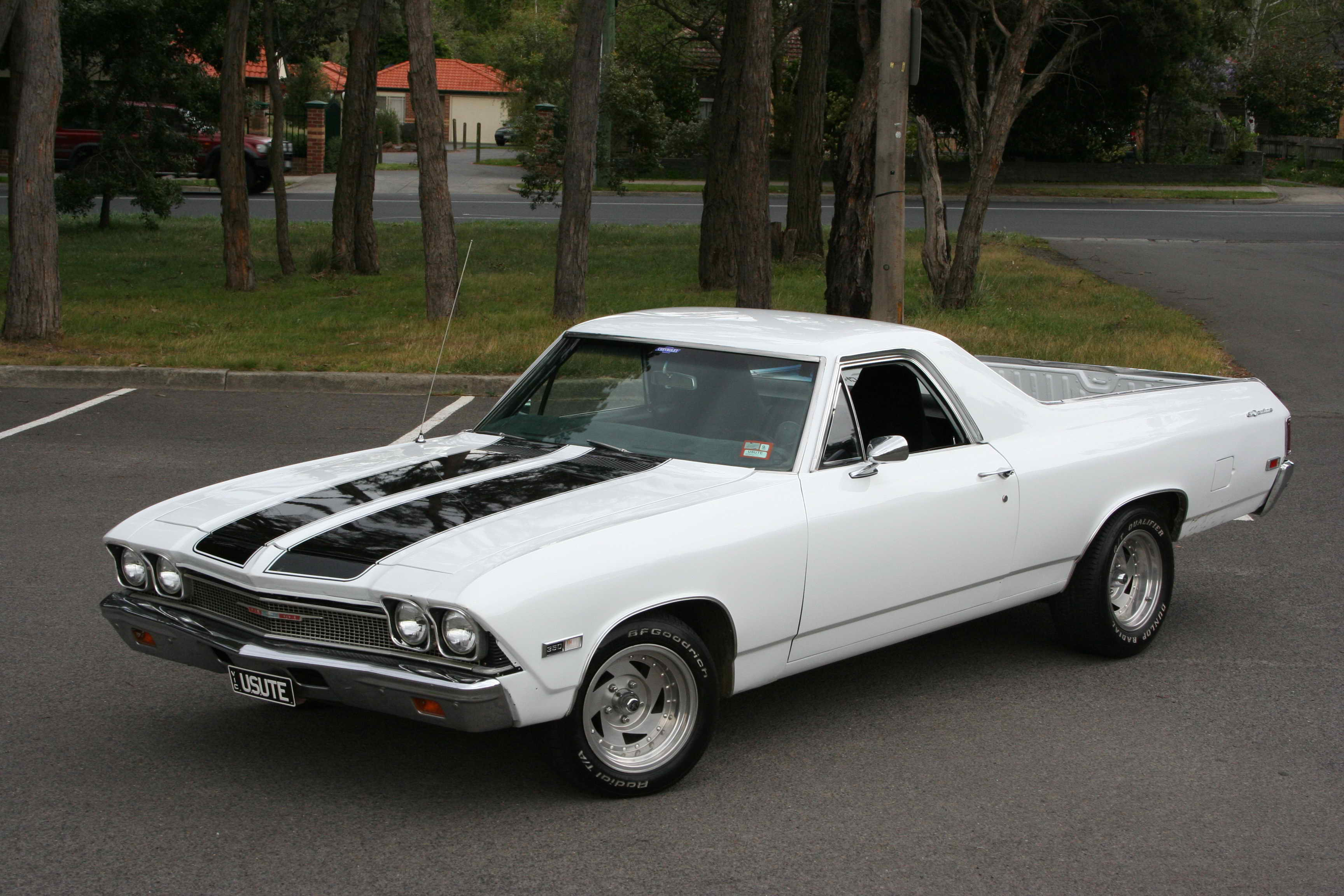
- 1968 El Camino

Overview
- Model years: 1968–1972
- Assembly: Baltimore, Maryland, United States, (Baltimore Assembly); Fremont, California, United States, (Fremont Assembly); Leeds, Kansas City, Missouri, United States, (Leeds Assembly); Van Nuys, California, United States, (Van Nuys Assembly)

Body and chassis
- Platform: A-body
- Related: Chevrolet Chevelle; GMC Sprint

Powertrain
- Engine: 230 cu in (3.8 L) I6; 250 cu in (4.1 L) I6; 307 cu in (5.0 L) V8; 327 cu in (5.4 L) V8; 350 cu in (5.7 L) V8; 396 cu in (6.5 L) V8; 454 cu in (7.4 L) V8
- Transmission: 3-speed manual 4-speed manual 2-speed Powerglide auto. 3-speed Turbo-Hydramatic auto

Dimensions
- Wheelbase: 116 in (2,946 mm)

=== 1968–1969 ===
Chevrolet introduced a longer El Camino in 1968, based on the Chevelle station wagon/four-door sedan wheelbase (116 in (2,946 mm), overall length: 208 in (5,283 mm)); it also shared Chevelle Malibu exterior and interior trims. The interior was revamped including cloth and vinyl or all-vinyl bench seats and deep twist carpeting. All-vinyl Strato bucket seats and center console were an $111 option. Power front disc brakes and Positraction were optional. A new, high-performance Super Sport SS396 version was launched. The Turbo-Jet 396 was offered in 325 bhp (242 kW) or 350 bhp (260 kW) versions. Returning to the official options list for the first time since late 1966 was the 375 bhp (280 kW) L78. It had solid lifters, big-port heads, and an 800 cfm Holley four-barrel on a low-rise aluminum manifold. A three-speed manual was standard with all engines, and a four-speed or automatic was optional. In 1968, the SS was a separate model (the "SS-396").

The 1969 models showed only minor changes, led by more-rounded front-end styling. A single chrome bar connected quad headlights, and a slotted bumper held the parking lights. New round instrument pods replaced the former linear layout. For the first time, the Chevrolet 350 V8 was used in an El Camino. The Super Sport group included a 265 or 325 hp (198 or 242 kW) 396-cubic-inch V8 beneath a double-domed hood, along with a black-out grille displaying an SS emblem. More potent editions of the 396 engine, developing 350 or 375 hp (261 or 280 kW) also made the options list. Options included power windows and locks. Curiously, back-up lights moved from the rear bumper to the tailgate, where they were ineffective when the gate was down.

=== 1970 ===
The 1970 models received sheet metal revisions that gave the bodies a more squared-up stance, and interiors were also redesigned. The new SS396, which actually displaced 402 cu in (6.6 L) (although all emblems read 396) was available. Chevrolet's largest and most-powerful engine of the time was also put into a select few El Caminos. The LS6 454 CID engine, rated at 450 hp (336 kW) and 500 lb⋅ft (678 N⋅m) of torque, gave the El Camino 1/4-mile times in the upper 13-second range at around 106 mph (171 km/h).

=== 1971–1972 ===
The 1971 El Camino got fresh front-end styling (again shared with the Chevelle) that included large Power-Beam single-unit headlights, a reworked grille and bumper, and integral park/signal/marker lights. For 1971, mandated lower-octane unleaded fuel necessitated a reduction in engine compression, and GM's A.I.R. system, a "smog pump", was added to control tailpipe emissions. Power and performance were reduced. Engine offerings for 1971 included the 250-6, small-block V8s of 307 and 350 cubic inches; and big block V8s of 402 and 454-cubic-inch displacements. Horsepower ratings of those engines for 1971 ranged from 145 for the six to 365 for the RPO LS5 454 – all in gross figures. The LS6 454 V8 was gone forever. A rebadged El Camino, the GMC Sprint, debuted in 1971. It shared the same engine and transmission offerings as its Chevrolet counterpart.

The 1972 El Caminos wore single-unit parking and side marker lights on their front fenders, outside of a revised twin-bar grille, but little changed. For 1972, horsepower measurements were switched to the "net" figures as installed in a vehicle with all accessories and emission controls hooked up. Engine offerings included the 110 hp (82 kW) 250-6, a 307 V8, a 175 hp (130 kW) 350-cubic-inch V8, and big block V8s of 402 and 454 cubic-inch displacements. The 402-cubic-inch (still known as a 396) produced 240 hp (179 kW); the 454 managed to put out 270 hp (201 kW) under the net rating system. Super Sport equipment could now be ordered with any V8 engine, including the base 307-cubic-inch version. All 1972 El Caminos with the 454 ci engine have a "W" as the fifth digit in the VIN, and the 454 was only available with Super Sport trim.

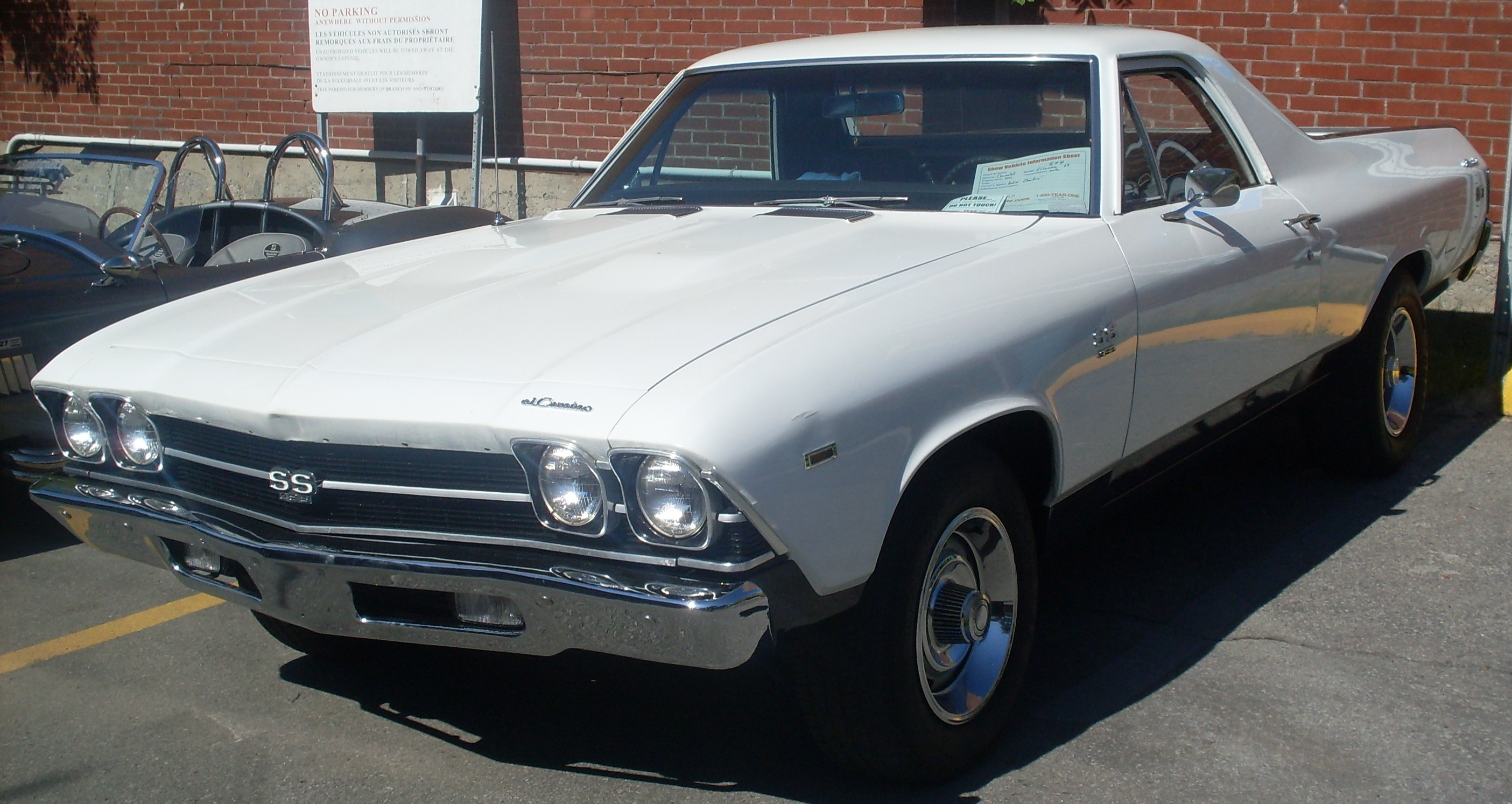
1969 El Camino

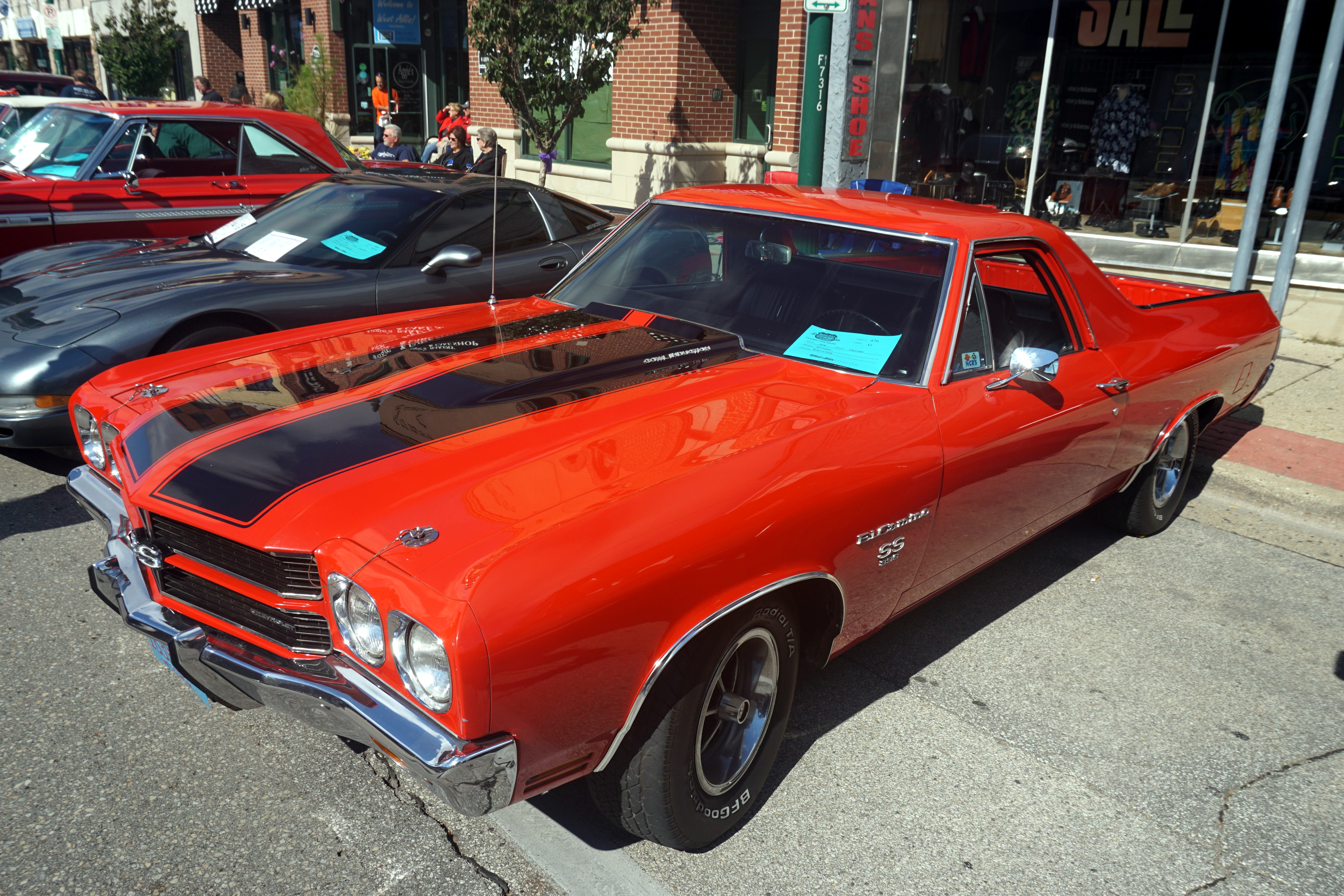
1970 El Camino

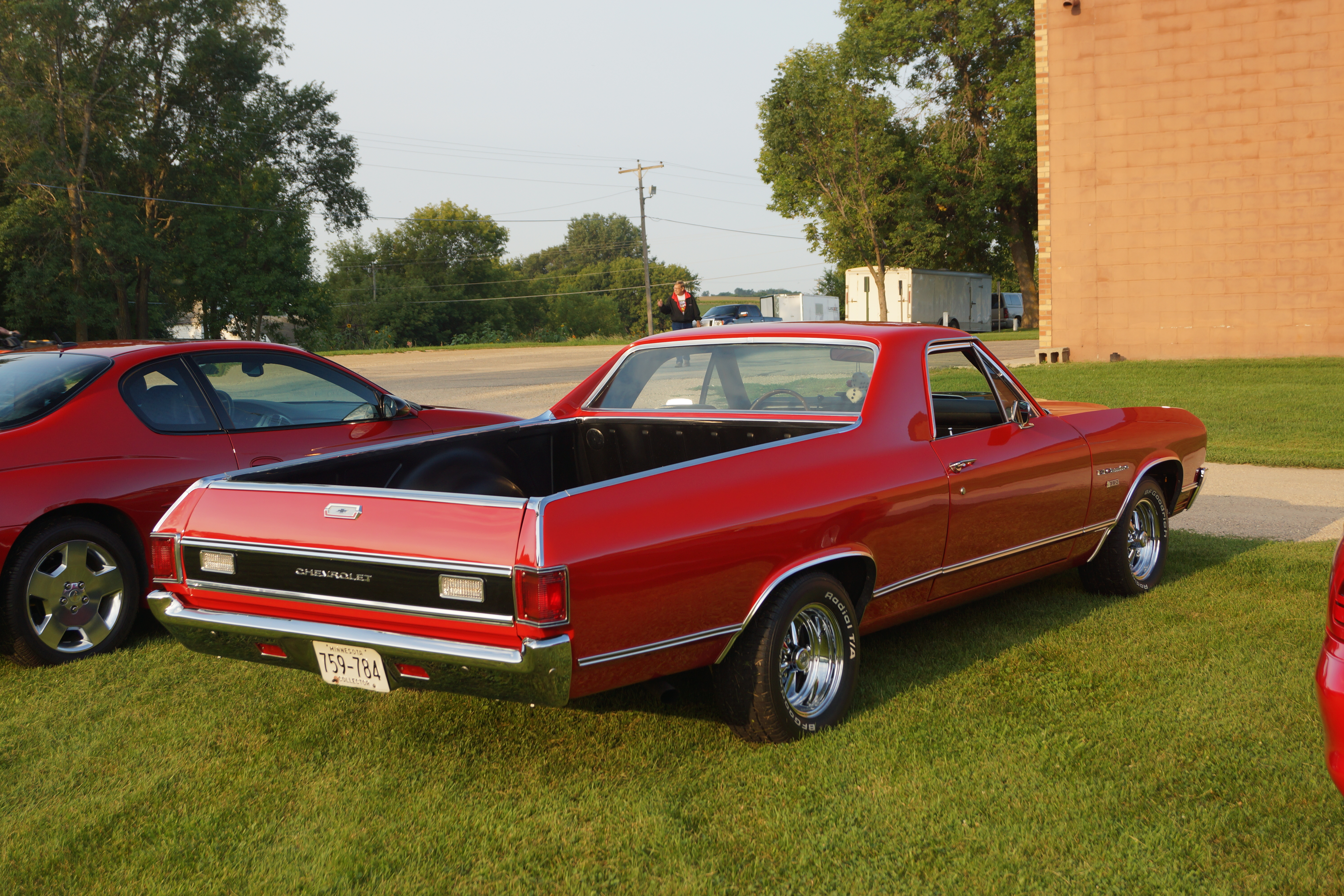
1970 El Camino (rear)

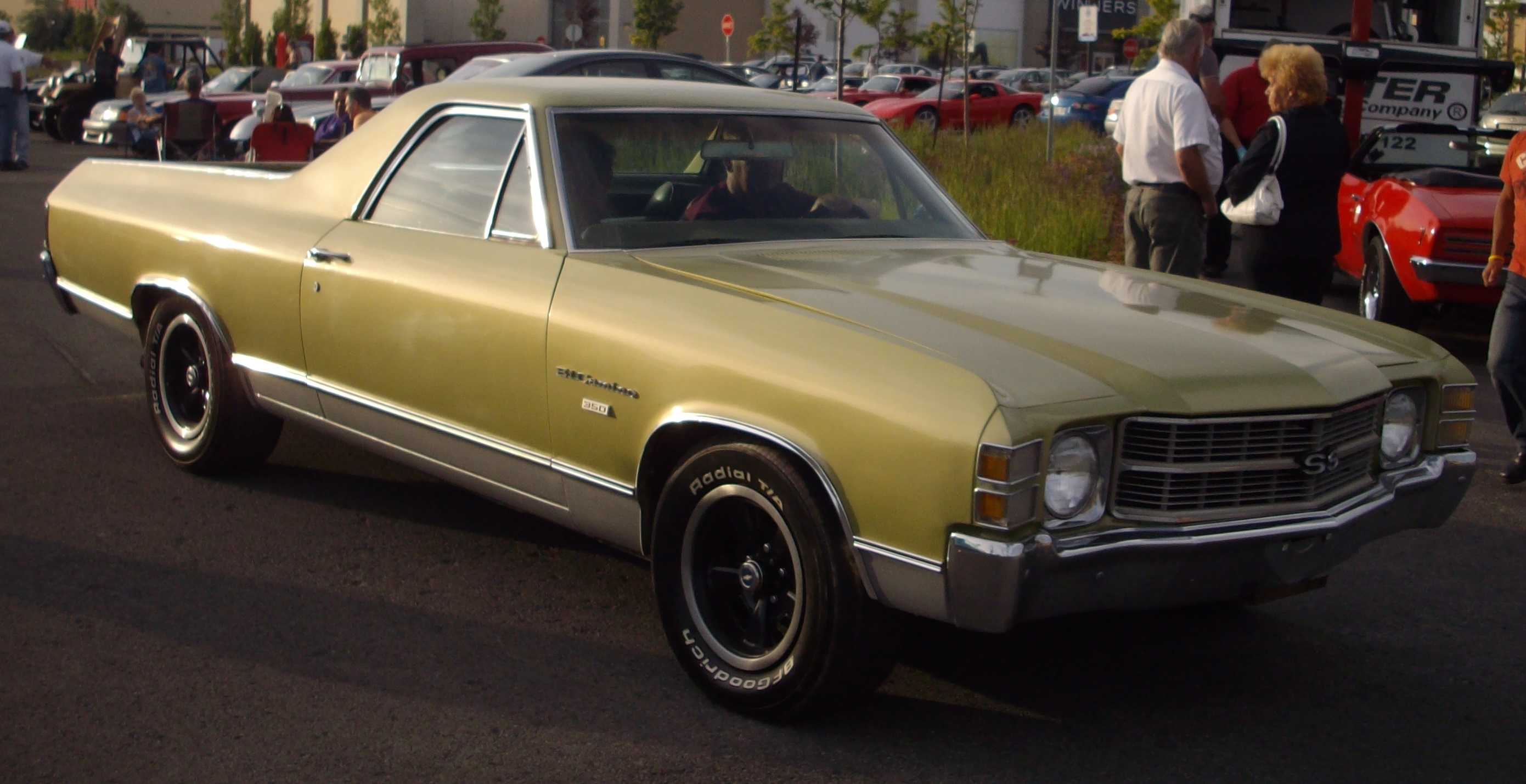
1971 El Camino

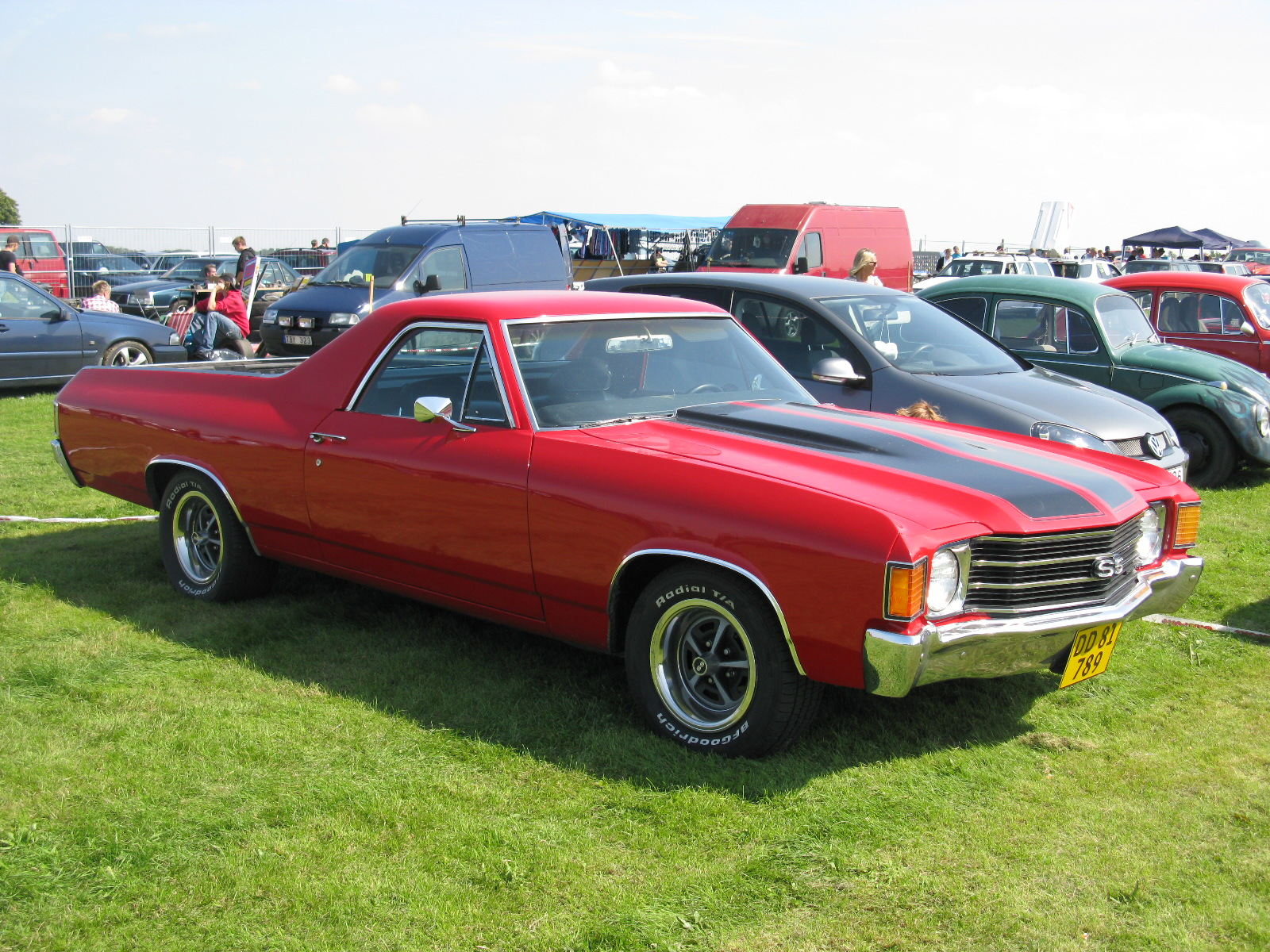
1972 El Camino

Production numbers
Model year	Total production
1968	41,791
1969	48,385
1970	47,707
1971	41,606
1972	57,147

== Fourth generation (1973–1977) ==
Fourth generation
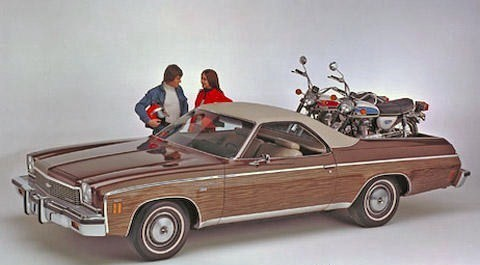
- 1973 El Camino Estate

Overview
- Model years: 1973–1977
- Assembly: Arlington, Texas, United States, (Arlington Assembly); Baltimore, Maryland, United States, (Baltimore Assembly); Doraville, Georgia, United States, (Doraville Assembly); Fremont, California, United States, (Fremont Assembly); Leeds, Kansas City, Missouri, United States, (Leeds Assembly)

Body and chassis
- Platform: A-body
- Related: Chevrolet Chevelle; GMC Sprint

Powertrain
- Engine: 250 cu in (4.1 L) I6; 307 cu in (5.0 L) V8; 350 cu in (5.7 L) V8; 400 cu in (6.6 L) V8; 454 cu in (7.4 L) V8
- Transmission: 3-speed manual 4-speed manual 3-speed Turbo-Hydramatic auto.

=== 1973–1975 ===
For 1973, the El Camino was redesigned. Matching the Chevelle line and using the wagon chassis, it was the largest El Camino generation. Energy-absorbing hydraulic front bumper systems on these vehicles added more weight. There were two different trim levels of El Caminos during this period. The base model and SS option shared interior and exterior appointments with the Chevelle Malibu, while the El Camino Classic (introduced for 1974) shared its trim with the more upscale Chevelle Malibu Classic.

The chassis design was as new as the bodies with 1 in (25 mm) a wider wheel track, front and rear. The left wheel was adjusted to have slightly more positive camber than the right, which resulted in a more uniform and stable steering feel on high-crown road surfaces while maintaining excellent freeway cruise stability. Clearances for spring travel were also improved for a smoother ride over all types of surfaces; the coil springs at each wheel were computer-selected to match the individual car's weight. Front disc brakes were now standard on all '73 El Caminos. Additional new features were an acoustical double-panel roof, tighter-fitting glass, flush-style outside door handles, molded full-foam seat construction, flow-through power ventilation system, inside hood release, refined Delcotron generator and sealed side-terminal battery, a larger 22-US-gallon (83 L; 18 imp gal) fuel tank, and "flush and dry" rocker panels introduced first on the redesigned 1971 full-size Chevrolets. New options included swivel bucket seats (with console) and Turbine I urethane (backed by steel) wheels, as was the instrument gauge cluster. A benefit of the new body designs was much better visibility to which the unusually thin windshield pillars contributed. A structural improvement was a stronger design for the side door guard beams. El Caminos shared the "Colonnade" frameless door glass with other Chevelles, and would continue this feature into the next generation as well.

The 307 2-barrel V8 with 115 hp (86 kW) was the base engine. Options included a 350 2-barrel V8 with 145 hp (108 kW), a 350 4-barrel V8 with 175 hp (130 kW), and a 454 4-barrel V8 with 245 hp (183 kW). Hardened engine valve seats and hydraulic camshafts made these engines reliable for many miles, and allowed them to accept the increasingly popular unleaded regular gasoline. The three-speed manual transmission was standard; 4-speed manual and Turbo Hydra-Matic 3-speed automatic transmissions were optional. Crossflow radiators and coolant reservoirs prevented overheating.

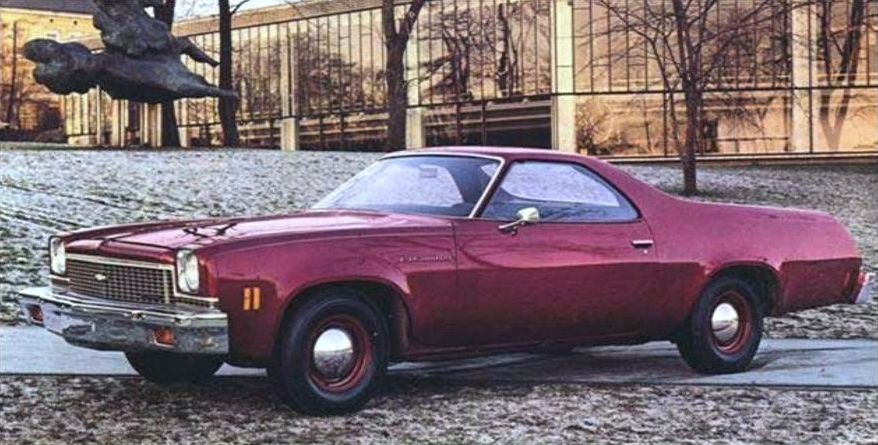
1973 El Camino

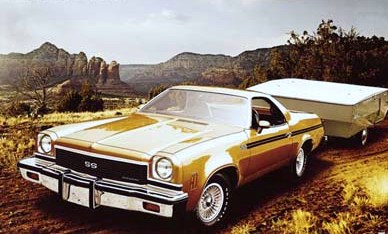
1973 El Camino SS

The SS, then a trim option, included a black grille with SS emblem, bodyside striping, bright roof drip moldings, color-keyed dual sport mirrors, special front and rear stabilizer bars, rally wheels, 70-series raised white-lettered tires, special instrumentation and SS interior emblems. The SS option was available with a 350 or 454 V8 with the 4-speed or Turbo Hydra-Matic transmissions. Also it was not widely known, but a Laguna S-3 front end could be fitted on these cars, and was available through the Central Office Production Option (COPO) system as code 6H1. It was not widely ordered by many however, more than likely due to limited information both on the part of customers and many dealers at the time.

The Estate (1973–1976), an option package, was first offered on the El Camino Standard and El Camino Custom, later only the El Camino Custom.

The 1974 El Caminos sported an elongated, Mercedes-type grille. Inside, the new top-of-the-line El Camino Classic featured luxurious interiors with notchback bench seats (or optional Strato bucket seats) upholstered in cloth or vinyl, carpeted door panels and woodgrain instrument panel trim. The 350 V8 became the base engine and a 400 V8 engine was new this year. The 454, the top engine, was available with the Turbo Hydra-Matic 400 automatic or 4-speed manual transmission.

The 1975 models featured a new grille, providing a fresh appearance. Suspension upgrades offered a quieter ride, and radial-ply tires became standard. Dual remote mirrors, new twin sport mirrors, intermittent wipers, and cruise control were among new convenience features this year. The 1975 high energy ignition (HEI) provided spark to the spark plugs with minimal maintenance and increased power. The larger distributor cap also provided better high-RPM performance by decreasing the likelihood of the spark conducting to the wrong terminal. The 250-cubic-inch in-line six of 105 hp (78 kW) was offered as the base engine. The 454-cubic-inch V8, downrated yet again to 215 hp (160 kW), made it into 1975 as an El Camino option, but this would be its last go-around. It was not available in California, and the optional four-speed stick was no longer offered. Buyers could now choose an Econominder instrument package that included a vacuum gauge to point out when optimum fuel economy was being attained.

=== 1976–1977 ===
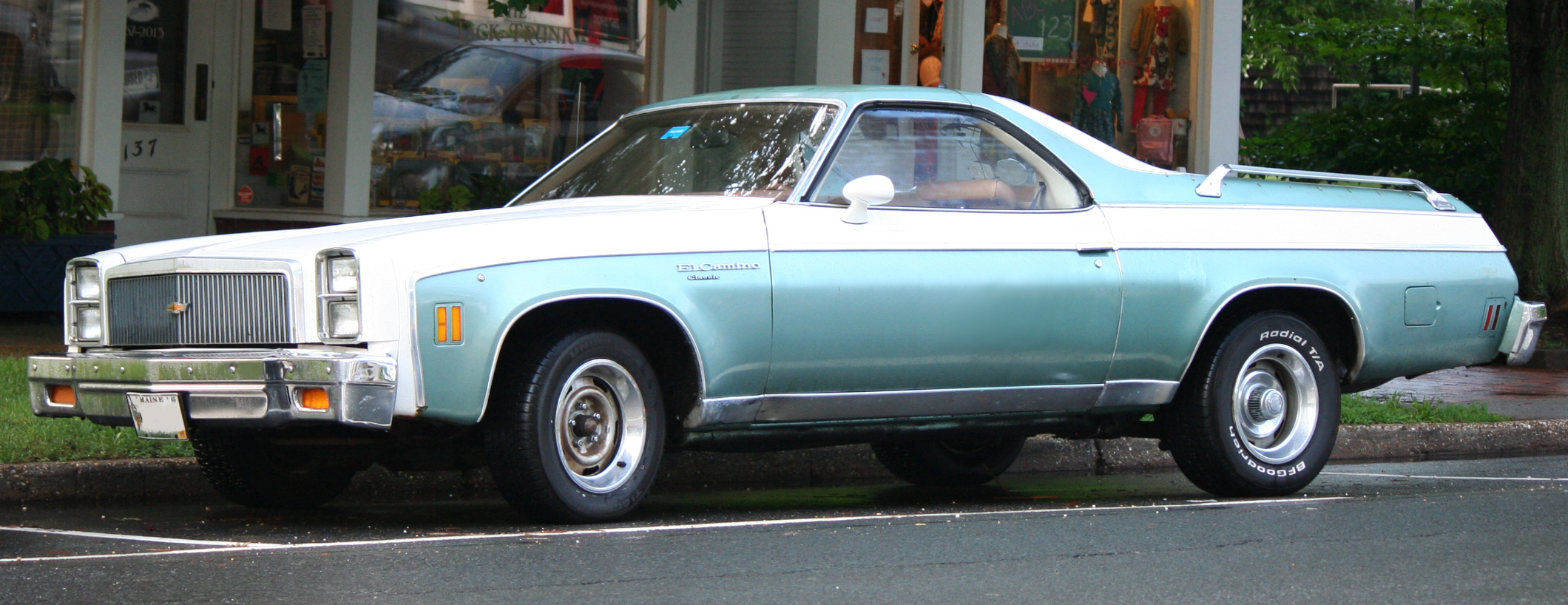
1977 El Camino Classic

For 1976, El Camino Classic models now featured the new rectangular headlights that other high-end GM cars were sporting. These were quad units in stacked arrangement. The base model retained the previously used dual round headlights. Engines included the base 250 I6 engine, a new 140 hp (104 kW) 305-cubic-inch V8, two- and four-barrel 350s (with availability still depending on California delivery), and the 400-cubic-inch V8, still good for 175 hp (130 kW). All engines except the 250 I6 came with the Turbo Hydra-matic automatic transmission as the only transmission available. The 250 I6 came with a 3-speed manual or an optional Turbo Hydra-matic.

The 1977 models were little changed, except the 400 V8 was gone. The El Camino Classic was again the top model and the SS option continued.

Production numbers
Model year	Total production	El Camino SS
1973	64,987	
1974	51,223	4,543
1975	33,620	3,521
1976	44,890	5,163
1977	54,321	5,226

== Fifth generation (1978–1987) ==
Fifth generation
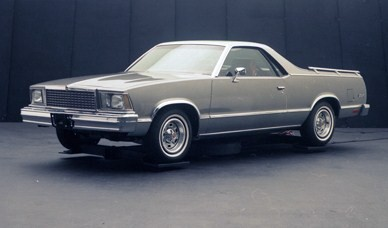
- 1978 El Camino

Overview
- Model years: 1978–1987
- Assembly: Arlington, Texas, United States, (Arlington Assembly: 1978–1984); Doraville, Georgia, United States, (Doraville Assembly: 1978–1981); Fremont, California, United States, (Fremont Assembly: 1978–1981); Leeds, Kansas City, Missouri, United States, (Leeds Assembly: 1978–1980); Ramos Arizpe, Coahuila, Mexico, (Ramos Arizpe Assembly: 1985–1987); Tehran, Iran (CKD, Pars Khodro)

Body and chassis
- Platform: A-body (1978–1981); G-body (1982–1987)
- Related: Chevrolet Monte Carlo; Chevrolet Malibu; GMC Caballero

Powertrain
- Engine: 3.3 L (200 cu in) Chevrolet V6; 3.8 L (229 cu in) Chevrolet V6; 3.8 L (231 cu in) Buick V6; 4.3 L (262 cu in) Chevrolet V6; 4.4 L (267 cu in) Small-Block V8; 5.0 L (305 cu in) Small-Block V8; 5.7 L (350 cu in) Small-Block V8; 5.7 L (350 cu in) LF9 diesel V8
- Transmission: 3-speed manual 4-speed manual 3-speed Turbo-Hydramatic automatic 4-speed Turbo-Hydramatic automatic

Dimensions
- Wheelbase: 117.1 in (2,974 mm)

=== 1978–1981 ===
A new, trimmer El Camino was unveiled in 1978, adopting the new, more sharp-edged Malibu styling, and a one-inch longer wheelbase of 117.1 in (2,974 mm). The front end sheet metal and doors were shared with the Malibu, and the rear bumper was shared with the Malibu station wagon. For the first time, though, the El Camino had a unique chassis – it was shared with no other Chevrolet. The front end featured a new single rectangular headlight design. The base engine was a 200-cubic-inch (3.3-liter) V6 that developed 95 hp (71 kW), except in California where, to meet emissions standards, the 231-cubic-inch Buick engine was the base engine. Two upgrades could be ordered: a 305-cubic-inch V8 with 145 hp (108 kW), or a 350-cubic-inch V8 with 170 hp (127 kW) that was only available in El Caminos and Malibu station wagons. It was not available on Malibu passenger cars (with exception to coupe and sedan Malibu 9C1 police vehicles).

The El Camino trims started with the base model, then the Conquista (meaning 'Conquest' in Spanish) which mainly consisted of a special paint treatment and finally the Super Sport which was the sports model available with six-cylinder and V8 engines. Chevrolet later offered a Black Knight model in 1978 which ended production after only 1,200 examples were produced due to legal problems with the rights holders over the use of the name. This model featured a large hood emblem of two dragons and a knight, and would be reworked and relaunched for 1979 as the Royal Knight option for Super Sport models.

Following its debut as a redesigned "new-size" model in 1978, the 1979 model received minimal changes, which amounted to a little more than a new divided grille. However, a "small-block" 267-cubic-inch (4.4-liter) V8 joined the options list and slotted between the standard 3.3-liter V6 and the optional 5.0-liter four-barrel V8. The 350-cubic-inch (5.7-liter) V8, developing 170 hp (127 kW) was again available. Both three- and four-speed manual transmissions had floor shifters. The Royal Knight option for the Super Sport debuted.

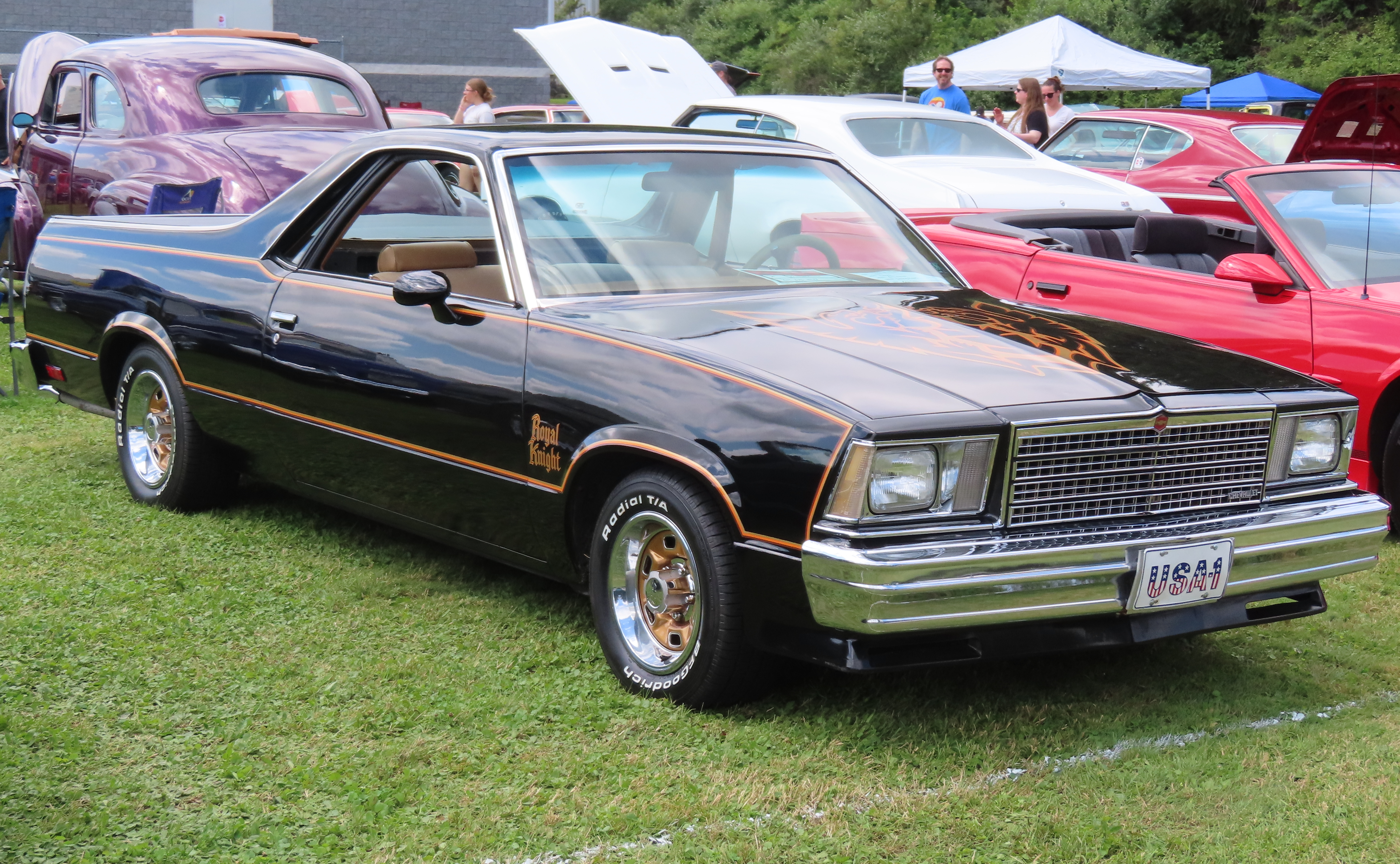
1979 El Camino Royal Knight

The 1980 El Camino started out the 1980s with few changes, though engine choices were shuffled a little. The base V6 displaced 229 cubic inches, up from 200 the year before. Horsepower increased from 94 to 115 hp (70 to 86 kW). Optional again were a 267-cubic-inch V8 with 125 hp (93 kW) and a 305 V8, now with 155 hp (116 kW) (down five). The 350 with 170 hp (127 kW) offered in 1979 was dropped. A three speed floor shifted manual transmission was standard, but most got the optional three-speed automatic.

The 1981 models received a new horizontal tube grille. The 1981 engines mostly continued from 1980, but now used GM's Computer Command Control (CCC) emission system. The base 229-cubic-inch V6 made 110 hp (82 kW) (down from 115 hp (86 kW)), as did the California-only 231-cubic-inch Buick V6. Optional engines were the 267-cubic-inch V8 with 115 hp (86 kW) and The 305-cubic-inch V8, now with 150 hp (112 kW). The three-speed automatic added a lock-up torque converter to aid highway mileage.

=== 1982–1987 ===
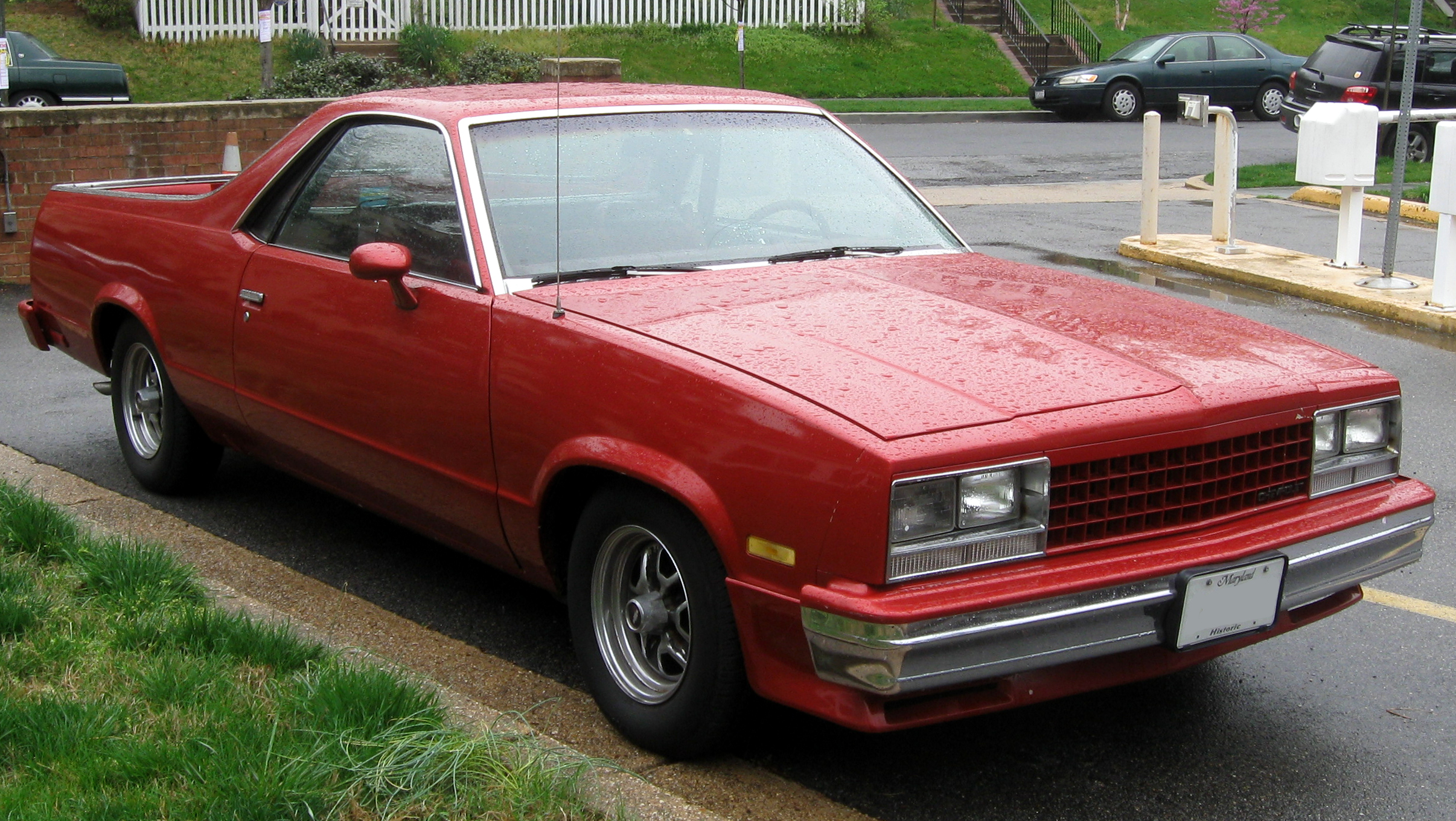
1982–1987 El Camino

The 1982 (through the final 1987) El Camino sported a new frontal appearance with a crosshatch grille flanked by quad rectangular headlights. New under the hood for 1982 was a 105 hp (78 kW) 5.7-liter (350-cubic-inch) Diesel V8, which was also offered in Chevrolet's full-size cars. Though mileage with the diesel was commendable, it was an expensive option and would eventually amass a dismal repair record. Gasoline-engine choices were unchanged, except Chevrolet's 229-cubic-inch (3.8-liter) V6 was now standard in California-bound cars, replacing Buick's 231-cubic-inch V6.

In 1983, the 4.4-liter V8 was gone, leaving the 5.0-liter version as the only optional gas V8. The standard engine was again Chevrolet's 3.8-liter V6 with 110 hp (82 kW), though California cars, once again, got a Buick V6 with similar specifications. Continuing on the options list was the 5.7-liter V8 Diesel with 105 hp (78 kW). The sister Malibu sedan and wagon were discontinued after the 1983 model year. The Royal Knight package was also discontinued in 1983.

The 1983–87 El Camino was also offered as a cosmetic conversion through select dealers (completed by Choo-Choo Customs Inc., of Chattanooga, Tennessee). Modifications included an aerodynamic front end similar to the Monte Carlo SS, side exhaust skirts, and aluminum wheels. The conversion also included the addition of SS decals on the exterior of the body. However, the majority of El Caminos sent for customizing weren't actual Super Sports. That distinction was only obtained by ordering the 'SS Sport Decor' option package from the factory which carries an RPO code of Z15.

For 1985, GM shifted El Camino production to Mexico, and the new fuel-injected 4.3 L V6 became the base engine through 1987. El Camino production ended quietly in late 1987. Some model year 1987s (420 El Caminos and 325 GMC Caballeros) are listed as new car retail deliveries in calendar year 1988 based on their date of first retail sale. Speculation in online forums indicates 3GCCW80H2HS915586 "may" be the final vehicle. The GM Media Archive/Heritage Center confirmed that no 1988 El Caminos or Caballeros were ever produced.

Production numbers
Model year	Total production	El Camino SS
1978	54,286	12,027
1979	58,008	11,371
1980	40,932	5,444
1981	36,711	3,769
1982	22,732	3,207
1983	24,010	2,914
1984	22,997	1,309
1985	21,816	1,198
1986	21,508	996
1987	13,743	861

== South Africa ==
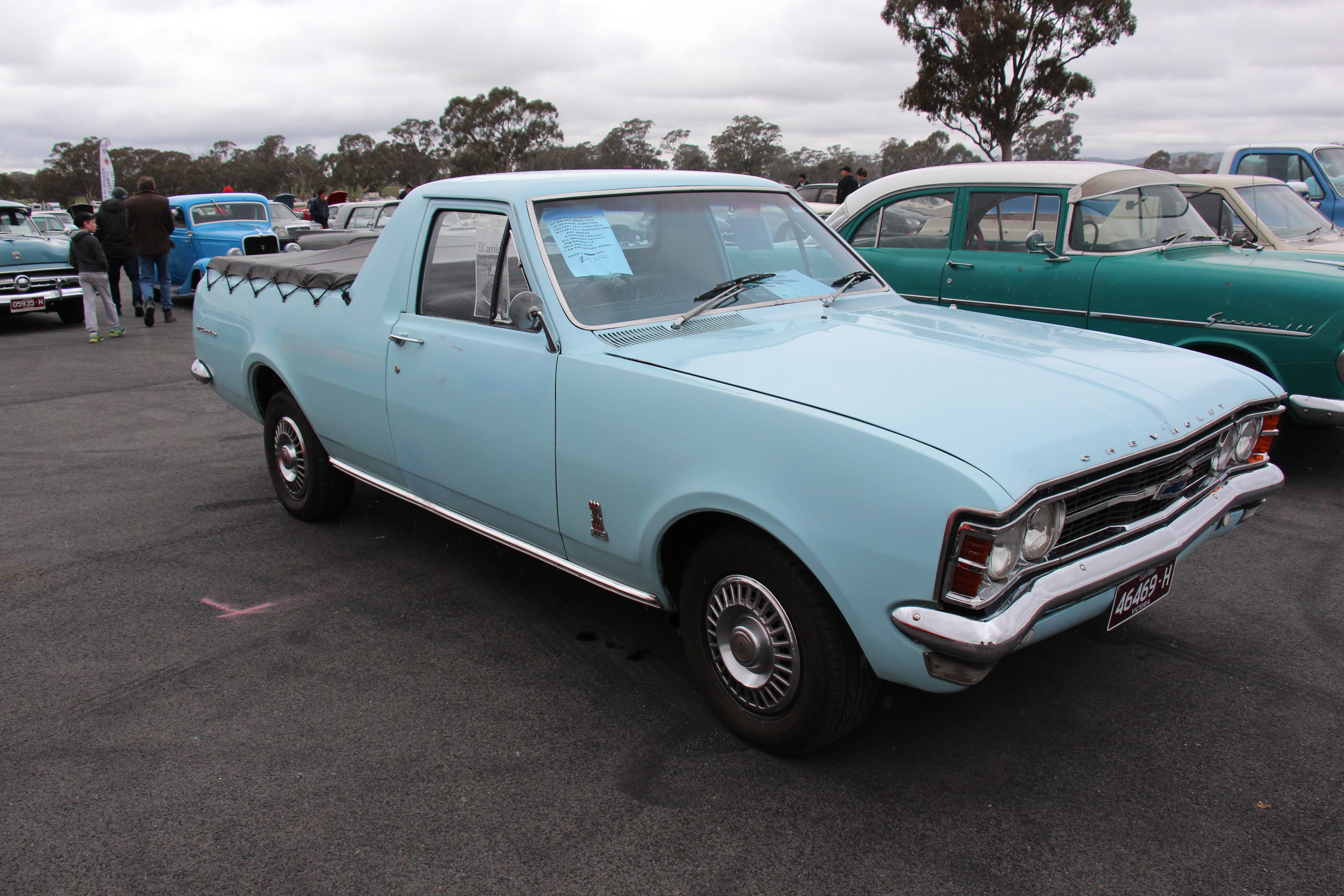
1971 Chevrolet El Camino (South Africa)

A range of Chevrolet models, based on the Holden HK, was introduced onto the South African market in 1969. A coupe utility version was released in 1971 under the Chevrolet El Camino name and was offered with imported Holden 186 six and 308 V8 engines. A version of the later Holden HQ utility was marketed in South Africa as the Chevrolet El Camino AQ. A facelifted El Camino AJ was released in 1976 with production ceasing in 1978.

== Concept vehicles ==
In 1974, Chevrolet's sister division, Pontiac, reportedly took an El Camino body, grafted on the urethane-nose front end from its Grand Am series, added the GA's instrument panel, reclining Strato-bucket seats with adjustable lumbar support along with Pontiac's Rally II wheels. This was a styling exercise for a possible Pontiac version of the El Camino; the concept never reached production.

In 1992, GM unveiled an El Camino concept, basically a pickup variant of the Chevrolet Lumina Z34. The concept received mixed, mostly negative reviews, mostly because of its front wheel drive layout.

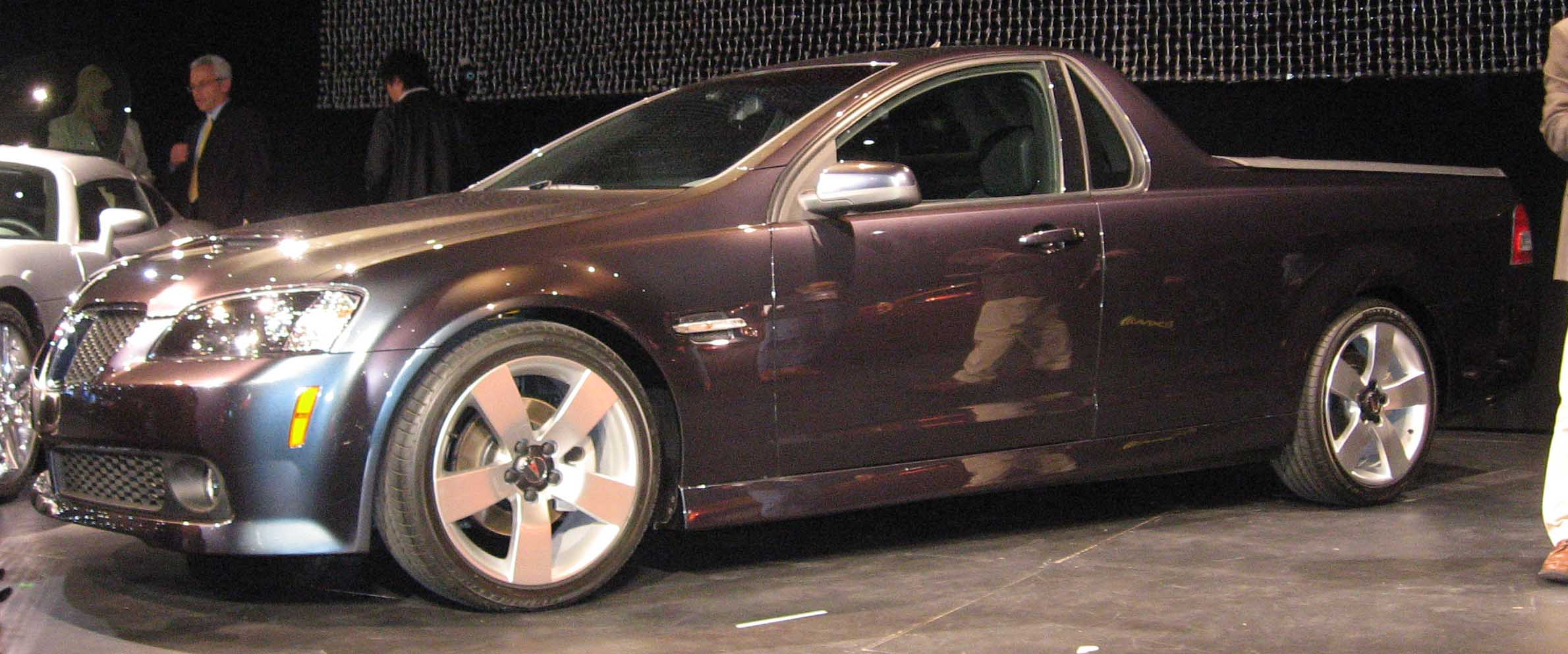
2010 Pontiac G8 ST concept at the 2008 New York Auto Show.

During the 1995 model year, GM had a concept El Camino based on the full-size Caprice station wagon using the grille of a 1994–96 Impala SS; this concept was destined for production, but was shelved when GM decided to discontinue the B-platform car line at the end of 1996.

The Pontiac G8 ST was shown at the New York International Auto Show in March 2008. Based on the Holden Commodore Ute, it shared the G8 platform with a 73 in (1,900 mm) cargo bed. The Sport Truck had the same 361 hp (269 kW), 6.0-liter V8 used in the G8 GT, as well as the 3.6-liter, 300 hp (220 kW) direct-injection V6. The G8 ST was slated for release as a 2010 model, but in January 2009, GM announced to dealers the G8 ST was cancelled due to budget cuts and restructuring, as well as the Pontiac brand being discontinued. In 2011, GM again considered bringing back the El Camino under the Chevrolet brand as early as 2015.
