= Corvair Powerglide =

Automatic transmission

Chevrolet Corvair Powerglide is a two-speed automatic transmission designed specially for the then all-new 1960 Chevrolet Corvair compact car that emerged in the fall of 1959 as Chevrolet's competitor in the then booming small car market. The Corvair was powered by a rear-mounted Chevrolet Turbo-Air 6 engine that necessitated a specially designed transaxle. Corvair Powerglide took the principles of the standard Chevrolet Powerglide and modified them to suit the rear-mounted powertrain location of the new Corvair. The Corvair used the Powerglide for all 10 years it was produced; from 1961 to 1963, Pontiac used a modified version of Corvair Powerglide it called 'TempesTorque' for its front-engine, rear-transaxle Tempest, LeMans and Tempest LeMans cars.

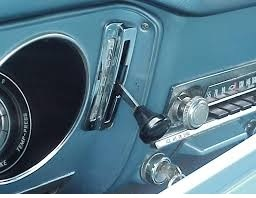
Dash-mounted Powerglide control lever, typically used on 1965–69 Corvairs. This is the "safety" lever used for the 1967–69 models.

== Operation ==
Corvair Powerglide is a fully automatic, two-speed, rear wheel drive aluminum-cased automatic transmission mounted directly to the forward face of the cast iron differential housing. It uses a three-element, welded assembly 10 in (25 cm) diameter torque converter mounted remotely on the rear face of the differential, (that also incorporates the starter ring gear, and a centrifugal fan baffle for cooling, via slots in the engine bellhousing) and is driven directly from the engine crankshaft by a flexplate inside the engine bellhousing. The selector quadrant is arranged R-N-D-L, or Reverse, Neutral, Drive and Low, with no "Park" (except in Pontiac's 1963 version, redesigned to handle the increased torque of a new V8 engine in Tempest and LeMans, added by means of a separate lever). Range selection is via dash-mounted selector lever operating a sheathed cable that moves a spool valve range selector in the transmission valve body. Drivers were expected to use the emergency brake to park the car in place of a parking pawl. Because it is fitted with a rear pump, the Corvair Powerglide was one of the last U.S.-built automatic transmissions that allowed the car to be push-started.

Due to the rear-mounted engine, the differential lies between the transmission and engine, so drive to the transmission from the engine is carried forward via a hollow turbine shaft from the engine mounted torque converter to the transmission gearbox. Power from the gearbox was carried rearward again to the differential pinion gear via yet another, concentric hollow shaft of larger diameter. A small concentric shaft inside the turbine shaft operated the front pump of the transmission to permit engagement of drive/reverse ranges when the car was stopped or moving slowly; at speeds over 15 mph (24 km/h), a differential-driven (from the car motion) rear pump of smaller capacity and greater efficiency took over and the front pump shut down to improve fuel economy.

The Corvair Powerglide provided one reduction range and reverse, in addition to direct drive and neutral. Low and Reverse ranges were a 1.82 ratio reduction, using a single planetary gearset. Locking the planetary geartrain provided a 1:1 direct drive. The differential driven rear pump permitted push-starting the Powerglide-equipped Corvair (the last American automatic to do so), at speeds over 18 mph (29 km/h) by creating adequate pressure to engage low band and turn over the engine via the torque converter. A multiple plate clutch engaged reverse range, low was braked using a band on the forward clutch drum, and direct provided via clutches. The torque converter of the Corvair offered 2.6:1 reduction at stall, and improved car performance when engine speeds were below ~2000 rpm.

When starting out in Drive range, low gear was automatically selected and the low band applied under pressure modulated by a vacuum modulator which sensed engine output and adjusted clutch and band apply pressures to provide smooth engagement without slip. As the vehicle accelerated, rear pump output would increase and initiate a shift to direct. The rear pump pressures were modified by a throttle valve, and governor, both of which could delay the upshift, or even trigger a forced downshift at driver command. Full throttle downshifts were achieved by the throttle valve which permitted the transmission to stay in low range or be forced into downshifting to speeds between 45–50 mph (72–80 km/h). At speeds under 35 mph (56 km/h), heavy throttle would delay upshifts, or initiate a forced 'detent touch' kickdown for better performance. When Low Range or Reverse are selected, the apply pressures are not modulated and the full line pressure of the transmission is applied to ensure positive engagement. The multiple plate reverse clutch and double wrap low band design offered a slight buffer to engagement to prevent harshness even under high apply pressures. A quite sophisticated valve body timed shifts and apply pressures carefully in Drive range to ensure smoothness and prevent 'hunting' between gears, which is a common complaint of small cars with automatic transmission. Corvair Powerglides had a good reputation for reliability and were ordered on a large majority of Corvair passenger cars.

The Powerglide shifter on the Early Model (EM) Corvairs, including all Forward Control vehicles (FCs - Vans and trucks) had a "tab" type lever mounted under the instrument panel to the right of the steering column. The indicator was a small window in the instrument cluster arranged in "L D N R" positions. In 1965, the lever was moved up to the right of the fuel gauge and was a "T" type small silver lever. The quadrant now read "R N D L." Until 1967, the shifter moved through the quadrants in a straight line. From 1967 through 1969, the lever remained in the 1965 position but due to safety concerns, required the driver to move it to the left (it was spring-loaded) to select Reverse and Low. The "T" handle was replaced with a large, mushroomed black plastic knob.

Corvair Powerglide was an all-new design, but borrowed a couple small parts from Chevrolet Turboglide and its operating concept is very similar to conventional Chevy Powerglide. Aluminum Powerglide, introduced in the conventional Chevrolet models in 1962 (starting with Chevy II) incorporated many features pioneered by Corvair Powerglide, scaled up slightly for the larger passenger car and light truck lines. The Corvair was originally intended to be only available with Powerglide, but late in its development, a manual transmission was also designed to help lower the base sticker price for its 1960 introduction. The Corvair Powerglide transmission remained largely in its original design throughout the Corvair's production, which ended in May 1969.

== See also ==
- Turbo-Hydramatic
