= Vacuum modulator =

Engine component

Vacuum Modulator is an engine load sensing device that converts engine vacuum into a transmission valve body input.

Most vacuum modulators operate with manifold vacuum (below throttle blades) that offer more vacuum at idle, and proportionately changes (rises and falls) with engine load as opposed to operating on engine speed.

Vacuum modulators in some transmissions were essential in the proper operation of many automatic transmissions. Broken springs or diaphragms would cause it either to be repaired or replaced. Some were repairable (early units) as later models would need entire replacement.

As the throttle blades are open the manifold or engine vacuum drops as ported vacuum (above throttle blades) increases. Many vacuum modulators also allow for tuning via a small blade screw driver that turns the thread to increase or decrease spring pressure against a diaphragm inside.
