= Oklahoma City Assembly =

Former General Motors assembly plant

Coordinates: 35°23′38.97″N 97°23′45.25″W

Oklahoma City Assembly was a General Motors automobile factory in Oklahoma City, Oklahoma.

== History ==
Construction on the 4,000,000-square-foot (370,000 m^{2}) plant started in 1974, and it opened in 1979 to produce the newly designed X-body cars for the 1980 model year. After X-body cars came A-body cars (1985-1996) and then the plant began producing the Oldsmobile Cutlass through 1999 and Chevrolet Malibu through 2001. The company spent $700,000,000 to convert the plant from building the Chevrolet Malibu to building the all-new GMT370 SUVs (Chevrolet TrailBlazer EXT, GMC Envoy XL, Isuzu Ascender LWB) in 2001 for the 2002 model year. The plant was damaged by a tornado on May 8, 2003, but the company repaired the damage and returned the plant to operations just 53 days later.

On December 6, 2005, General Motors alerted the United Auto Workers local 1999 that the plant would be closed in February 2006 as part of cost-saving measures. The last vehicle produced at the plant, a white Chevrolet TrailBlazer EXT SUV, rolled out on February 20, 2006. The Oklahoma City Assembly plant was the first of 12 GM manufacturing plants that GM planned to permanently close by 2008, to match production with market demand. An estimated 521,400 GMT370 SUVs were built at the Oklahoma City Assembly plant.

The Oklahoma City plant employed 2,400 people — 2,200 hourly and 200 salaried — but economists estimated that as many as 7,500 jobs in the area could be affected, including those at GM suppliers and secondary jobs, like hotel and restaurant workers.

Laid-off employees had the option of retiring or enrolling in GM's Jobs Bank, which allows workers to collect full pay and benefits as they attend classes or volunteer at community agencies. Some workers would continue to be paid through September 2007, when GM's UAW contract expired.

On May 13, 2008, the voters of Oklahoma County approved the purchase of the plant, which was to be leased to neighboring Tinker Air Force Base, which borders the north side of the plant.

== Products ==
- 2004–2005 GMC Envoy XUV
- 2003–2006 Isuzu Ascender extended length
- 2002–2006 Chevrolet TrailBlazer EXT
- 2002–2006 GMC Envoy XL
- 1997–2001 Chevrolet Malibu
- 1997–1999 Oldsmobile Cutlass
- 1989–1996 Oldsmobile Cutlass Ciera
- 1988–1991 Pontiac 6000
- 1982–1996 Buick Century
- 1982–1989 Chevrolet Celebrity
- 1980–1983 Chevrolet Citation
- 1980–1982 Pontiac Phoenix
