= Hummer H3 =

Off-road vehicle produced from 2006 to 2010

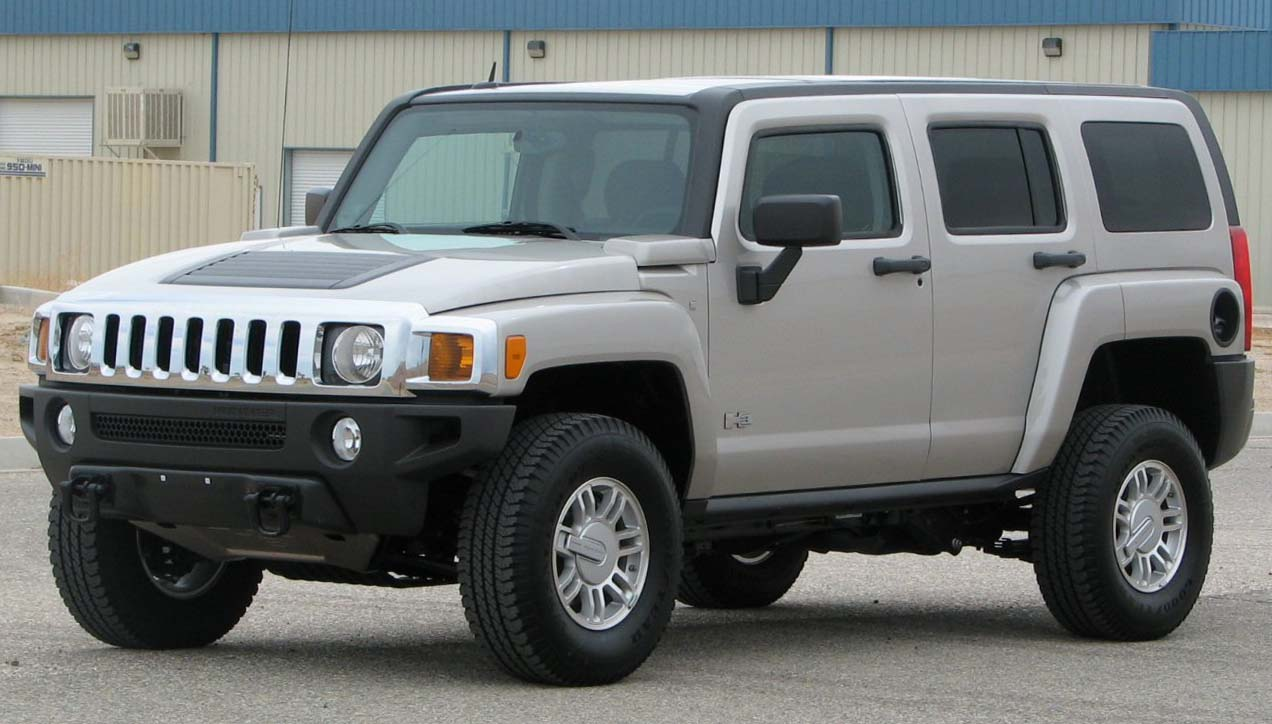
- 2007 Hummer H3

Overview
- Manufacturer: General Motors
- Production: April 2005 – May 24, 2010
- Model years: 2006–2010
- Assembly: United States: Shreveport, Louisiana; South Africa: Port Elizabeth (GMSA); Russia: Kaliningrad (Avtotor)

Body and chassis
- Class: Mid-size SUV mid-size pickup truck (H3T)
- Body style: 4-door SUV (GMT345); 4-door pickup truck (GMT745)
- Layout: Front engine, four-wheel drive
- Platform: GM GMT345 platform
- Related: Chevrolet Colorado; GMC Canyon; Isuzu i-Series; Isuzu D-Max (RA, RC); Holden Colorado (Australasia)

Powertrain
- Engine: 3.5 L (211 CID) L52 I5 (2006 only); 3.7 L (223 CID) LLR I5; 5.3 L (325 CID) LH8 V8
- Transmission: 5-speed Aisin AR5 manual 4-speed 4L60-E automatic

Dimensions
- Wheelbase: H3: 111.9 in (2,842 mm); H3T: 134.2 in (3,409 mm)
- Length: H3 188.1 in (4,778 mm) with rear tire carrier; H3T 212.7 in (5,403 mm)
- Width: 74.7 in (1,897 mm)
- Height: 2006–2007: 73.7 in (1,872 mm); 2008–2010: 73.2 in (1,859 mm)
- Curb weight: 4,600–4,900 lb (2,087–2,223 kg)

Chronology
- Predecessor: Hummer H2
- Successor: GMC Hummer EV

The Hummer H3 is an off-road vehicle that was produced by General Motors and marketed by Hummer from 2005 to 2010. The smallest model of the Hummer lineup, it was offered as a 5-door SUV or a 4-door pickup truck known as the H3T. Unlike the larger H1 and H2 models, the H3 was not developed by AM General. It was introduced for the 2006 model year, based on a modified GMT355 that underpinned the Chevrolet Colorado/GMC Canyon compact pickup trucks that were also built at GM's Shreveport Operations in Shreveport, Louisiana, and the Port Elizabeth plant in South Africa. While mechanically related to the Colorado and Canyon, GM claims they share only 10% of their components, with the chassis modified and reinforced for heavy off-road duties.

== Powertrains ==
The H3 was launched with a 3.5 liter straight-5 cylinder L52 engine that produced 220 hp (160 kW) and 225 lbf⋅ft (305 N⋅m) of torque and was mated to a standard five-speed Aisin AR5 manual transmission or an optional Hydra-Matic 4L60-E four-speed automatic transmission. In 2007 this engine was replaced by the 3.7 liter LLR that produced 242 hp (180 kW) and 242 lbf⋅ft (328 N⋅m) of torque, figures that were revised in 2009 to 239 hp (178 kW) and 241 lbf⋅ft (327 N⋅m). Under revised EPA testing standards when equipped with either transmission this straight-5 engine achieved 14 mpg_{‑US} (17 L/100 km) in the city and 18 mpg_{‑US} (13 L/100 km) on the highway with a combined average of 15 mpg_{‑US} (16 L/100 km).

Available solely with the 4L60-E automatic transmission, a 5.3 liter LH8 V8 engine producing 300 hp (224 kW) and 320 lbf⋅ft (434 N⋅m) of torque was added in 2008 for the Alpha model. The V8 version had lower fuel economy, estimated at 13 mpg_{‑US} (18 L/100 km) in the city, 16 mpg_{‑US} (15 L/100 km) on the highway, with a combined average of 14 mpg_{‑US} (17 L/100 km).

In 2007, a H3X edition was added. It included the luxury package, 18-inch chrome wheels with unique center caps, chrome trim, chrome tube steps, a body-colored grille and a hard tire cover. The H3X also came with exclusive colors of Sonoma Red Metallic or Desert Orange Metallic.

== Capabilities ==
The H3 featured a two-speed, electronically controlled full-time four-wheel drive system that made it well-suited for both on-road and off-road driving. An electronic locking rear differential was optional, with a locking front differential also becoming an option on later models. Like the Hummer H2, the H3 can ford 27 inches (690 mm) of water (tested in depths up to 34 in or 864 mm) at a speed of 5 mph (8.0 km/h) and 20 in (508 mm) of water at a speed of 20 mph (32 km/h). Standard ground clearance with the 31-inch tires was 9.7 in (246 mm) while the approach, departure, and breakover angles were 37.4°, 34.7°, and 22.1° respectively, allowing the H3 to scale a 16-inch (406 mm) vertical wall and negotiate grades of 60% and side slopes of 40%. Front and rear recovery hooks were standard, with an optional trailer hitch and wiring harness. The H3 features a traction control that can use the brakes independently to stop wheelspin and improve traction while adjusting to road conditions. It is also equipped with Stabilitrak stability control and ABS with variable brake force distribution assist.

The optional Adventure or Off Road package included 33-inch tires, off-road shocks, differential lockers and 4:1 low range gearing. These upgrades increased ground clearance, suspension articulation, approach and departure angles, and increased the H3's undercarriage protection.

Maximum towing capacities were 3,000 lb (1,361 kg) for the straight-5 with manual transmission, 4,500 lb (2,041 kg) for the straight-5 with automatic transmission, and 6,000 lb (2,722 kg) for the V8 with automatic transmission. Cargo volume with the second-row seats in the upright position was 25.0 cubic feet (0.71 m^{3}) that could be expanded to a maximum of 62.8 cubic feet (1.78 m^{3}) when the seats are folded down. The V8 models featured the least payload capacity of just over 1,100 lb (499 kg) while the straight-5, manual transmission models were rated at 1,300 lb (590 kg) payload.

== Safety ==
Electronic stability control, anti-lock four-wheel disc brakes, brake-controlled traction control, LATCH child-seat anchors, and tire-pressure monitoring were standard features on the H3. Side-curtain airbags were optional until 2008 when they were made standard across. The H3 was rated Acceptable, the second highest rating, by the Insurance Institute for Highway Safety in both frontal offset and side-impact crashes (with side airbags) and Poor, the lowest rating, for rear-crash protection/head restraints.

The U.S. National Highway Traffic Safety Administration (NHTSA) gave the 2008 H3 the following scores:

Frontal Driver:
Frontal Passenger:
Side Driver:
Side Rear Passenger:
AWD Rollover:

== H3T ==
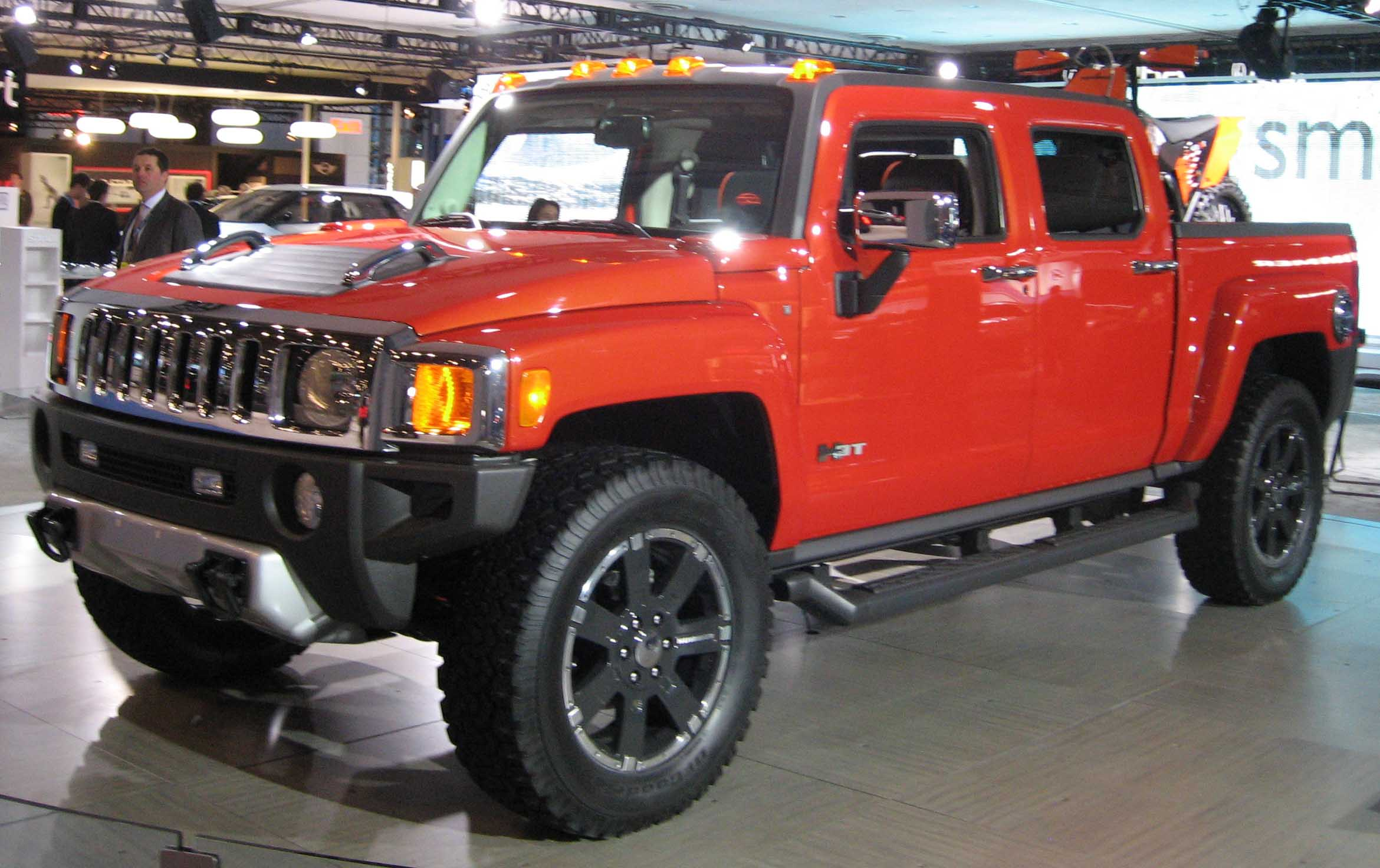
2009 Hummer H3T

The Hummer H3T is a mid-size pickup truck that was available during the 2009 and 2010 model years.

The vehicle was originally developed as a regular cab (two-door) concept pickup truck in 2003, that was shown at the 2004 Los Angeles Auto Show. The five-passenger four-door crew-cab production version appeared at the 2008 Chicago Auto Show. The H3T featured a 5-foot bed with built-in storage boxes and came in standard H3T, H3T Adventure, H3T Luxury, and H3T Alpha (with cloth or leather trim) trim packages.

A road test by Motor Trend reported the 2009 truck "crawled up rock steps, ran through sand washes, and navigated steep ledges with confidence and capability to spare." They described its turning radius "uncomfortably wide" and said "at highway cruising it would've been nice to have a faster, firmer feel.

== Features and options ==
The Hummer H3 and H3T were intended to be a smaller and more affordable version of the larger Hummer H2 and H2 SUT. Therefore, many of the luxury features that were standard on the H2 and H2 SUT were optional on the H3 and H3T.

Even though the Hummer H3 and H3T were not as luxurious as their H2 and H2 SUT counterparts, they still came well-equipped. Standard features included alloy wheels, leather-wrapped steering wheel, premium cloth seating surfaces, an AM/FM-CD player audio system with a six-speaker audio system, keyless entry, power windows and door locks, air conditioning, four-wheel-drive, a five-speed manual transmission, dual front bucket seats, a folding rear bench seat, aluminum interior trim, a Driver Information Center (DIC) in the gauge cluster, and a 3.5L Inline Five-Cylinder (I5) gasoline engine.

Options available on the H3 and H3T included chrome-clad alloy wheels, additional chrome exterior trim, AM/FM radio with single-CD player with MP3 capability (later, an AM/FM stereo with an in dash 6-disc changer with MP3 capability) radios with auxiliary audio inputs, a touchscreen GPS navigation system, SiriusXM Satellite Radio, OnStar, remote vehicle start, a security system, luxury leather-trimmed seating surfaces with dual heated front bucket seats, a dual-zone climate control system, a Bluetooth hands-free phone system (later models only), a Monsoon premium audio system with amplifier and subwoofer, an automatic transmission, and a 5.3L Vortec V8 gasoline engine (H3 Alpha and H3T Alpha only).

== Yearly U.S. sales ==
Calendar year	H3	H3T	Total
2005	33,140	N/A	33,140
2006	54,052	N/A	54,052
2007	43,431	N/A	43,431
2008	20,681	692	21,373
2009	5,487	2,046	7,533
Total	156,791	2,738	159,529

== International markets ==
In 2007, GM South Africa launched Hummer production in Port Elizabeth. The plant manufactured the Hummer H3 for the South African market, as well as units exported to Europe, Asia and Australia. In Australia, Hummer vehicles were only sold by special Holden-Saab-Hummer dealerships.

The H3 was qualified in 2010 by the Japanese Transport Ministry for tax breaks that set easier fuel efficiency standards for heavier vehicles. The 4,700-pound (2,132 kg) H3's 16 mpg_{‑US} (15 L/100 km; 19 mpg_{‑imp}) average in city traffic cleared the required Japanese emissions standards relative to its weight. A total of 723 Hummers were sold in Japan during the 12 months before March 2009.

== Motorsports ==
Robby Gordon competed in the 2010 Dakar Rally in a purpose built, tube frame chassis H3, finishing eighth overall.

== Plug-in hybrid ==
In early 2009, Raser Technologies and FEV built a prototype plug-in hybrid H3 that could achieve up to 100 MPG equivalent, using its battery. This vehicle was renamed the Electric Hummer H3, and later showcased by California State Governor Arnold Schwarzenegger at a press conference at the State Capitol in Sacramento as part of a campaign to promote greener vehicles.

== Discontinuation ==
At the end of February 2010, General Motors announced it would discontinue the Hummer brand. After filling a rental-car fleet order, the last Hummer H3T rolled off the assembly line at Shreveport on May 24, 2010.
