= GMC Envoy =

American mid-size sport utility vehicle

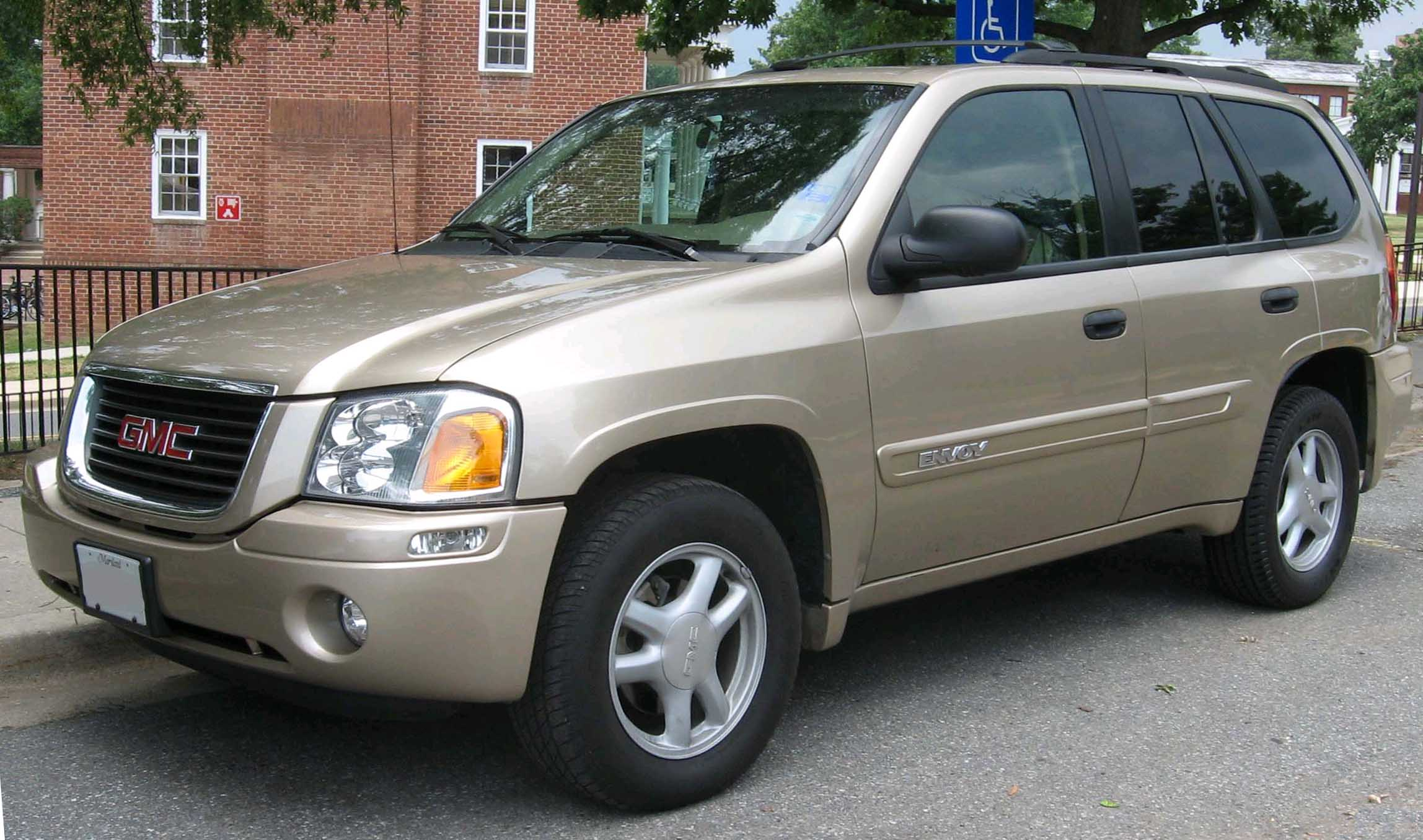

Overview
- Manufacturer: General Motors
- Production: 1997–2008
- Model years: 1998–2009

Body and chassis
- Class: Mid-size SUV
- Body style: 5-door SUV
- Layout: Front engine, rear-wheel drive / four-wheel drive
- Chassis: Body-on-frame

Chronology
- Predecessor: GMC Jimmy
- Successor: GMC Terrain; GMC Acadia (Envoy XL)

The GMC Envoy is a mid-size SUV manufactured and marketed by General Motors for the 1998 to 2009 model years over two generations. Adopting a nameplate used by GM Canada, the Envoy was phased in as a trim variant of the GMC Jimmy alongside the similar Chevrolet TrailBlazer.

The second generation of the GMC Envoy replaced the Jimmy outright, again sharing a common platform with the Trailblazer; General Motors also marketed the chassis architecture under various other nameplates, including the Oldsmobile Bravada, Buick Rainier, Isuzu Ascender, and Saab 9-7X.

General Motors assembled the model line at its Moraine Assembly (Moraine, Ohio) and Oklahoma City Assembly (Oklahoma City, Oklahoma). Both facilities were closed by 2008, leading to the discontinuation of the model line. The Envoy was not directly replaced in the GMC model line as General Motors transitioned its smaller SUVs to unibody-chassis designs, introducing the smaller GMC Terrain and larger GMC Acadia.

== First generation (1998–2000) ==
First generation
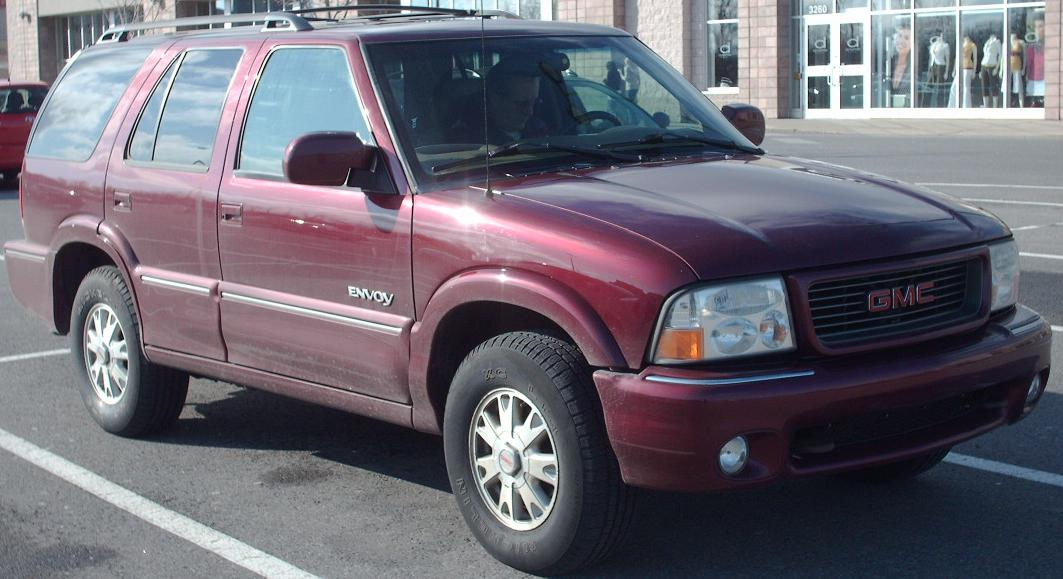
- 1998-2000 GMC Envoy

Overview
- Also called: Chevrolet Blazer GMC Jimmy Oldsmobile Bravada
- Model years: 1998–2000
- Assembly: United States: Moraine, Ohio (Moraine Assembly)
- Designer: William S. Davis

Body and chassis
- Body style: 4-door SUV
- Platform: GMT330
- Related: Chevrolet S-10 Blazer; GMC Jimmy; Oldsmobile Bravada

Powertrain
- Engine: 4.3 L (262 cu in) Vortec 4300 V6
- Power output: 190 hp
- Transmission: 4-speed 4L60-E automatic
- Hybrid drivetrain: 4WD

Dimensions
- Wheelbase: 1070 in (2.71 m)
- Length: 181.2 in (4.6 m)
- Width: 67.8 in (1.72 m)
- Height: 67 in (1.7 m)
- Curb weight: 4150 lbs (1882 kg)

The first generation GMC Envoy was introduced for the 1998 model year. Introduced a year before the Chevrolet TrailBlazer, the Envoy was the highest-trim version of the GMC Jimmy SUV. In line with the Oldsmobile Bravada, the Envoy was fitted with a leather-trim interior, floor-mounted shifter, and a largely monochromatic exterior with aluminum-alloy wheels. In line with the TrailBlazer and the Bravada, the Envoy trim was offered only in the five-door version.

The Envoy had many extra features not available on the regular Jimmy 4-door including: a remote trunk release, heated driver's and passenger's seats, a Bose sound system, and High Intensity Discharge headlights. Optional features included: a power sunroof, a panic alarm, an anti-theft system, and a power front driver & passenger seat.

GMC ended sales of the first generation Envoy after the 2000 model year as the division adopted the name to replace the entire Jimmy SUV line for 2002.

=== Safety features ===
The 1998-2000 GMC Envoy had a four-wheel antilock braking system standard as well as standard front driver and passenger airbags. However, the Envoy received a Poor rating in the IIHS frontal offset crash test.

== Second generation (2002–2009) ==
Second generation
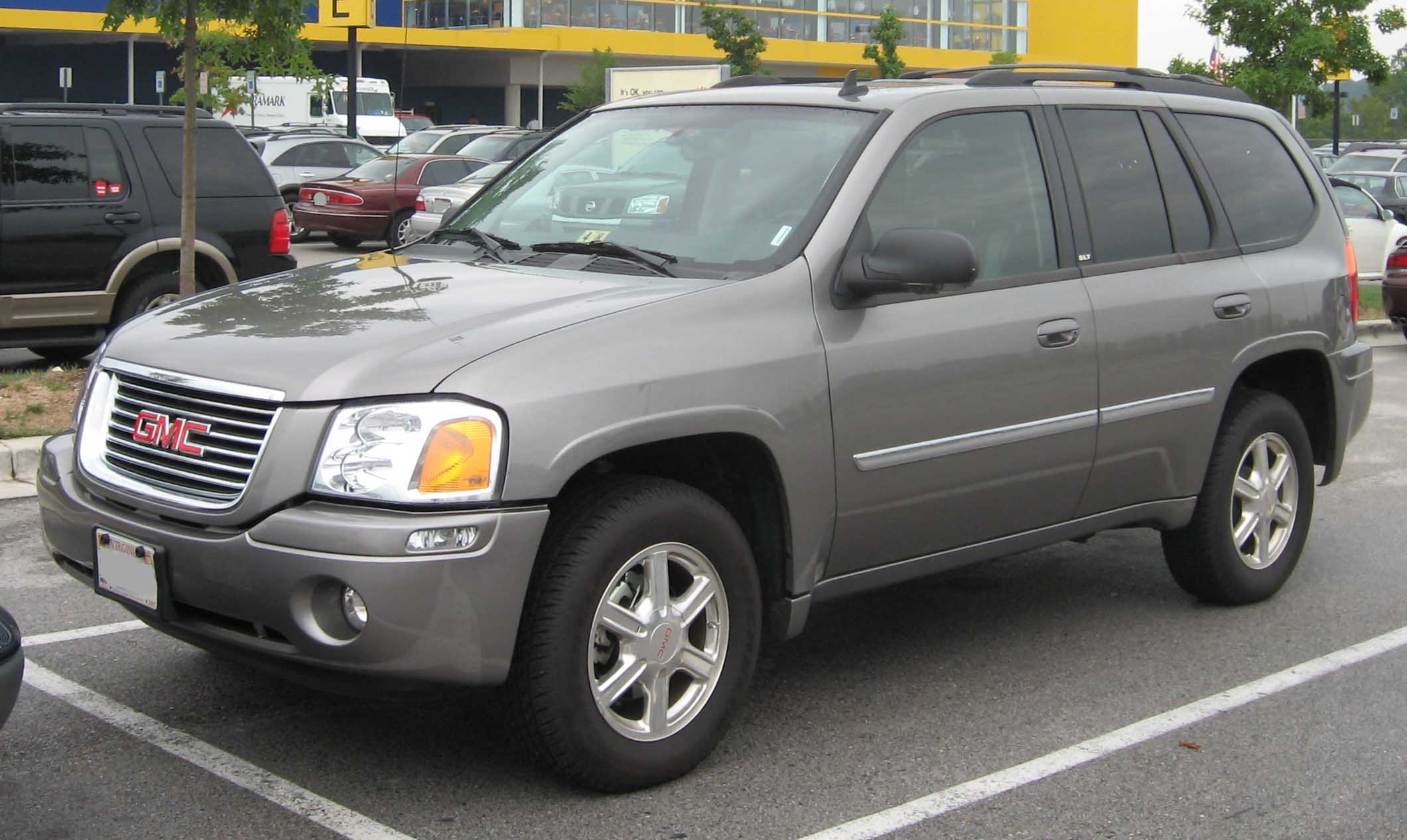
- 2006–2009 Envoy

Overview
- Also called: Chevrolet TrailBlazer (Venezuela)
- Model years: 2002–2009
- Assembly: United States: Moraine, Ohio (Moraine Assembly); Oklahoma City, Oklahoma (Oklahoma City Assembly) (XL and XUV models only)
- Designer: Bill Davis

Body and chassis
- Platform: GMT360; GMT370 (Envoy XL); GMT305 (Envoy XUV)
- Related: Buick Rainier; Chevrolet SSR; Chevrolet TrailBlazer; Isuzu Ascender; Oldsmobile Bravada; Saab 9-7X

Powertrain
- Engine: 4.2 L LL8 I6; 5.3 L LM4 V8
- Transmission: 4-speed 4L60-E automatic

Dimensions
- Wheelbase: 113.0 in (2,870 mm); 129.0 in (3,277 mm) (XL/XUV)
- Length: 191.6 in (4,867 mm); 207.6 in (5,273 mm) (XL); 208.4 in (5,293 mm) (XUV)
- Width: 74.7 in (1,897 mm)
- Height: 71.9 in (1,826 mm); 75.5 in (1,918 mm) (XL); 77.0 in (1,956 mm) (XUV)

The second generation GMC Envoy was introduced in early 2001 as a 2002 model (skipping the 2001 model year). In line with the Chevrolet Trailblazer replacing the Chevrolet (S-10) Blazer, the 2002 Envoy replaced the GMC Jimmy five-door.

The Envoy was Motor Trend magazine's Sport/Utility of the Year for 2002. The 4200 Vortec 4200 engine I6 engine was named one of Ward's 10 Best Engines from 2002 to 2005.

=== Chassis ===
The second generation GMC Envoy uses the body-on-frame GMT360 chassis architecture. Ending its commonality with GM compact pickup trucks, the GMT360 chassis was designed from the ground up for SUV use. The frame rails are hydroformed and fully boxed for their entire length. The wheelbase grew to 113 inches (six inches longer than the first generation); for the first time, an extended-wheelbase version was introduced with a 129-inch wheelbase length (1 inch shorter than the GMC Yukon XL).

The front suspension used a double-wishbone independent configuration with Bilstein shock absorbers. The rear suspension featured a 5-link solid rear axle; load-leveling air suspension was an option for the rear axle.

The second-generation Envoy adopted four-wheel disc brakes as standard equipment.

==== Powertrain ====
For its 2002 debut, the GMT360 Envoy received an all-new standard engine, with a Vortec 4200 4.2L inline-6 replacing the previous 4.3L V6. The first inline-6 from GM in North America since 1984, the "Atlas" engine produced 270 hp (80 more than its V6 predecessor). Beginning in 2003, the Envoy XL could be equipped with an optional 290 hp 5.3L V8. For 2005, the 5.3L V8 was updated to include the Displacement on Demand variable-displacement system (using 4 of 8 cylinders during low-load situations), increasing output to 300 hp.

Alongside a standard rear-wheel drive layout, the GMT360 Envoy was offered with either permanent 2-wheel drive or a 4x4 "Shift On-Demand" system, offering 2-wheel drive, Automatic 4-wheel drive, and High-range and Low-range 4-wheel drive (the latter, in 2.69:1 reduction). Two rear axles were offered, a rear "Posi-Trac" limited-slip differential and an Eaton automatic rear locking differential.

=== Trim ===
Throughout its production run, the Envoy was available in three different trim levels:

The base SLE trim level was produced from 2002 to 2009, and included a plentiful amount of standard equipment, including full power equipment (power front seats, power door locks, power windows, and power mirrors), keyless entry, cloth seating surfaces, an A/M-F/M stereo with single-disc CD player (later, with satellite radio), a four-speaker audio system, OnStar, aluminum-alloy wheels, a full-size spare tire with black-painted steel spare wheel, a 65/35 split-folding rear bench seat, faux carbon fiber interior trim panels, a cruise control, a dual-zone, manual climate control system, the 4.2L Vortec Inline Six-Cylinder (I6) gasoline engine, and a four-speed automatic transmission. Optional features included an in-dash, six-disc CD changer, a Bose six-speaker premium amplified audio system, a rear DVD entertainment system by Panasonic, a security system, polished aluminum-alloy wheels, a leather-wrapped steering wheel, luxury leather-trimmed seating surfaces, dual heated front bucket seats, and a power moonroof.

The uplevel SLT trim level, available from 2002 to 2009, added extra luxury and convenience features to the base SLE trim, including a six-disc, in-dash CD changer, a Bose six-speaker premium amplified audio system, OnStar, polished aluminum-alloy wheels, luxury leather-trimmed seating surfaces, dual heated front bucket seats, Driver Information Center, faux wood interior trim panels, a universal garage door opener system with a travel note recorder, a dual-zone, automatic climate control system, and a driver's memory system for driver's seat, mirrors, and radio preset settings. Optional features included an in-dash, touchscreen GPS navigation system (later models), a rear DVD entertainment system by Panasonic, and a power moonroof.

The top-of-the-line Denali trim level, available from 2005 to 2008, was the most luxurious trim level of the Envoy, adding additional luxury features to the also luxurious SLT trim. Additional features included additional faux wood interior trim accents, a two-tone, luxury leather-trimmed interior, a 'Denali' emblem for the steering wheel, the 5.3L Vortec V8 gasoline engine, a power single-pane moonroof, unique chrome-plated aluminum-alloy wheels, satellite radio, and a chrome mesh front upper grille. Additional options included an in-dash, touchscreen GPS navigation system and a rear DVD entertainment system.

=== Body ===
Replacing the GMC Jimmy completely, the second-generation GMC Envoy was offered solely as a five-door SUV. Within the GMT360 model family, the Envoy shares its body most closely with the Isuzu Ascender; the two model lines differ primarily in their front bumpers, grille and side body moldings.

To accommodate third-row seating within the model line, an extended-length Envoy XL was introduced. Sixteen inches longer than the standard Envoy, the Envoy XL effectively bridged the gap in length between the full-size Yukon and Yukon XL SUVs. Distinguished by body-color C-pillars, the XL received its own rear door stampings. For 2004, GMC introduced the 5-passenger GMC Envoy XUV, combining the functionality of a pickup truck and an SUV. Derived from the Envoy XL, the XUV used a retractable rear roof and a folding "mid-gate" to create a plastic-lined reconfigurable cargo area.

=== Model history ===
==== 2003 ====
For 2003, to lower the price of the model line, GMC began to offer several options as stand-alone features (instead of grouping them together); front-seat side airbags were demoted to optional status. The headlight switch was revised, allowing an override of the Daytime Running Lamps (DRLs). The head restraints were revised from 4-way to 2-way movement.

A 290 hp 5.3L V8 was introduced as an option for standard-length Envoys and the Envoy XL; all versions received a 22-gallon fuel tank.

==== 2004 ====
The model year was largely a carryover for the Envoy SUV. For the interior, adjustable pedals became an option, alongside XM Satellite Radio and an optional DVD-based navigation system. Derived from the Envoy XL, the Envoy XUV was a retractable-roof vehicle, combining the design capability of an SUV with a pickup truck.

==== 2005 ====
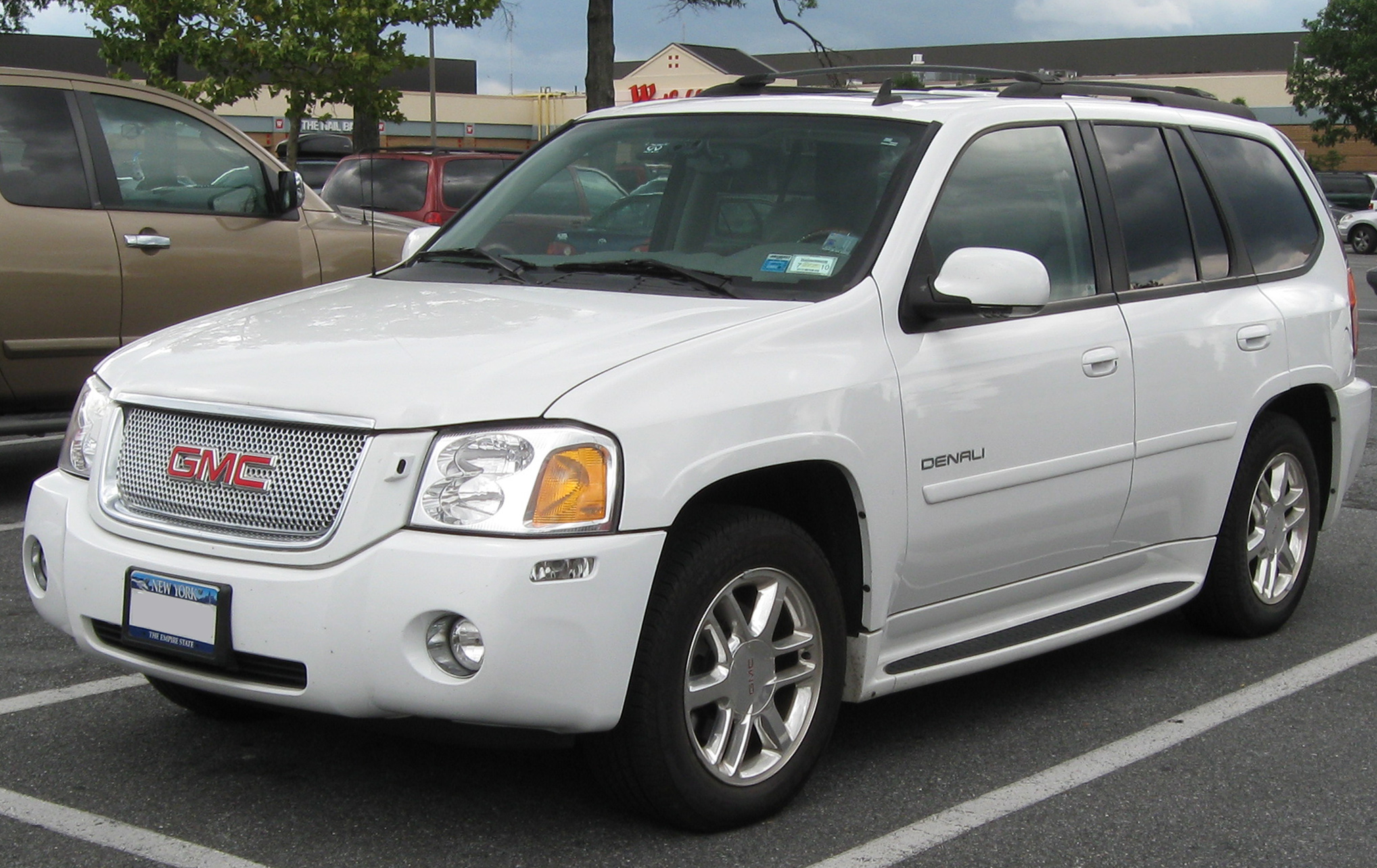
GMC Envoy Denali

Following the discontinuation of the Oldsmobile Bravada, GMC expanded its Denali model range to the Envoy for 2005, including both versions of the model line. Along with its own grille design and chromed alloy wheels, the interior received standard leather trim, heated power seats, rain-sensing windshield wipers, and upgraded wood trim.

For all versions of the Envoy, GMC introduced revised seats; optional side airbags were replaced by full-length side curtain airbags (covering all three rows of seats in the Envoy XL). The DVD navigation system option was updated, adopting a touchscreen interface.

The 5.3L V8 was upgraded with a variable-displacement Displacement on Demand system, using four of eight cylinders in low-workload driving.

==== 2006 ====
For 2006, Stabilitrak stability control was made a standard feature alongside cruise control, OnStar, and a tire pressure monitoring system. The Envoy Denali received updated 18-inch alloy wheels.

Following low sales of the vehicle, the Envoy XUV was dropped from the model line for 2006.

==== 2007 ====
Following the discontinuation of the Envoy XL, all versions of the model line were now offered with five-passenger seating.

==== 2008 ====
For 2008, side-curtain airbags (introduced as an option in 2005) were made standard.

==== 2009 ====
For 2009, few functional changes were made, with Bluetooth wireless technology for wireless phones added as a new option.

Following the closure of Moraine Assembly, GMC ended sales of the model line after the 2009 model year, with its role in the GMC line largely succeeded by the GMC Terrain CUV/wagon. This marked the Envoy's final year.

=== Recall ===
In 2012, General Motors had recalled more than 258,000 SUVs in the U.S. and Canada to fix short-circuits in power window and door lock switches that could cause fires. The recall covered Chevrolet TrailBlazer, GMC Envoy, Buick Rainier, Isuzu Ascender and Saab 9-7X SUVs from the 2006 and 2007 model years. The SUVs were sold or registered in 20 U.S. states, Washington, D.C., and Canada, where salt and other chemicals are used to clear roads in the winter.

=== Variants ===
==== Envoy XL ====
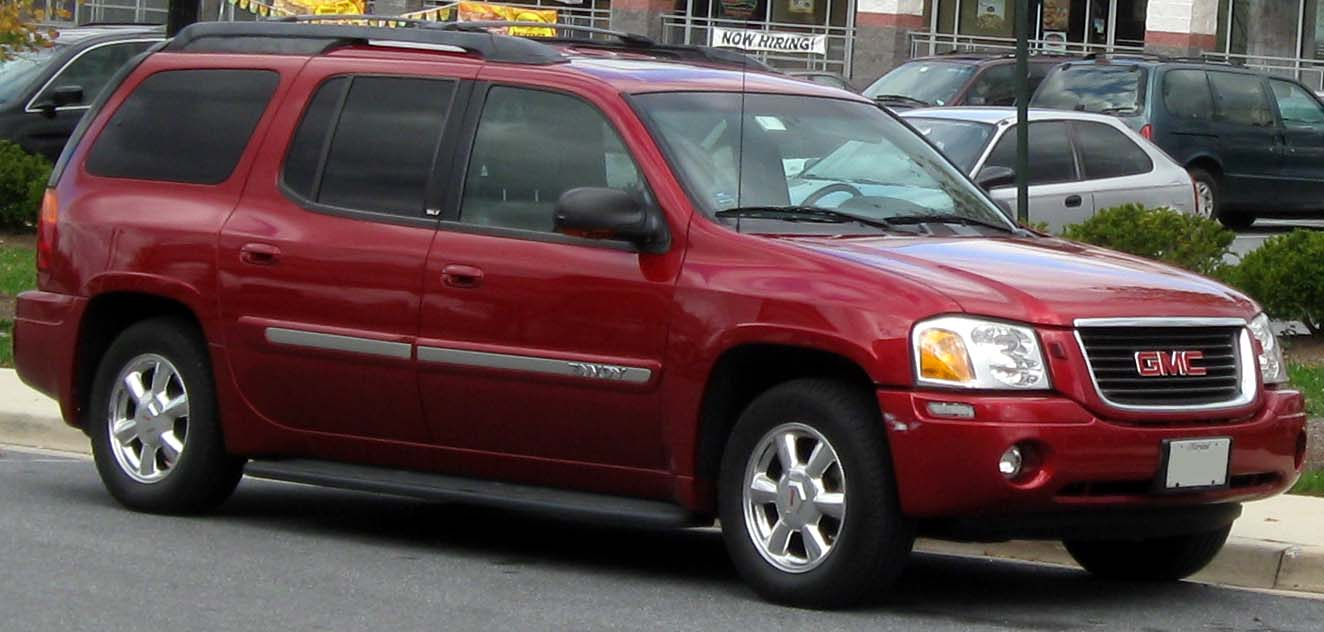
GMC Envoy XL

From 2002 to 2006, GMC offered the extended-wheelbase Envoy XL SUV. Sixteen inches longer in wheelbase and length than the standard-length Envoy, the longer body of the XL was designed for third-row seating. To improve access and rear-seat room, the roofline over the third-row seat was raised (shrouded slightly with a standard roof rack).

Extended to a 129-inch wheelbase, the Envoy XL was only one inch shorter than the full-size Yukon XL (Chevrolet Suburban) in wheelbase, conceding to its full-size counterparts in width. The Envoy XL (also produced as a Chevrolet TrailBlazer EXT and Isuzu Ascender) served as the basis of the GMC Envoy XUV (see below).

Following the closure of the Oklahoma City Assembly facility, the Envoy XL was dropped from the model line, with its 7-passenger midsize role largely replaced by the GMC Acadia CUV wagon.

==== Envoy XUV ====
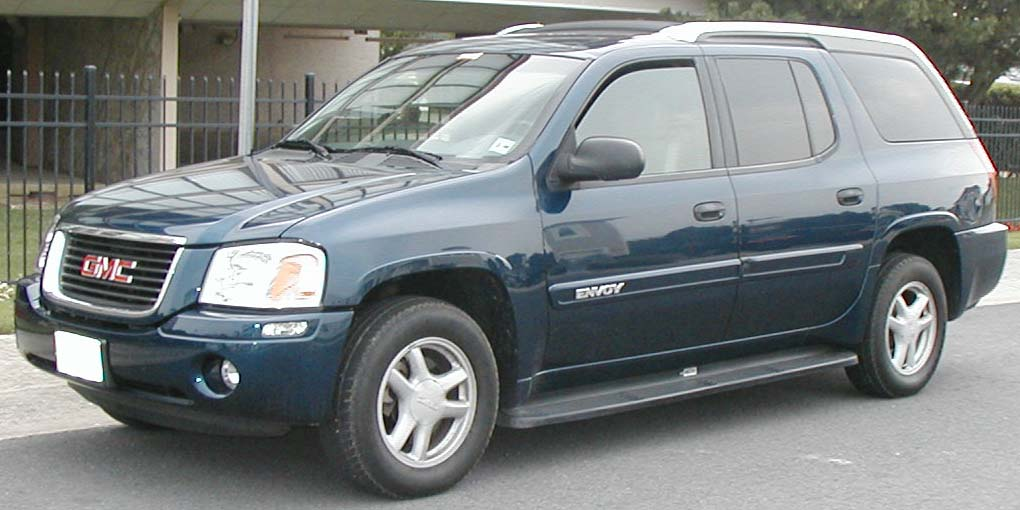
GMC Envoy XUV

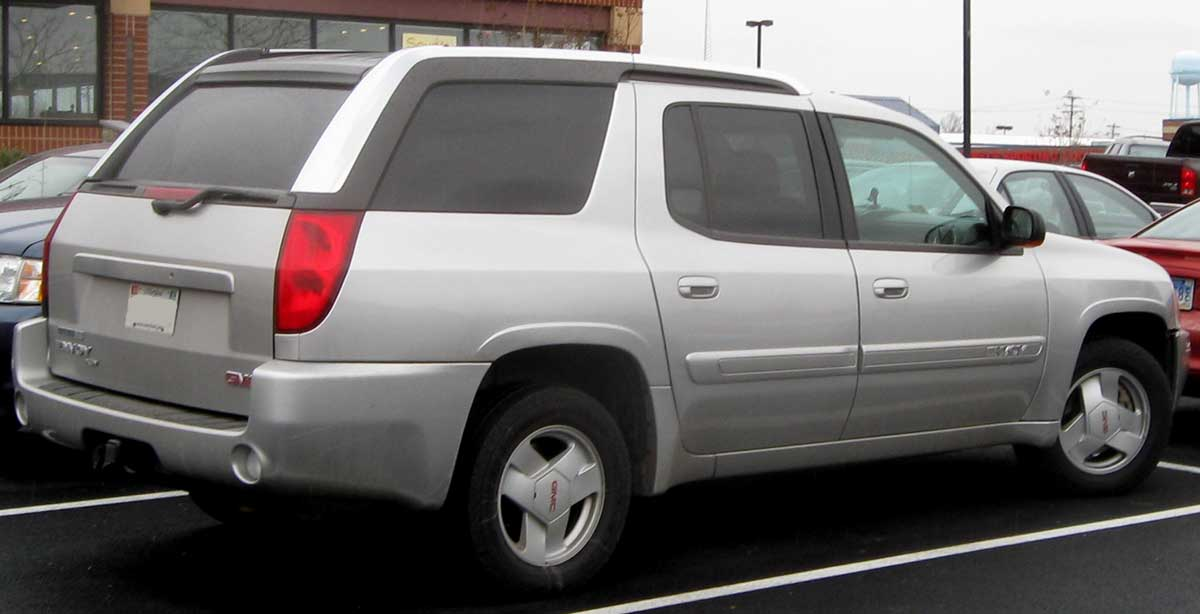
GMC Envoy XUV rear

For 2004 and 2005, GMC offered the five-passenger Envoy XUV retractable-roof vehicle. Similar in concept to the 2001 GMC Terracross (a mid-size SUV concept), the Envoy XUV modernized the retractable roof concept of the 1960s Studebaker Wagonaire. To reconfigure the interior cargo space, the XUV was fitted with a "midgate" (similar to the Chevrolet Avalanche). Derived from the long-wheelbase chassis of the Envoy XL, the Envoy XUV design was exclusive to GMC.

Externally, the vehicle was distinguished by large chrome rails above the cargo area (housing the retractable rear roof) and variant-specific taillamps. In place of the liftgate, a two-way tailgate was used (side-hinged or bottom hinged) with a retractable rear window.

Selling far under sales projections, GM ended sales of the XUV before the end of the 2005 model year.

===== Cargo configuration =====
Marketed by its ability to combine the cargo-carrying aspects of both SUVs and pickup trucks, the Envoy XUV used the midgate to partition the passenger compartment from the rear cargo area (replacing the third-row seating of the XL). The cargo compartment was plastic-lined, allowing it to be hosed clean (with an onboard drainage system). To accommodate tall cargo, the rear roof panel could be retracted forward; to increase the size of the cargo compartment, the midgate and rear seats were folded down, creating a flat, plastic-lined floor (other bulky cargo could be transported by retracting the rear window or lowering the tailgate).

== Discontinuation ==
The Envoy (along with the Chevrolet TrailBlazer, Buick Rainier, Isuzu Ascender, and Saab 9-7X) were discontinued by GM during the 2009 model year. On December 23, 2008, Moraine Assembly ended production, with a white GMC Envoy as its final vehicle. The closing of the last factory that manufactured the trucks was the subject of a 2009 HBO documentary: The Last Truck: Closing of a GM Plant.

While Chevrolet revived the TrailBlazer nameplate as both an SUV and as a compact CUV; neither vehicle has been produced with a GMC counterpart (the Envoy nameplate remains retired).

Calendar year	US Sales
2001	51,208
2002	110,720
2003	127,782
2004	134,897
2005	107,862
2006	74,452
2007	48,586
2008	23,876
2009	4,857
Total	684,240
