= Buick Rainier =

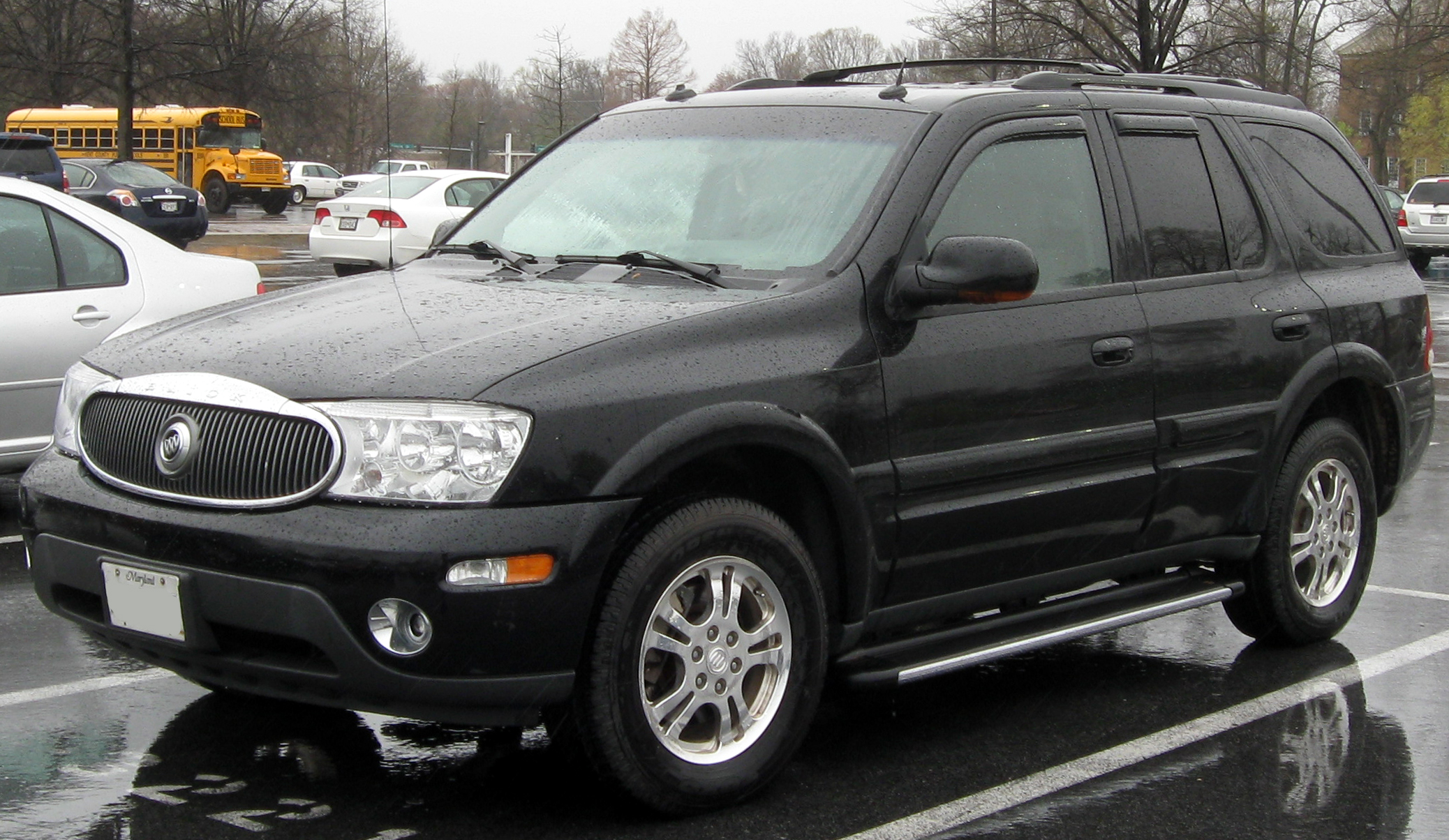

Overview
- Manufacturer: Buick (General Motors)
- Production: July 2003–June 2007
- Model years: 2004–2007
- Assembly: United States: Moraine, Ohio (Moraine Assembly)
- Designer: Bill Davis

Body and chassis
- Class: Mid-size luxury SUV
- Layout: Front engine, rear-wheel drive / four-wheel drive
- Platform: GMT360
- Chassis: Body-on-frame
- Related: Chevrolet TrailBlazer; Chevrolet SSR; GMC Envoy; Isuzu Ascender; Oldsmobile Bravada; Saab 9-7X

Powertrain
- Engine: 4.2 L Vortec 4200 I6; 5.3 L Vortec 5300 V8
- Transmission: 4-speed 4L60-E automatic

Dimensions
- Wheelbase: 113.0 in (2,870 mm)
- Length: 2004–05: 191.8 in (4,872 mm); 2006–07: 193.4 in (4,912 mm)
- Width: 75.4 in (1,915 mm)
- Height: 74.5 in (1,892 mm)

Chronology
- Predecessor: Oldsmobile Bravada
- Successor: Buick Enclave

The Buick Rainier is a mid-size luxury SUV that was manufactured by General Motors and marketed by Buick for the 2004 to 2007 model years. It was named after Mount Rainier, and with the Saab 9-7X served as the replacement for the Oldsmobile Bravada.

== History ==
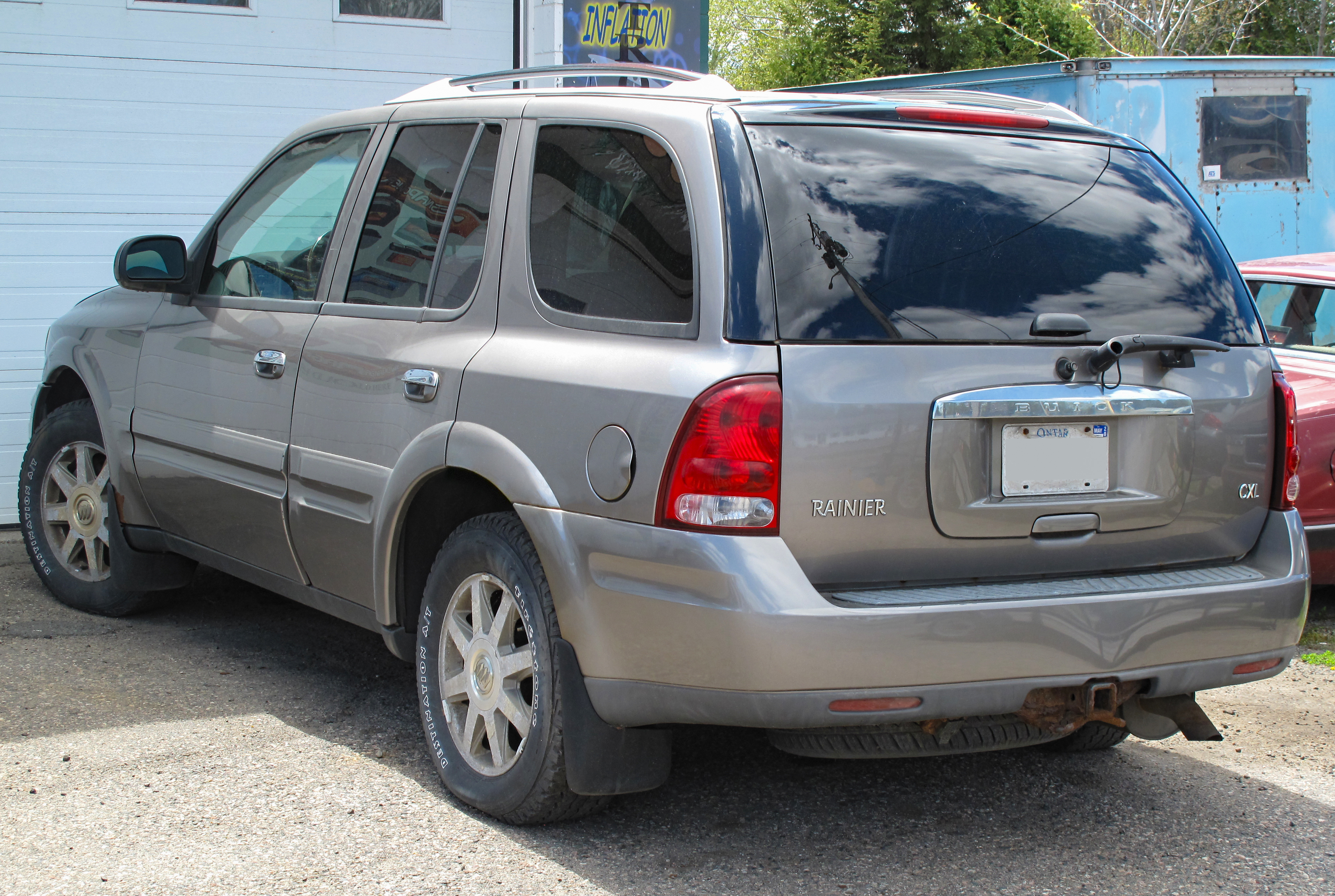
Rear view

Built on the GMT360 platform, the Rainier was introduced on July 28, 2003, for the 2004 model year, in a 5-door, 5-passenger configuration, and was the first short-wheelbase GMT360 to offer a V8. Both rear and all-wheel drive models were offered. It was built in the Moraine Assembly plant in Moraine, Ohio along with other GMT3600 vehicles.

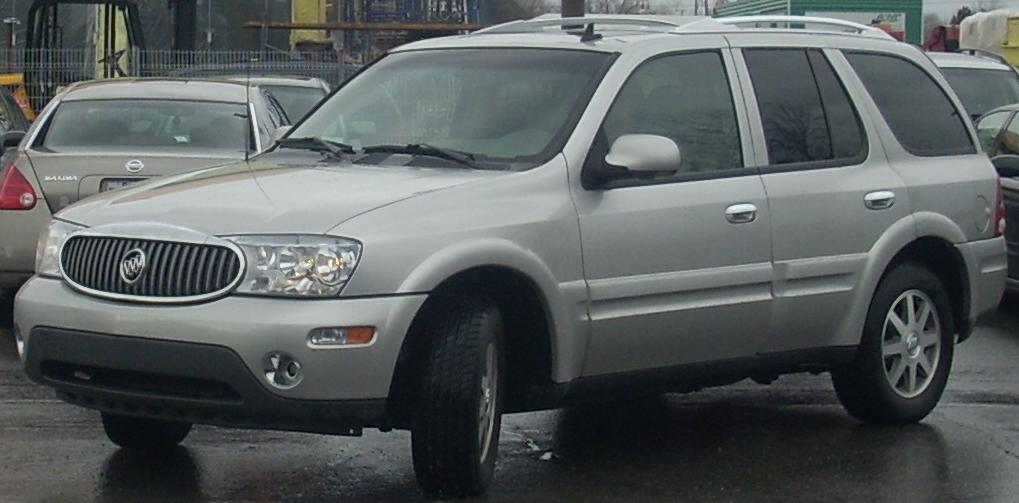
2006–2007 Buick Rainier

Buick also debuted the QuietTuning sound insulation on the Rainier, where a vehicle's sound dampening featured triple door seals, side acoustic laminate glass (the first vehicle to do so), and thicker sound-absorbing pads on the hood and firewall.

The Rainier was discontinued after the 2007 model year and was replaced by the Buick Enclave in 2008. GM ended production of the related Chevrolet TrailBlazer, GMC Envoy, and Saab 9-7X after the 2009 model year.

The Insurance Institute for Highway Safety (IIHS) gave the 2004 Rainier an overall Marginal score for front impacts while the 2005 and newer models are given an Acceptable score. In side impacts the Rainier was given an overall Marginal score with side airbags present.

== 2004 ==
The Rainier debuted in July 2003 as a 2004 model year vehicle. The body of the Rainier/9-7X is largely carried over from the Bravada, only the front sheetmetal and taillights differ from the Bravada.The Rainier, along with the Bravada and 9-7X, did not receive a GMT370 extended wheelbase version, and was therefore only available as a 5-passenger configuration for its entirety.

The Rainier's interior and options list was directly carried over from the Bravada, with only a silver faced gauge cluster with ice blue needles (and a cluster font similar to the Rendezvous CUV,) along with a Buick Tri-Shield emblem adorning the steering wheel. Seat-mounted side impact airbags are optional.

Trim levels for 2004 included the CXL and CXL Plus. A touchscreen DVD-based navigation system was also available with the CXL Plus package. The 5.3 V8 was also available with the "V8 Power Play" package, which added a "V8" designation to the "RAINIER" script on the left side tailgate.

The Rainier debuted with a standard Vortec LL8 4.2 L (254 cu in) straight-six engine producing 275 hp (205 kW), and an optional Vortec LM4, a 5.3 L (325 cu in) V8 producing 290 hp (216 kW). The Rainier was the first short-wheelbase GMT360 to use the 5.3 V8 option, the V8 was previously only available in the extended GMT370 variant. The only available transmission was the four-speed 4L60-E automatic transmission.

== 2005 ==
The CXL Plus package was renamed Sun, Sound, and Entertainment package for 2005. The Tri-Shield emblem on the front grille was updated. Revised interior appointments were added, including a revised steering wheel with wood trimmed accents and chrome Buick Tri-Shield jewelry, revised leather shift knob with wood trim, and new blackface gauges with chrome trim rings and updated font. Power adjustable pedals are now an available option. The Voice Memo Travel Recorder was dropped, and the optional seat-mounted side airbags were replaced with standard side curtain airbags.

The Generation III LM4 was replaced with the Generation IV LH6 V8 for 2005. The new V8 featured Active Fuel Management and had an increased output to 300 hp (224 kW).

== 2006 ==
For 2006, StabiliTrak Control System with built-in traction control, OnStar, and auto-dimming interior rearview mirror are standard equipment.

The output of the LL8 six-cylinder base option increased to 291 horsepower.

== 2007 ==
The final model year was a carryover from 2006, with no revisions made.

== Sales ==
Calendar year	US Sales
2003	4,797
2004	24,134
2005	15,271
2006	12,691
2007	4,819
2008	117
Total	49,138

== Recall ==
In 2012, General Motors had recalled more than 258,000 SUVs in the U.S. and Canada to fix short-circuits in power window and door lock switches that could cause fires. The recall covered Chevrolet TrailBlazer, GMC Envoy, Buick Rainier, Isuzu Ascender, and Saab 9-7X SUVs from the 2006 to the 2007 model years. The SUVs were sold or registered in 20 U.S. states, Washington, D.C., and in Canada, where salt and other chemicals are used to clear roads in the winter.
