= Saab 9-7X =

Mid-size luxury SUV

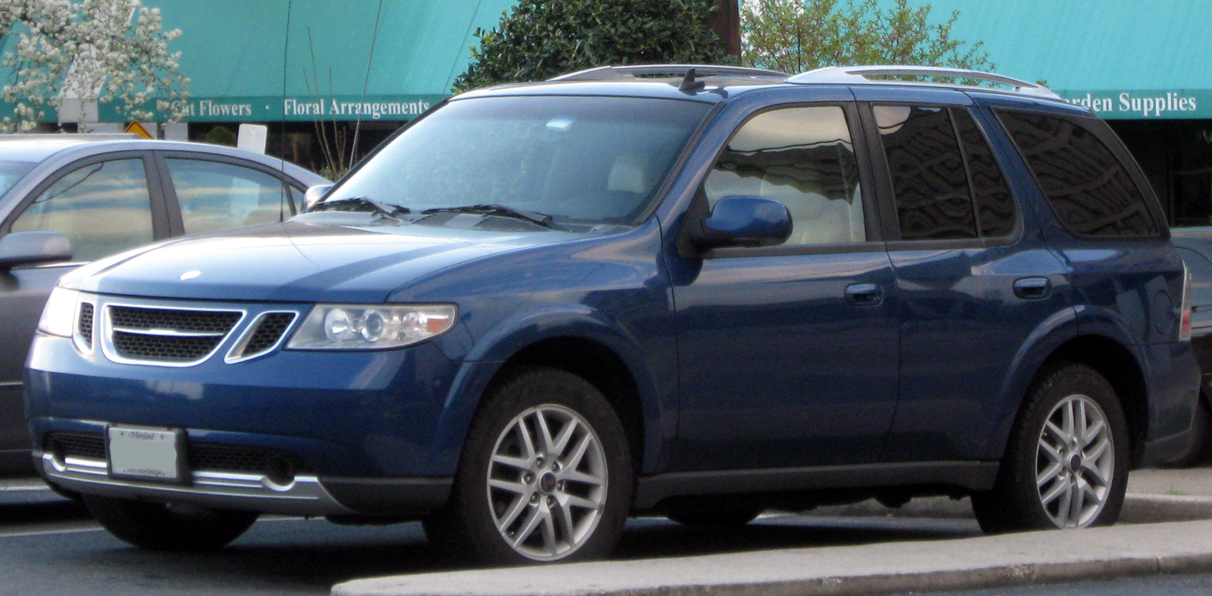

Overview
- Manufacturer: General Motors
- Production: 2004–2008
- Model years: 2005–2009
- Assembly: United States: Moraine, Ohio (Moraine Assembly)

Body and chassis
- Class: Mid-size luxury SUV
- Body style: 4-door SUV
- Layout: Front engine, all-wheel drive
- Platform: GMT360
- Chassis: Body-on-frame
- Related: Buick Rainier; Chevrolet TrailBlazer; GMC Envoy; Oldsmobile Bravada; Isuzu Ascender; Chevrolet SSR

Powertrain
- Engine: 4.2 L Vortec LL8 I6; 5.3 L Vortec LH6 V8; 6.0 L LS2 V8
- Transmission: 4-speed automatic 4L60-E (4.2L Linear, 5.3L Arc) and 4L70-E (Aero only, 6.0L)

Dimensions
- Wheelbase: 113.0 in (2,870 mm)
- Length: 193.2 in (4,907 mm)
- Width: 75.5 in (1,918 mm)
- Height: 68.5 in (1,740 mm)

Chronology
- Predecessor: Oldsmobile Bravada
- Successor: Saab 9-4X

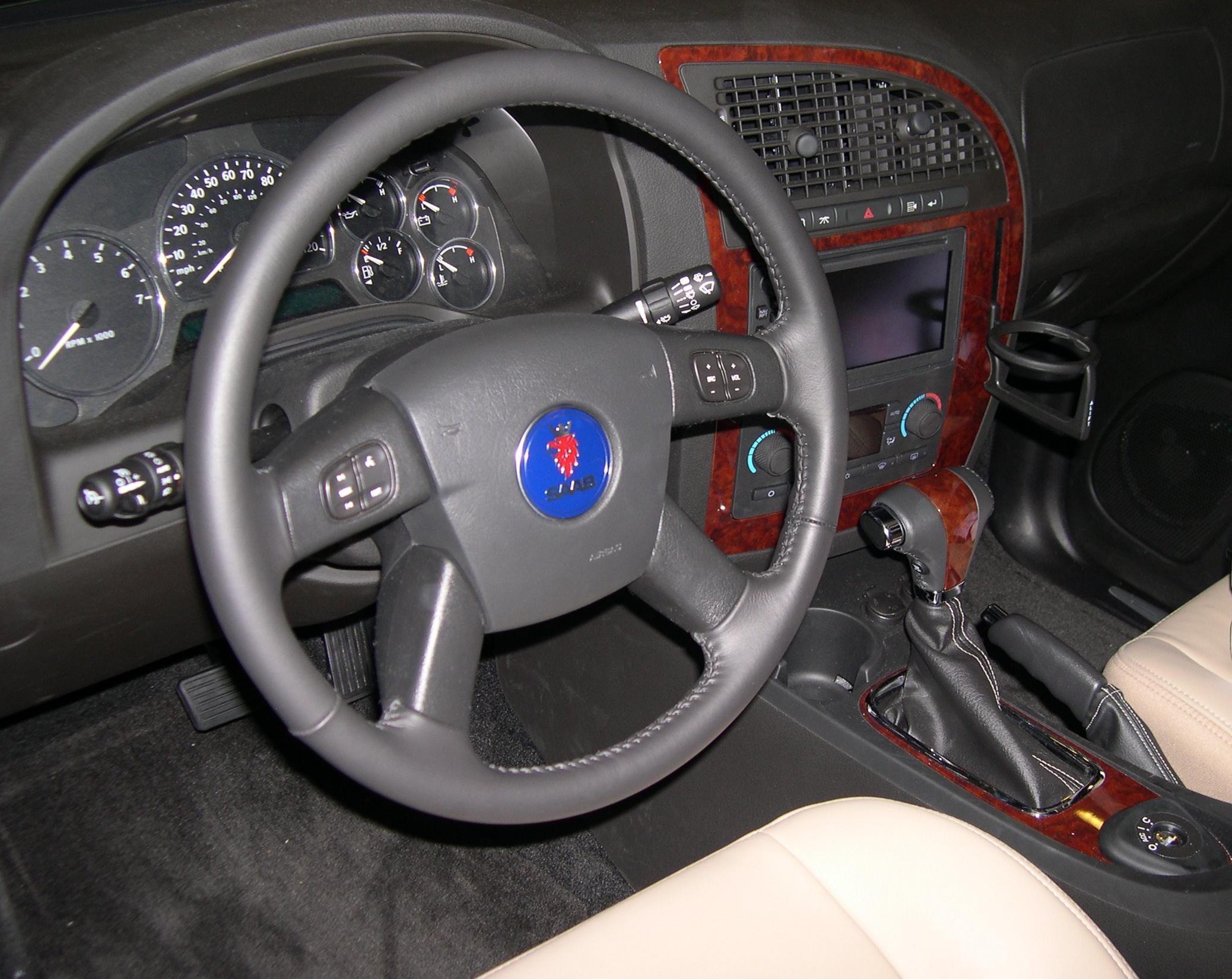
Interior of the 2007 Saab 9-7X showing the Saab style dashboard, cup holder, and ignition key location, also with optional navigation system

The Saab 9-7X is a mid-size luxury SUV that was manufactured by General Motors for the American market and marketed under the Saab marque, then owned by GM. The 9-7X was first presented at the 2004 New York International Auto Show, and was available starting with the 2005 model year, as a replacement for the Oldsmobile Bravada.

== Information and vehicle details ==
The Saab 9-7X was introduced in 2004 for the 2005 model year and was made by General Motors, and the 9-7X was also built on the GMT360 platform, which is the same platform that the Chevrolet TrailBlazer, GMC Envoy, Isuzu Ascender, Oldsmobile Bravada, and Buick Rainier were all built on. The 9-7X was Saab's first-ever SUV and was soon nicknamed 'Trollblazer' by Saab aficionados.

The Saab 9-7X was originally available in two trim levels for 2005: the Linear and the Arc. The Saab 9-7X did not offer a turbocharged engine, quite unusual for a Saab vehicle. All Saab 9-7X vehicles come with all wheel drive (2005 was the first year all wheel drive was offered by Saab), eighteen inch sport wheels, and sport tuned suspension as standard equipment. The 9-7X was built at GM's Moraine, Ohio assembly plant. The Saab 9-7X is classified as a midsize luxury SUV.

When the 2005 Saab 9-7X had been introduced, it had served as the replacement for the Oldsmobile Bravada (which was discontinued as a direct result of the Oldsmobile brand being discontinued in 2004), along with the Buick Rainier. Most of the exterior styling on the Saab 9-7X and on the Buick Rainier was a direct transfer from the discontinued Bravada, except for a front fascia designed to resemble other Saab vehicles.

From 2005 to 2009, the Saab 9-7X was the second most expensive luxury SUV made by General Motors, the most expensive being the Cadillac Escalade. GM had marketed the Saab 9-7X as a direct competitor to more upmarket luxury SUVs, like the Volvo XC90 and the Volkswagen Touareg.

All Saab 9-7X models came standard with side curtain airbags, leather interior, heated front seats, automatic climate control, an AM/FM radio with a CD player and Bose speakers, as well as XM Satellite Radio, and OnStar. HomeLink was standard as well. All Saab 9-7X vehicles came with all-wheel drive as standard equipment. A touchscreen navigation system was available as an optional feature.

For the 2006 model year, the Linear trim level was renamed as the 4.2i, and the Arc trim level was renamed as the 5.3i. The 4.2i trim level comes with the 4.2L inline six engine, and was rated at 285 hp (213 kW) and 276 lb⋅ft (374 N⋅m) of torque. The 5.3L V8 engine was rated at an estimated 300 hp (224 kW) and 330 lb⋅ft (447 N⋅m) of torque.

The Saab 9-7X equipped with the 5.3L V8 engine has the capability to tow up to 6,500 lb (2,948 kg).

For the 2008 model year, the new Aero trim level was added as a more luxurious version of the Chevrolet Trailblazer SS. Both came with the 6.0L LS2 V8 engine, the same engine used in the 2005 to 2007 model of the Chevrolet Corvette modified for use in GMT360 vehicles, producing 390 hp (291 kW) and 400 lb⋅ft (542 N⋅m) of torque. The Saab 9-7X also came with a 4L60E four speed automatic transmission as standard equipment.

Also for the 2008 model year, the Saab 9-7X with the 5.3L V8 engine was available with Displacement on Demand technology to reduce fuel consumption. Saab had made enhancements to the vehicle's GM made chassis. Saab had also added a lower ride height, firmer springs and shock absorbers, larger brakes with steel front calipers, a strengthened frame, steering revisions and a thicker front stabilizer bar.

A self leveling rear air suspension was also added. The 9-7X, along with the other GM midsize SUVs built on GM's GMT360 platform were originally scheduled to be redesigned for the model year of 2007, but instead, GM had decided to continue the production the GMT360 SUVs and to only give them minor updates.

The 9-7X as well as the other GMT360 midsize SUVs made by GM were not scheduled to be redesigned, updated, or to continue production after the 2009 model year, as a result of GM closing their Moraine, Ohio assembly plant, where the GMT360 SUVs were built on December 23, 2008. As a result, the Saab 9-7X was discontinued after the 2009 model year.

=== Yearly production ===
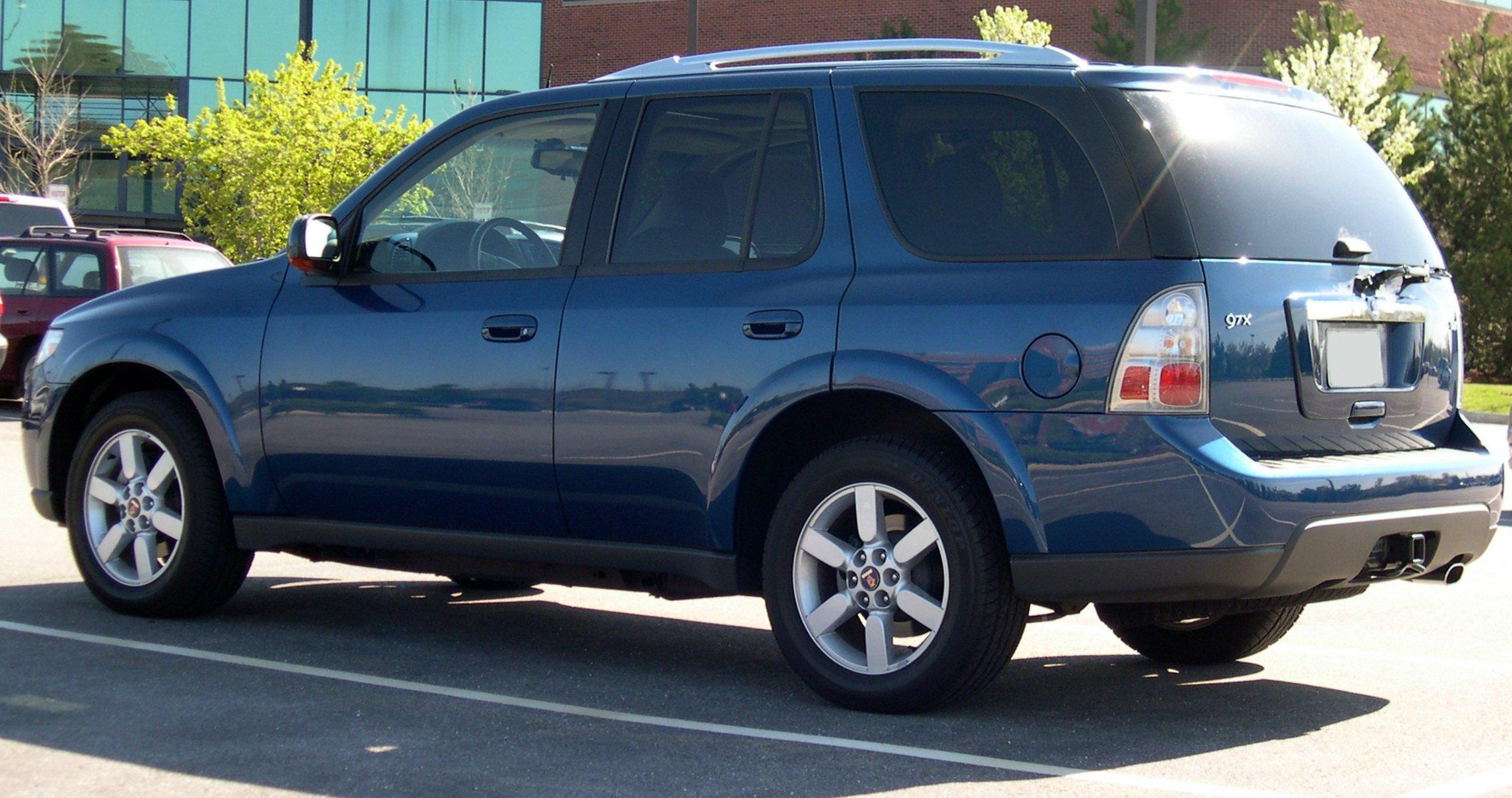
Rear view of 2005 Saab 9-7X "Arc" in "Ocean Blue" Metallic

Model year	Number produced
2005	1,999
2006	5,486
2007	5,060
2008	4,247
2009	2,494
Total	19,286

== Markets ==
Although the Saab 9-7X was developed for the North American market, the model was also sold in other countries, including Chile, Estonia, Greece, Hungary, Italy, the Netherlands, the Middle East, Sweden and Syria.

== Recall ==
In August 2012, General Motors recalled more than 258,000 SUVs in the United States and Canada to fix short circuits in power window and door lock switches that could cause fires. The recall covered Chevrolet TrailBlazer, GMC Envoy, Buick Rainier, Isuzu Ascender and Saab 9-7X SUVs from the model years of 2006 and 2007. The SUVs were sold or registered in twenty states in the United States, Washington D.C. and in Canada.

Recalls were made due to fire in vehicles. Moisture entered through the door and caused the issue. In 2008, the electrical system in the doors were covered in plastic to protect them.

In 2014 GM cancelled previous safety recall 12180 regarding window switch short circuit and or fire. A new recall was issued #14309A: Product Safety - Driver Door Switch Short Circuit. All sealed/repaired switches shall be replaced with new updated switch/door module. All remaining original switches shall be replaced with new updated switch/door module. This is still a valid safety recall and has no expiration date. Reference General Motors Bulletin Document ID: 4036393 or GM safety recall #14309A, SAAB recall #15034
