= GM 4L60-E transmission =

Series of Transmissions from GM

4L60E/4L65E

Overview
- Manufacturer: General Motors
- Production: 1992–2013

Body and chassis
- Class: 4-speed longitudinal automatic transmission

Chronology
- Predecessor: Turbo-Hydramatic 700R4
- Successor: 6L 80 · 6L 90

The 4L60E (and similar 4L65E) is a series of automatic transmissions from General Motors. Designed for longitudinal engine configurations, the series includes 4 forward gears and 1 reverse gear. The 4L60E is the electronically-commanded evolution of the 4L60, which in it of itself is an evolution of the Turbo-Hydramatic 700R4, originally produced in 1982.

The 4L60E and 4L65E are built at Toledo Transmission in Toledo, Ohio and have also been built at Romulus Transmission in Romulus, Michigan and Ramos Arizpe, Mexico.

The two transmissions cannot be differentiated from the outside. The 4L65E shares the same exterior parts but have stronger internals such as 5-pinion planets compared to 4 in the 4L60E. 4L60E uses a 6.5-inch depth bell with 6 bolts for non gen 3 LS applications and a 7-inch depth bell with 7 bolts for LS applications. The 4L65E/70E uses a 7-inch depth bell and 7 bolts.

They also have different input shafts and torque converters. 4L60E's uses a 298mm input shaft for non LS and a 300mm input shaft for LS applications. 4L65E/4L70E uses a 300mm input shaft and converter designed for LS applications only.

GM's 4L60-E automatic transmission provides an early example of the company's use of Torx Plus fasteners, dating back to the late 1990s. Versions with a removable bellhousing used these bolts to secure the bellhousing to the main transmission case. A purpose-designed Torx Plus bit, part number 770000-HBK, is available for removing these bolts. Its tighter fit helps prevent damage to the bolt heads and reduces the risk of the bit slipping out during removal.

Gear ratios:

1	2	3	4	R
3.059	1.625	1.000	0.696	2.294

== 4L60 and 4L60-E ==
The TH700R4 was renamed "4L60" (RPO MD8) following the new General Motors naming convention when the electronic version, 4L60E (RPO M30), was phased in as the 4L60 was being phased out. This happened in 1993 for trucks, vans, and SUVs, and 1994 for rear wheel drive passenger cars. In 1996, a bolt-on bell housing was phased in (along with a six-bolt tailhousing) for S-10 Trucks and S-10 Blazers and beginning in 1998 for all other applications. Beginning in 1998 a new 300mm torque converter with improved higher-capacity internals, 300mm-style input shaft, and 300mm style pump was also introduced on models coupled to a Gen III Small Block. The 4L60E is rated to handle up to 360 ft⋅lb (490 N⋅m) of torque. It weighs 133 pounds without transmission fluid.

The 4L60E family of transmissions use 2 shift solenoids, initially called Shift Solenoid A & Shift Solenoid B, later changed to comply with OBD-II (On Board Diagnostics revision 2) regulations to 1-2 Shift Solenoid & 2-3 Shift solenoid. By activating and deactivating the solenoids in a predetermined pattern by the PCM, 4 distinct gear ratios can be achieved. The last 4L60Es were only used in the 2013 GM half-ton vans and half-ton trucks equipped with the 4.3 and 4.8L engines, before being replaced by the 6L80E. The shift solenoid pattern, also sometimes referred to as solenoid firing order, is as follows;

Shift Solenoid Pattern

	1-2 Solenoid	2-3 Solenoid
1st Gear	On	On
2nd Gear	Off	On
3rd Gear	Off	Off
4th Gear	On	Off

While controlled or partially controlled by the Powertrain Control Module (PCM), third gear is used as a failsafe gear and default operating gear during unexpected conditions. Without computer control, the transmission will automatically hydraulically shift from first gear into second gear based on input shaft RPM. Second gear is recommended for starts on snow and ice, as the available torque is lowered thus preventing wheel slip. The police package (9C1) B-body cars featured a First Gear Block Out (FGBO) Plate on the transmission housing to prevent drivetrain damage.

== Applications ==
- Buick Rainier, 2004–2007
- Buick Roadmaster, 1994–1996
- Cadillac Escalade, 1999–2006
- Cadillac Fleetwood, 1994–1996
- Chevrolet Astro, 1993–2005
- Chevrolet Avalanche, 2002–2008
- Chevrolet S-10 Blazer, 1993–2005
- Chevrolet Camaro, 1994–2002
- Chevrolet Caprice, 1994–1996
- Chevrolet Caprice, 1999–2006
- Chevrolet Caprice, 2007–2010
- Chevrolet C/K 1500/2500 (2500 with six-bolt axle pattern), 1993–1999
- Chevrolet Colorado, 2004–2012
- Chevrolet Corvette, 1994–2004
- Chevrolet Express, 1996–2014
- Chevrolet Impala SS, 1994–1996
- Chevrolet S-10, 1993–2004
- Chevrolet Silverado 1500, 1999–2013
- Chevrolet SSR, 2003–2006
- Chevrolet Suburban 1500, 1993–2008
- Chevrolet Tahoe, 1995–2010
- Chevrolet TrailBlazer, 2002–2009
- Chevrolet Van, 1993–1996
- GMC Canyon, 2004–2012
- GMC Envoy, 2003–2009
- GMC Jimmy, 1993–2005
- GMC Safari, 1993–2005
- GMC Savana, 2003–2014
- GMC Sierra 1500/2500 (2500 with six-bolt axle pattern), 1993–2013
- GMC Sonoma, 1993–2004
- GMC Suburban 1500, 1993–1999
- GMC Yukon, 1992–2009
- GMC Yukon XL 1500, 2000–2008
- GMC Vandura, 1993–1996
- Holden Commodore (VR, VS, VT, VX, VY, VZ, VE), 1993–2013
- Holden Monaro, 2001–2006
- Holden Caprice (VR, VS, WH, WK, WL and WM), 1994–2013
- Hummer H3
- Oldsmobile Bravada
- Pontiac Firebird, 1994–2002
- Pontiac GTO, 2004 only
- Saab 9-7X, 2005–2009
- Isuzu Ascender, 2003–2008

== 4L65E ==
An updated 4L60E, the 4L65E (RPO M32), was phased in the 2001 model year when coupled behind the 6.0 Vortec. Five-pinion front and rear planetaries, along with an additional 3/4 clutch allowing 7 clutches in the input housing and induction hardened input shaft assembly, were improved to withstand up to 380 ft⋅lb (520 N⋅m) of torque.

Applications:

- Cadillac Escalade
- Cadillac Escalade EXT
- Chevrolet Corvette, 2005 only
- Chevrolet Silverado SS
- GMC Sierra Denali
- GMC Yukon Denali
- Holden Commodore, VZ 6.0 only
- Holden Crewman, 2004 only
- Holden One Tonner, 2004 only
- HSV Clubsport VZ
- Hummer H2
- Pontiac GTO, 2005–2006 (M32, 3.46:1 final drive)

== See also ==
- List of GM transmissions
