= GMT360 =

GMT 360
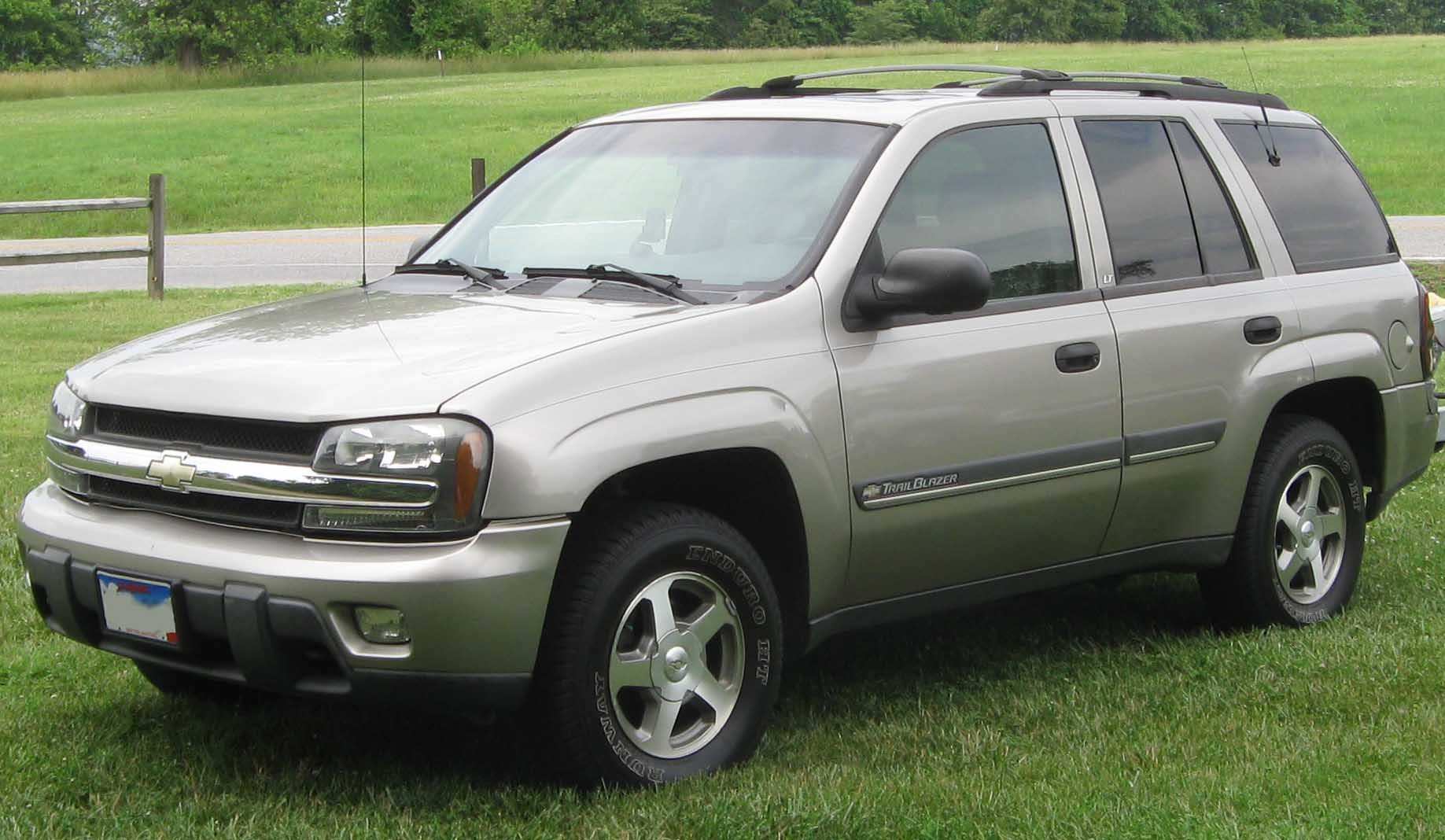
- Chevrolet TrailBlazer

Overview
- Manufacturer: General Motors
- Also called: GMT 305; GMT 368; GMT 370
- Production: 2001–2009
- Assembly: Moraine, Ohio (GMT 360); Oklahoma City, Oklahoma (GMT 370); Lansing Craft Center (GMT 368)

Body and chassis
- Class: Mid-size SUV (TrailBlazer, Envoy, Ascender); Mid-size luxury SUV (Rainier, Bravada, 9-7X); Pickup truck (SSR)
- Layout: Front engine, rear-wheel drive / all-wheel drive
- Body styles: 5-door wagon; 5-door retractable-roof wagon (XUV); 2-door convertible pickup truck (SSR)
- Vehicles: Buick Rainier; Chevrolet SSR; Chevrolet TrailBlazer (EXT); GMC Envoy (XL, XUV); Isuzu Ascender (EXT); Oldsmobile Bravada; Saab 9-7X

Powertrain
- Engines: 4.2 L Atlas I6; 5.3 L Vortec V8; 6.0 L LS2 V8
- Transmission: 4L60-E/4L65-E 4-speed automatic

Dimensions
- Wheelbase: 113 in (2,870 mm) (GMT 360); 116 in (2,946 mm) (GMT 368); 129 in (3,277 mm) (GMT 370/305)

Chronology
- Predecessor: GM GMT330 platform
- Successor: GM Theta platform (GMT360); GM Lambda platform (GMT370)

GMT 360 is a vehicle platform that was manufactured by General Motors from the 2002 through 2009 model years. Underpinning the third generation of GM mid-size SUVs, the GMT360 architecture replaced the pickup truck-derived GMT330 chassis introduced for 1983. Vehicles using the platform were produced as five-door SUVs, a retractable-roof wagon/SUV/truck, and a midsize hardtop convertible pickup truck.

The GMT360 architecture is among the most widely rebranded GM platforms in modern history. Alongside its adoption by each GM brand (except Cadillac, Hummer, Pontiac and Saturn), the SUV platform was additionally marketed by associated brand Isuzu. Following the closure of Oldsmobile after the 2004 model year, its version was adopted by the Buick and Saab brands.

Retired after the 2009 model year, the platform was originally slated to be replaced by a successor body-on-frame SUV (codenamed GMT361), with GM instead replacing the GMT360 vehicles with the Theta platform and the long-wheelbase GMT370 replaced by the three-row Lambda platform (which also replaced all GM minivans). The last GMT360 vehicles were assembled on December 23, 2008.

== Chassis overview ==
The first GM SUV platform not derived from pickup trucks, GMT360 retained body-on-frame construction, introducing fully boxed hydroformed frame rails. The wheelbase is 113 inches (6 inches longer than the GMT330), with a 129-inch long-wheelbase variant (designated GMT370). Rear-wheel drive was standard, with part-time four-wheel drive and all-wheel drive as options.

The platform used double wishbone independent suspension in front with a 5-link solid rear axle; auto-leveling air suspension was offered as an option for some versions.

GMT360 vehicles debuted the 4.2L Atlas inline-6 (replacing the 4.3L V6). For 2003, a 5.3L V8 engine was introduced as an option for non-Oldsmobile vehicles, with a 6.0L V8 becoming an option in 2006. The 395hp engine was exclusive to the Chevrolet TrailBlazer SS and the Saab 9-7X Aero. All three engines were coupled to the 4L60-E/4L70-E 4-speed automatic transmission.

== Applications ==
=== GMT 305 ===
- 2004–2005 GMC Envoy XUV

=== GMT 360 ===
- 2002–2009 Chevrolet TrailBlazer
- 2002–2009 GMC Envoy
- 2003–2008 Isuzu Ascender
- 2002–2004 Oldsmobile Bravada
- 2004–2007 Buick Rainier
- 2005–2009 Saab 9-7X

=== GMT 368 ===
- 2003–2006 Chevrolet SSR

=== GMT 370 ===
- 2002–2006 Chevrolet TrailBlazer EXT
- 2002–2006 GMC Envoy XL
- 2003–2007 Isuzu Ascender

== Materials ==
An example of early car recycling processes was seen with the use of Thermoplastic olefin (TPO) that had been recycled from bumpers to create the air intake cowling in these vehicles.

== See also ==
- List of General Motors platforms

== See also ==
- GM GMT platform
