= Toledo Transmission =

General Motors factory in Ohio, US

Coordinates: 41°43′15″N 83°34′43″W

Toledo Propulsion Systems
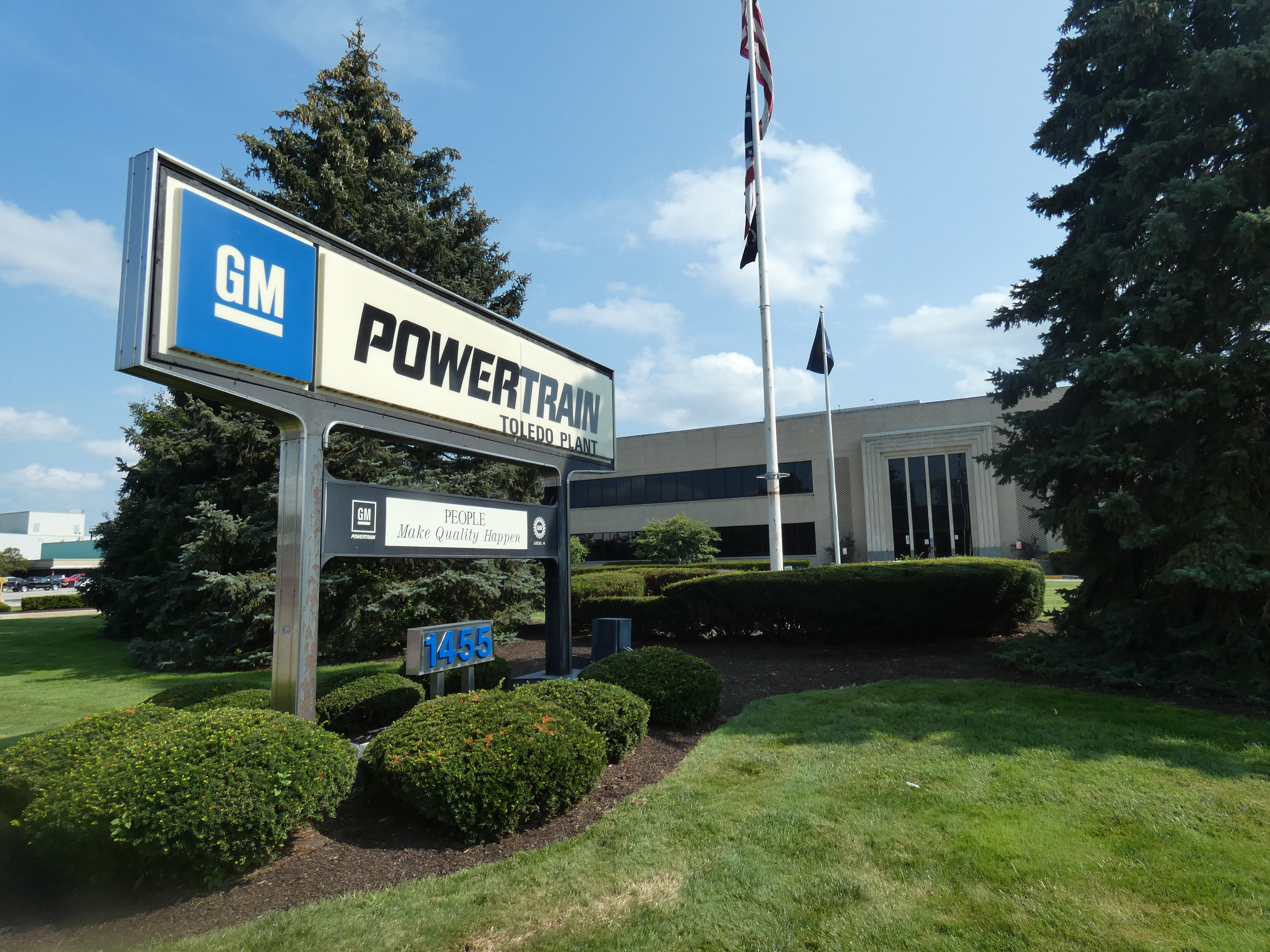
- The front of Toledo Propulsion Systems (legacy signage)
- Formation: 1916; 110 years ago
- Purpose: Production of transmissions for GM
- Location(s): 1455 West Alexis Rd. Toledo, Ohio, U.S.
- Region served: Worldwide
- Parent organization: General Motors
- Staff: 1,749 (2020)
- Website: gm.com

Toledo Propulsion Systems (previously called Toledo Transmission Operations, TTO, and Powertrain Toledo) is a 2.8 million square feet; 151 acres General Motors transmission factory in Toledo, Ohio.

The plant manufactures and assembles GM’s six-speed, eight-speed and ten-speed rear-wheel-drive and nine-speed front-wheel-drive transmissions that are used in a variety of Chevrolet, Buick, GMC and Cadillac vehicles. Hourly employees are represented by UAW Local 14.

== History ==
Toledo Propulsion Systems was founded in 1916, and produced truck transfer cases and transmissions for four and six wheel drive trucks for the military throughout World War II. Today, Toledo Propulsion Systems is North America’s most productive rear-wheel drive transmission plant. Toledo has been ranked No. 1 in the Harbour Report nine of the past twelve years. The rear-wheel drive transmissions built in Toledo are shipped to GM’s assembly plants in Arlington, Texas; Bowling Green, KY; Ft. Wayne, Ind.; Flint, Mich.; Wentzville, Mo. and Oshawa, Ontario. The front-wheel drive transmissions are shipped to Fairfax, Kan.; Lordstown, Ohio; Oshawa, Ontario and soon, Lake Orion, Mich.

Toledo Propulsion Systems began as a Warner Gear plant that was purchased in October 1916 located at 900 W Central Ave Toledo. Toledo has primarily built truck and passenger transmissions throughout its history. The Central Avenue plant continued operations throughout WWII building truck transfer cases and transmissions until a new 414,000 square-foot facility on Alexis Road was acquired from the former Martin-Parry Corporation in 1955. The original Central Avenue facility ceased operations in 1957 when its equipment was transferred to another Chevrolet facility in Muncie, Indiana and the employees moved to the new Alexis Road facility. Since 1956 the current facility has been expanded several times and by 1970 was a 1,034,656 square-foot facility producing the Turbo Hydramatic 3 speed automatic transmission employing over 4000 people. In 1982 the Toledo facility began production of the 700R4 which would later be known as the 4L60E transmission and would produce almost 38,000,000 units before its end of production in 2007 making way for new 6L80 and 6T40 transmission production.

== Investments ==
GM has invested more than $1 billion in the plant since 2011.

Investments include:

- $204 million (2011) – 8-speed (8RWD) transmission program
- $83 million (2011) – 6-speed (GF6) transmission enhancement
- $55.7 million (2013) – increased capacity and tooling for all-new 8-speed (8RWD) and existing 6-speed transmission programs
- $30.6 million (2013) – increased 6-speed (GF6) capacity and tooling
- $667.6 million (2016) – 9-speed (GF9) and 10-speed (AB1V) transmission programs
- $39 million (2020) – upgrade and enhance the production of 8-speed rear-wheel-drive transmission
- $75 million (2021) – increased capacity of HD full-size truck 10-speed transmission

== Products ==
Current Products:

Toledo Transmission Operations provides transmissions to 10 GM facilities within North America (US and Canada).

- RWD 6-speed (6L50/6L80/6L90) – Full-size trucks, G Van (2008)
- RWD 8-speed (8L45/8L90) – Camaro, full-size trucks, mid-size trucks (2013)
- RWD 10-speed (AB1V 10L1000) – Chevrolet Silverado HD and GMC Sierra HD (2019)
- FWD 9-speed (GF9 9T65) – Chevrolet Traverse, Buick Enclave (2018)

Past Products:

- Turboglide (1957-1961)
- Corvair Powerglide (1960-1969)
- THM350 (1969–82)
- 700R4 (1982–90)
- 4L60 (1990–93)
- 4L60-E (1993-2007)
- 4L65-E
- GF6 6T30/40/45 (2011-2019)

=== Product Applications ===
- Hydra-matic 6L80 Rear-Wheel-Drive 6-Speed
  - Chevrolet: Corvette, Camaro, Silverado HD, Tahoe, Suburban, Express.
  - GMC: Sierra HD, Yukon, Yukon XL, Savana.
  - Cadillac: Escalade
- Global Front-Wheel-Drive 6-Speed 6T40
  - Chevrolet: Cruze, Malibu, Equinox, Sonic.
  - Buick: Regal, LaCrosse, Verano.

== Awards ==
- Harbour ReportTM Award winner.
  - 1998, 2000, 2001, 2002, 2003, 2004, 2007, 2008 and 2009
- Chairman’s Honors Award for Harbour Report TM performance
- PMQH Best of the Best.
  - 1998, 2002, 2003, 2004, 2007 and 2009
- GMPT Toledo Achieves Landfill Free Status
  - 2008
- 2012: Silver level award for encouraging environmental excellence from the Ohio EPA
- 2013: Energy Star Challenge for Industry award from the EPA
- 2014:
  - MVP2 Award (Most Valuable Pollution Prevention) from the National Pollution Prevention Roundtable
  - Built-In Quality Level IV Award (GM Internal)
- 2015:
  - Gold Level Award for Encouraging Environmental Excellence from the Ohio EPA
  - Wildlife at Work Gold Level Certification from the Wildlife Habitat Council
- 2016:
  - ISO 14001 Environmental Management System Certification (since 2000)
  - Energy Star Challenge for Industry Achiever Award from the U.S. EPA
- 2017: Gold Level Award for Encouraging Environmental Excellence from the Ohio EPA
- 2018: Platinum Level for Encouraging Environmental Excellence by the Ohio EPA

== Employee Information ==
- Hourly: 1,544
- Salary: 205
- Total: 1749
- Union Local: UAW Local 14

== See also ==
- List of GM factories
