= Isuzu Ascender =

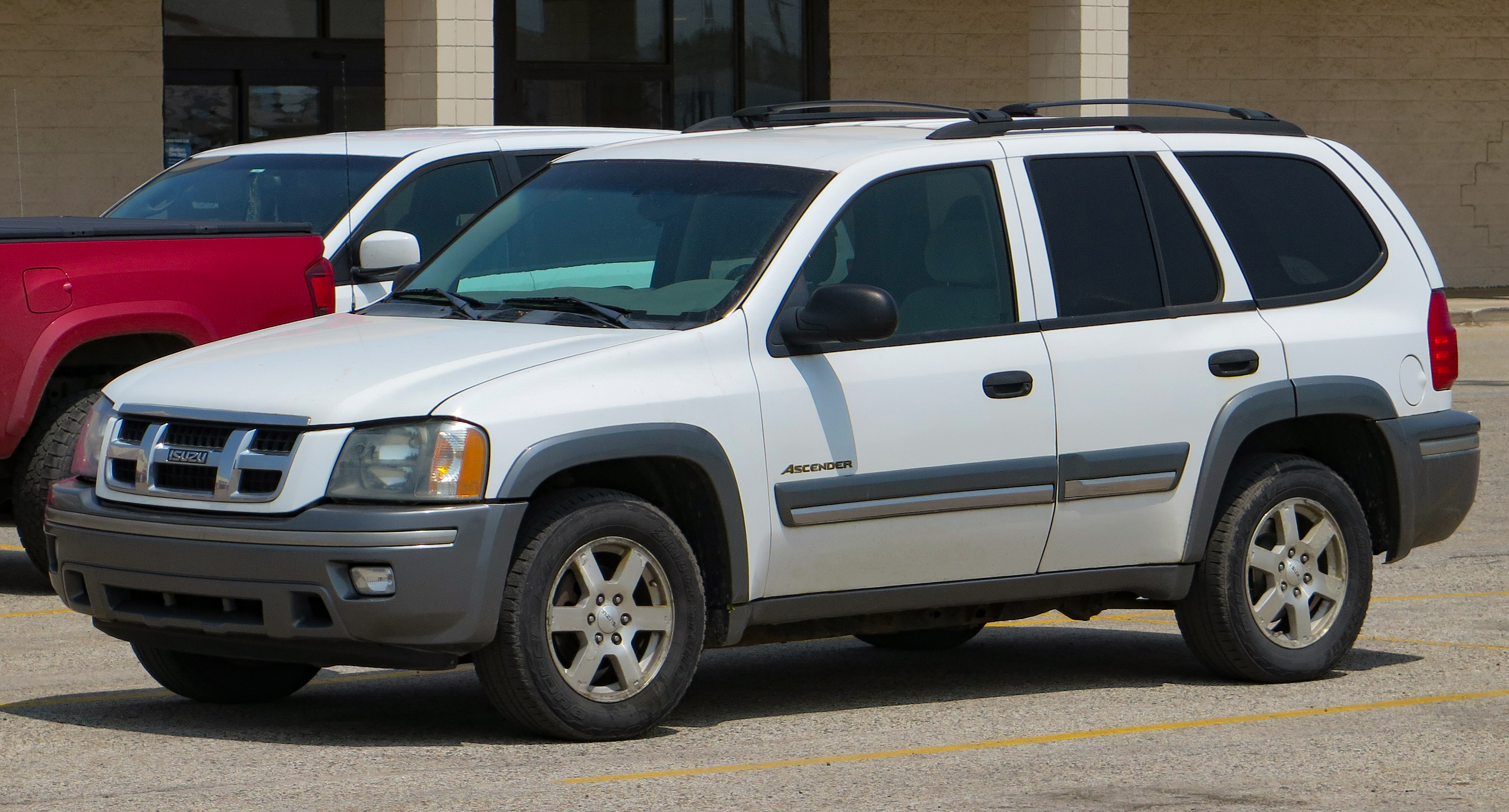

Overview
- Manufacturer: General Motors
- Production: 2002–June 2008
- Model years: 2003–2008
- Assembly: United States: Moraine, Ohio (Moraine Assembly); Oklahoma City, Oklahoma (Oklahoma City Assembly)

Body and chassis
- Class: Mid-size SUV
- Body style: 5-door SUV
- Layout: Front-engine, rear-wheel drive / four-wheel drive
- Platform: GMT360; GMT370 (EXT)
- Chassis: Body-on-frame
- Related: GMC Envoy; Chevrolet TrailBlazer; Buick Rainier; Oldsmobile Bravada; Saab 9-7X; Chevrolet SSR

Powertrain
- Engine: 4.2 L LL8 Vortec DOHC I6; 5.3 L LM4Vortec OHV V8; 5.3 L LH6 Vortec OHV V8
- Transmission: 4-speed automatic

Dimensions
- Wheelbase: 113 in (2,870 mm) (SWB); 129 in (3,277 mm) (LWB)
- Length: 191.6 in (4,867 mm) (SWB); 207.6 in (5,273 mm) (LWB)
- Width: 76.1 in (1,933 mm)
- Height: 71.9 in (1,826 mm) (SWB); 75.5 in (1,918 mm) (LWB)

Chronology
- Predecessor: Isuzu Axiom; Isuzu Rodeo; Isuzu Trooper
- Successor: GMC Terrain

The Isuzu Ascender is a mid-size SUV built by General Motors for Isuzu. The 7-passenger Ascender was introduced for the 2003 model year as a replacement for the Isuzu Trooper. The 5-passenger Ascender was introduced for the 2004 model year as a replacement for the Isuzu Rodeo and the Isuzu Axiom.

As a result of Isuzu withdrawing from Canada after the 2002 model year, this SUV model was sold exclusively in the United States.

== Overview ==
The Ascender is the only one of GM's GMT360-based mid-size SUVs that was not GM-branded. The Ascender LWB was dropped after the 2006 model year. Reviews warned of a thin dealer network for warranty repairs, and the Kelley Blue Book projected a relatively low resale value similar to the TrailBlazer. However, Isuzu offered a seven-year/75,000-mile powertrain warranty as well as substantial factory incentives.

The Ascender ended production on June 6, 2008, as part of Isuzu's withdrawal from the United States market.

Engines:

- 2003–2008 4200 4.2 L (256 in³) LL8 I6
- 2003–2004 5300 5.3 L (323 in³) LM4 V8
- 2005–2007 5300 5.3 L (323 in³) LH6 V8 with Active Fuel Management
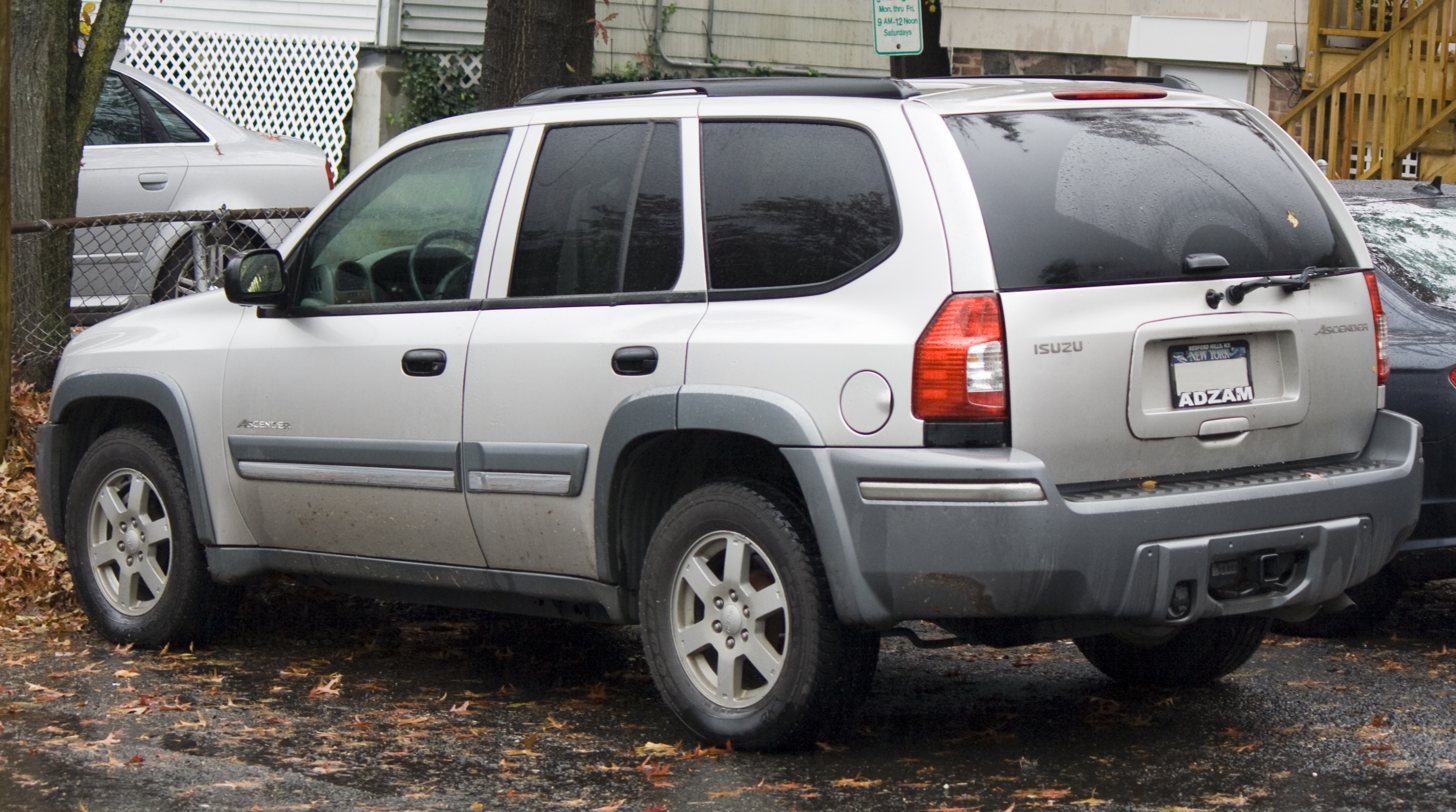
Rear view of five passenger Ascender

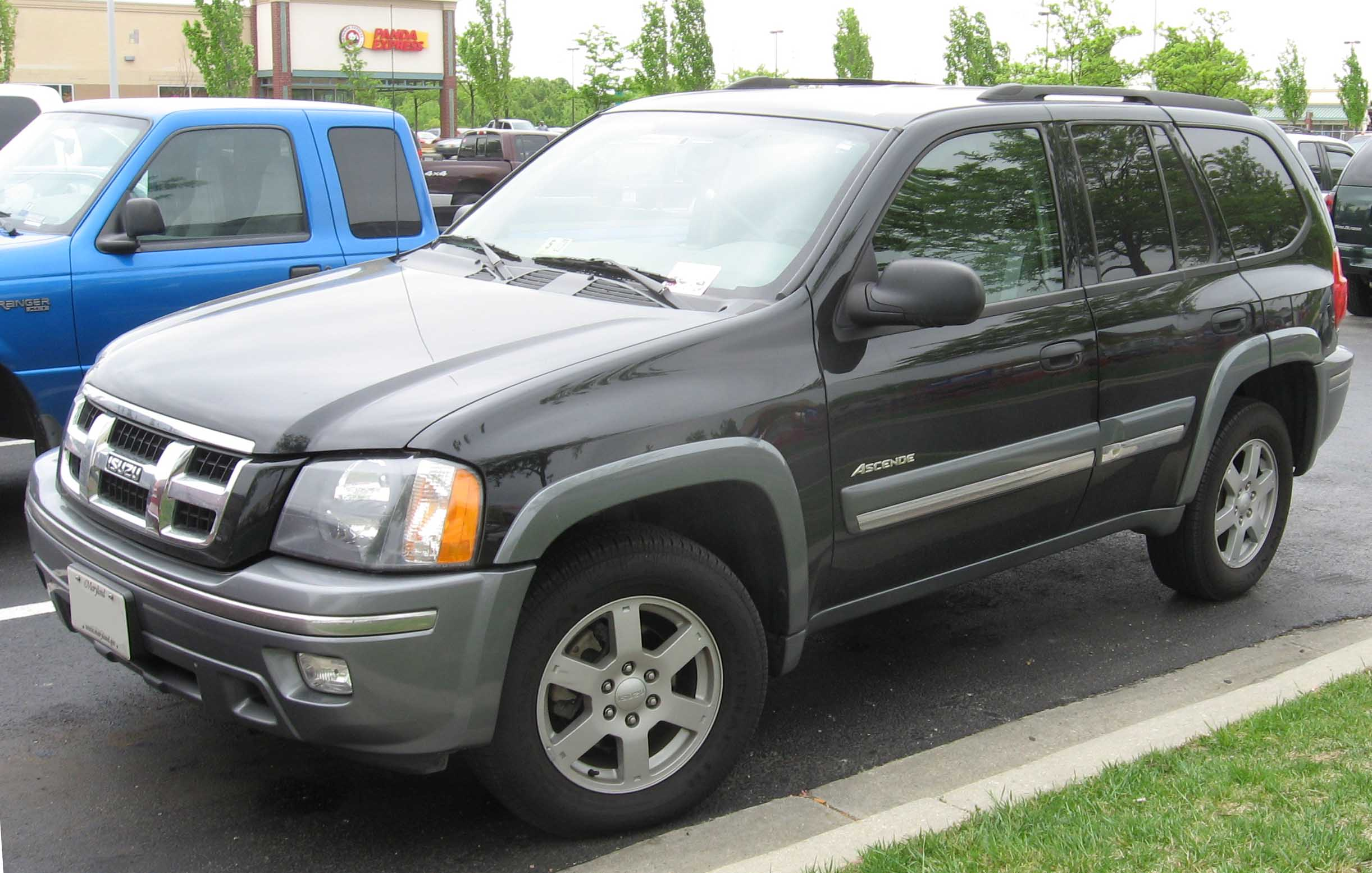
Five-passenger Ascender

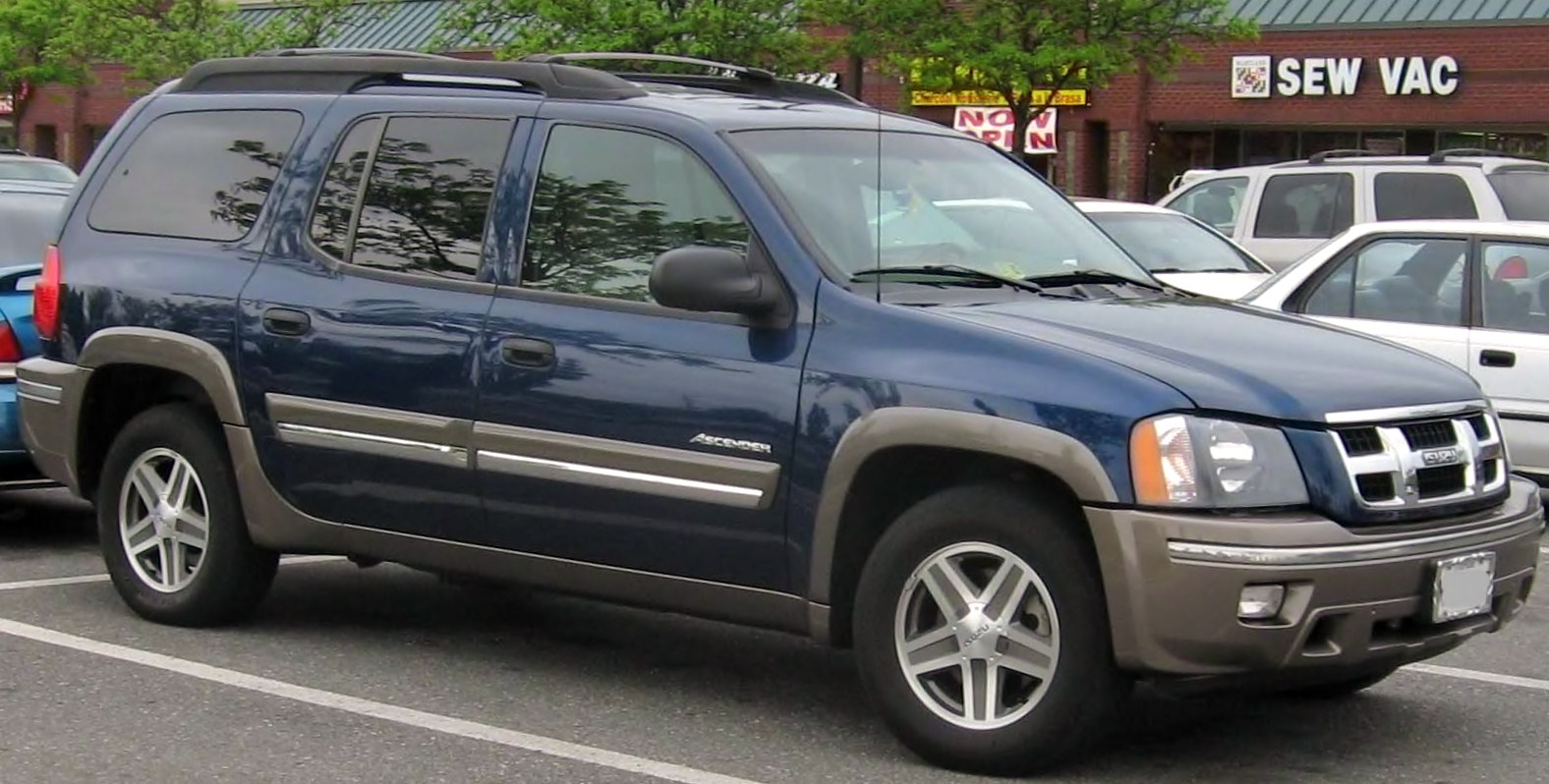
Seven-passenger Ascender

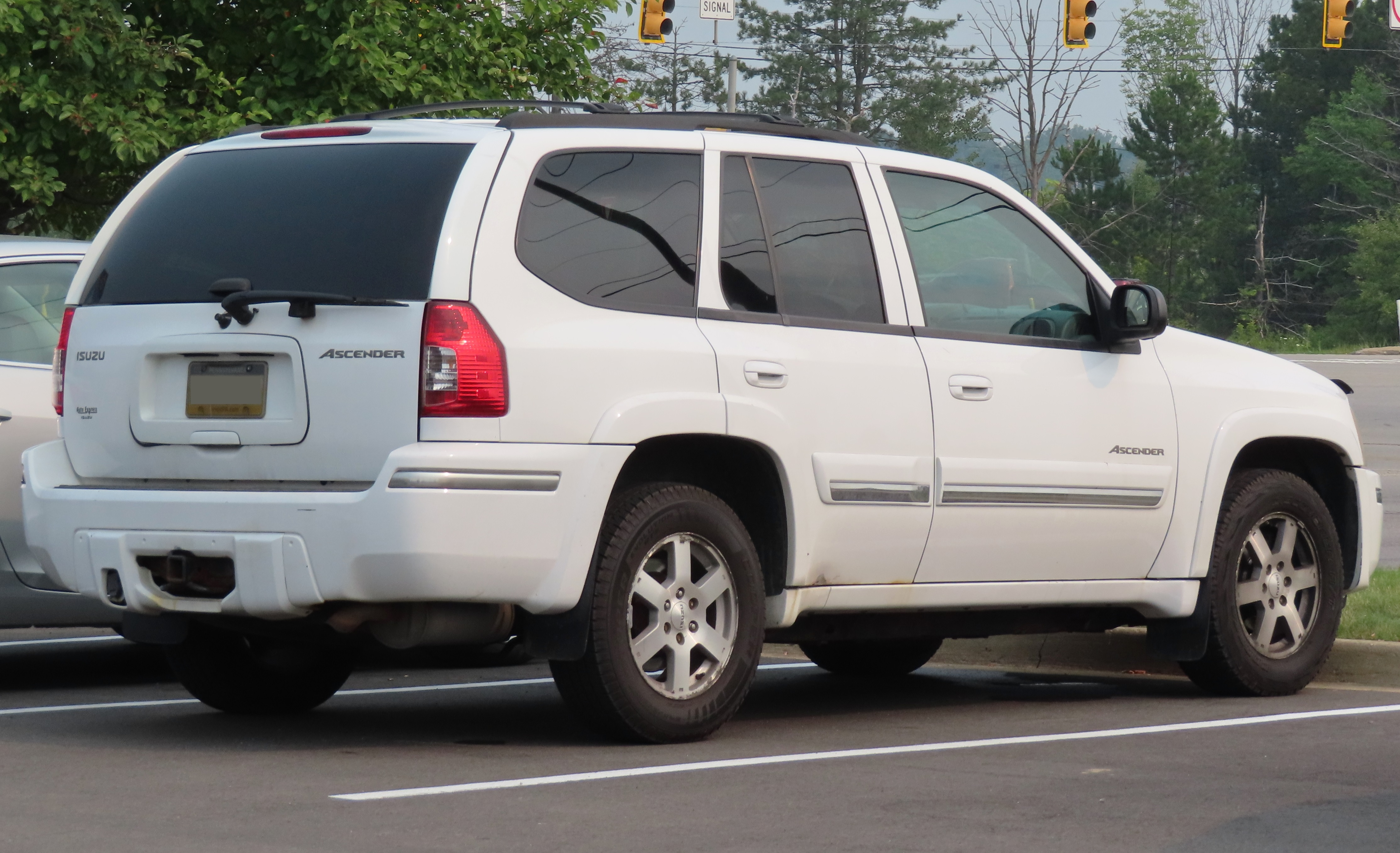
Isuzu Ascender Luxury

== Recall ==
In 2012, General Motors and Isuzu recalled more than 258,000 SUVs in the U.S. and Canada to fix short-circuits in power window and door-lock switches that could cause fires. The recall covered Chevrolet TrailBlazer, GMC Envoy, Buick Rainier, Isuzu Ascender and Saab 9-7X SUVs from the 2006 and 2007 model years. The SUVs were sold or registered in the United States, including Hawaii and Alaska, and Canada.

General Motors announced the recall of 316,357 vehicles in late 2014, primarily in North America, to fix malfunctioning headlights. According to the company, a problem in the headlamp driver module could have led to temporary or permanent malfunctioning of the low-beam headlamps and daytime running lamps. This increased the possibility of an accident. However, the high-beam headlamps, marker lamps, turn signals and fog lamps are not affected by the issue. The vehicles that were covered under the recall are the 2006–2009 Buick LaCrosse sedans; 2006–2007 Chevrolet Trailblazer, GMC Envoy and Buick Rainier SUVs; and 2006–2008 Saab 9-7X and Isuzu Ascender SUVs.
