= General Motors Atlas engine =

General Motors Atlas
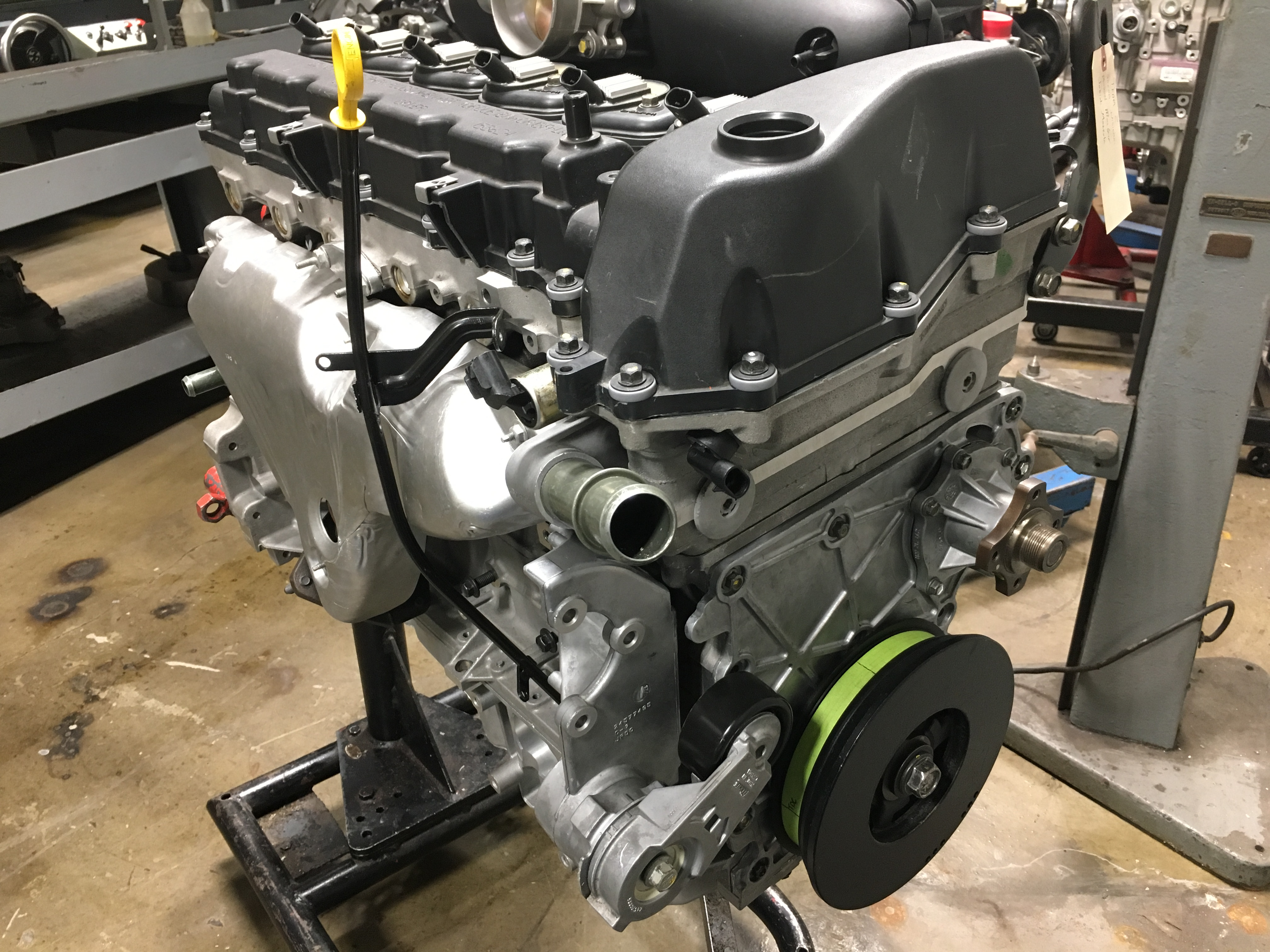

Overview
- Manufacturer: General Motors Corporation
- Also called: Vortec
- Production: 2002–2012

Layout
- Configuration: Straight-4, Straight-5, and Straight-6
- Displacement: 2.8 L (2,770 cc; 169.0 cu in); 2.9 L (2,921 cc; 178.3 cu in); 3.5 L (3,460 cc; 211.1 cu in); 3.7 L (3,653 cc; 222.9 cu in); 4.2 L (4,160 cc; 253.9 cu in)
- Cylinder bore: 93 mm (3.66 in); 95.5 mm (3.76 in)
- Piston stroke: 102 mm (4.02 in)
- Cylinder block material: Aluminum
- Cylinder head material: Aluminum
- Valvetrain: DOHC 4 valves x cyl. with VVT (Exhaust Cam)
- Compression ratio: 10.0:1

RPM range
- Max. engine speed: 6,300 rpm

Combustion
- Fuel system: Multi-point fuel injection
- Fuel type: Gasoline
- Oil system: Wet sump
- Cooling system: Water-cooled

Output
- Power output: 175–291 hp (130–217 kW)
- Torque output: 185–277 lb⋅ft (251–376 N⋅m)

Chronology
- Predecessor: Chevrolet Turbo-Thrift engine; General Motors 122 engine

Atlas is a name for a family of inline piston engines for trucks from General Motors, used in the GMT355 and GMT360 platforms. The series debuted in 2002 with the Oldsmobile Bravada, and is used in the Buick Rainier, the Chevrolet TrailBlazer and Colorado, the GMC Envoy and Canyon, the Hummer H3, Isuzu Ascender and i-370, and the Saab 9-7X. The engines use GM's Vortec name, with straight-4, straight-5, and straight-6 engines all part of the same family, sharing the same manufacturing equipment, rods, pistons, valves, and other parts. They feature coil-on-plug ignition systems, variable valve timing on the exhaust side, electronic throttle control, and a special oil pan with a pass-through for the half shafts in four-wheel drive vehicles. The inclusion of VVT on the exhaust camshaft side allows the Atlas series to meet emissions standards without the use of EGR, simplifying the engine design and increasing power for a broad power curve. The LL8 shares 75% of its components with the LK5 and L52; while the LK5 and L52 share 89% of their components.

The Atlas engines feature aluminum cylinder blocks and heads, with the cylinder bores featuring replaceable steel cylinder liners. The 4- and 5-cylinder versions feature dual balance shafts, which are unnecessary in the 6-cylinder.

The Atlas program began in 1995 along with the planning for GM's next-generation mid-size SUVs and pickup trucks. These vehicles were designed around the I6 engine. The I6 version was used in a Baja 1000 racing truck, winning its first race in a class that also included V8 engines. Another I6-powered truck won the truck class at the Pikes Peak International Hillclimb.

The Atlas engines were produced at the Flint Engine South plant in Flint, Michigan, while the I4 and I5 versions were produced at the Tonawanda Engine plant in Tonawanda, New York, near Buffalo.

== LL8 (Vortec 4200) ==
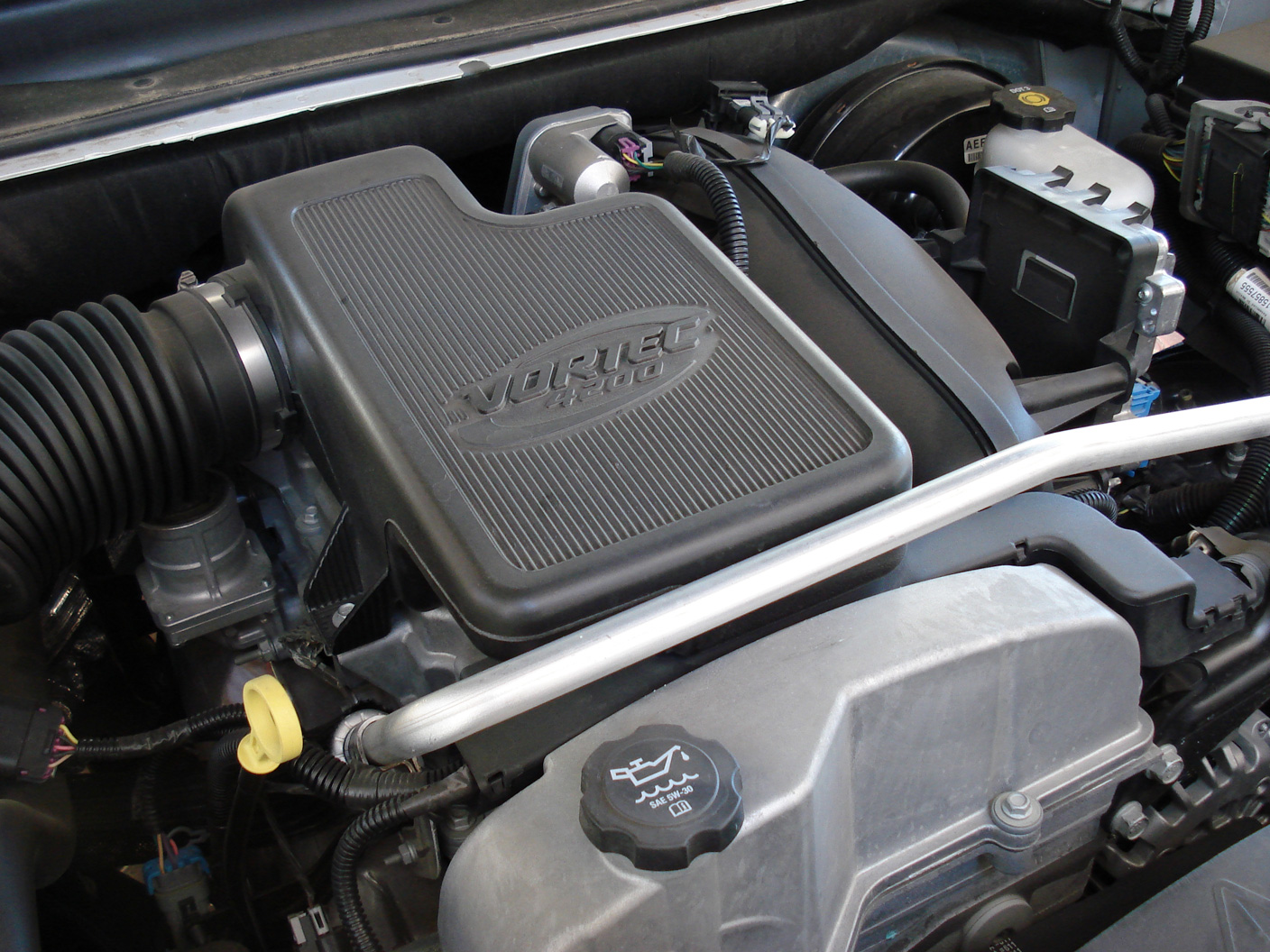
2006 LL8 (Vortec 4200) engine in 2006 Chevrolet TrailBlazer

The LL8 (or Vortec 4200), is a straight-6 gasoline engine produced from 2002 to 2009. It was the first Atlas engine, and was introduced in 2002 for the Chevrolet TrailBlazer, GMC Envoy, and Oldsmobile Bravada. The engine was also used in the Buick Rainier, Saab 9-7X, and Isuzu Ascender.

It displaces 4.2 L (4,160 cc; 253.9 cu in), with a 93 mm × 102 mm (3.66 in × 4.02 in) bore and stroke. It has four valves per cylinder, dual-overhead cams (DOHC), and variable valve timing on the exhaust cam, a first for GM inline engines. When introduced, this engine's power was 270 hp (201 kW) at 6,000 rpm and torque was 275 lb⋅ft (373 N⋅m) at 3,600 rpm. 2003 saw a slight bump in power to 275 hp (205 kW), while torque was unchanged. For 2006, power was increased to 291 hp (217 kW) at 6,000 rpm and torque to 277 lb⋅ft (376 N⋅m)) at 4800 rpm with the addition of a MAF and a complete internal redesign of the engine; however, due to the new SAE rating procedures, ratings can vary slightly between years. The engine redline is 6,300 rpm. The LL8 was on the Ward's 10 Best Engines list for 2002 through 2005 and was the basis for all the other Atlas engines. With the closure of the Moraine, Ohio, plant and the discontinuation of the GMT360 platform (Chevrolet TrailBlazer, GMC Envoy, etc.), production of the LL8 also ended.

Applications:

- 2002–2009 GMC Envoy, Envoy XL, and Envoy XUV
- 2002–2009 Chevrolet TrailBlazer and TrailBlazer EXT
- 2002–2004 Oldsmobile Bravada
- 2004–2007 Buick Rainier
- 2003–2008 Isuzu Ascender
- 2005–2009 Saab 9-7X 4.2i

== LLR (Vortec 3700) ==
The LLR (also called Vortec 3700), is a straight-5 DOHC engine produced from 2007 through 2012. It displaces 3.7 L (3,653 cc; 222.9 cu in), courtesy of a larger 95.5 mm (3.76 in) bore while keeping the 102 mm (4.02 in) stroke. The LLR also corrected the head issue found in the L52. It produces 242 hp (180 kW) at 5,600 rpm and 242 lb⋅ft (328 N⋅m) at 4,600 rpm. The engine redline is 6,300 rpm.

Applications:

- 2007–2012 Chevrolet Colorado and GMC Canyon
- 2007–2010 Hummer H3
- 2007–2008 Isuzu i-370

== L52 (Vortec 3500) ==
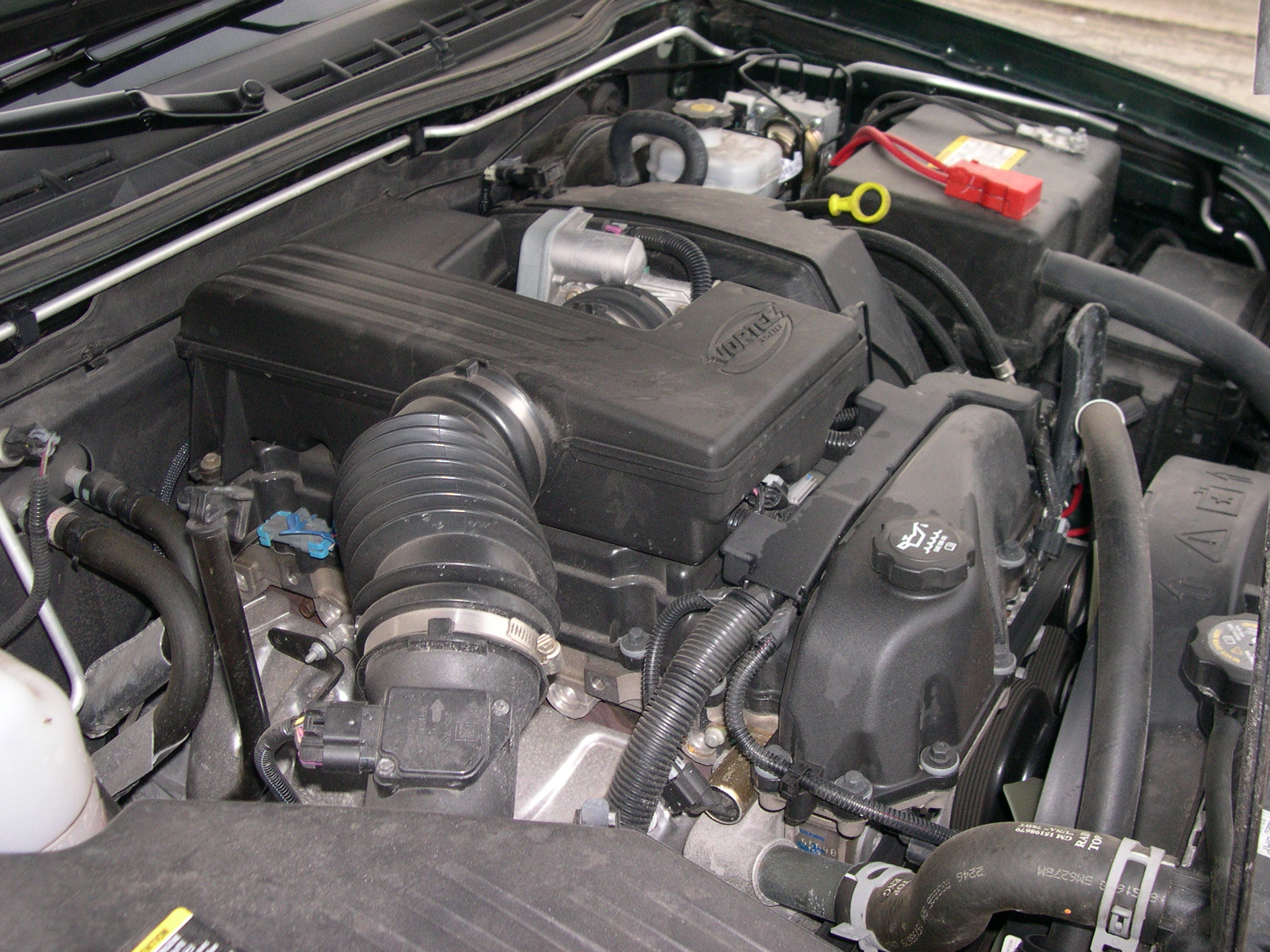
GMC Canyon Vortec 3500 engine

The L52 (also called Vortec 3500), is a straight-5 DOHC engine produced from 2004 through 2006. It displaces 3.5 L (3,460 cc; 211.1 cu in), with a 93 mm × 102 mm (3.66 in × 4.02 in) bore and stroke. Dynoed at the flywheel it produces 220 hp (164 kW) at 5,600 rpm and 225 lb⋅ft (305 N⋅m) at 2,800 rpm. The engine redline is 6,300 rpm.

Applications:

- 2002 Bel Air concept
- 2004–2006 Chevrolet Colorado and GMC Canyon
- 2006 Isuzu i-350
- 2006 Hummer H3

== LLV (Vortec 2900) ==
The LLV (also called Vortec 2900) is a 2.9 L; 178.3 cu in (2,921 cc) straight-4 DOHC engine produced between 2007 and 2012, with a 95.5 mm × 102 mm (3.76 in × 4.02 in) bore and a stroke. It replaced the LK5 and produced 185 hp (138 kW) at 5,600 rpm and 190 lb⋅ft (258 N⋅m) of torque at 2,800 rpm. The engine redline is 6,300 rpm.

Applications:

- 2007–2012 Chevrolet Colorado and GMC Canyon
- 2007–2008 Isuzu i-290

== LK5 (Vortec 2800) ==
The LK5 (also called the Vortec 2800) is a 2.8 L; 169.0 cu in (2,770 cc) straight-4 DOHC engine produced between 2004 and 2006, with a 93 mm × 102 mm (3.66 in × 4.02 in) bore and stroke. It produces 175 hp (130 kW) at 5,600 rpm and 185 lb⋅ft (251 N⋅m) of torque at 2,800 rpm. The engine redline is 6,300 rpm.

Applications:

- 2004–2006 Chevrolet Colorado and GMC Canyon
- 2006 Isuzu i-280
