= General Motors Vortec engine =

Line of gasoline truck engines

Vortec is a trademarked name for a line of gasoline engines for General Motors trucks. The name first appeared in an advertisement for the 1985 model year 4.3 L V6 that used "vortex technology" to create a vortex inside the combustion chamber, creating a better air / fuel atomization. It has since been used on a wide range of engines. Modern Vortec engines are named for their approximate displacement in cubic centimeters.

- I4
  - For the Vortec 2200, see General Motors 122 engine.
  - For the Vortec 2800, see General Motors Atlas engine.
  - For the Vortec 2900, see General Motors Atlas engine.
- I5
  - For the Vortec 3500, see General Motors Atlas engine.
  - For the Vortec 3700, see General Motors Atlas engine.
- I6
  - For the Vortec 4200, see General Motors Atlas engine.
- V6
  - For the Vortec 4300, see Chevrolet 90° V6 engine.
- V8
  - For the Vortec 4800, see General Motors small-block engine.
  - For the Vortec 5000, see Chevrolet small-block engine (first- and second-generation).
  - For the Vortec 5300, see General Motors small-block engine.
  - For the Vortec 5700, see Chevrolet small-block engine (first- and second-generation).
  - For the Vortec 6000, see General Motors small-block engine.
  - For the Vortec 6200, see General Motors small-block engine.
  - For the Vortec 7400, see Chevrolet big-block engine.
  - For the Vortec 8100, see Chevrolet big-block engine.
