= Car Allowance Rebate System =

US federal incentives program for consumer fuel efficiency boosts

Program logo

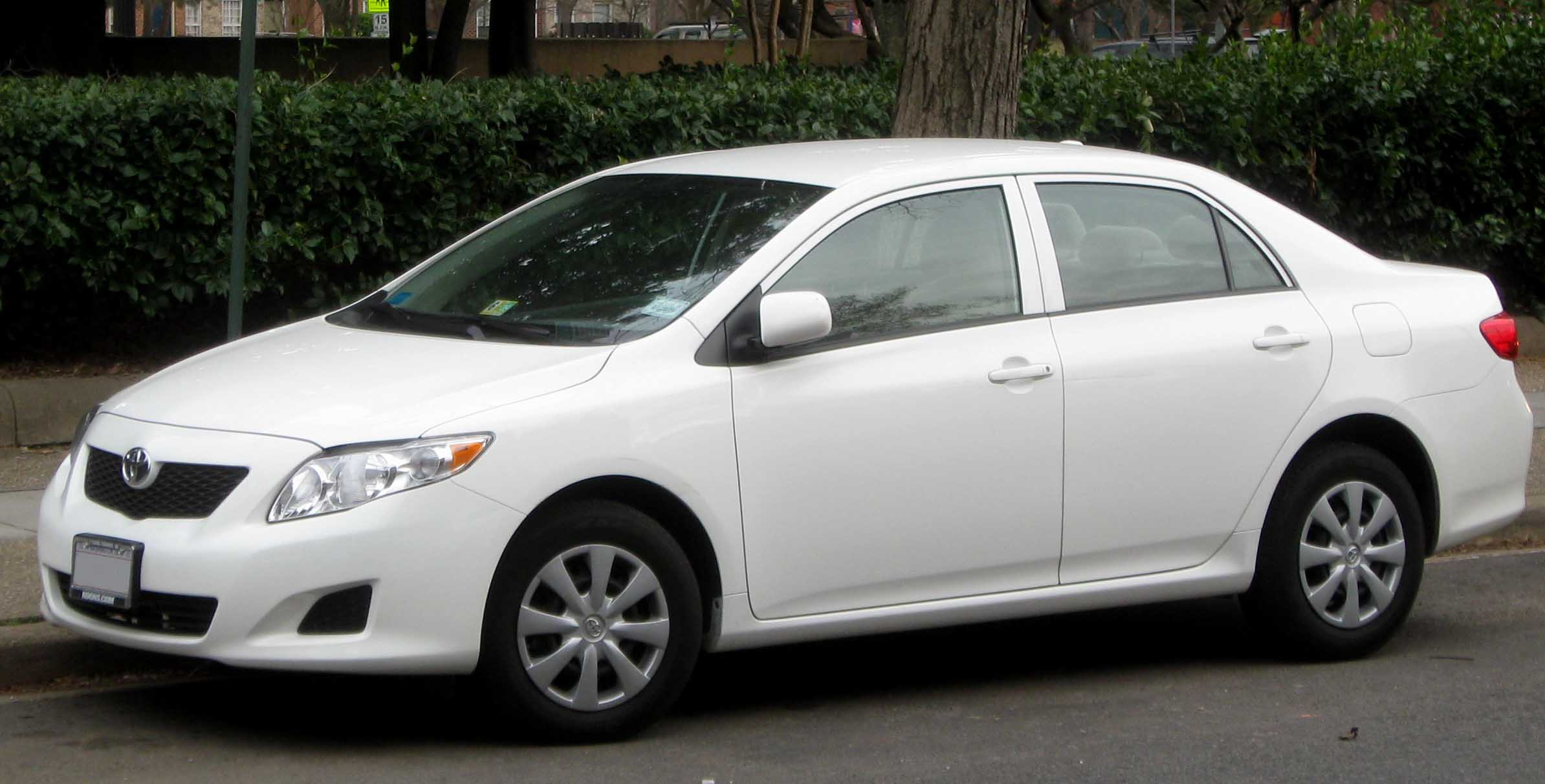
The Toyota Corolla was the program's top seller according to U.S. DoT

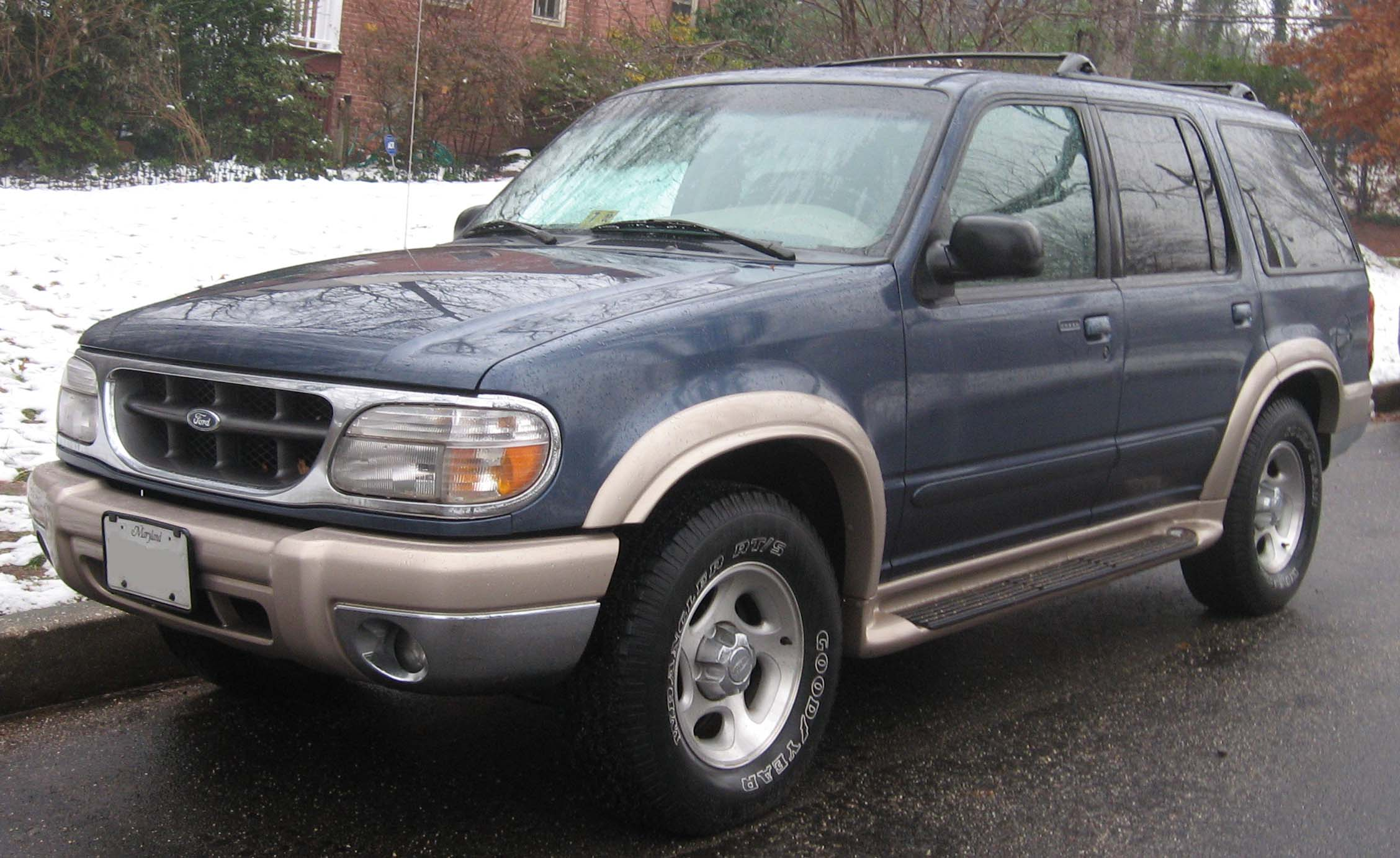
The Ford Explorer 4WD was the program's top trade-in according to the U.S. DoT

The Car Allowance Rebate System (CARS), colloquially known as "cash for clunkers", was a $3 billion U.S. federal scrappage program intended to provide economic incentives to U.S. residents to purchase a new, more fuel-efficient vehicle when trading in a less fuel-efficient vehicle. The program was promoted as a post-recession stimulus program to boost auto sales (which had declined due to the 2008 financial crisis, the Great Recession, and the 2008–2010 automotive industry crisis) while putting more fuel-efficient vehicles on the roadways.

The program officially started on July 1, 2009, the processing of claims began July 24, and the program ended on August 24, 2009, as the appropriated funds were exhausted, having scrapped 677,081 vehicles. The deadline for dealers to submit applications was August 25. According to estimates of the Department of Transportation, the initial $1 billion appropriated for the system was exhausted by July 30, 2009, well before the anticipated end date of November 1, 2009, due to very high demand. In response, Congress approved an additional $2 billion.

== Legislative history ==
Economist Alan Blinder helped popularize the idea of a scrappage program and the moniker "cash for clunkers" with his July 2008 op-ed piece in The New York Times. Blinder argued that a cash-for-clunkers program would have a three-pronged purpose of helping the environment, stimulating the economy, and reducing economic inequality.

Jack Hidary of Smart Transportation and Bracken Hendricks of the Center for American Progress co-wrote a paper that was distributed to congressional offices in November 2008 describing the multiple benefits of a cash-for-clunkers program.

The House approved creating a cash-for-clunkers program with the 298 to 119 passage of the CARS Act ("Consumer Assistance to Recycle and Save Act", H.R. 1550). The House bill, sponsored by Rep. Betty Sutton (D-Ohio), allowed consumers to trade-in vehicles with a combined fuel economy of 18 mpg_{‑US} (13 L/100 km; 22 mpg_{‑imp}) or less for new, more efficient vehicles. In the Senate, Debbie Stabenow (D-Michigan), and Sam Brownback (R-Kansas) sponsored a bill very similar to the House's.

An alternative bill proposed by Dianne Feinstein (D-California), Susan Collins (R-Maine), and Chuck Schumer (D-New York) would have had a greater focus on increasing fuel economy. Proponents argued that the alternative bill would lead to 32% more efficiency improvements than the House-Stabenow-Brownback version of the program. The alternative bill would have required that the trade-in vehicle have a fuel economy rating of 17 mpg_{‑US} (14 L/100 km; 20 mpg_{‑imp}) or less and offered a three-tiered voucher system ranging from $2,500 for a new car that is 7 mpg_{‑US} (8.4 mpg_{‑imp}) more efficient than a trade-in to $4,500 for one that is 13 mpg_{‑US} (16 mpg_{‑imp}) more efficient. Mileage improvement requirements would be less for light and heavy-duty trucks. Pre-1999 work trucks would be eligible for the $2,500 voucher regardless of mileage improvements. The alternative bill also gave a $1,000 voucher for the purchase of a more efficient used car; the House bill completely excluded used vehicles.

In the Senate, the cash-for-clunkers legislation was inserted into a larger war supplemental funding bill. Dissenting Senators raised a point of order under Rule 28, prohibiting inserting provisions not previously passed by either house into conference reports. The rule was overridden with 60 votes, despite some senators, including Sam Brownback, being uncomfortable with a last-minute change that called for the bill's funding to come from "deficit spending" rather than from the stimulus package that was initially agreed upon. The larger funding bill passed by a vote of 91–5 in the Senate.

The Supplemental Appropriations Act, 2009 was signed into law with the Consumer Assistance to Recycle and Save Program (C.A.R.S.) as Title XIII. The program received an initial allocation of $1 billion (out of the $4 billion estimated cost) funded by the U.S. government and the program's length was July 1 – November 1. It was implemented by the National Highway Traffic Safety Administration (NHTSA), which had 30 days from the approval of the bill to post all program details online.

In response to the U.S. Department of Transportation's estimate that the $1 billion appropriated for the system was almost exhausted by July 30, 2009, due to very high demand, Congress approved an additional $2 billion for the program with the explicit support of the Obama administration. On July 31, 2009, the House of Representatives approved the extra $2 billion for the program, and the Senate approved the extension on August 6, defeating all six amendments presented. President Barack Obama signed the bill into law on August 7, and the appropriation was exhausted by August 24, 2009.

== Eligibility criteria ==
- Vehicle must be less than 25 years old on the trade-in date.
- Only the purchase or 5-year minimum lease of new vehicles qualify.
- Generally, trade-in vehicles must get a weighted combined average rating of 18 or fewer miles per gallon (some very large pickup trucks and cargo vans have different requirements).
- Trade-in vehicles must be registered and insured continuously for the full year preceding the trade-in.
- Trade-in vehicles must be in driveable condition.
- The program requires the scrapping of the eligible trade-in vehicle and that the dealer discloses to the customer an estimate of the scrap value of the trade-in. The scrap value, however minimal, will be in addition to the rebate, and not in place of the rebate.
- The new car bought under the plan must have a suggested retail price of no more than $45,000, and for passenger automobiles, the new vehicle must have a combined fuel economy value of at least 22 mpg_{‑US} (11 L/100 km; 26 mpg_{‑imp}).

=== Last-minute car ineligibility ===
According to USA Today, the U.S. Environmental Protection Agency (EPA) revised its mileage estimate list just before the start of the Car Allowance Rebate System program.

For example, the 1991 Dodge Grand Caravan is listed below as ineligible because the 1991 Dodge Grand Caravan with a 4-cylinder engine has an EPA combined mileage of 19 and is not eligible; however, the V6 3.3 L and 3.8 L engines in these vehicles have EPA combined mileage of 18 and thus are eligible. The changes made some of the following cars with specific engine configurations ineligible:

Ineligible cars
1987 Alfa Romeo GTV	1987 Alfa Romeo Milano	1987 BMW 5 Series	1987 Chevrolet S10 Blazer 2WD
1987 Dodge Caravan/Grand Caravan/Ram Van 2WD	1987 Dodge Shadow	1987 Ford Aerostar Van	1987 Ford LTD Crown Victoria
1987 Ford LTD Crown Victoria Wagon	1987 GMC S15 Jimmy 2WD	1987 Lincoln Continental	1987 Lincoln Mark VII
1987 Lincoln Town Car	1987 Mercury Grand Marquis	1987 Mercury Grand Marquis Wagon	1987 Plymouth Sundance
1987 Plymouth Voyager/Grand Voyager 2WD	1987 Plymouth Voyager/Grand Voyager 2WD	1987 Porsche 944	1987 Toyota Truck 4WD
1988 Mazda 929	1988 Peugeot 505 Sedan	1988 Peugeot 505 Sedan	1988 Toyota 4Runner 4WD
1989 Mazda 929	1989 Peugeot 505 Sedan	1989 Porsche 911 Carrera	1990 Audi 80 Quattro
1990 Dodge Caravan/Grand Caravan/Ram Van 2WD	1990 Plymouth Voyager/Grand Voyager 2WD	1990 Saab 9000	1990 Toyota 1-Ton Truck 2WD
1990 Toyota Truck 2WD	1991 Audi 80 Quattro	1991 Dodge Caravan/Grand Caravan 2WD	1991 Dodge Ram 50 Pickup 2WD
1991 Lexus ES 250	1991 Mitsubishi Truck 2WD	1991 Plymouth Voyager/Grand Voyager 2WD	1991 Toyota Camry
1991 Toyota Camry Wagon	1992 Acura NSX	1992 Dodge Caravan/Grand Caravan 2WD	1992 Dodge Ram 50 Pickup 2WD
1992 Jeep Cherokee 4WD	1992 Jeep Comanche Pickup 4WD	1992 Mitsubishi Truck 2WD	1992 Plymouth Voyager/Grand Voyager 2WD
1992 Saab 900	1992 Saab 900	1993 Dodge Ram 50 Pickup 2WD	1993 Dodge Stealth
1993 Jeep Comanche Pickup 2WD	1993 Mitsubishi 3000 GT	1993 Mitsubishi Truck 2WD	1993 Toyota Camry
1993 Toyota Camry Wagon	1994 Mazda B2300/B3000/B4000 Pickup 2WD	1994 Mazda MPV	1994 Mitsubishi Diamante Wagon
1994 Volkswagen Corrado SLC	1995 Kia Sportage 2WD	1995 Mazda MPV	1995 Toyota Tacoma 2WD
1996 Jeep Cherokee 2WD	1996 Nissan Truck 2WD	1996 Toyota Supra	1996 Volkswagen Jetta GLX
1997 Chrysler Concorde	1997 Chrysler New Yorker/LHS	1997 Dodge Intrepid	1997 Eagle Vision
1997 Kia Sportage 4WD	1997 Mercedes-Benz C3 AMG	1997 Nissan Truck 2WD	1997 Toyota Supra
1997 Toyota T100 2WD	1997 Volkswagen Jetta GLX		

The EPA "gave no reason its ratings were inaccurate or why some went up", according to USA Today. Karl Brauer, editor-in-chief of Edmunds.com, said, "It's unfortunate that consumers who had been researching and planning to trade in their vehicle ... are now left in the dust". "Consumers acting in good faith should not be penalized for undisclosed and last-minute changes made by the government", Kevin Smith, Edmunds.com editorial director, said in a statement.

The U.S. Department of Transportation ruled that deals involving cash-for-clunkers trade-ins based on old EPA mileage numbers and consummated before July 24 would be honored, but that deals consummated after July 24 on vehicles that became ineligible as clunkers due to mileage rating changes would not be honored.

== Credit ==
Depending on the type of car purchased and "the difference in fuel economy between the purchased vehicle and the trade-in vehicle", the amount of the credit given in the form of vouchers to eligible customers was either $3,500 or $4,500. New car dealers were able to reduce the purchase price by the amount of the voucher for which the customer was eligible.

== Engine disablement and scrappage criteria ==
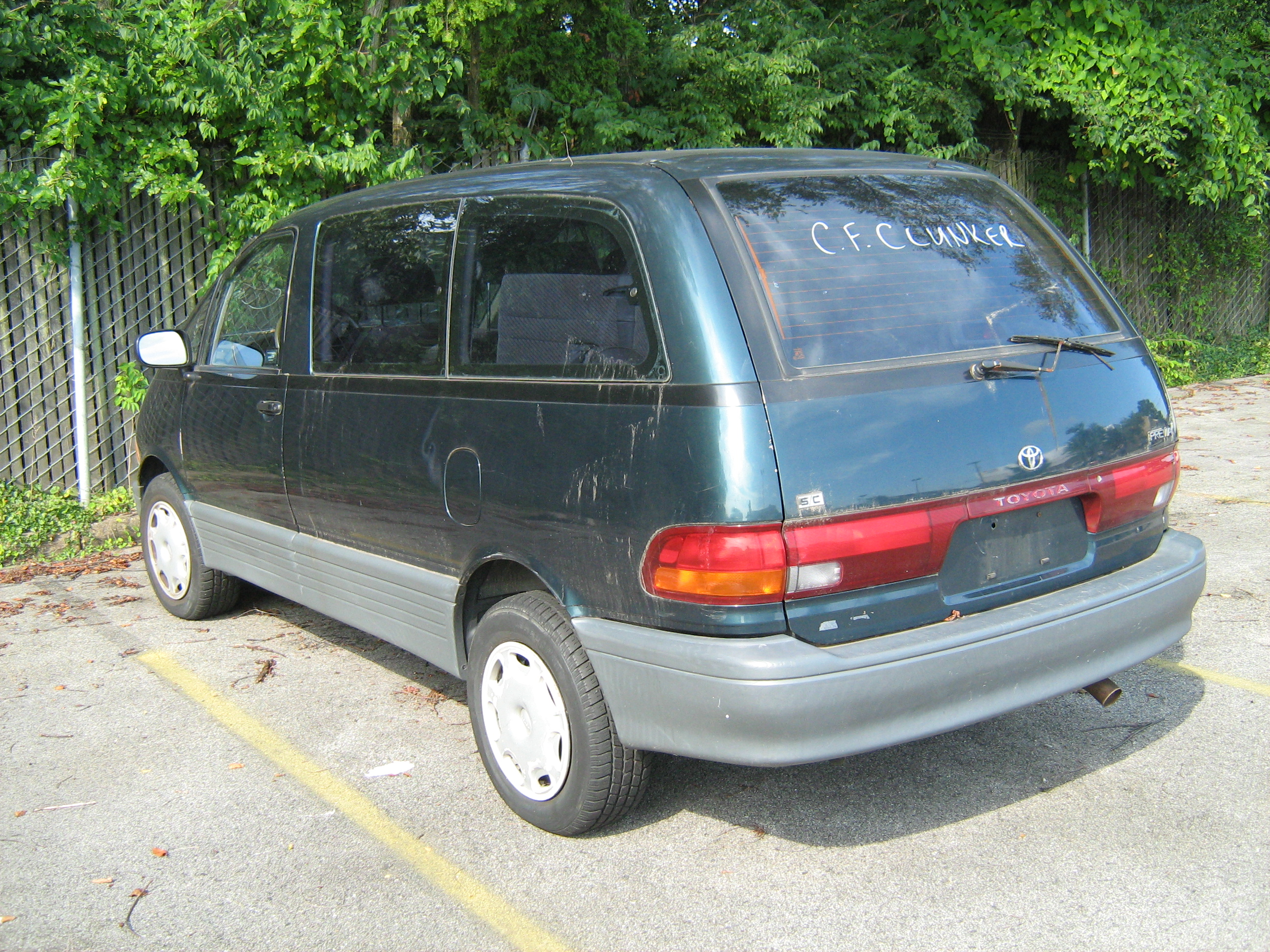
A disabled and marked "Cash for Clunker" Toyota Previa trade-in

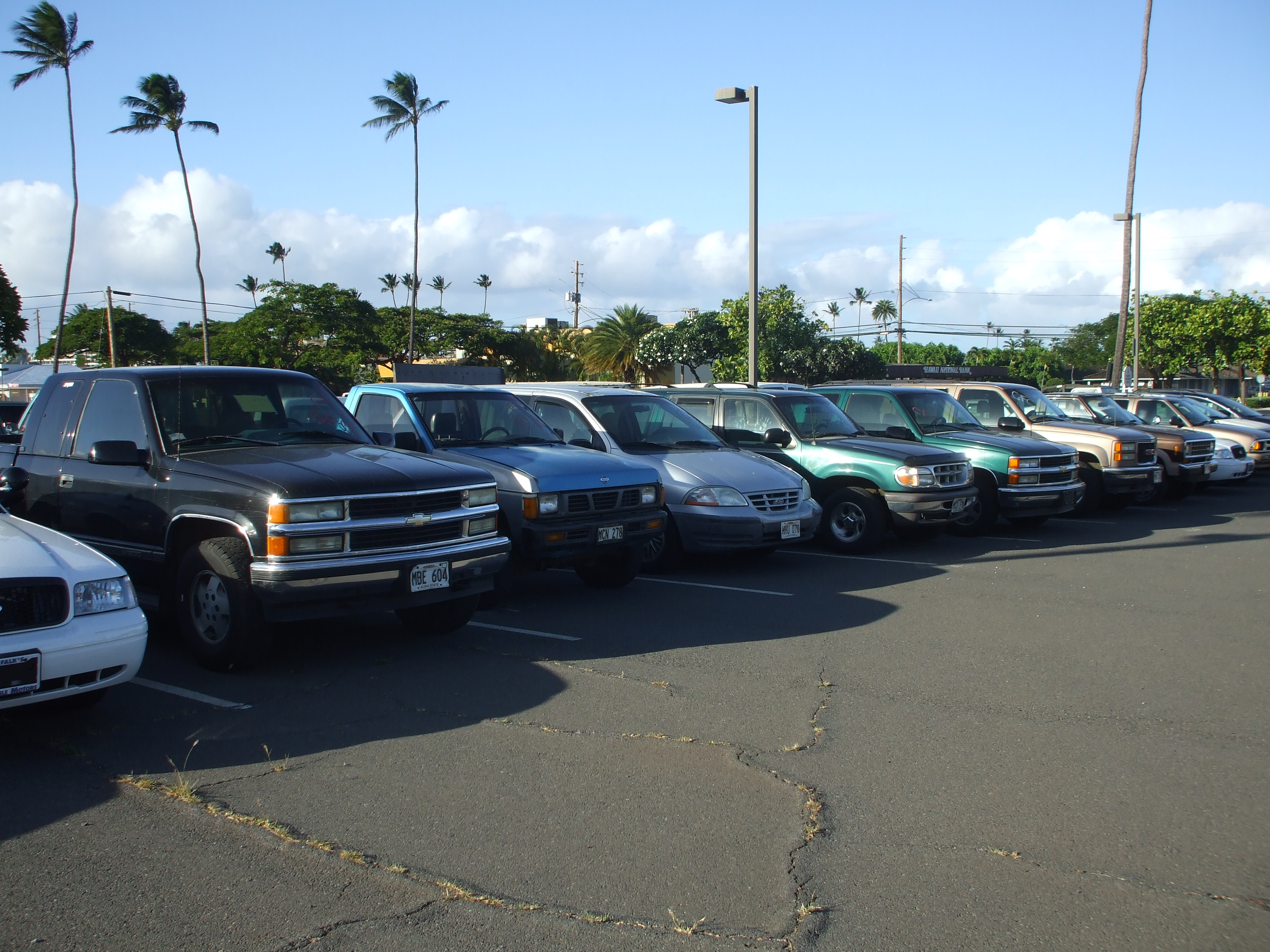
"Death Row" of traded in SUVS and trucks under Cash for Clunkers

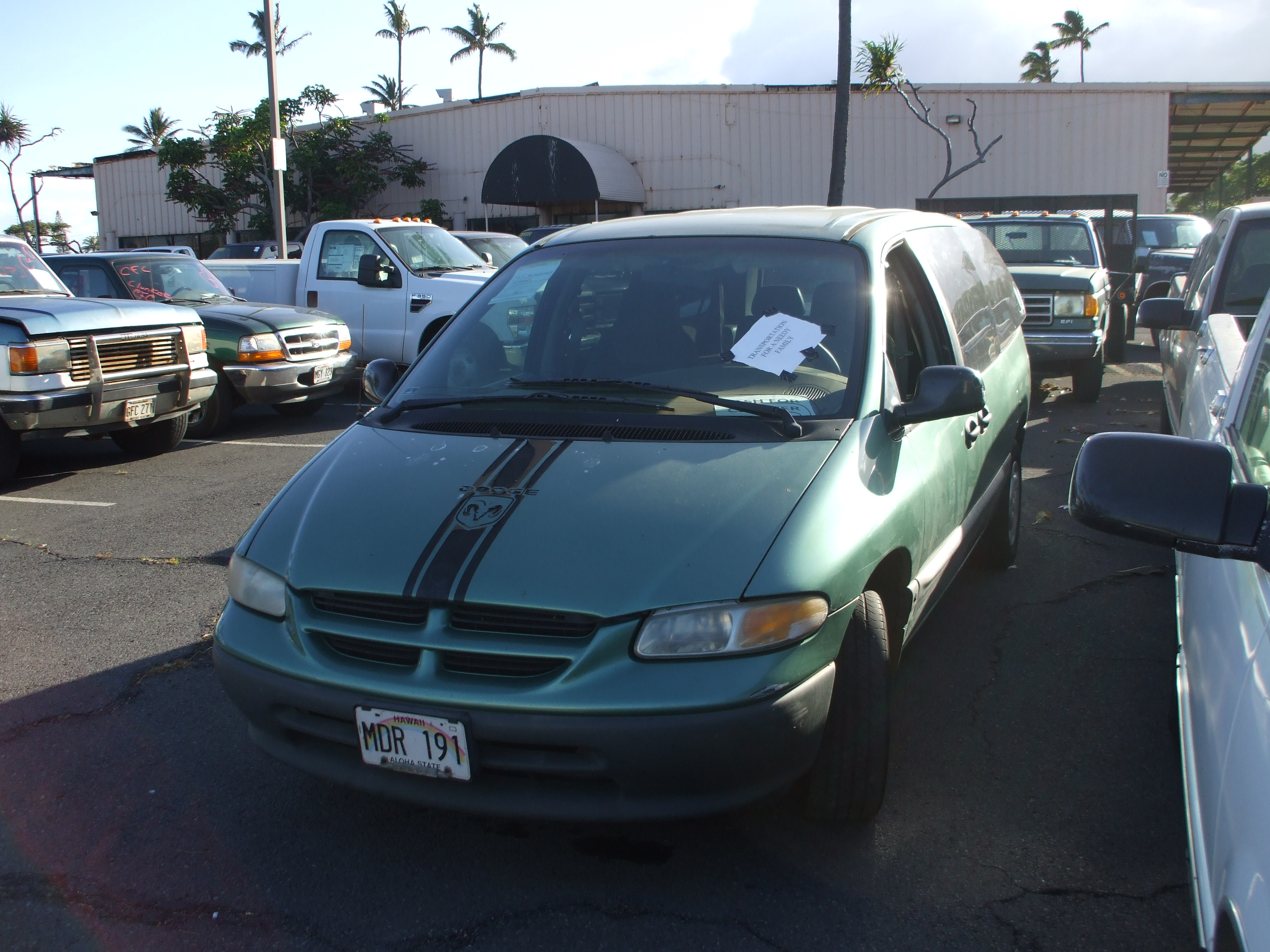
Dodge Caravan turned in for Cash for Clunkers (note paper placard on dash)

The program outlined a procedure to ensure that vehicles traded-in under "cash for clunkers" will not be resold by dealers by destructively disabling the engine (and thus also precluding the possibility that any mechanical engine components might be salvaged to be used in the repair of any other vehicles):

- The motor oil is drained and replaced with a sodium silicate solution.
- The engine is started and run until the solution becomes glass-like when heated, causing the engine's internal bearings, pistons and piston rings to abrade and ultimately seize.
- The salvage or scrap facility that acquires the vehicle cannot sell the engine, cylinder heads, or a "rolling chassis" from the scrap vehicle. The salvage or scrap facility can sell any other component (including the transmission and axles) from the scrap vehicle separately and may dismantle and warehouse the parts.
- The "hull" of the vehicle must be crushed within 180 days. Cut off or unbolted front-end assemblies may be saved and sold later, as well as the "top and back" of pickup cabs.

The outlined procedure described running the engine at 2,000 RPM "should disable the engine within a few minutes"; if not, then the engine should be allowed to cool off before repeating the procedure. Hazards associated with the intentional overheating and destruction of the engine include rupturing the radiator and hot water/steam, motor oil ejection, toxic fumes, and fire.

By completely disabling the engine, the CARS program avoided recycling schemes such as encountered in Germany, where authorities found that an estimated 50,000 scrapped vehicles were exported to Africa and Eastern Europe, where newer, safer cars of the type being destroyed in the West are prohibitively expensive. In contrast with the U.S. program, the German program only required dealers to drop off the scrapped vehicles at junkyards, thus allowing the illegal exports.

Auto recyclers and dismantlers criticized the U.S. program due to the requirement that the engine be disabled to prevent re-use of the car. To auto recyclers, a car's engine is considered the most valuable part of a junked car. Some recyclers refused to participate in the program, as well, due to the limited profit potential of junking a vehicle brought in under CARS.

== Tracking VINs to avoid fraud ==
After Hurricane Katrina, vehicles that were declared total losses in one state were transferred to other states and resold to unsuspecting consumers with clean titles, a process known as title washing. The federal government used a few strategies to avoid a similar situation occurring with vehicles from the CARS program, where "clunkers" would be illegally retitled and resold to consumers.

One involved the National Motor Vehicle Title Information System (NMVTIS), a federal program originally set up in 1992 to help deter vehicle theft. The CARS program required recyclers to report the Vehicle Identification Numbers (VINs) and the status of "clunker" to the NMVTIS. The searchable database would then provide that information to consumers, for a fee.

The federal government also partnered with providers of VIN-based vehicle history reports, such as CARFAX. The National Highway Traffic Safety Administration (NHTSA) submitted the VINs from the 700,000+ "clunkers" to CARFAX and other vehicle history providers. NHTSA and CARFAX also used the information to create a free "clunker check service," which allowed a user to submit a VIN and determine immediately if it had been reported as a salvage vehicle.

== Program participation and history ==
Auto Observer said there was one major technological glitch in the program. "Government officials said the public site for customers and the site for dealer sign-ups were on the same server, which became overloaded. The site was taken down on the night of July 24, 2009 while the two functions supposedly were separated and put on two different servers", Auto Observer reported. Dealers also had difficulty getting paperwork processed. Given the uncertainty of being paid, dealers decided to wait on destroying the old cars.

By July 29, $150 million of the $1 billion had already gone to new purchases. Dealers have had a higher volume of potential customers, partly because of other incentives offered by the manufacturers and the sellers. Some dealers believed the increase was only temporary. However, many people who visited car dealers found out their cars were not eligible and bought cars anyway. The majority of people who were able to participate were buying new vehicles anyway and their trade-in value rose significantly.

The National Highway Traffic Safety Administration reported 23,000 participating dealers. Stabenow said 40,000 cars had been sold and another 200,000 sales had yet to be completed. Sutton chief of staff Nichole Francis Reynolds said, "The program has spent $150 million and has another $800 million to $850 million in (pending) obligations. ... This is one of those programs you can really see working". Rep. Candice Miller (R-Mich.) said, "It has exceeded everyone's expectations". Miller and Sutton wanted to spend a total of $4 billion on the program. Bailey Wood, legislative director of the National Auto Dealers Association, said, "Obviously the program has been an immense success in stimulating automotive sales".

By July 30, 2009, due to very high demand, the $1 billion appropriated for the system was exhausted, well before the anticipated end date of November 1, 2009. The House of Representatives appropriated another $2 billion to the program on July 31, with the Senate adding its approval a week later. President Barack Obama signed the bill into law on August 7, and government officials expected that the additional funds will be exhausted by Labor Day.

On August 3, the DoT reported from a sample of 120,000 rebate applications already processed, that "the average gas mileage of cars being bought was 28.3 miles per gallon, for SUVs 21.9 miles per gallon, and for trucks, 16.3 miles per gallon, all significantly higher than required to get a rebate". Senator Susan M. Collins said that "vehicles being purchased under the program would go an average of 9.6 more miles per gallon than those being turned in, which she said was a 61 percent improvement".

The DOT also reported that "Ford, G.M. and Chrysler supplied 47 percent of the new vehicles, slightly more than their overall share of the market, which is 45 percent". Detroit's Big Three automakers said the demand peak that occurred in the final week of July left their inventories of unsold vehicles at the lowest levels in many years, but such windfall could hurt sales of some popular models in August. Ford sales went up in the United States for the first time since 2007, while GM and Chrysler at least improved by slowing their decline.

After the first week of the program, the Department of Transportation reported that the average fuel efficiency of trade-ins was 15.8 mpg_{‑US} (14.9 L/100 km; 19.0 mpg_{‑imp}), compared to 25.4 mpg_{‑US} (9.3 L/100 km; 30.5 mpg_{‑imp}) for the new cars purchased to replace them, translating to a 61% fuel efficiency improvement. The DoT also commented that the program participants were downsizing, rather than making one-for-one replacements, and turning in their old trucks and SUVs for new small sedans, as 83% of the trade-ins were trucks, and 60% of new purchases were cars. As of 3 August 2009, the top trade-in was the Ford Explorer 4WD and the top selling car was the Ford Focus. However, according to an analysis carried out by Edmunds based on a sample of transactions between July 24 to July 31 (the first week of the program), the Ford Escape crossover SUV was the actual best seller while the Ford Focus ranked in second place, when the tallying is done grouping different versions of the same vehicle together. As of August 21, the Department of Transportation reported that the downsizing trend continued, with the Toyota Corolla ranking as the top seller after four weeks of the program, followed by the Honda Civic, and the Ford Focus, and the Ford Explorer 4WD continued as the top trade-in.

According to USDoT, at the end of the program Toyota accounted for 19.4% of sales, followed by General Motors with 17.6%, Ford with 14.4%, Honda with 13.0%, and Nissan with 8.7%.

Top 10 trade-ins and replacements - Official U.S. DoT ranking at the end of the program
Top trade-ins				Top sellers
Ranking	Vehicle	Ranking	Vehicle	Ranking	Vehicle	Combined City/Hwy mileage (mpg)	Ranking	Vehicle	Combined City/Hwy mileage (mpg)
1	Ford Explorer 4WD	6	Jeep Cherokee 4WD	1	Toyota Corolla	25–30	6	Nissan Versa	N/A
2	Ford F-150 pickup 2WD	7	Chevrolet Blazer 4WD	2	Honda Civic	24–42	7	Toyota Prius	46
3	Jeep Grand Cherokee 4WD	8	Chevrolet C 1500 pickup 2WD	3	Toyota Camry	23–34	8	Honda Accord	N/A
4	Ford Explorer 2WD	9	Ford F-150 pickup 4WD	4	Ford Focus	27–28	9	Honda Fit	29–31
5	Dodge Caravan/Grand Caravan	10	Ford Windstar minivan	5	Hyundai Elantra	26–28	10	Ford Escape FWD	20–32
Sources: Final ranking by the U.S. Department of Transportation reported on August 26, 2009. Fuel economy by the National Highway Traffic Safety Administration.

The following table tabulates top replacements under the CARS program based on information submitted for rebates. Each vehicle model combines all drivetrains, hybrids and year models, which was tabulated separately in the U.S. Department of Transportation ranking.

Top 10 replacements ranking According to data submitted to CARS, as of September 9, 2009 (aggregating different versions and year models of the same vehicle together)
Ranking	Vehicle	Ranking	Vehicle
1	Toyota Corolla	6	Chevrolet Silverado pickup
2	Honda Civic	7	Nissan Versa
3	Toyota Camry	8	Ford F-150 pickup
4	Ford Focus	9	Honda Accord
5	Hyundai Elantra	10	Nissan Altima
Source: CARS New Model Vehicles, Sept. 9, 2009, As submitted, not necessarily reviewed or approved

== Impact ==
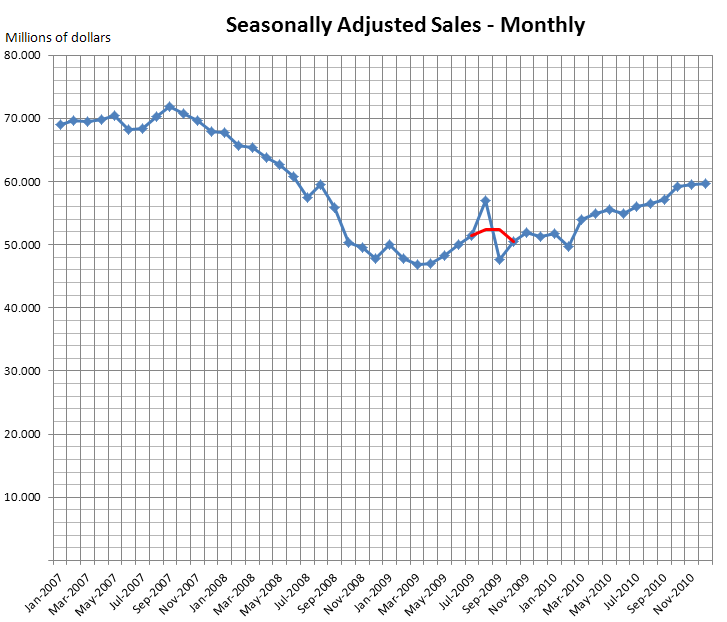
Millions of dollars on car sales per month. The red line averages the sales for the month of the clunkers program and the month after.

=== Economic effects ===
The Economists' Voice reported in 2009 that for each vehicle trade, the program had a net cost of approximately $2,000, with total costs outweighing all benefits by $1.4 billion. Edmunds reported that Cash for Clunkers cost US taxpayers $24,000 per vehicle sold, that nearly 690,000 vehicles were sold, and that only 125,000 of vehicle sales were incremental. Edmunds CEO concluded that without Cash for Clunkers, auto sales would have been even better.

A 2012 study published in the Quarterly Journal of Economics found that the Cash for Clunkers program "induced the purchase of an additional 370,000 cars in July and August 2009" but also found "strong evidence of reversal" (counties with higher participation in the program had fewer car sales in the ten months following the end of the program, offsetting most of the initial gains). The researchers found "no evidence of an effect on employment, house prices, or household default rates in cities with higher exposure to the program."

Conversely, a separate 2012 study published in Economics Bulletin had different findings. Using a reduced form demand model, the study authors concluded that the Cash for Clunkers program increased light vehicle sales in July and August 2009 by between 450,000 and 710,000 vehicles, and rejected "a 'Cash for Clunkers' associated decline in automobile sales in the months immediately following the termination of the program."

A 2013 study in the Journal of Environmental Economics and Management concluded that of the 680,000 transactions that took place under Cash for Clunkers, the program increased new vehicle sales by about 370,000 in July and August 2008, "implying that approximately 45 percent of the spending went to consumers who would have purchased a new vehicle anyway," and that "Our results cannot reject the hypothesis that there is little or no gain in sales beyond 2009." A 2020 study found that the program "caused roughly 500,000 purchases during the program period."

A 2013 Brookings Institution study found that the Cash for Clunkers program resulted in a modest short-run stimulus effect (specifically, an increase in vehicle production, GDP, and job creation), but that "the implied cost per job created was much higher than alternative fiscal stimulus policies" and "these small stimulus effects do not account for the depletion of the capital stock that resulted from the destruction of used vehicles." The study authors said "consumers who participated in the CARS program did not decrease other measures of consumption to do so."

A 2017 study in the American Economic Journal found that the program, intended to increase consumer spending, reduced total new vehicle spending by $5 billion. The researchers found that because tax incentives could only be used on fuel-efficient vehicles, and because fuel-efficient vehicles tended to be less expensive than other vehicles, the program shifted purchases to less expensive cars and reduced overall consumer spending.

=== Environmental effects ===
A 2009 study by researchers at the University of Michigan Transportation Research Institute evaluated the effects of the program on the average fuel economy considering a baseline without the existence of the program, since there was already a trend for buying vehicles with higher fuel economy due to the high gasoline prices of 2007 and 2008, and the 2008 financial crisis. The study found that the program improved the average fuel economy of all vehicles purchased by 0.6 mpg in July 2009 and by 0.7 mpg in August 2009.

A 2010 study published in the journal Environmental Research Letters reported on the findings of a life-cycle assessment study of the CARS program. The researchers found that CARS prevented 4.4 million metric tons of carbon dioxide equivalent emissions, representing an estimated 0.4% of the annual U.S. emissions from light-duty vehicles.

A 2013 study published in the Journal of Environmental Economics and Management concluded that the program reduced carbon emissions by between 9 million tons and 28.2 million tons, "implying a cost per ton ranging from $92 to $288 even after accounting for reduced criteria pollutants."

A 2013 Brookings Institution study found that "the CARS program led to a slight improvement in fuel economy and some reduction in carbon emissions. The cost per ton of carbon dioxide reduced from the program suggests that the program was not a cost-effective way to reduce emissions, although was more cost-effective than some other environmental policies, such as the tax subsidy for electric vehicles or the tax credit for ethanol."

A 2011 report by the American Council for an Energy-Efficient Economy said while vehicles purchased under the CARS program led to modest fuel economy gains—the average participant in the program purchased a vehicle with a fuel economy "2.4 miles per gallon (mpg) higher than the market as a whole and 2.9 mpg higher than they would have otherwise purchased"—Congress has missed an opportunity to push for further fuel-economy gains. ACEEE wrote that "by setting more demanding eligibility requirements for the vehicles purchased, lawmakers could have increased the fuel economy benefits of the program while preserving its stimulative effect on the economy."

=== Vehicle safety effects ===
A spokesman for the National Highway Traffic Safety Administration pointed out the newer cars purchased under the program were "considerably safer" than the older cars they replaced. Consumer Reports said the program prompted consumers to replace older cars without electronic stability control, side curtain airbags, and tire pressure monitoring systems with more modern cars that included these safety features.

=== Charities and scrap value ===
Charitable organizations bemoaned the program, noting the lack of repairable cars for charity purposes, and a source of revenue to fund programs. A collection of charities, under the umbrella of Pete Palmer's Vehicle Donation Processing Center, reported a 7.5% decline in car donations in the month the Car Allowance Rebate System debuted.

Part of the Car Allowance Rebate System bill made buyers eligible for the scrap value of the car along with the rebate, with the dealers taking in $50 of the value and to share the rest of the value to the buyer. While some dealers and Car Dealer Associations have argued that buyers were not entitled to the scrap value of the car, advocacy groups and states' Attorneys General argued that the law made it clear that buyers were entitled to the scrap value of the car. Some dealers have claimed that they did pass on the scrap value of the car to buyers.

=== Exotic cars under the program ===
Jalopnik reviewed the lists published by the NHTSA and found numerous cars crushed under the program that had book values far exceeding the rebates offered by the government. Among some of the cars whose book value was worth more than government rebates included models ranging from the GMC Typhoon to the Bentley Continental R. However, a further review said many cars that were thought of as being crushed under the program were improperly recorded and/or swapped for other car models or trims. Some exotic/collectible vehicles that were scrapped under the program included a Maserati Biturbo with 18,140 miles, a GMC Syclone, which was removed from scrappage in the program by a group of car enthusiasts a GMC Typhoon, an Isuzu Vehicross, a La Forza SUV, a TVR 280i,a Buick GNX and various Ford Mustang, Ford Taurus SHO, Chevrolet Camaro, and Chevrolet Corvette models, among other cars.

== Ending the program ==
On August 20, 2009, Transportation Secretary Ray LaHood announced that the program would end at 8:00 p.m. Eastern Time on Monday, August 24. After the announcement, several dealers decided to stop participating in the program after Saturday, August 22, due to the difficulties in processing their reimbursements through the government web site where the paperwork must be filed.

Secretary Ray LaHood also commented that "it [had] been a thrill to be part of the best economic news story in America", in a news conference regarding the announcement on August 20. As of early August 25, the DoT reported 665,000 dealer transactions corresponding to $2.77 billion in rebates.

In October 2011, former Obama administration economic advisor Austan Goolsbee stated that "the administration misjudged how quickly the country could recover from the economic damage of the 2008 economic collapse" and now knowing that it has "proved a longer, tougher ride than we thought at the time", he would not have created this short-run program to stimulate the economy, but "he supports the overall stimulus program, which he claims warded off a depression."

At the end of the program, decade old data was retrieved from the cars.gov website with which vehicles were destroyed. The data had vehicle year, make with model, and car frequency counts showing the various vehicles scrapped as cars and trucks meeting the guidelines. Out of the 677,081 vehicles that were destroyed, there were several domestic models that ranked in the top 10. The following table provides the actual rankings of vehicles that were claimed for destruction in the program:

Top 10 Car Allowance Rebate System (Cash For Clunkers)
Rank	Year Range	Vehicles	Number
1	1995–2003	Ford Explorer/Mercury Mountaineer	46,676
2	1996–2000	Chrysler/Dodge/Plymouth minivans	23,998
3	1993–1998	Jeep Grand Cherokee	20,844
4	1992–1997	Ford F-150	20,222
5	1984–2001	Jeep Cherokee	18,329
6	1988–2002	GM C/K pickup	17,202
7	1995–2005	Chevrolet Blazer	15,668
8	1999–2003	Ford Windstar	12,157
9	1991–1994	Ford Explorer	11,612
10	1994–2001	Dodge Ram 1500	8,103

== See also ==
- Parable of the broken window
- Scrappage program
- Transport and the environment
