= Production Automotive Services =

Defunct American motor vehicle manufacturer

PAS Inc.
- Industry: Automotive
- Founded: 1989
- Defunct: 1994
- Headquarters: Troy, Michigan; Van Nuys, California, United States
- Area served: North America; Middle East
- Key people: Jeff Beitzel; Scott Kelly; Mack King; John Koss; Jim Stokes
- Products: Automobiles

Production Automotive Services, Inc. (commonly referred to as PAS) and formally known as Prototype Automotive Services, was a specialty vehicle manufacturer which produced the 1989 Pontiac Turbo Trans Am, the 1991 GMC Syclone, the 1992 GMC Sonoma GT and the 1992 - 1993 GMC Typhoon. These were the only projects PAS created with General Motors before merging and becoming TDM Technologies in Livonia, MI and Wheel to Wheel in Troy, MI.

== History ==
1989 marked the 20th anniversary for Pontiac's flagship ponycar, the Trans Am, and Bill Owen at Pontiac Motor Division saw to it that it was a special one. Pontiac engineers originally wanted to use an all-aluminum V-8 engine in the TTA. That plan never materialized, so the 3.8L Intercooled Buick Turbo V-6 engine from the Buick Grand National was chosen and equipped with cylinder heads from the existing 3800 Series I V-6, because of their increased clearance at the strut towers and superior flow.

The contract to outfit the TTA engine was given to PAS Engineering in Van Nuys, CA and the work took place in its 40,000-square-foot City of Industry facility. After the engines were completed, they were shipped back to GM, installed in the cars and then returned to PAS for testing and quality-control checks, before being offered to the public for sale. Jeff Beitzel, who was the president of PAS, had his personal 20th Anniversary TTA (one of the 5 pilots cars) sent to American Specialty Cars (ASC) and made into a convertible.

PAS also made other performance changes, which included the 1LE brake package originally engineered for Trans Am racecars. The setup featured vented 12-inch front and 11.7-inch rear rotors to ensure fade-free performance. The aluminum dual-piston front and single-piston rear calipers were borrowed from the Chevrolet Corvette.

Throughout the project, Scott Kelly, who was the Engineering Liaison of PAS, was instrumental in the development and production of the TTA. Scott served as the go-between for PAS and General Motors throughout the program and was responsible for all of the Trans Ams used during the month of May 1989, including the three actual pace cars. After the TTA program, Scott worked as the Service and Warranty Administrator for the TTA, GMC Syclone, Typhoon, Sonoma GT, and natural-gas-powered trucks, that PAS produced until 1994.

== Products ==
- Pontiac Turbo Trans Am (1989): 1,555 units
- GMC Syclone (1991): 2,998 units
- GMC Sonoma GT (1992): 806 units
- GMC Typhoon (1992): 2,497 units
- GMC Typhoon (1993): 2,200 units
