= Chevrolet 90° V6 engine =

Former American engine

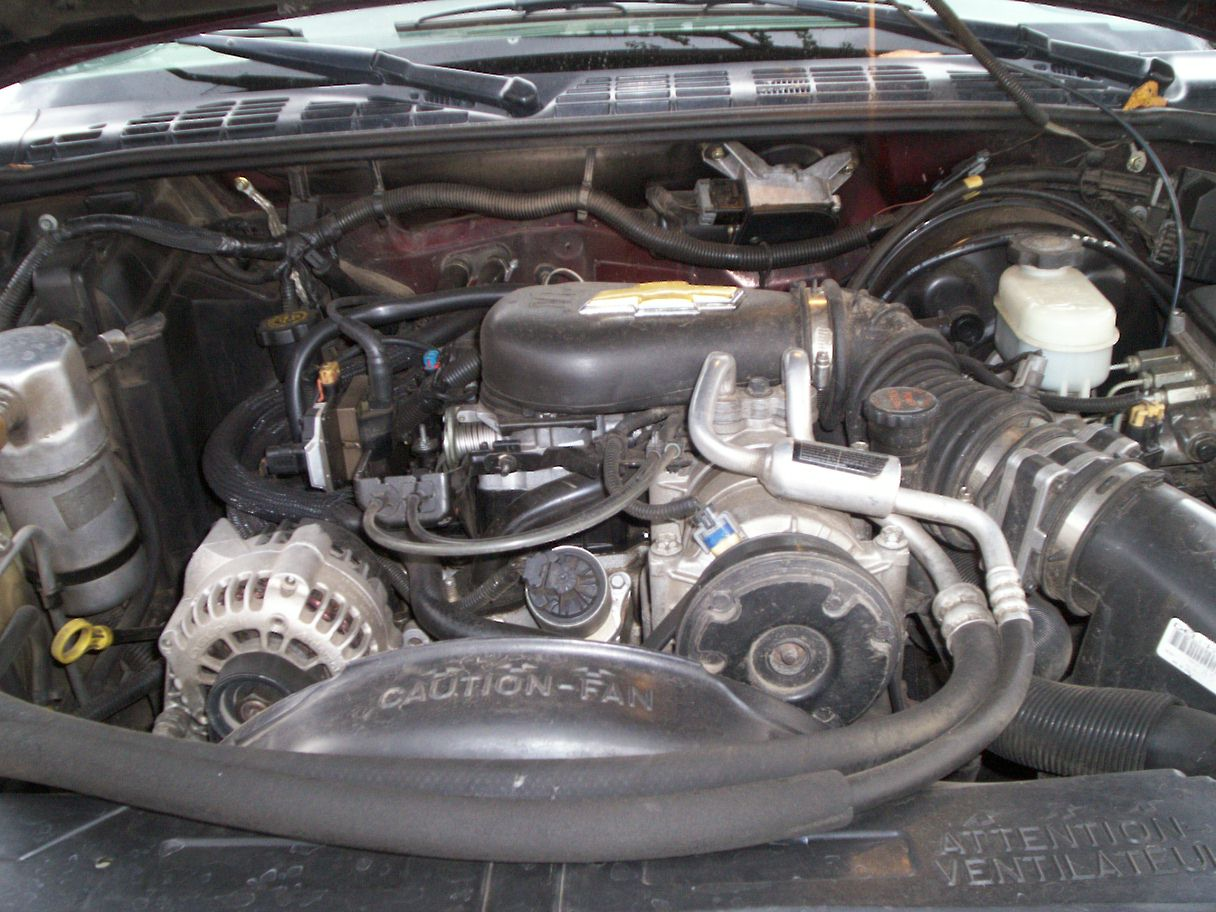

Overview
- Manufacturer: General Motors
- Production: 1978–present

Layout
- Configuration: 90° V6
- Displacement: 200 cu in (3.3 L); 229 cu in (3.8 L); 262 cu in (4.3 L)
- Cylinder bore: 3 1/2 in (88.9 mm); 3.736 in (94.9 mm); 4 in (101.6 mm)
- Piston stroke: 3.48 in (88.4 mm)
- Cylinder block material: Cast iron
- Cylinder head material: Cast iron
- Valvetrain: OHV 2 valves × cyl.
- Compression ratio: 8.2:1, 8.35:1, 8.6:1, 9.1:1, 9.2:1, 9.3:1

Combustion
- Turbocharger: Mitsubishi TD06-17C with Garrett Water/Air intercooler (on GMC Syclone and Typhoon only)
- Fuel system: Rochester 2- Dualjet or 4-bbl. Quadrajet carburetors Throttle-body fuel injection Multi-point fuel injection
- Fuel type: Gasoline
- Cooling system: Water-cooled

Output
- Power output: 94–280 hp (70–209 kW)
- Torque output: 154–360 lb⋅ft (209–488 N⋅m)

Dimensions
- Dry weight: 450 lbs

Chronology
- Predecessor: Chevrolet Turbo-Thrift engine

The Chevrolet 90° V6 family of V6 engines began in 1978 with the Chevrolet 200 cu in (3.3 L) as the base engine for the all new 1978 Chevrolet Malibu. The original engine family was phased out in early 2014, with its final use as the 4.3 L (262 cu in) V6 engine used in Chevrolet and GMC trucks and vans. Its phaseout marks the end of an era of Chevrolet small-block engine designs dating back to the 1955 model year. A new Generation V 4.3 L (262 cu in) V6 variant entered production in late 2013, based on the LT1 small block V8 and first used in the 2014 Silverado/Sierra 1500 trucks.

== Generation I ==
These engines have a 90° V-block with twelve valves activated by a pushrod valvetrain. All engines have cast iron blocks and cylinder heads. The engines are based on the Chevrolet Small-Block engine, and the V6 is formed by the removal of the #3 and #6 cylinders. The V6s share the same 4.4-inch (110 mm) bore spacing and 9.025-inch (229.2 mm) deck height as the V8 engines. Many parts are interchangeable between the 90° V6 and the small block V8 including valvetrain components, some bearings, piston assemblies, lubrication and cooling system components, and external accessories. The 90° V6 engine uses the same transmission bellhousing pattern as the Chevrolet small-block V8 engine. The oil pan dipstick is located on the passenger side above the oil pan rail; this design was phased in on both the 90° V6 and Small Block Chevrolet assembly lines (for engines manufactured after 1979) sharing the same casting dies. All the engines use a 1-6-5-4-3-2 firing order. The engines in this family are longitudinal engines, and have been used in rear-wheel drive cars and trucks, industrial, and marine applications. Until 2014, the Chevrolet 90° V6 was produced at the GM Powertrain Division plant in Romulus, Michigan.

=== 3.3L (200 CID) ===
Introduced in 1978, the 200 cu in (3.3 L) replaced the larger 250 cu in (4.1 L) as the base engine for Chevrolet's new downsized intermediate line. The 200 cu in (3.3 L) used a unique 3.5-by-3.48-inch (88.9 mm × 88.4 mm) bore and stroke (the Chevrolet 305 and 350 cu in (5.0 and 5.7 L) V8 engines shared the same stroke dimension). These bore and stroke dimensions were later used by the 267 cu in (4.4 L) V8 Chevrolet engine. Also like the small block V8 engines, the 200 cu in (3.3 L) V6 used 2.45-inch (62.2 mm) main bearings and 2.1-inch (53.3 mm) rod bearing diameters.

Being a 90° V6, Chevrolet took steps to eliminate the rough running tendencies of the 200. The crankshaft has each of its connecting rod throws offset by 18 degrees for each pair of rods. This required the connecting rods to have 0.05-inch (1.3 mm) narrower ends as well as a thrust bearing to be installed between each pair of rods. However, the connecting rods were still the same 5.7-inch (140 mm) length as most other small-block Chevrolet V8 engines. This produced an engine with a semi-even fire sequence of 132 degrees/108 degrees.

The 200 cu in (3.3 L) V6 was only produced for 1978 and 1979. It was available only with a 2-barrel carburetor. In 1978, the 200 cu in (3.3 L) used the Rochester 2GC carburetor and in 1979 it used a Rochester Dualjet carburetor. The smaller Dualjet carburetor caused a slight decrease in power.

Year	Horsepower	Torque	Bore and Stroke	Carburetor	Compression Ratio
1978	95 hp (71 kW) @ 3800 rpm	160 lb⋅ft (217 N⋅m) @ 2000 rpm	3 1/2 in × 3.48 in (88.9 mm × 88.4 mm)	2-BBL 2GC	8.2:1
1979	94 hp (70 kW) @ 4000 rpm	154 lb⋅ft (209 N⋅m) @ 2000 rpm	3 1/2 in × 3.48 in (88.9 mm × 88.4 mm)	2-BBL M2ME	8.2:1

=== 3.8L (229 CID) ===
The 229 cu in (3.8 L) engine was first introduced for the 1980 model year. This engine replaced the 250 cu in (4.1 L) straight-six in full-size Chevrolets and Camaros as the base six-cylinder engine. Additionally, the intermediate Chevrolet Malibu and Monte Carlo also used the 229 cu in (3.8 L) as a replacement for both the 200 cu in (3.3 L) V6 and the 231 cu in (3.8 L) Buick V6. Checker Motors Corporation also used this engine starting with its 1980 A11 Taxi and A12 Marathon sedans. Both the Buick V6 and the 229 cu in (3.8 L) Chevrolet V6 are 90° V6 engines, and are often referred to as the 3.8L V6. These engines should not be confused as being the same, and are unique engine designs.

The 229 cu in (3.8 L) has a 3.736-by-3.48-inch (94.9 mm × 88.4 mm) bore and stroke, identical to the Chevrolet 305 cu in (5.0 L) V8 engine. The 229 cu in (3.8 L) used the same 2.45-inch (62.2 mm) main bearing and 2.1-inch (53.3 mm) rod bearing diameters as the 200 cu in (3.3 L) V6 engine. Also like the 200 cu in (3.3 L) V6, the 229 cu in (3.8 L) used the same crankshaft with the 18-degree offset throws and the same 5.7-inch (140 mm) connecting rods with 0.05-inch (1.3 mm) narrowed ends. It came equipped with 1.84-inch (46.7 mm) intake valves and 1 1/2-inch (38.1 mm) exhaust valves. The 229 cu in (3.8 L) V6 was only equipped with a 2-barrel carburetor. For 1980, the 229 cu in (3.8 L) used a mechanical Dualjet. From 1981 to 1984, the electronic Dualjet was used along with the GM's CCC (Computer Command Control) system. The 229 cu in (3.8 L) was rated between 110 and 115 hp (86 kW).

Year	Horsepower	Torque	Bore and Stroke	Carburetor	Compression Ratio
1980	115 hp (86 kW) at 4,000 rpm	175 lb⋅ft (237 N⋅m) at 2,000 rpm	3.736 in × 3.48 in (94.9 mm × 88.4 mm)	2-BBL M2ME	8.6:1
1981–1982	110 hp (82 kW) at 4,200 rpm	170 lb⋅ft (230 N⋅m) at 2,000 rpm	3.736 in × 3.48 in (94.9 mm × 88.4 mm)	2-BBL E2ME	8.6:1
1983–1984	110 hp (82 kW) at 4,000 rpm	190 lb⋅ft (258 N⋅m) at 1,600 rpm	3.736 in × 3.48 in (94.9 mm × 88.4 mm)	2-BBL E2ME	8.6:1

=== 4.3L (262 CID) ===
The 4.3 L (4,300 cc; 262.4 cu in) V6 is the last and most successful engine in the Chevrolet 90° V6 engine family. This engine was introduced in 1985 as a replacement for the 229 cu in (3.8 L) V6 in the full-size Chevrolet, the Chevrolet El Camino, and Chevrolet Monte Carlo. It also replaced the 250 cu in (4.1 L) in the Chevrolet and GMC full-size trucks and full-size vans, and in 1990, it replaced the 292 cu in (4.8 L) in the Step-Vans as the new base six-cylinder engine.

The 4.3 L (262 cu in) V6 has a 4 in × 3.48 in (101.6 mm × 88.4 mm) bore and stroke, identical to the 350 cu in (5.7 L) Chevrolet V8 engine. To create a true even-fire engine, Chevrolet produced a crankshaft with 30-degree offsets between each rod pin. Consequently, rod journals were increased to a larger 2 1/4 inches (57.2 mm). The connecting rods used on the 4.3 L (262 cu in) are therefore unique to this engine, being 5.7 inches (140 mm) in length, but having the larger 2 1/4 inches (57.2 mm) journals. The 4.3 L (262 cu in) also used larger valves than the 229 cu in (3.8 L) V6, with a 1.94-inch (49.3 mm) intake valve and a 1 1/2-inch (38.1 mm) exhaust valve (also shared with the 350).

In 1986 and 1987, the 4.3 L (262 cu in) engine saw engine design upgrades similar to the Chevrolet small block V8. In 1986, the rear main crankshaft oil seal was changed from a two-piece to a one-piece seal. Some 1985 model year vehicles would have a 1986 engine due to service replacement – cylinder blocks were shipped with oil pans. 1987 saw new center bolt valve covers and hydraulic roller lifters.

For the 1992 model year, the 4.3 L (262 cu in) had its block design modified to allow a balance shaft to be installed. Even though the 4.3 L (262 cu in) is an even-fire V6, the 90° block layout is not ideal for smoothness. The balance shaft on the 4.3 L (262 cu in) is installed above the camshaft and runs through the middle of the lifter valley. It is gear-driven off the camshaft timing sprocket, and therefore, a new timing chain cover was required for these balanced 4.3L V6s. Balance shaft engines do not have provisions for a mechanical fuel pump, unlike the non-balance shaft engines which retained the cast-in boss.

For the 2007 model year, the distributor was eliminated in place of a coil-on-plug ignition system (using a 58x crankshaft position sensor based on the GEN IV LSx). This resulted in a redesigned timing cover with a wider bottom flange, making it incompatible with the 1996–06 LU3/L35. The only vehicles using the new revision of the 4.3 L (262 cu in) were the half-ton versions of the Chevrolet Silverado/GMC Sierra (2007–2013) and Chevrolet Express/GMC Savana (2008–2014).

==== LB1 and LB4 ====
In 1985, the 4.3 L (262 cu in) was either equipped with throttle-body fuel injection (RPO LB4) or a Rochester Quadrajet four-barrel carburetor (RPO LB1). The Chevrolet Caprice, Chevrolet Monte Carlo, Chevrolet El Camino, Pontiac Parisienne, and Pontiac Grand Prix used the LB4 rated at 130 hp (97 kW). Pickups and vans used the LB1 version rated at 155 hp (116 kW). The LB1 used in trucks and vans was referred to as Vortec in Chevrolet literature (named after a combustion chamber design known as a swirl port which twists the fuel mix from the intake ports as introduced with the Cavalier's 2.0L engine), and this name continued to be used with all truck and van 4.3 L (262 cu in) V6s until 2014.

In 1986, the 4.3 L (262 cu in) engine used in passenger cars saw an increase in power to 140 hp (104 kW). This engine remained unchanged until 1990 when it was last used in taxi (RPO 9C6) and police (RPO 9C1) Chevrolet Caprices. In 1986, the Chevrolet Astro and GMC Safari vans used the fuel-injected LB4 instead of the LB1. In 1987, the Chevrolet full-size pickups and vans were upgraded to use the LB4 throttle-body injection version of the 4.3 L (262 cu in). The mechanical fuel pump boss was retained but the hole was undrilled (marine applications had the fuel pump boss drilled and tapped).

From 1987 onwards, the LB4's output was 160 hp (119 kW) for pickups, while full-size vans were rated at 150 hp (112 kW). In 1988, the S-10/S-15 trucks, S-10 Blazer, and S-15 Jimmy had the LB4 4.3 L (262 cu in) as an available option (the accessory drive was upgraded to a serpentine belt drive), which later replaced the less powerful 60° V6 offering (2.8L). The LB4 continued until 1996 with minor variations in power, but without any major changes. While a majority of LB4s did not have a balance shaft, some 1994 model year engines may have a balance shaft since production of the cylinder block used on the L35 was phased in for both induction systems. The 1994 model year was the final time a non-balance shaft cylinder block was used; production 1995 TBI engines were all balance-shaft engines.

Year	Horsepower	Torque	Fuel System	Compression Ratio	RPO	Applications
1985–1986	155 hp (116 kW) @ 4000 rpm	230 lb⋅ft (312 N⋅m) @ 2400 rpm	4-barrel	9.3:1	LB1	1, 2, 3
1985	130 hp (97 kW) @ 3600 rpm	210 lb⋅ft (285 N⋅m) @ 2000 rpm	TBI	9.3:1	LB4	4, 5
1986–1990	140 hp (104 kW) @ 4000 rpm	225 lb⋅ft (305 N⋅m) @ 2000 rpm	TBI	9.3:1	LB4	4, 5
1987–1988	145 hp (108 kW) @ 4200 rpm	225 lb⋅ft (305 N⋅m) @ 2000 rpm	TBI	9.3:1	LB4	5
1986	160 hp (119 kW) @ 4000 rpm	235 lb⋅ft (319 N⋅m) @ 2400 rpm	TBI	9.3:1	LB4	3
1987–1992	155 hp (116 kW) @ 4000 rpm	230 lb⋅ft (312 N⋅m) @ 2400 rpm	TBI	8.6:1	LB4	2
1987–1992	160 hp (119 kW) @ 4000 rpm	235 lb⋅ft (319 N⋅m) @ 2400 rpm	TBI	9.1:1	LB4	1, 3, 6, 7
1993–1995	155 hp (116 kW) @ 4000 rpm	230 lb⋅ft (312 N⋅m) @ 2000 rpm	TBI	9.1:1	LB4	2
1993–1995	165 hp (123 kW) @ 4000 rpm	235 lb⋅ft (319 N⋅m) @ 2000 rpm	TBI	9.1:1	LB4	1, 3, 6, 7

Legend

- 1 – Chevrolet C/K trucks, GMC C/K trucks
- 2 – Chevrolet G-series vans, GMC G-Series vans
- 3 – Chevrolet Astro vans, GMC Safari vans (Note: LB1 for 1985 only and LB4 not available 1995)
- 4 – 1985 Chevrolet Impala, 1985–1988 Chevrolet Caprice, 1989–1990 Chevrolet Caprice police/taxi only, 1985–1986 Pontiac Parisienne
- 5 – 1985–1988 Chevrolet El Camino, GMC Caballero, Chevrolet Monte Carlo, 1986–1987 Pontiac Grand Prix (Note: 140 hp (104 kW) LB4 used 1986 only)
- 6 – 1988–1994 Chevrolet S-10 Blazer, GMC S-15 Jimmy, and 1991 Oldsmobile Bravada
- 7 – 1988–1995 Chevrolet S-10 and GMC S-15/Sonoma

==== LU2 ====
For the 1990–1991 model years, a high-output 4.3 L (262 cu in) V6 was an available option for the extended-length versions of the Chevrolet Astro and GMC Safari vans. The LU2 used unique hypereutectic, strutless pistons and a more aggressive camshaft. Like the LB4, the LU2 used throttle-body fuel injection, but was rated at 170 hp (127 kW) and 225 lb⋅ft (305 N⋅m) of torque. This engine was replaced in 1992 with the L35.

Year	Horsepower	Torque	Fuel System	Compression Ratio	RPO	Applications
1990–1992	170 hp (127 kW) @ 4600 rpm	225 lb⋅ft (305 N⋅m) @ 3400 rpm	TBI	9.1:1	LU2	1

Legend

- 1 – Chevrolet Astro vans, GMC Safari vans; optional on extended-length models only

==== L35 CPI ====
1992 introduced a new version of the 4.3 L (262 cu in), the L35. This version of the 4.3 L (262 cu in) was equipped with CPI (Central Port Fuel Injection). This system had one centrally located fuel injector to distribute fuel to six hoses each with a poppet valve to each of the intake ports. This system allowed for a multi-point fuel injection, using one injector. The fuel injection was a batch fire system and used a two-piece cast aluminum dual-plenum manifold. This engine was available in Chevrolet S-10/GMC Sonoma pickups, Chevrolet S-10 Blazer/GMC S-15 Jimmy/Oldsmobile Bravada SUVs, and Chevrolet Astro/GMC Safari vans only. The L35 was rated at 200 hp (149 kW) and 260 lb⋅ft (353 N⋅m) of torque.

The cylinder block was redesigned for use with a balance shaft. Cylinder heads (10238181 casting) used with the L35 have intake ports with eyebrows that clear the fuel injectors. Timing cover flange area was thickened in 1995 when some of the balance shaft motors had a six-bolt timing cover; some engines had a crankshaft position sensor (in conjunction with a redesigned distributor containing a pickup assembly which functions as a camshaft position sensor) when OBD-II was phased in.

Year	Horsepower	Torque	Fuel System	Compression Ratio	RPO	Applications
1992–1994	200 hp (149 kW) at 4,500 rpm	260 lb⋅ft (353 N⋅m) at 3,600 rpm	CPI	9.1:1	L35	1, 2, 3
1995	190 hp (142 kW) at 4,500 rpm	260 lb⋅ft (353 N⋅m) at 3,400 rpm	CPI	9.1:1	L35	1
1995	191 hp (142 kW) at 4,500 rpm	260 lb⋅ft (353 N⋅m) at 3,400 rpm	CPI	9.1:1	L35	3
1995	195 hp (145 kW) at 4,500 rpm	260 lb⋅ft (353 N⋅m) at 3,400 rpm	CPI	9.1:1	L35	2

Legend

- 1 – Chevrolet Astro vans, GMC Safari vans (Note: standard on AWD, optional on 2WD models)
- 2 – Chevrolet S-10 Blazer, GMC Jimmy, Oldsmobile Bravada (Note: Oldsmobile Bravada not produced in 1995)
- 3 – Chevrolet S-10, GMC Sonoma (engine standard equipment with the S10 SS and Sonoma GT)

==== L35 and LF6 SCPI and MPFI ====
Major design changes were made to the 4.3 L (262 cu in) V6 for the 1996 model year. Like other small block Chevrolet V8s, the 4.3 L (262 cu in) engine received redesigned heads which had improved airflow and combustion efficiency. These heads are referred to as Vortec heads.

The engine block was revised with structural reinforcing ribs up front eliminating the two freeze plugs (on the front and back) along with an alloy oil pan (for the S-10, Blazer, and Jimmy). The 1996+ cast aluminum oil pan has 12 bolts where a 16-bolt oil pan from the earlier 4.3 does not interchange. These 4.3 L (262 cu in) (1996–2000) engines came with a redesigned 4L60-E transmission with a removable bellhousing which bolts to the oil pan.

Crankshafts manufactured for the 1999 model year (to the end of 4.3 L (262 cu in) production) had a pilot hole depth of 1.41 in (35.8 mm) when coupled to the LSx-based 4L60E, which had a redesigned torque converter pilot hub (which was longer and was used with a 300 mm (11.8 in) stator shaft). The torque converter pilot hub was longer than the early 4L60E (similar in appearance to the 1993–1995 700R4) or the second generation variants (incorporating a removable bellhousing) with the GMT330 or 1996–1998 C/K series.

This engine came in two versions, the LF6 rated at 175–180 hp (130–134 kW), and the L35 rated at 180–200 hp (134–149 kW). Only the S-series pick-ups used the LF6, while the full-size trucks, vans and Blazer and Jimmy used the L35 version. The L35 was optional on the S-Series trucks.

Year	Horsepower	Torque	Fuel System	Compression Ratio	RPO	Applications
1996	170 hp (127 kW) at 4,400 rpm	235 lb⋅ft (319 N⋅m) at 2,800 rpm	SCPI	9.2:1	LF6	5
1997–2002	175 hp (130 kW) at 4,400 rpm	240 lb⋅ft (325 N⋅m) at 2,800 rpm	MPFI	9.2:1	LF6	5
1996–2002	180 hp (134 kW) at 4,400 rpm	240 lb⋅ft (325 N⋅m) at 2,800 rpm	SCPI	9.2:1	LF6	6
1996–2002	180 hp (134 kW) at 4,400 rpm	245 lb⋅ft (332 N⋅m) at 2,800 rpm	SCPI	9.2:1	L35	5
1996–2002	190 hp (142 kW) at 4,400 rpm	250 lb⋅ft (339 N⋅m) at 2,800 rpm	SCPI	9.2:1	L35	3, 4, 6
1996–2002	200 hp (149 kW) at 4,400 rpm	250 lb⋅ft (339 N⋅m) at 2,800 rpm	SCPI	9.2:1	L35	2
1996–1998	200 hp (149 kW) at 4,400 rpm	255 lb⋅ft (346 N⋅m) at 2,800 rpm	SCPI	9.2:1	L35	1
1999–2002	200 hp (149 kW) at 4,600 rpm	260 lb⋅ft (353 N⋅m) at 2,800 rpm	SCPI	9.2:1	L35	7

Legend

- 1 – Chevrolet/GMC C/K trucks
- 2 – Chevrolet Express/GMC Savana vans
- 3 – Chevrolet Astro/GMC Safari vans
- 4 – Chevrolet Blazer/GMC Jimmy, 1996–2001 Oldsmobile Bravada SUVs
- 5 – Chevrolet S-10/GMC Sonoma trucks (2WD)
- 6 – Chevrolet S-10/GMC Sonoma trucks (4WD)
- 7 – Chevrolet Silverado/GMC Sierra trucks

==== LU3 and LG3 MPFI ====
2002 (2003 Year Model, Vin Code X for LU3, Vin Code W for L35) saw major changes to the 4.3 L (262 cu in) fuel-injection system. For 2002, the Chevrolet Astro, GMC Safari, Chevrolet Silverado, and GMC Sierra all came equipped with the updated LU3 4.3 L (262 cu in) in California emissions states. 2003 saw the L35 discontinued and the LU3 replacing it in all other applications. A new variation was also introduced in 2003, the LG3. From 2004 to 2014, the LU3 was the only 4.3 L (262 cu in) produced.

The biggest change to the LU3 and LG3 was the fuel-injection system. These engines used a multipoint fuel-injection system, with six Multec II fuel injectors mounted at each intake port on the manifold. GM recommends the Multec II spider assembly (which is also available for the L30 and L31 small block V8 motors) as a replacement for the 1996–2002 SCPI injector/spider assembly since the poppet valves have been known to stick open. The sticking poppet valves have been attributed to ethanol fuel blends sold in the State of California. The composite upper intake manifold and cast aluminum lower intake from the L35 engine is also used on the LU3. The LG3 uses a cast aluminum upper intake and a cast iron lower intake. The lower intake eliminated the EGR valve.

The LU3 also received a "quiet cam" to help reduce vibration at both idle and high engine speeds. This camshaft used the same lift and duration as the older design, but the cam was reprofiled to keep the valve lifters in full contact with the cam lobes as the cam ramps down.

The LG3 was used in Chevrolet S-10 and GMC Sonoma pickups and was only produced for 2003. The LU3 was used in the Chevrolet and GMC full-size trucks and vans, the Chevrolet Astro and GMC Safari vans, and the Chevrolet S-10 Blazer and GMC S-15 Jimmy. The LG3 was rated at 180 hp (134 kW) and 245 lb⋅ft (332 N⋅m) of torque. The LU3 was rated at 190–200 hp (142–149 kW) and 250–260 lb⋅ft (339–353 N⋅m) of torque.

For the 2007–2013 GMT900 Silverado/Sierra 1500 trucks and 2008–2014 Express/Savana 1500 vans, the LU3 engine received a Distributorless Ignition System: the traditional distributor was eliminated where a stub shaft was used. In addition, the crankshaft sensor was upgraded to a 58x reluctor wheel (same as the GEN IV LSx) which resulted in the timing cover redesigned (this time, the cover is aluminum alloy in lieu of the composite cover); the timing cover bolt pattern is not the same as the 1996–06 LU3 and L35.

Year	Horsepower	Torque	Fuel System	Compression Ratio	RPO	Applications
2003	180 hp (134 kW) at 4,400 rpm	245 lb⋅ft (332 N⋅m) at 2,800 rpm	MPFI	9.2:1	LG3	5
2003–2005	190 hp (142 kW) at 4,400 rpm	250 lb⋅ft (339 N⋅m) at 2,800 rpm	MPFI	9.2:1	LU3	3, 4, 6
2002–2003	200 hp (149 kW) at 4,400 rpm	250 lb⋅ft (339 N⋅m) at 2,800 rpm	MPFI	9.2:1	LU3	2
2002–2003	200 hp (149 kW) at 4,600 rpm	260 lb⋅ft (353 N⋅m) at 2,800 rpm	MPFI	9.2:1	LU3	1
2004–2014	195 hp (145 kW) at 4,600 rpm	260 lb⋅ft (353 N⋅m) at 2,800 rpm	MPFI	9.2:1	LU3	1, 2

Legend

- 1 – Chevrolet Silverado and GMC Sierra 1500 trucks
- 2 – Chevrolet Express and GMC Savana vans
- 3 – Chevrolet Astro and GMC Safari vans
- 4 – Chevrolet Blazer and GMC Jimmy SUVs
- 5 – Chevrolet S-10 and GMC Sonoma trucks (2WD)
- 6 – Chevrolet S-10 and GMC Sonoma trucks (4WD)

==== Turbocharged LB4 4.3L V6 ====
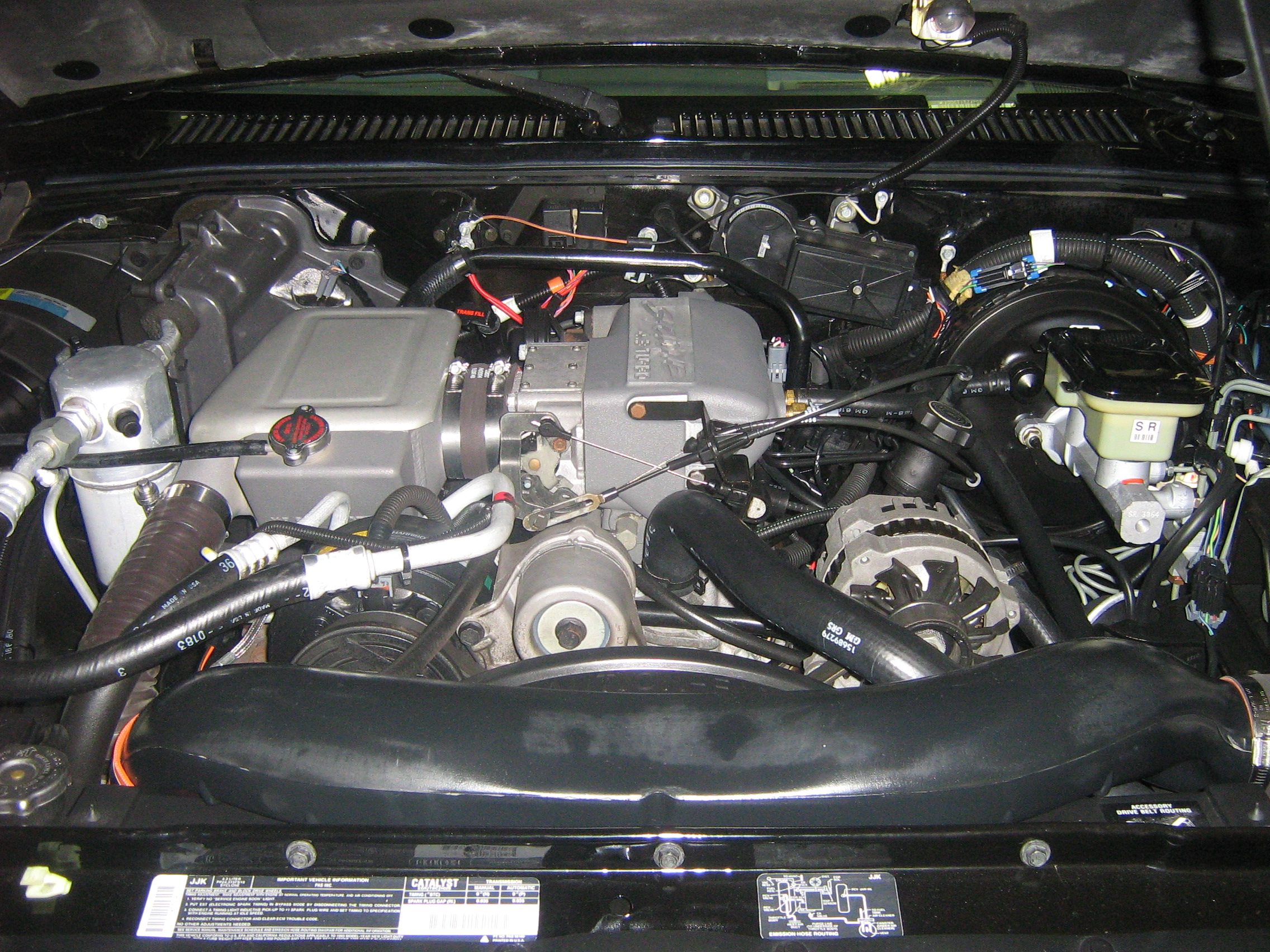
1993 GMC Typhoon engine

In 1991, GMC introduced the GMC Syclone limited-edition truck that used a turbocharged 4.3 L (262 cu in) V6. This engine used a Mitsubishi TD06-17C turbocharger, Garrett water/air intercooler, and electronic multi-point fuel injection. Although GM made these modifications to the engine, it was still referred to with the RPO LB4 code. The majority of the naturally aspirated LB4's long-block was shared with the turbo version. However, the vehicles that used the 4.3 L (262 cu in) turbo engine also included RPO code ZR9. Internal engine upgrades included nodular iron main bearing caps, graphite composite head gaskets with stainless steel flanges, and hypereutectic pistons which lowered the engine compression to 8.35:1. A unique intake manifold that used the 48 mm (1.9 in) twin-bore throttle body from the 5.7L TPI Corvette engine was used on the engine's top end.

The turbocharged 4.3 L (262 cu in) was last used in the GMC Typhoon in the 1993 model year. The engine produced 280 hp (209 kW) at 4400 rpm and 360 lb⋅ft (488 N⋅m) of torque at 3600 rpm.

=== Marine Applications ===
Mercury Marine, which sells its engines under the Mercruiser brand, developed the 4.5L V6 Mercruiser engine, producing 200 HP or 250 HP. It was based on the 4.3 L (262 cu in) architecture using similar dimensions, except that it has a stroke length of 3.6 inches.

== Generation V ==
=== 4.3L (262 CID) ===
Commencing with the 2014 model year, a new LV3 EcoTec3 4300, based on GM's GEN V (LT1) small-block V8, became the new base engine for the next-generation Chevrolet Silverado/GMC Sierra 1500 full-size trucks, and since 2018, it has become the new base engine for the Chevrolet Express/GMC Savana full-size vans. This aluminum block and head design was significantly different from the cast iron engine it replaced, signaling an end to a design dating back to 1955. Like its small-block V8 counterparts, GM Powertrain has also sold the engine for marine and industrial applications. This engine is manufactured in Tonawanda NY and Ramos Mexico.

==== LV3 ====
LV3/LV1

Overview
- Manufacturer: General Motors
- Also called: EcoTec3
- Production: 2013–present

Layout
- Configuration: 90° V6
- Displacement: 4.3 L; 262.5 cu in (4,301 cc)
- Cylinder bore: 99.6 mm (3.92 in)
- Piston stroke: 92 mm (3.62 in)
- Cylinder block material: Aluminum
- Cylinder head material: Aluminum
- Valvetrain: OHV 2 valves × cyl.
- Compression ratio: 11.0:1

Combustion
- Fuel system: Direct injection
- Management: E92
- Fuel type: Gasoline, E85
- Oil system: Wet sump
- Cooling system: Water-cooled

Output
- Power output: 285 hp (213 kW) (Gasoline); 297 hp (221 kW) (E85)
- Torque output: 305 lb⋅ft (414 N⋅m) (Gasoline); 330 lb⋅ft (447 N⋅m) (E85)

Chronology
- Predecessor: LU3 (Silverado/Sierra); L20 (Express/Savana)

The 4.3 L (262.5 cu in) LV3 V6 is an all-new engine announced by GM at the end of 2012. GM considers this a new engine design which inherits from its predecessors its displacement, 2-valve pushrod valvetrain, 90-degree cylinder angle, and 4.4 in (111.8 mm) bore centers. It is based on the fifth-generation LT engine and includes the same features such as direct injection, piston cooling jets, active fuel management, variable displacement oil pump, continuously variable valve timing, and aluminum cylinder heads and block. The engine is SAE certified to 285 hp (213 kW) at 5300 rpm and 305 lb⋅ft (414 N⋅m) at 3900 rpm on regular unleaded gasoline and 297 hp (221 kW) at 5300 rpm and 330 lb⋅ft (447 N⋅m) at 3900 rpm on E85. Emissions are controlled by a close-coupled catalytic converter, Quick Sync 58X ignition, returnless fuel rail, and fast-response O_{2} sensor. It was launched in the all-new 2014 Chevrolet Silverado and GMC Sierra 1500. 2021 was its final model year in the Chevrolet Silverado and GMC Sierra 1500, as the 6-speed automatic transmission was phased out. The Chevrolet Express and GMC Savana are the last vehicles to use the 4.3L but do not feature Active Fuel Management and their version of the engine is referred to as the LV1.

Applications:

- 2014–2021 Chevrolet Silverado 1500
- 2014–2021 GMC Sierra 1500

==== LV1 ====
The LV1 engine is essentially the same as the LV3, but without Active Fuel Management technology. The LV1 made its debut in the 2018 model year GM full-size vans—the 2018 Chevrolet Express and GMC Savana—as the successor to the 4.8L Vortec engine.

== See also ==
- Chevrolet small-block engine (first- and second-generation)
- General Motors LS-based small-block engine
- GM High Value engine, 3.5L and 3.9L V6s
- GM High Feature engine
