= GMC Syclone =

High-performance version of the GMC Sonoma pickup truck

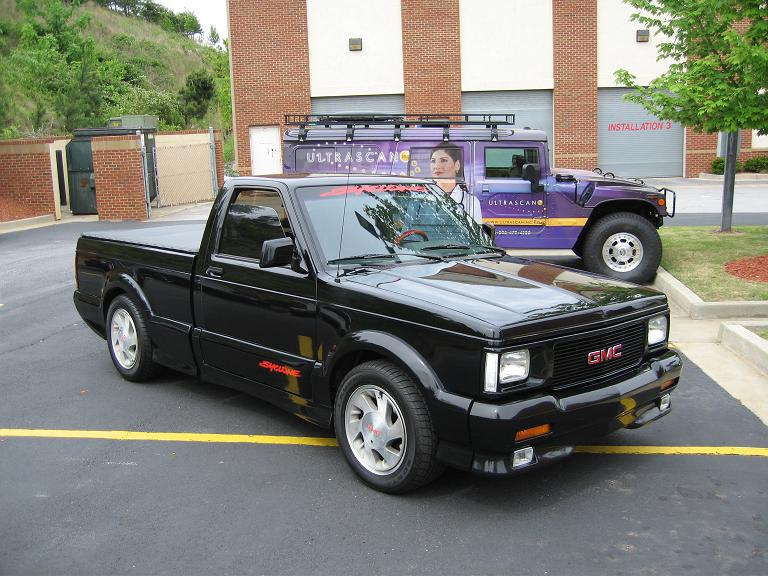

Overview
- Manufacturer: GMC (General Motors) and Production Automotive Services (PAS)
- Production: 1991 (2,995 produced); 1992 (3 produced)
- Designer: Kim Neilsen, William Davis

Body and chassis
- Class: Compact pickup truck
- Layout: Front-engine, four-wheel-drive
- Related: GMC Typhoon; GMC Sonoma GT; GMC Jimmy/Chevrolet S-10 Blazer; GMC Sonoma/Chevrolet S-10; Oldsmobile Bravada

Powertrain
- Engine: 4.3 L LB4 turbo V6
- Transmission: 4-speed 4L60 automatic

Dimensions
- Wheelbase: 108.3 in (2,751 mm)
- Length: 180.5 in (4,585 mm)
- Width: 68.2 in (1,732 mm)
- Height: 60.0 in (1,524 mm)
- Curb weight: 3521 lb (1597 kg)

The GMC Syclone is a high-performance version of the GMC Sonoma compact pickup truck. Produced in 1991 by GMC along with Production Automotive Services (PAS)—the same company credited with building the 1989 Pontiac Turbo Trans Am—the GMC Syclone was the fastest production truck for 1991. Following the Syclone's production, the similarly powered 1992–1993 GMC Typhoon SUV was based on the GMC Jimmy platform. Also following the Syclone, the 1992 GMC Sonoma GT truck was offered as a sport package with the looks of a Syclone but without the price and performance of its turbocharged predecessor. Only 806 Sonoma GTs were produced.

== Production run ==
The GMC Syclone, Typhoon, and Sonoma GT were built by GMC and PAS (Production Automotive Services) of Troy, Michigan, and sold through dealerships. At the time it was introduced, the Syclone was the fastest stock pickup truck being produced in the world. Auto magazines compared its acceleration favorably to a variety of sports cars including the Chevrolet Corvette and—in a memorable comparison test in Car and Driver magazine—a Ferrari 348 ts. The Syclone features a 4.3L turbocharged V6 engine with an automatic transmission and an AWD (all-wheel drive) driveline and 4-wheel anti-lock brakes.

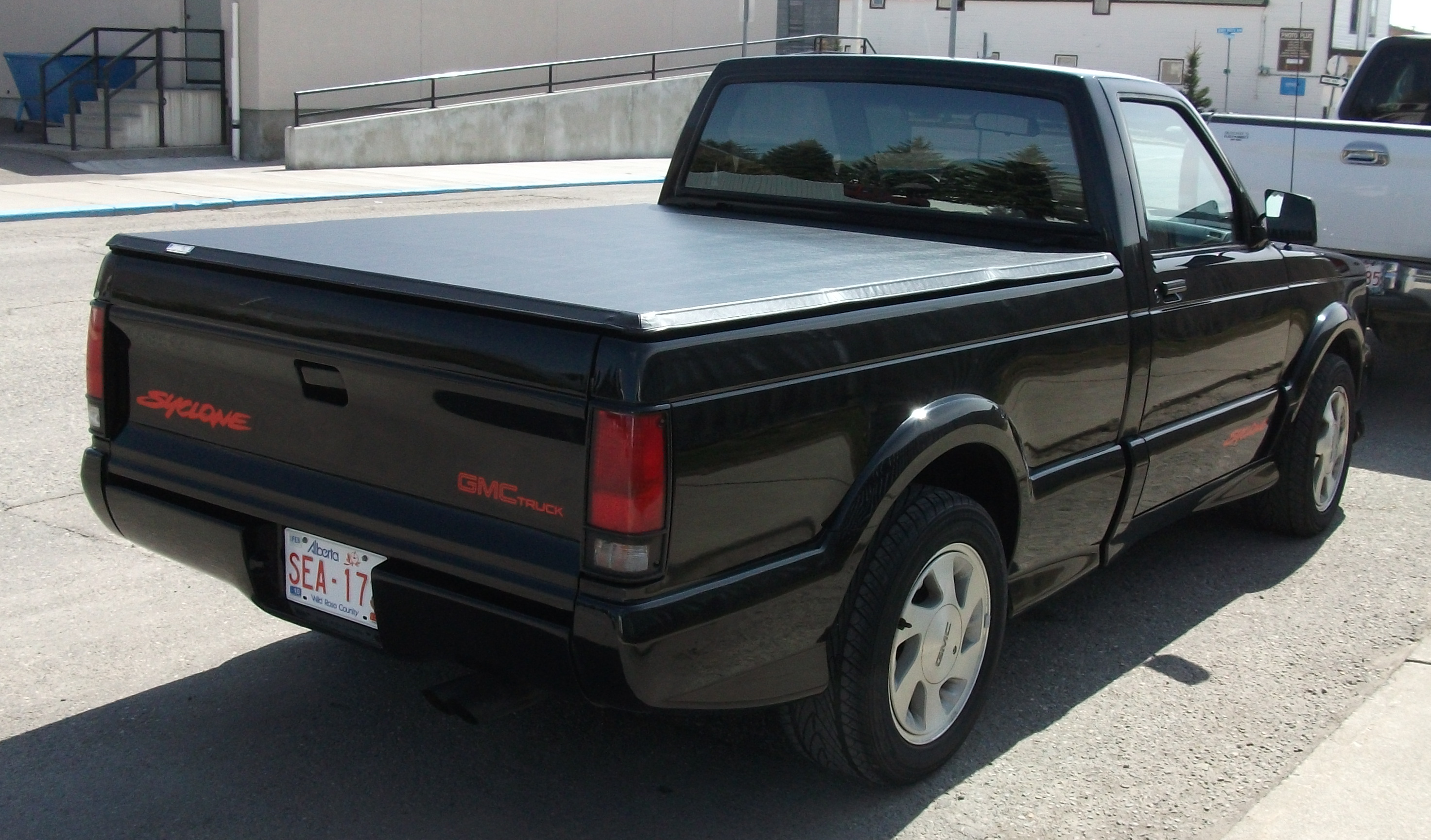
GMC Syclone rear

Both the Syclone and Typhoon trucks feature a Mitsubishi TD06-17C 8cm² turbocharger and Garrett water/air intercooler attached to a 4.3L LB4 V6 engine featuring upgrades that included hypereutectic pistons, nodular iron main caps, upgraded head gaskets, intake manifolds, exhaust manifolds, and a 48 mm (1.9 in) twin-bore throttle body from the 5.7L Chevrolet small-block engine. All Syclones and Typhoons used the 4L60 4-speed automatic transmission. A BorgWarner 4472 all-wheel-drive transfer case splits torque with 35% of power going to the front and 65% of power to the rear wheels. Both trucks featured sport modifications to the standard suspensions. The Syclone was the first production truck to receive a 4-wheel anti-lock braking system. With this engine, the Syclone produces 280 hp (209 kW) and 350 lb⋅ft (475 N⋅m) of torque. The Syclone, when new, was capable of accelerating from 0–60 mph (0–97 km/h) in 5.3 seconds and could do a quarter-mile run in 13.4 seconds at 98 mph (158 km/h) according to Car and Driver's comparison test.

The Syclone and Typhoon's gauge cluster is the same one as used in the Pontiac Sunbird Turbo, which was discontinued in 1990, one year before the Syclone was introduced.

The 1991 Syclone was only available in black. For the upcoming 1992 production, a wider range of colors was to be offered; however, the Syclone was cancelled before full production could begin. In total, 2,998 Syclones were built. Out of the 2,998, only three were built in 1992. The first 1992 Syclone was used for DOT crash testing while the remaining two are privately owned.

=== Saudi Syclone ===
During the 1991 Syclone production, roughly 150 Syclones were officially exported by GMC. Out of the 150 trucks, there were an estimated 113 destined for resale in the Middle East and were modified with a metric dash cluster, leaded fuel chip, and a resonator in place of the catalytic converter. These 113 trucks were shipped to Saudi Arabia to be sold as export sales. These 113 trucks were known as the Saudi Syclones. Not all of the exported Saudi Syclones were sold immediately overseas. Out of the 113 Saudi Syclones, 31 trucks remained unsold and were eventually brought back to the United States. Rather than selling the 31 trucks to the public, GMC set up a lottery where employees could enter their name to be drawn to have the chance at purchasing a Saudi Syclone as a significantly reduced price ($12,500) and had to take delivery through a dealership. It is alleged that not many employees knew of the lottery to purchase one of the Saudi Syclones, so almost everyone who entered got the chance to buy one, which upset a lot of GM employees in various other divisions who felt they missed out. The remaining 69 trucks were distributed throughout Europe for sale where a small number ended up in a German compound for sometime. GMC, desperate to be rid of them, sold them on a "make us an offer" basis. Lucky purchasers managed to get hold of one for a few thousand dollars under their market value.

In 2009, a poor-condition GMC Syclone was scrapped under the U.S. federal government Car Allowance Rebate System (colloquially known as "cash for clunkers"), despite being highly collectible.

== Special editions ==
There were two special-edition 1991 Syclones offered by third parties:

=== Marlboro Syclone ===
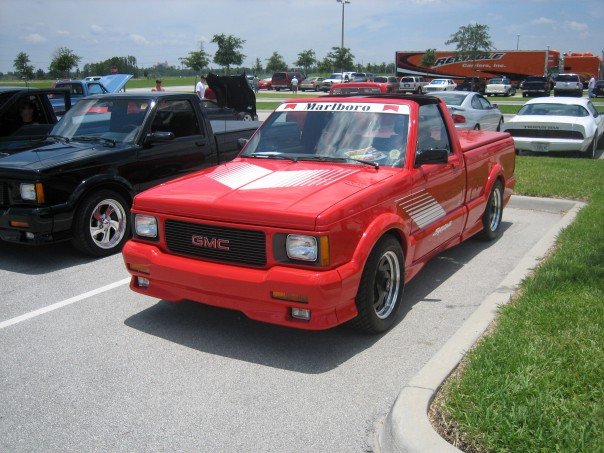
The 1991 Marlboro Syclone

The special-edition Marlboro Syclone was the grand prize for the ten winners of The Marlboro Racing '92 Contest. To enter the sweepstakes, a form was filled out which included a questionnaire. All ten trucks were provided to American Sunroof Company (ASC), by Shinoda Design Associates, Inc., in conjunction with Phillip Morris, Inc. With the help of Larry Shinoda, designer of the Corvette Stingray and Boss Mustang, a transformation of the originally black Syclones took place. All ten of the Marlboro Syclones were among the 2,995 Syclones built in 1991 and started life as a standard black production Syclone.

Marlboro Syclone custom features include:

- Targa-style roof panel with mounts in the pickup bed (roof converted by ASC)
- Slide-down rear window assembly (installed by ASC)
- Guidon hard tonneau cover
- Boyd Coddington "Cobra" wheels with Marlboro-emblem center caps and Goodyear Eagle GS-C tires
- PPG "Hot Licks" red paint, with white strobe stripes provided by Graphik Concepts
- Recaro leather seats with Simpson 5-point racing harness
- Custom MOMO "Evolution" steering wheel
- Sony sound system
- PROMPaq performance chip and Borla stainless steel exhaust
- Bell Tech suspension which lowered the truck by three inches

The ten grand prize winners of the Marlboro Sweepstakes not only won a 1991 GMC Syclone Marlboro Edition truck, but were treated to an all-expenses-paid day of racing alongside the Indy racing team and pit crew with a VIP access and tours, pit passes, photo session with the Marlboro Indy team, and a prize pack full of various Marlboro apparel. After the raffle had taken place and the trucks claimed by the winners, Phillip Morris had each truck delivered to an allocated dealership nearest to each winner’s residence. The winners were responsible for luxury taxes and fees.

=== Indy Syclone & PPG Syclone ===
PPG Syclone Pace Truck

Three Indy Syclones were used at the Indianapolis 500 race on May 24, 1992, with the only modification being a sticker package. One of these Indy trucks was later converted into the PPG Syclone Pace Truck (though it was not the official pace car) with significant modifications to be used on the track, including a multi-colored silver, magenta, and aqua paint scheme, and a molded in light bar in the roof, a racing fuel cell, a built-in halon fire suppression system, water-cooled brakes, and color-matched leather interior to the exterior paint scheme. The bed has a multi-piece tonneau cover that folds with the tailgate in the fashion of an accordion to reveal the fuel cell, batteries, and halon canister mounts. The PPG Syclone was retired to the GM Heritage Collection where it was stored and occasionally taken out for car shows until it was auctioned at Barrett Jackson in 2009, selling for $66,000. It is now privately owned, with its last location known to be in Colorado.
