= Oldsmobile Bravada =

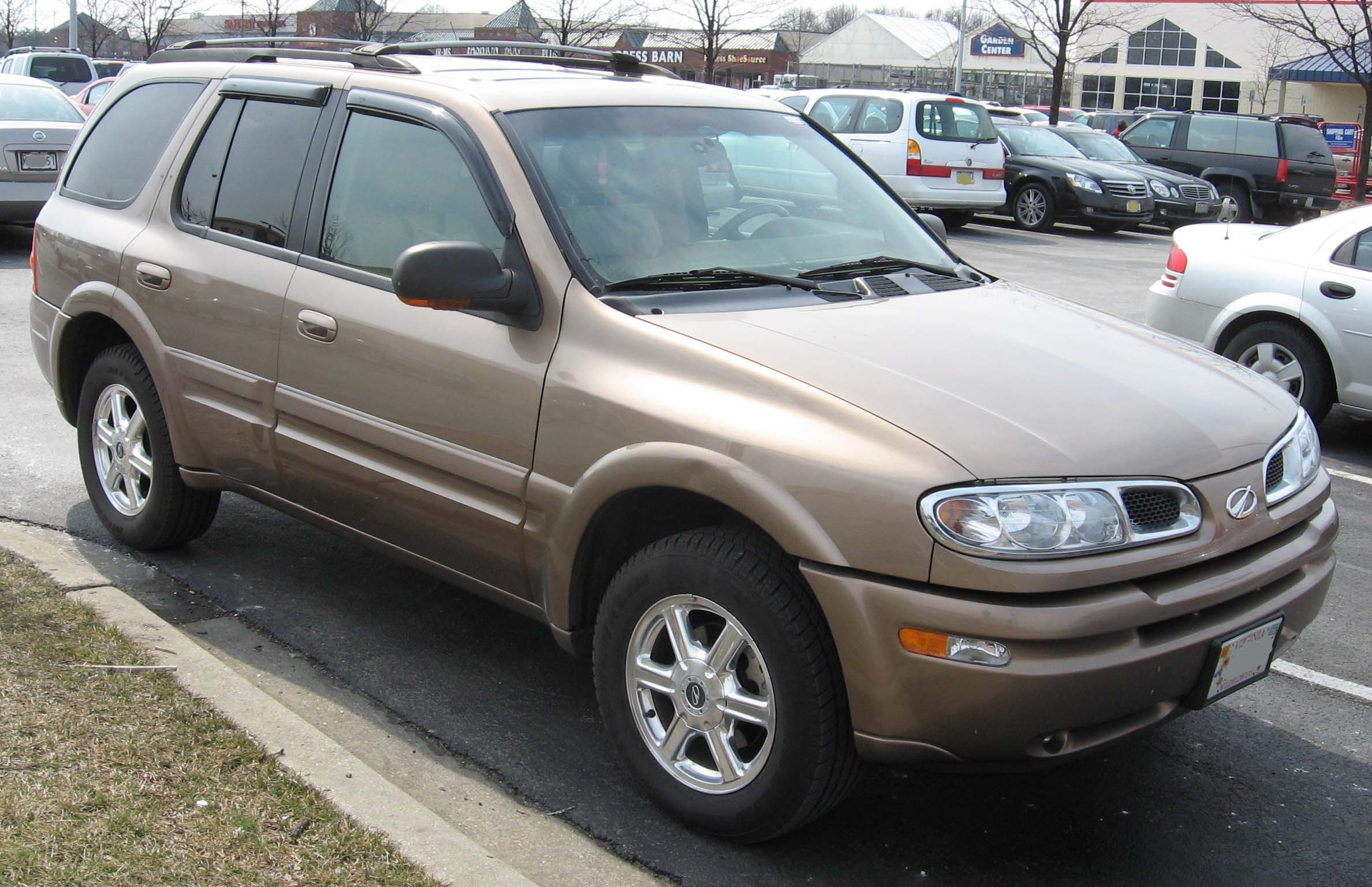

Overview
- Manufacturer: General Motors
- Production: 1990–2004
- Model years: 1991–1994; 1996–2004
- Assembly: United States: Moraine, Ohio (Moraine Assembly)

Body and chassis
- Class: Mid-size luxury SUV
- Body style: 4-door SUV
- Chassis: Body-on-frame

Powertrain
- Transmission: 4-speed automatic

Chronology
- Predecessor: Oldsmobile Custom Cruiser
- Successor: Buick Rainier; Saab 9-7X

The Oldsmobile Bravada is a mid-size luxury SUV that was sold by Oldsmobile from 1991 to 2004. The only SUV ever marketed by Oldsmobile, the Bravada was the first GM light truck since 1924 offered outside of the Chevrolet and GMC brands. Introduced as the flagship GM mid-size SUV, the Bravada was also the highest-content GM SUV prior to the 1999 introduction of the GMC Yukon Denali and Cadillac Escalade.

Offered solely as a five-door wagon, the Bravada was a counterpart of the Chevrolet (S-10) Blazer and GMC Jimmy for its first two generations. For its third generation, the model line was derived from the Chevrolet TrailBlazer and GMC Envoy.

For its entire production, the Bravada was sourced by GM from its Moraine Assembly facility (Moraine, Ohio). Following the retirement of the Oldsmobile brand after 2004, the Bravada lived on for 4 more years, as GM redeveloped it as the Buick Rainier and the Saab 9-7X (becoming the first SUV for both brands).

== First generation (1991–1994) ==
First generation
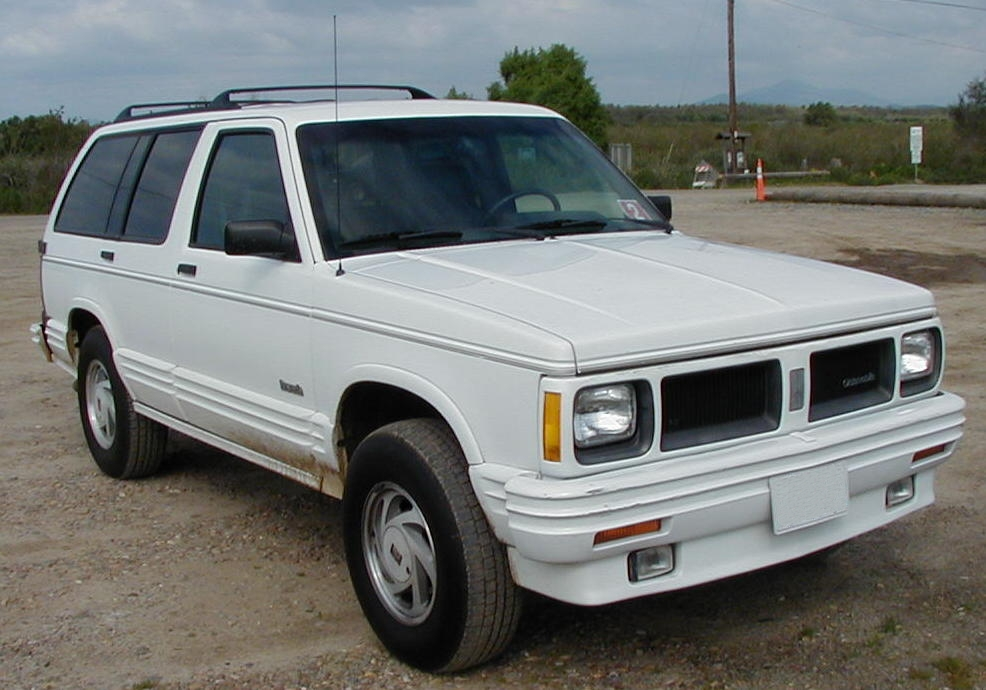

Overview
- Production: 1990 – December 1994

Body and chassis
- Body style: 4-door SUV
- Layout: Front-engine, all-wheel drive
- Platform: GM GMT330 platform
- Related: Chevrolet S-Blazer/GMC Jimmy; Chevrolet S-10/GMC Sonoma; GMC Typhoon/Syclone

Powertrain
- Engine: 4.3 L Vortec 4300 V6

Dimensions
- Wheelbase: 107.0 in (2,718 mm)
- Length: 178.9 in (4,544 mm)
- Width: 65.2 in (1,656 mm)
- Height: 65.5 in (1,664 mm)

For 1991, Oldsmobile introduced the Bravada as its first-ever sport-utility vehicle. Launched alongside the newly introduced four-door version of the Chevrolet S-10 Blazer, the Bravada was the first Oldsmobile truck-based vehicle since the 1920s. In contrast to its divisional counterparts, the Bravada was sold only as a four-door SUV; no two-door body nor any pickup truck version was produced. The first generation was sold exclusively in the United States.

The first luxury SUV produced by GM, the Bravada was designed with its a distinctive exterior separate from its divisional counterparts. In contrast to the larger Jeep Grand Wagoneer (discontinued after 1991), the Bravada was not fitted with wagon-style woodgrain exterior trim; instead, the body adopted a nearly monochromatic appearance with lower body cladding (similar to the GMC Typhoon). A body-color headlight surround was styled with a traditional Oldsmobile split grille; aluminum wheels were standard equipment. Other standard features included standard remote keyless entry, anti-lock brakes (ABS), and the use of SmartTrak all-wheel drive.

As with its Chevrolet/GMC counterpart, the Bravada was fitted with a standard 4.3L V6; for 1992, its output was increased from 160 hp to 200 hp. In contrast to the part-time four-wheel drive system of the Blazer/Jimmy, the Bravada was fitted with SmartTrak full-time all-wheel drive. Shared with the GMC Typhoon and the AWD Astro/Safari vans, SmartTrak used a BorgWarner 4472 transfer case; though forgoing low-range gearing, the system offered a 65%/35% rear/front torque split, shifting it when the system detected slippage.

During its production, the first-generation Bravada underwent minor detail changes. For 1992, the instrument panel was revised to further distinguish itself from the Blazer/Jimmy. For 1993, an overhead console was added (including a compass, temperature, and reading lights). As an option, a Gold package featured gold-colored badging and wheels.

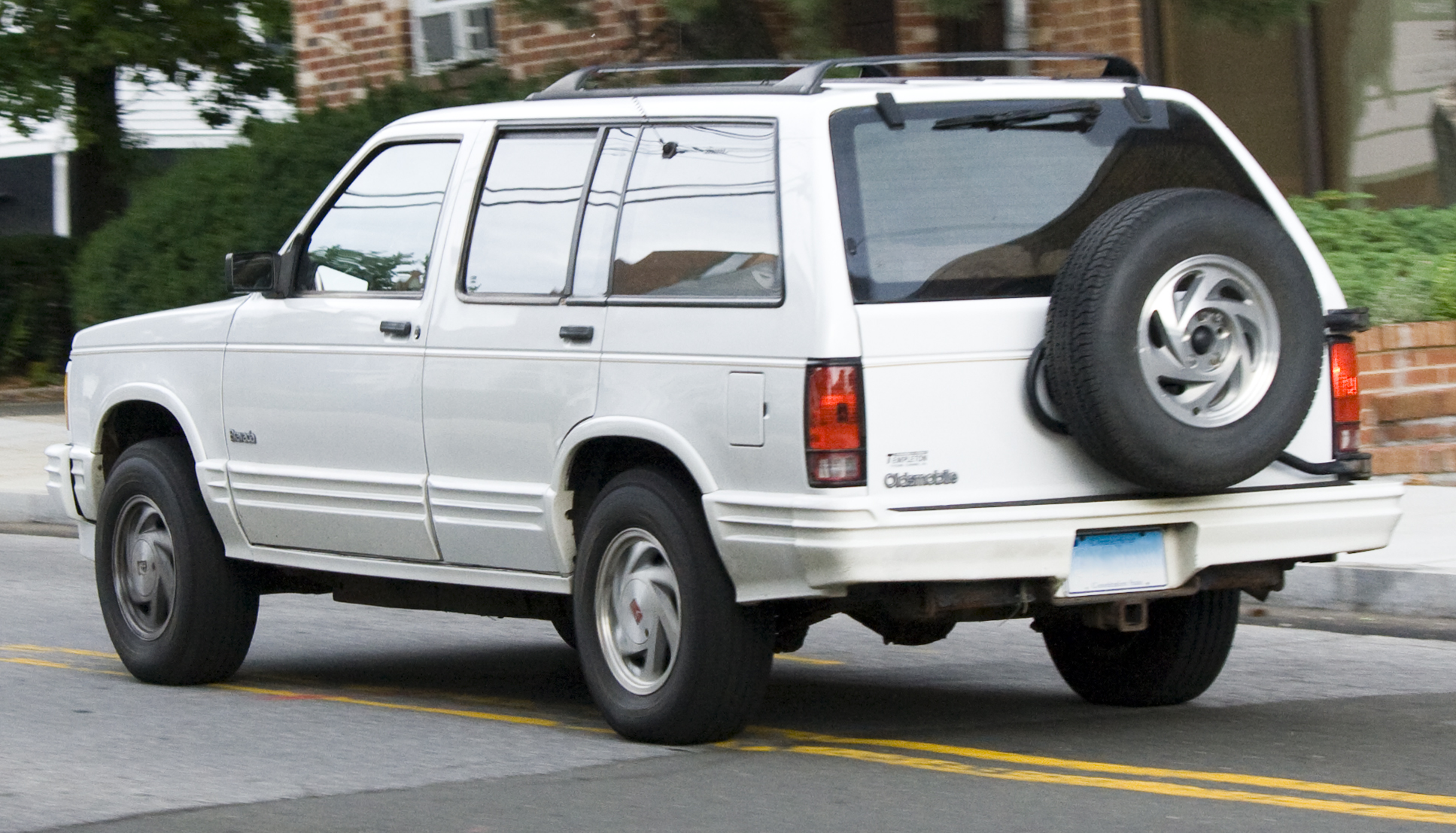
Rear view of Oldsmobile Bravada

=== Engines ===
- 1991 – 4.3 L LB4 V6, TBI, 160 hp (119 kW)/230 lb·ft (312 N·m) (VIN Z)
- 1992–1994 – 4.3 L L35 Vortec 4300 V6, CPFI, 200 hp (149 kW) (VIN W)

=== Fuel economy ===
According to the United States Environmental Protection Agency, the first-generation Bravada averaged 14–15 miles per US gallon (17–16 L/100 km; 17–18 mpg_{‑imp}) in the city, and 20 miles per US gallon (12 L/100 km; 24 mpg_{‑imp}) on the highway.

== Second generation (1996–2001) ==
Second generation
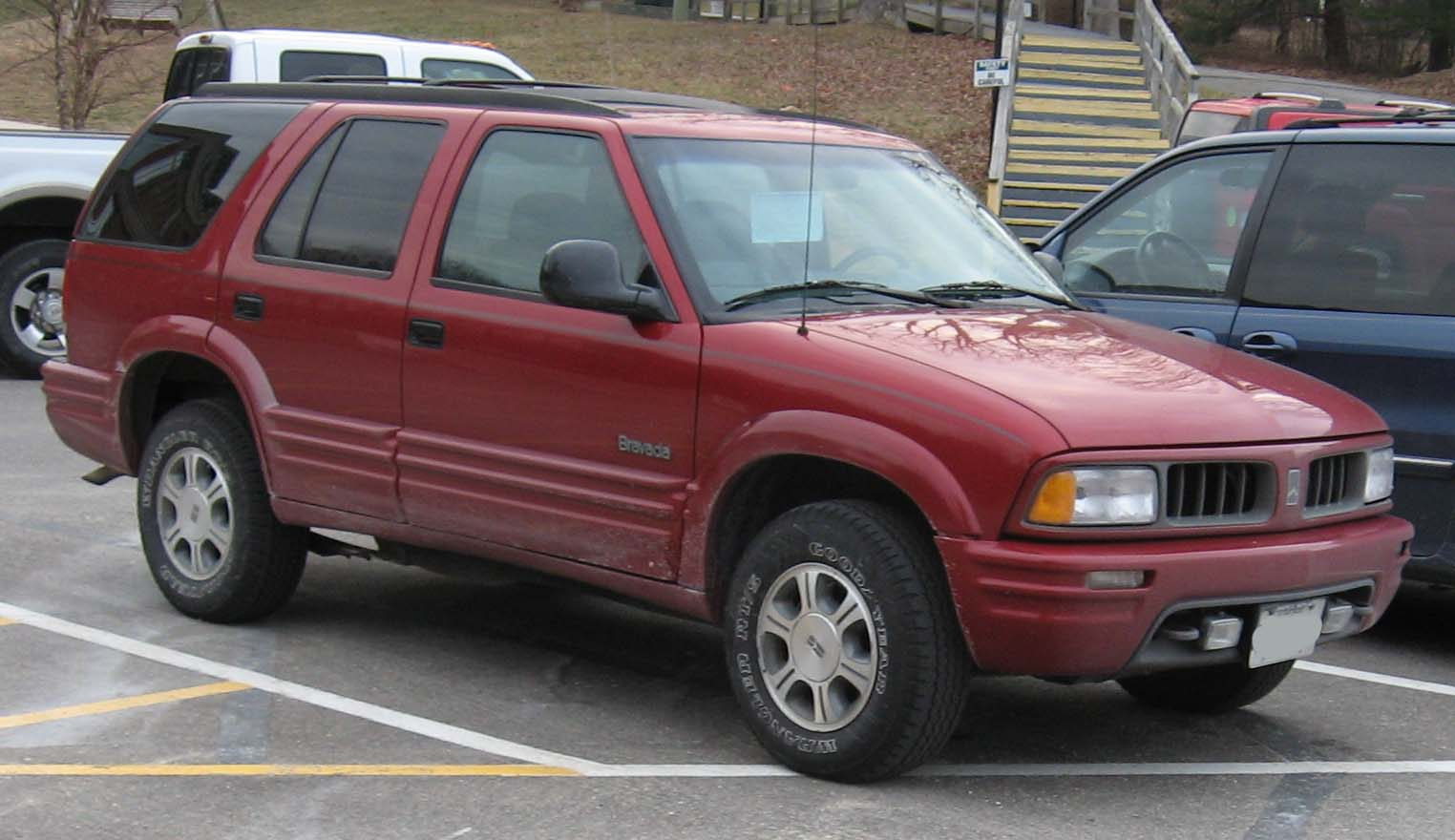

Overview
- Production: 1995–2001

Body and chassis
- Body style: 4-door SUV
- Layout: Front-engine, all-wheel drive
- Platform: GM GMT330 platform
- Related: Chevrolet Blazer/GMC Jimmy; Chevrolet S-10/GMC Sonoma; Isuzu Hombre

Powertrain
- Engine: 4.3 L Vortec 4300 V6

Dimensions
- Wheelbase: 107.0 in (2,718 mm)
- Length: 1996–97: 180.9 in (4,595 mm); 1998–2001: 183.7 in (4,666 mm)
- Width: 1996–97: 66.5 in (1,689 mm); 1998–99: 67.6 in (1,717 mm); 2000–01: 67.8 in (1,722 mm)
- Height: 1996–99: 63.2 in (1,605 mm); 2000–01: 64.4 in (1,636 mm)

After skipping the 1995 model year, Oldsmobile released its second-generation Bravada for 1996. Again sharing a body with the Chevrolet Blazer/GMC Jimmy, the Bravada was again produced only in a four-door body configuration. Distinguished by its lower bodyside trim (matching the bumpers) and the split front grille, the Bravada was fitted with six-spoke aluminum wheels (in line with the Oldsmobile Aurora).

Though sharing a dashboard with its counterparts (with driver-side airbag), the Bravada was fitted with woodgrain trim, leather seats, and interior trim (styled similarly to the Aurora), and a console-mounted transmission shifter (becoming a special-edition option on the Blazer in 1999).

Retuned to 190 hp (142 kW), the 4.3-liter V6 with sequential central port injection was again the standard engine, still fitted with the SmartTrak all-wheel drive system as standard. For 1997, four-wheel disc brakes (with ABS) became standard; the rear spoiler was deleted.

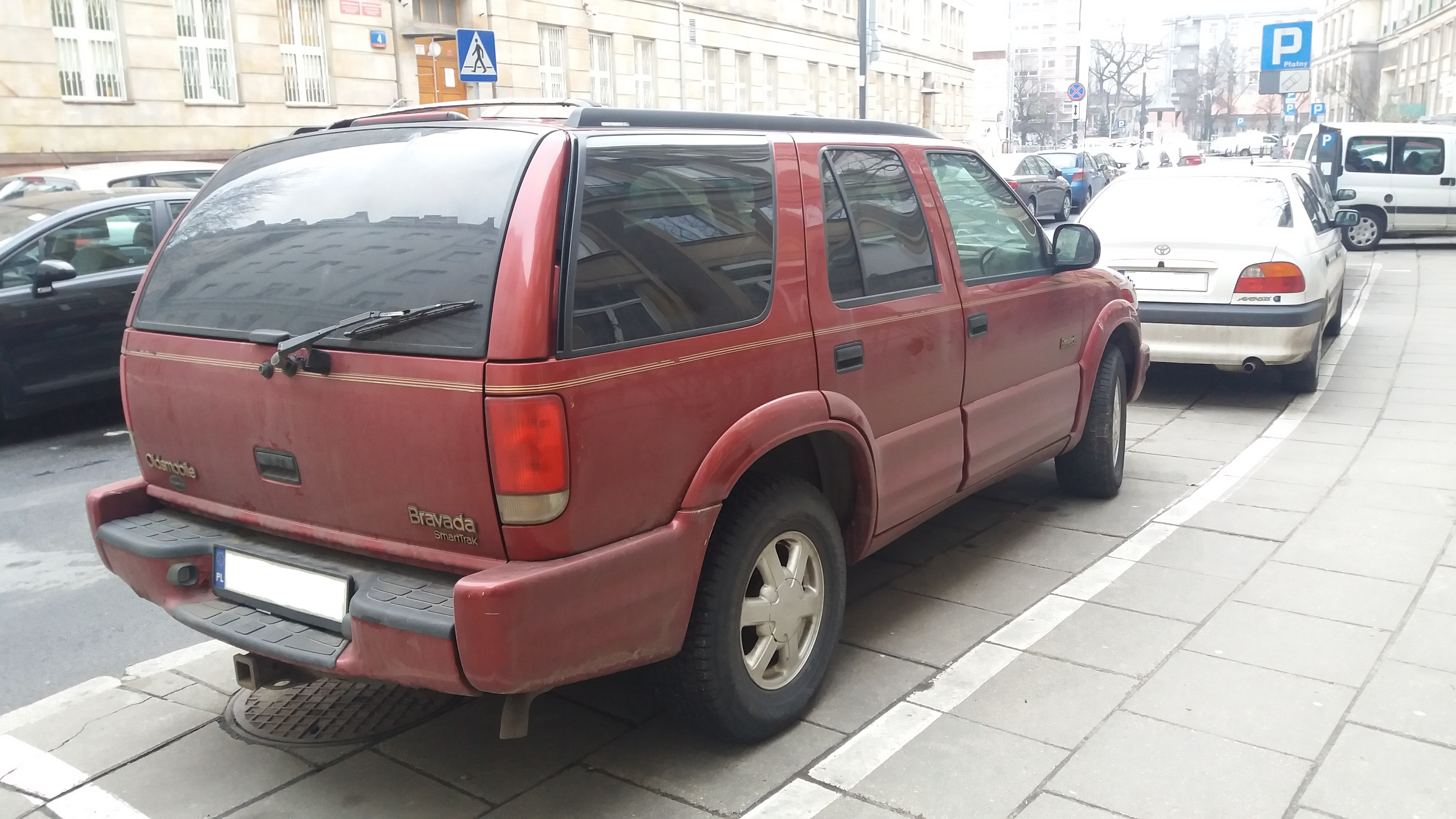
Oldsmobile Bravada rear

=== 1998 ===
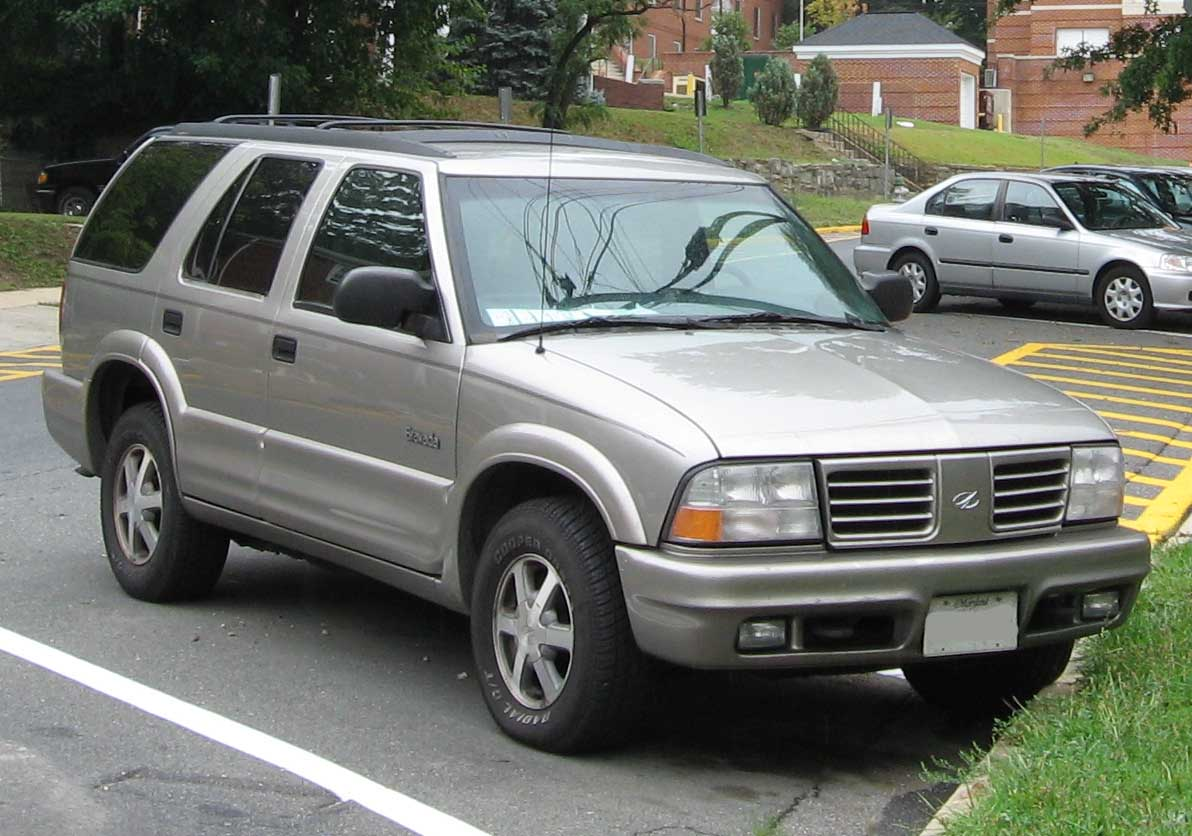
1998–2001 Bravada

For 1998, the second-generation Bravada underwent a mid-cycle facelift. Along with redesigned bumpers and lower body trim, the front fascia was redesigned with a larger grille, replacing the Oldsmobile "Delta Rocket" emblem with the new "Rocket O" emblem. The interior was revised, adopting heated seats and a dual-airbag dashboard. The SmartTrak system underwent a redesign, adopting the computer controlled NP-136 transfer case. In the interest of fuel economy, the system operated as rear-wheel drive in normal operations, sending torque to the front wheels only when detecting wheel slip.

For 1999, OnStar was introduced as a cellular-phone unit; in 2001, the system was integrated into the rearview mirror with available features like hands-free calling and virtual advisor. A Bose sound system also became an available option for 1999.

For 2000, a two-tone exterior option was introduced for the first time (named the Platinum Edition).

=== Fuel economy ===
According to the United States Environmental Protection Agency, the second-generation Bravada averaged 14–15 miles per US gallon (17–16 L/100 km; 17–18 mpg_{‑imp}) in the city, and 18–20 miles per US gallon (13–12 L/100 km; 22–24 mpg_{‑imp}) on the highway.

== Third generation (2002–2004) ==
Third generation
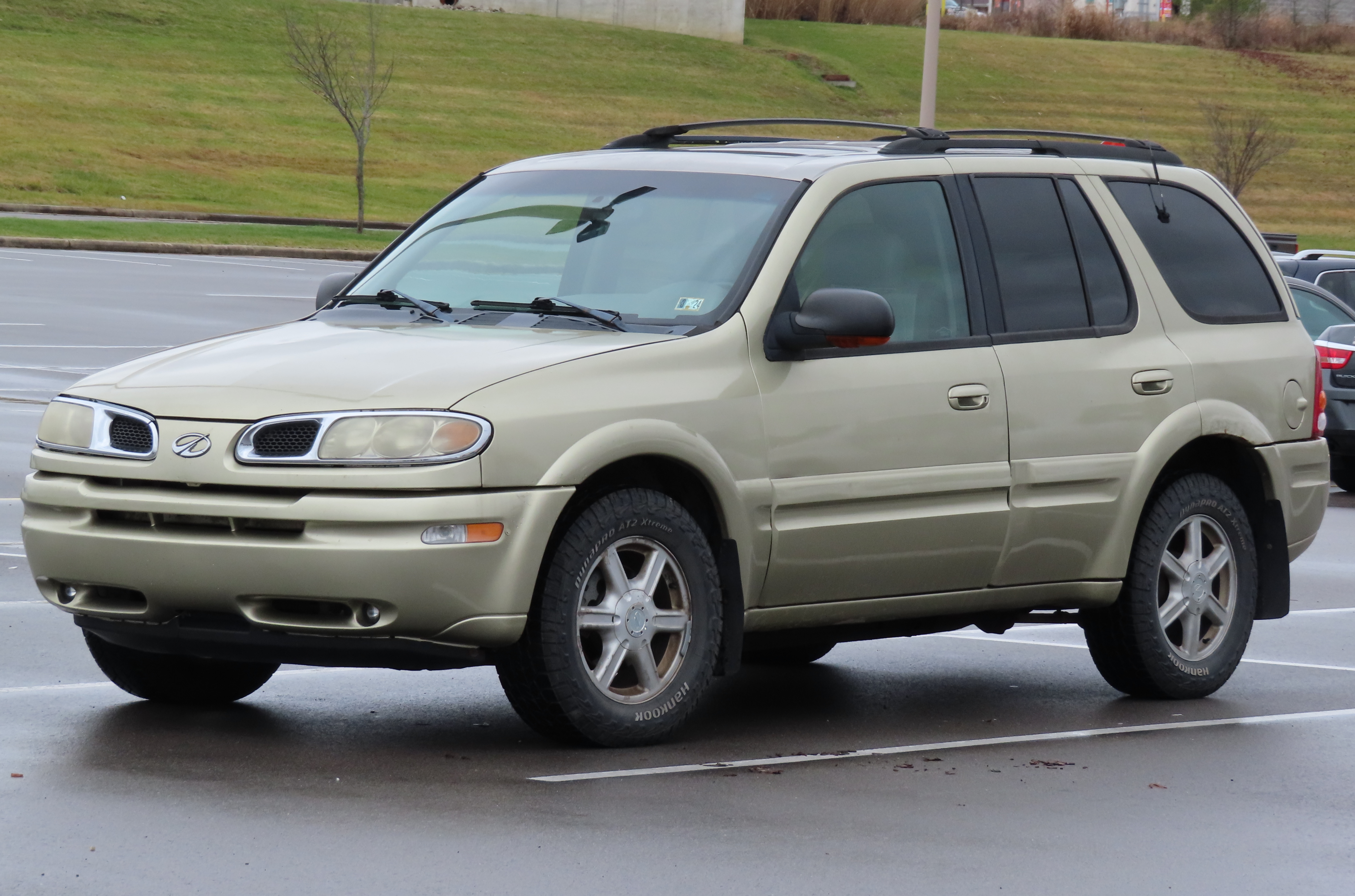

Overview
- Production: February 2001 – January 12, 2004
- Model years: 2002–2004
- Designer: Bill Davis

Body and chassis
- Body style: 4-door SUV
- Layout: Front-engine, rear-wheel drive/Front-engine, all-wheel drive
- Platform: GMT360
- Related: Chevrolet SSR; Chevrolet TrailBlazer; GMC Envoy; Buick Rainier; Isuzu Ascender; Saab 9-7X

Powertrain
- Engine: 4.2 L (253.9 cu in) Atlas I6

Dimensions
- Wheelbase: 113.0 in (2,870 mm)
- Length: 191.8 in (4,872 mm)
- Width: 75.4 in (1,915 mm)
- Height: 74.5 in (1,892 mm)

Oldsmobile launched the third generation of the Bravada in February 2001 for the 2002 model year. Serving as the launch model of the all-new GMT360 architecture (a platform dedicated to mid-size SUVs), the Bravada was now the counterpart of the Chevrolet TrailBlazer, GMC Envoy, and Isuzu Ascender. Now fitted with a distinct body (sharing only its doors with the GMC Envoy), the model line was styled in line with the Oldsmobile Aurora and Alero sedans, including a rounded front fascia and integrating the grilles into the bumpers and headlamp clusters. Reportedly, the only parts that remained from the previous generation were the automatic transmission and the transfer case on four-wheel-drive models.

The GMT360 platform brought several functional changes to the model line. A rear-wheel drive layout, with traction control, became standard for the first time (making it the first rear-wheel-drive Oldsmobile since the 1992 Custom Cruiser), with all-wheel drive retained as an option. The 4.3-liter V6 was retired in favor of a 270 hp (201 kW), 4.2-liter Atlas inline-six (RPO LL8) (the first Oldsmobile to offer such a layout since the 1976 Omega).

In contrast to its Chevrolet, GMC, or Isuzu counterparts, the Bravada was not offered in a long-wheelbase, seven-passenger configuration, nor with a 5.3L V8 engine.

The launch of the GMT360 Bravada coincided with the retirement of the Oldsmobile division, with the vehicle ending production after only three model years. On January 12, 2004, the final Oldsmobile Bravada rolled off the assembly line. The last 500 examples were produced as Final 500 Special Editions; each example featured custom seat embroidering and exterior badging inspired by vintage Oldsmobile logos, dark cherry metallic paint, unique chrome alloy wheels, and a medallion identifying the production number of the vehicle (1 to 500).

Though GM discontinued the Oldsmobile Bravada, its body lived on in two different vehicles: the Buick Rainier (2004–2007) served as its direct replacement with the flagship Saab 9-7X (2005–2009) also using its bodyshell.

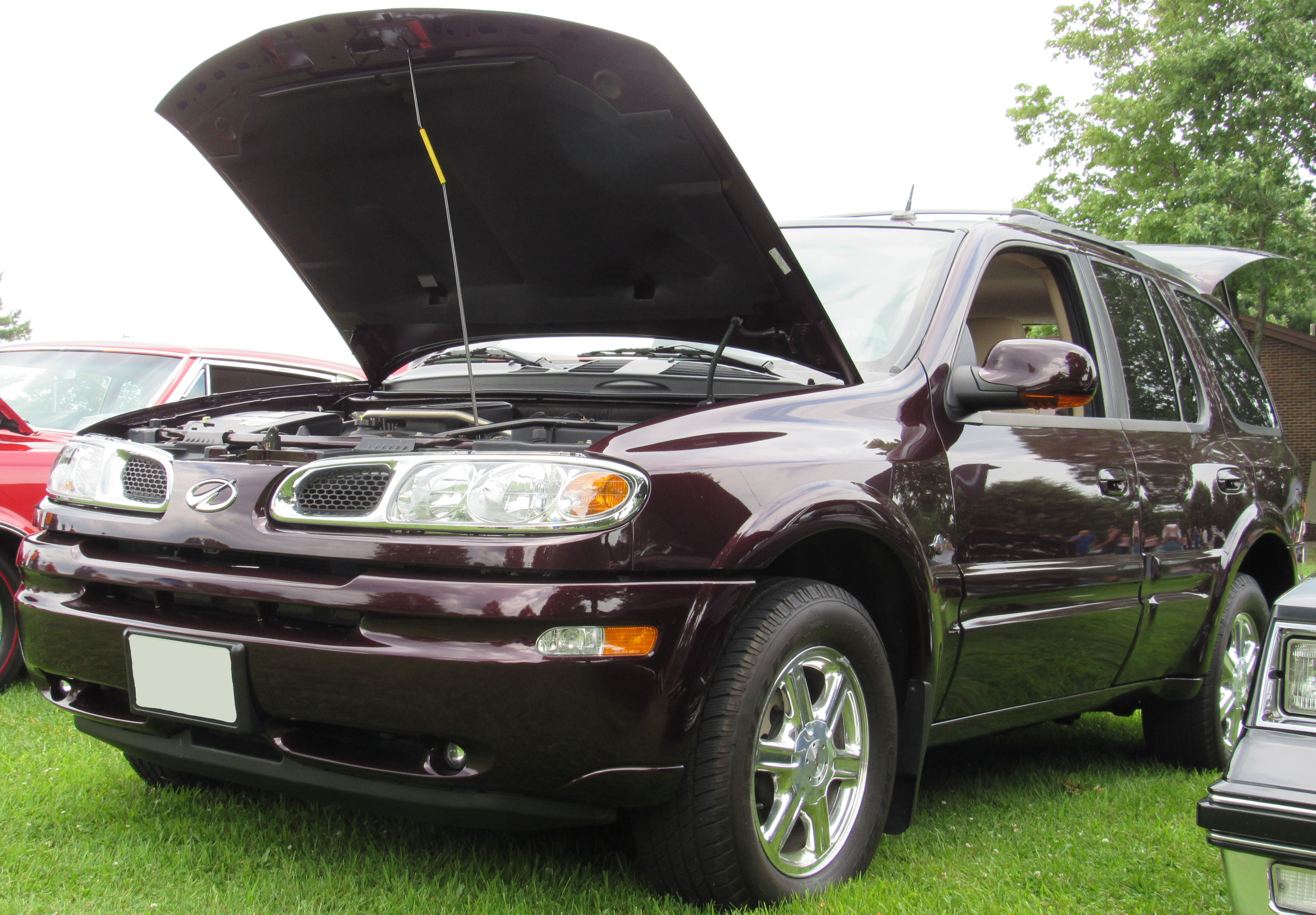
An example of a 2004 "Final 500" model.

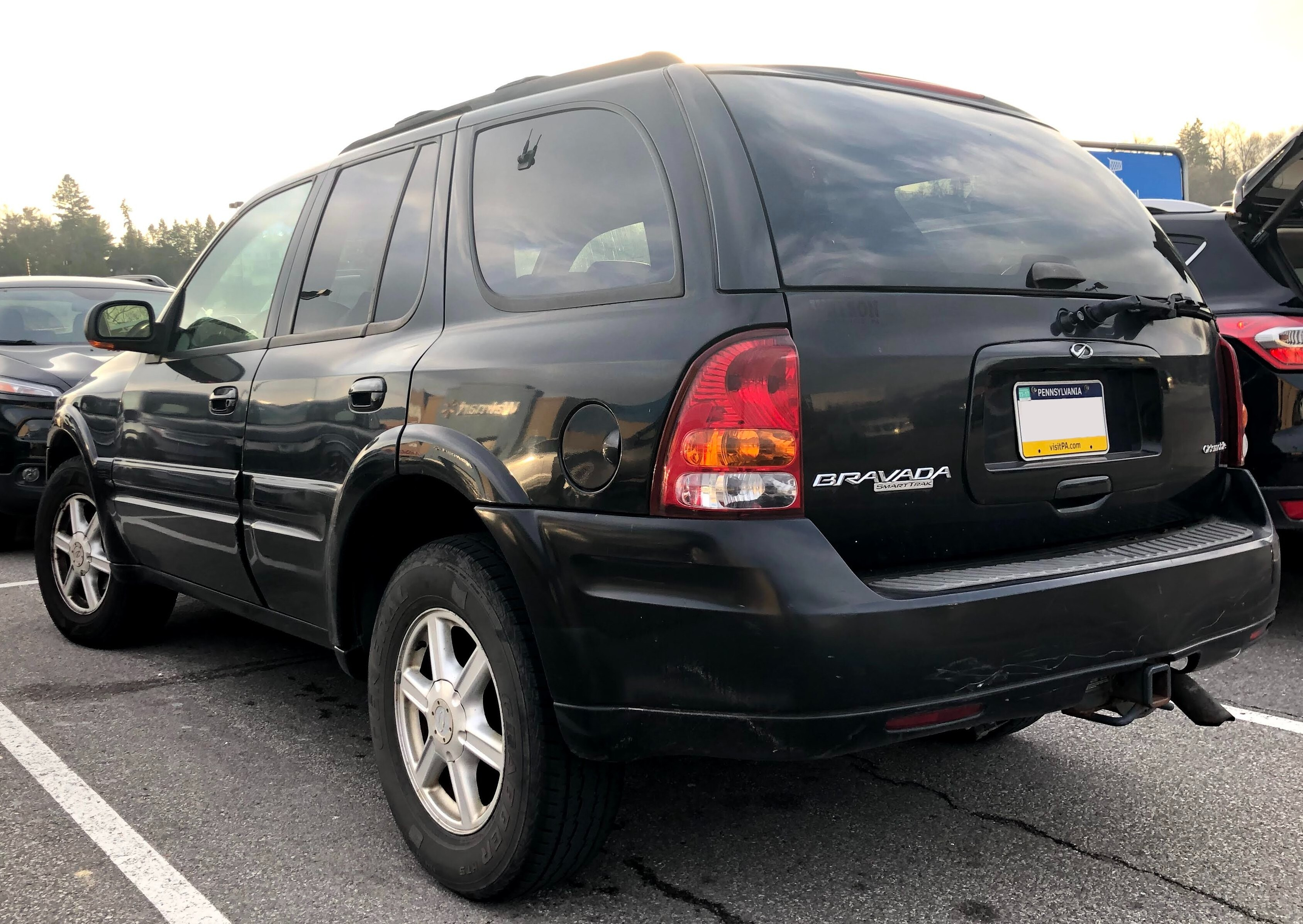
Rear view

=== Fuel economy ===
According to the United States Environmental Protection Agency, the third-generation Bravada averaged 13–14 miles per US gallon (18–17 L/100 km; 16–17 mpg_{‑imp}) in the city, and 19–20 miles per US gallon (12–12 L/100 km; 23–24 mpg_{‑imp}) on the highway.

== Sales ==
Sales by calendar year:

Calendar year	Units
1996	15,471
1997	28,481
1998	30,202
1999	29,258
2000	31,194
2001	23,867
2002	14,337
2003	8,052
2004	1,973
2005	327
Total	183,162
