= GMC Typhoon =

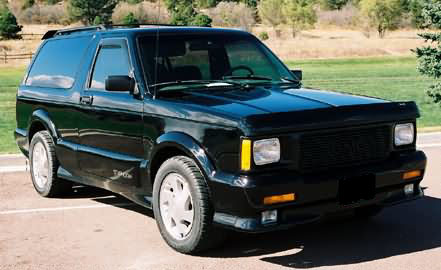

Overview
- Manufacturer: GMC (General Motors)
- Production: 1992–1993; 4697 produced

Body and chassis
- Class: Mid-size SUV
- Body style: 2-door SUV
- Layout: Front-engine, four-wheel-drive
- Related: GMC Syclone; GMC Jimmy/Chevrolet Blazer; GMC Sonoma/Chevrolet S-10; Oldsmobile Bravada

Powertrain
- Engine: 4.3 L GM LB4 Turbocharged V-6
- Transmission: 4-speed 4L60 automatic

Dimensions
- Wheelbase: 100.5 in (2553 mm)
- Length: 170.3 in (4326 mm)
- Width: 68.2 in (1732 mm)
- Height: 60.0 in (1524 mm)
- Curb weight: 3822 lb (1734 kg)

The GMC Typhoon is a high-performance SUV, produced from 1992 until 1993 by GMC. The Typhoon was based on the 1991 GMC Syclone.

== Description ==
Like the GMC Syclone, the Typhoon is powered by a 4.3 L LB4 V6 engine with unique pistons, main caps, head gaskets, intake manifolds, fuel system and exhaust manifolds, producing 280 hp (209 kW) and 360 lb⋅ft (475 N⋅m) of torque. The engine is a modified version of the Vortec engine found in the standard Jimmy, which originally produced 190 hp (142 kW). The engine uses a Mitsubishi TD06-17C/8 cm^{2} turbocharger producing 14 psi (0.97 bar) of boost and a Garrett Water/Air intercooler, as well as revised intake manifolds, fuel system, exhaust manifolds, and a 48 mm (2 in) twin-bore throttle body from the 5.7 L GM Small-Block engine. The Typhoon sends power to all four wheels through a 4L60 4-speed automatic transmission and a BorgWarner 4472 transfer case splitting torque with 35% forward and 65% to the rear wheels. Other features include upgraded brakes, a limited-slip rear differential and sport modifications to the standard suspensions. Unlike the Syclone, the Typhoon featured an air-operated self-leveling rear suspension.

During tests by Car and Driver, the Typhoon was capable of accelerating from 0–60 mph (0–97 km/h) in 5.3 seconds and could do a quarter-mile run in 14.1 seconds at 95 mph (153 km/h). Car and Driver compared the Syclone's performance favorably to the Ferrari 348ts, Chevrolet Corvette, and Nissan 300ZX Turbo. It cost US$29,970, though the magazine criticized the plastic interior pieces.

== Production and colors ==
All three model years were built for GMC by Production Automotive Services of Troy, Michigan. Aside from a handful of prototypes, only 4,697 Typhoons were built by GMC: 2,497 for 1992, and 2,200 for 1993. Unlike regular production Syclones, Typhoons were offered in various exterior color configurations (body color/lower-body cladding color) that differed by year, with black/black being the most common.

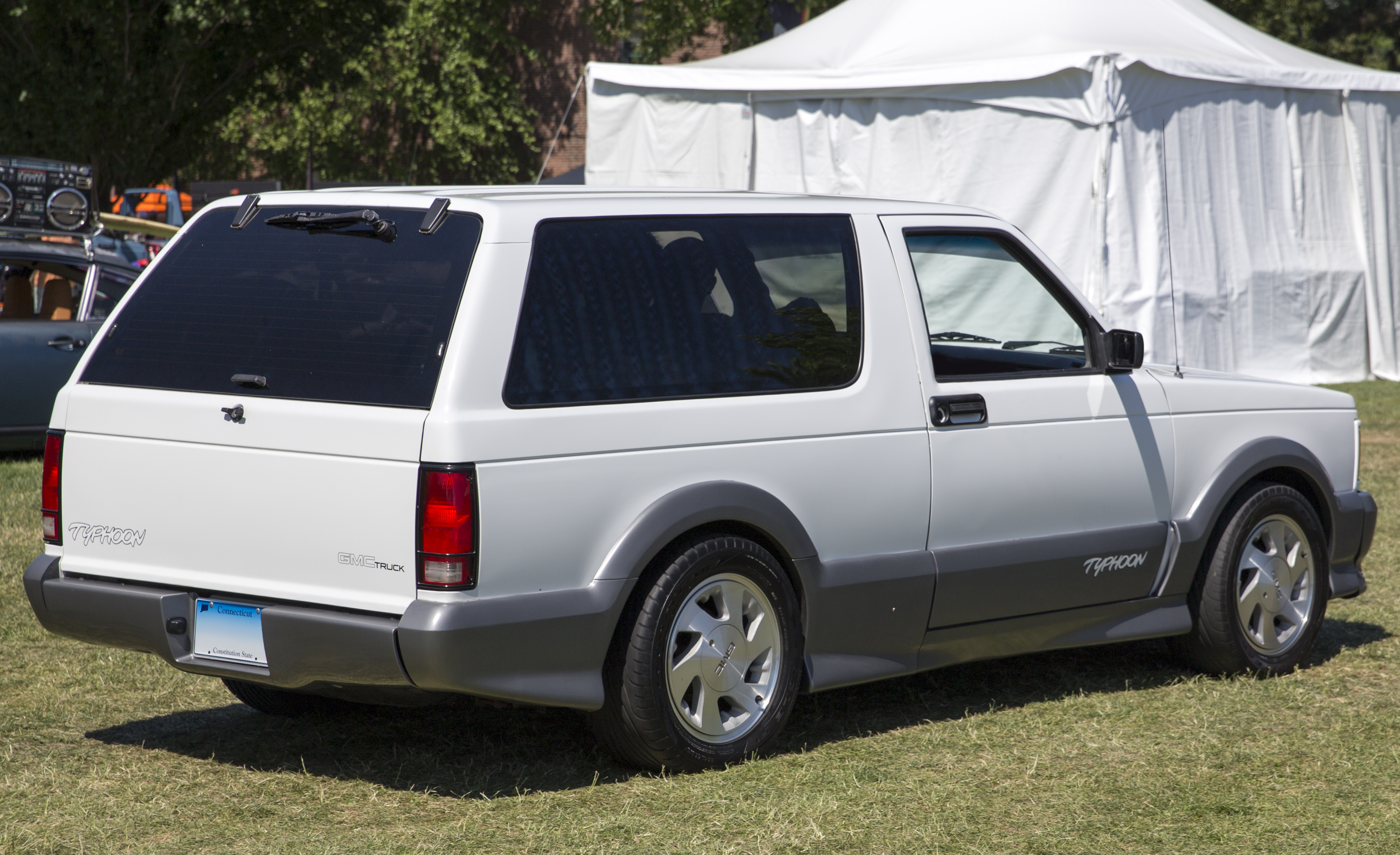
1992 GMC Typhoon in Frost White

1991

- Typhoon Pre-Production (6 total)

1992

- Midnight Black with Black (1,262 total (Note: Total includes 1 Raspberry Metallic w/ Raspberry Metallic factory test color truck.))
- Midnight Black with Gray (130 total)
- Frost White with Gray (518 total (Note: Total includes 2 Raspberry Metallic w/ Raspberry Metallic and 1 Radar Blue w/ Radar Blue factory test color truck.))
- Apple Red with Gray (345 total)
- Bright Teal with Gray (132 total)
- Forest Green Metallic with Gray (82 total)
- Aspen Blue with Gray (28 total)
- Raspberry Metallic with Raspberry Metallic (3 total (Note: These factory test colors are included in the totals of the original color combinations.))
- Radar Blue with Radar Blue (1 total)

1993

- Midnight Black with Black (1,008 total)
- Midnight Black with Gray (98 total)
- Frost White with White (532 total (Note: Total includes 1 Radar Blue w/ Radar Blue factory test color truck.))
- Frost White with Gray (115 total)
- Apple Red with Apple Red (77 total)
- Apple Red with Gray (101 total)
- Forest Green Metallic with Gray (210 total)
- Garnet Red with Gray (24 total)
- Royal Blue Metallic with Gray (35 total)
- Radar Blue with Radar Blue (1 total)
