= Moraine Park =

Moraine Park may refer to:

== Places and locations ==
- Moraine Park (Colorado) in Rocky Mountain National Park
- Moraine Park Museum and Amphitheater, located in Moraine Park in Rocky Mountain National Park
- Moraine Air Park in Ohio
- Moraine View State Recreation Area in Illinois

== Parks ==
- Moraine Hills State Park in Illinois
- Moraine State Park in Pennsylvania

== Schools ==
- Moraine Park Technical College in Wisconsin

== Attractions ==
- Splash Moraine, a water park in Ohio
