= Splash Moraine =

Former water park in Ohio, US

Coordinates: 39.685310°N 84.244987°W

Splash Moraine is an abandoned outdoor water park located in Moraine, Ohio (a suburb of Dayton, Ohio). It has been closed since 2009.

== Park information ==
=== Attractions ===
There were several attractions at Splash Moraine. Attractions located in the park were as follows:

- A 20,000-square-foot (1,900 m^{2}) wave pool
- Two 25-foot (7.6 m) tube water slides
- A kiddie area that was 4,000-square-foot (370 m^{2})
- A 700-linear feet lazy river with free tubes.
- Also located in the park were a sand volleyball court and a basketball court.
- Concessions were also provided to customers within the park.

In addition to these attractions, there were also various special events throughout the year. The most popular of these was Soggy Doggy Day, in which the pool was open for dogs and their owners only.

Due to budget cuts, the city has kept the park closed since 2009.

== See also ==
- List of waterparks
