= Chevrolet S-10 Blazer =

Chevrolet (S-10) Blazer GMC (S-15) Jimmy
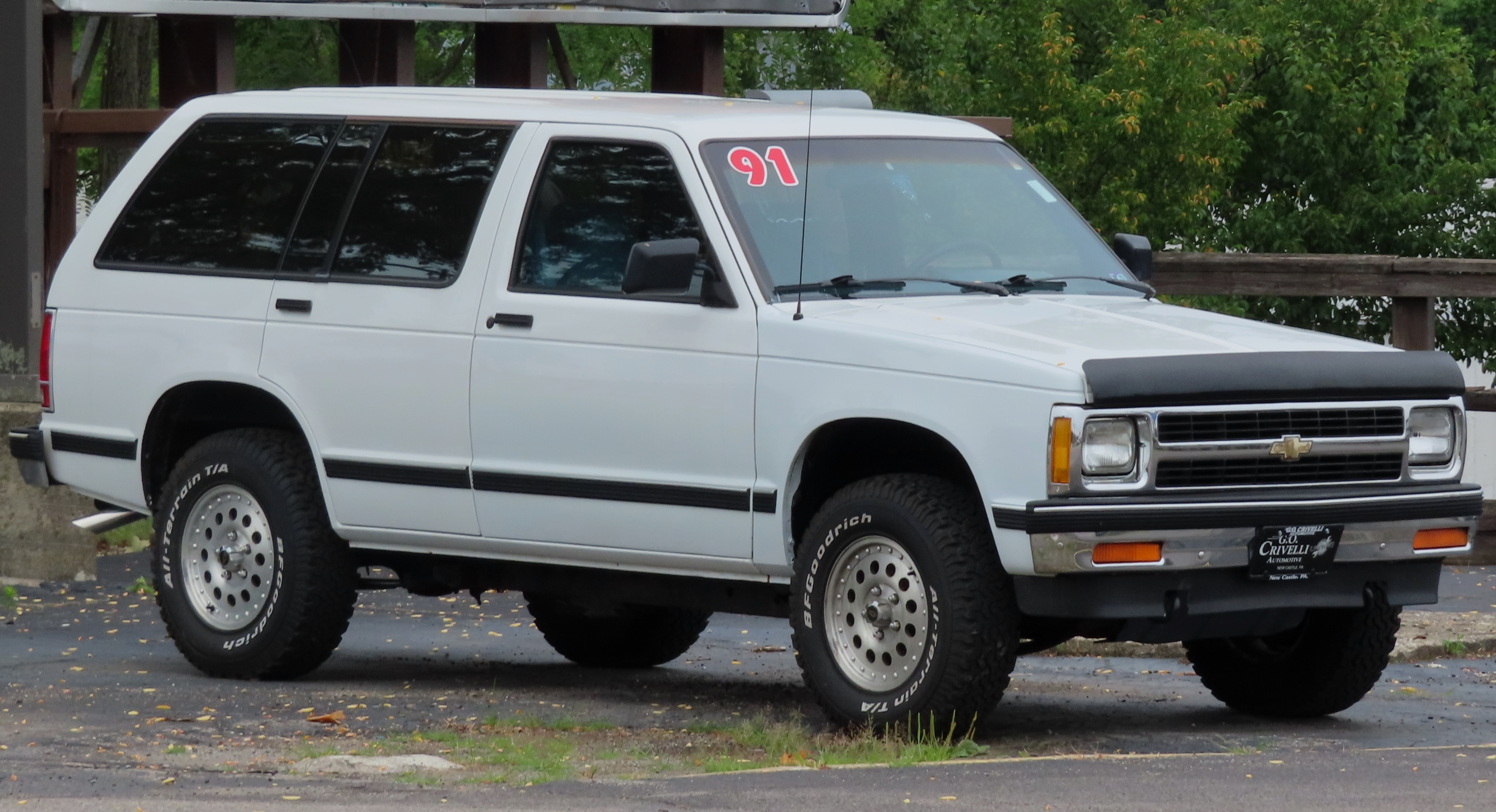
- 1991 Chevrolet S-10 Blazer Tahoe

Overview
- Manufacturer: General Motors
- Model years: 1983–2005 (North America)

Body and chassis
- Class: Compact SUV; Mid-size SUV
- Body style: 2-door SUV; 4-door SUV
- Layout: Front-engine, rear-wheel-drive / four-wheel-drive
- Chassis: Body-on-frame

Powertrain
- Transmission: 4-speed automatic 5-speed NV3500 manual

Dimensions
- Wheelbase: 2-door: 100.5 in (2,553 mm); 4-door: 107 in (2,718 mm)

Chronology
- Successor: Chevrolet Equinox (compact); GMC Envoy (Jimmy); Chevrolet TrailBlazer (mid-size)

The Chevrolet (S-10) Blazer and its rebadged GMC (S-15) Jimmy counterpart are compact/mid-size SUVs manufactured and marketed by Chevrolet and GMC from the 1983 through 2005 model years, over two generations – until the early 1990s alongside these brands' full-size SUVs with near identical nameplates, but lacking removable hardtops. From the 1992 model year, GMC's full-size Jimmy had become the "Yukon", and so, the S-15 prefix was dropped on the smaller GMC Jimmy. Starting with the 1995 second generation, the large Blazer was rebranded as the Chevrolet Tahoe, and these mid-size SUVs were simply launched as the "all-new Chevrolet Blazer".

Upon launch, these models were 14.5 in (37 cm) shorter and 14.9 in (38 cm) narrower than the full-size K5 Blazer, sometimes leading to the nickname of "baby Blazer". Like their full-sized counterparts, the S-series Blazer and Jimmy were originally offered only in a two-door body style. In 1991, four-door versions were added, with a 6.5 in (17 cm) longer wagon body.

The S-10 Blazer and S-15 Jimmy were based on the Chevrolet S-10 and GMC S-15/Sonoma pickup trucks and were manufactured in Pontiac, Michigan; Linden, New Jersey; Moraine, Ohio; Shreveport, Louisiana; and São José dos Campos, Brazil.

In the United States, retail sales of four-door Blazer models ended in 2004, though production of two- and four-door models for fleet sales continued into 2005. In the Canadian market, four-door models of the Blazer and Jimmy were sold until the 2004 model year and until the 2005 model year for the two-door models of both.

The Brazilian variant, based on the second-generation S-series, continued in production in Brazil through 2012 with its own sheetmetal stampings which were also used on the Chinese, Indonesian, and Russian versions. In North America, the Moraine, Ohio, plant produced only 4-door vehicles, with both 2- and 4-door models being produced at Linden, which was the main assembly plant after the switch (for the 1995 model year) from Pontiac West Assembly in Pontiac, Michigan, which closed in 1994.

== First generation (1983–1994) ==
First generation
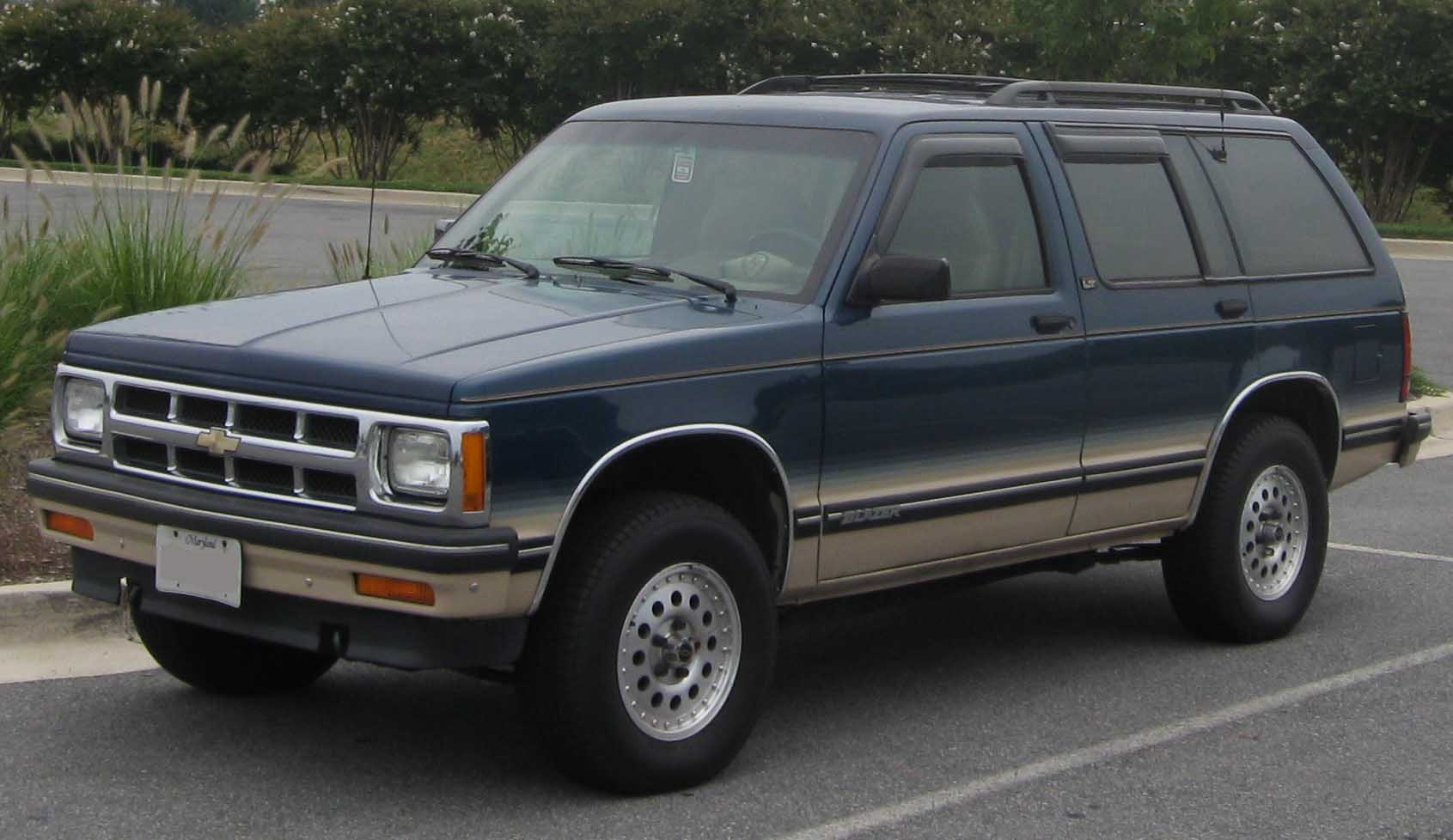
- 1991–1994 Chevrolet S-10 Blazer

Overview
- Also called: GMC Jimmy (1992–1994); Chevrolet S-Blazer (1993–1994)
- Production: 2-door: 1982–1994; 4-door: 1990–1994
- Model years: 1983–1994
- Assembly: United States: Shreveport, Louisiana (Shreveport Operations); Pontiac, Michigan (Pontiac West Assembly); Moraine, Ohio (Moraine Assembly); Venezuela: Valencia (GM Venezuela)

Body and chassis
- Body style: 2-door SUV; 4-door SUV (1991–1994)
- Layout: Front-engine, rear-wheel-drive / four-wheel-drive
- Platform: GM GMT330 platform
- Related: Oldsmobile Bravada (1991–1994); GMC Typhoon; Grumman LLV

Powertrain
- Engine: Gasoline: 1.95 L (119 cu in) Isuzu LR1 I4; 2.0 L (121 cu in) LG2 OHV I4; 2.2 L (134 cu in) LN2 I4; 2.5 L (151 cu in) LN8/L38 I4; 2.8 L (173 cu in) LR2/LL2 V6; 4.3 L (262 cu in) LB4/L35 V6; Diesel: 2.2 L (137 cu in) LQ7 I4
- Transmission: 700R4/4L60 (1983–1992); 4L60-E (1993–1994); BorgWarner T-4 (1982–1983); BorgWarner T-5; Getrag (HM)290/5LM60 (1990–1992); NV3500 (1993–1994)

Dimensions
- Wheelbase: 2-door: 100.5 in (2,553 mm); 4-door: 107.0 in (2,718 mm)
- Length: 2-door: 170.3 in (4,326 mm); 4-door: 176.8 in (4,491 mm)
- Width: 65.4 in (1,661 mm)
- Height: 4WD: 64.3 in (1,633 mm)

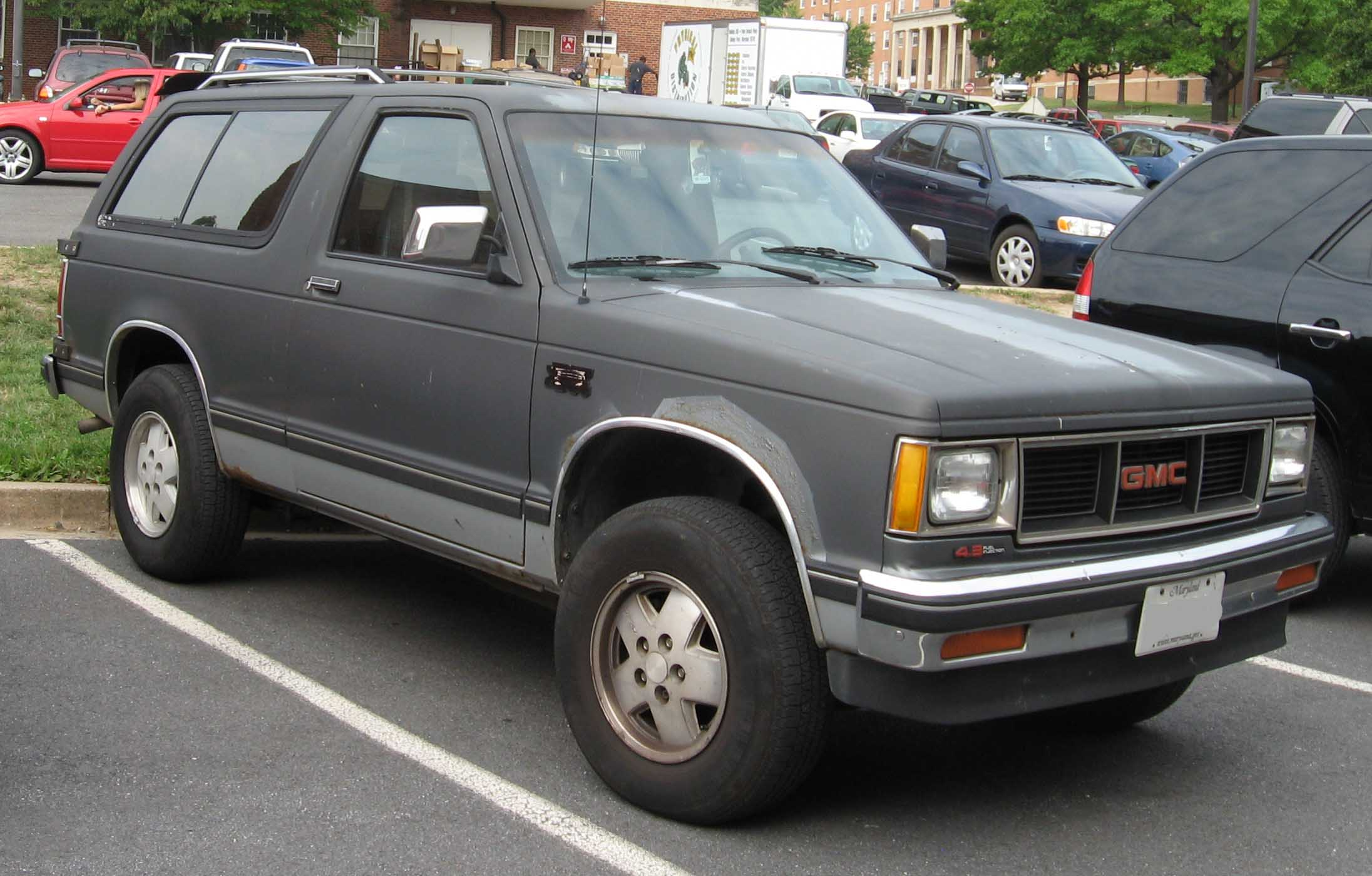
GMC S-15 Jimmy 2-door

In 1982, General Motors introduced the Chevrolet S-10 Blazer, and its rebadged GMC S-15 Jimmy variant, as 1983 models. They were based on, and co-developed, with the 1982 Chevrolet S-10 pickup truck, introduced one year prior, to replace the Isuzu-based Chevrolet LUV truck. Similar to the pickup models, these versions are sometimes internally referred to as the S/T series to denote two- and four-wheel-drive models respectively (similar to the full-size Chevrolet C/K trucks) despite all versions being badged with "S" nomenclature.

Unlike their full-size K5 counterparts, the S-series Blazer and Jimmy did not feature removable hardtops. For their first eight model years, they were only offered in a two-door bodystyle; only in March 1990 were four-door versions of the S-10 Blazer and Jimmy introduced as 1991 models, with a 6.5 in (17 cm) greater wheelbase and length. While significantly smaller in all dimensions than the K5 Blazer, interior space was comparable or larger thanks to better packaging – the luggage area, for instance, was 21.0 cu ft (595 L) rather than the 20.1 cu ft (569 L) of the older, larger model.

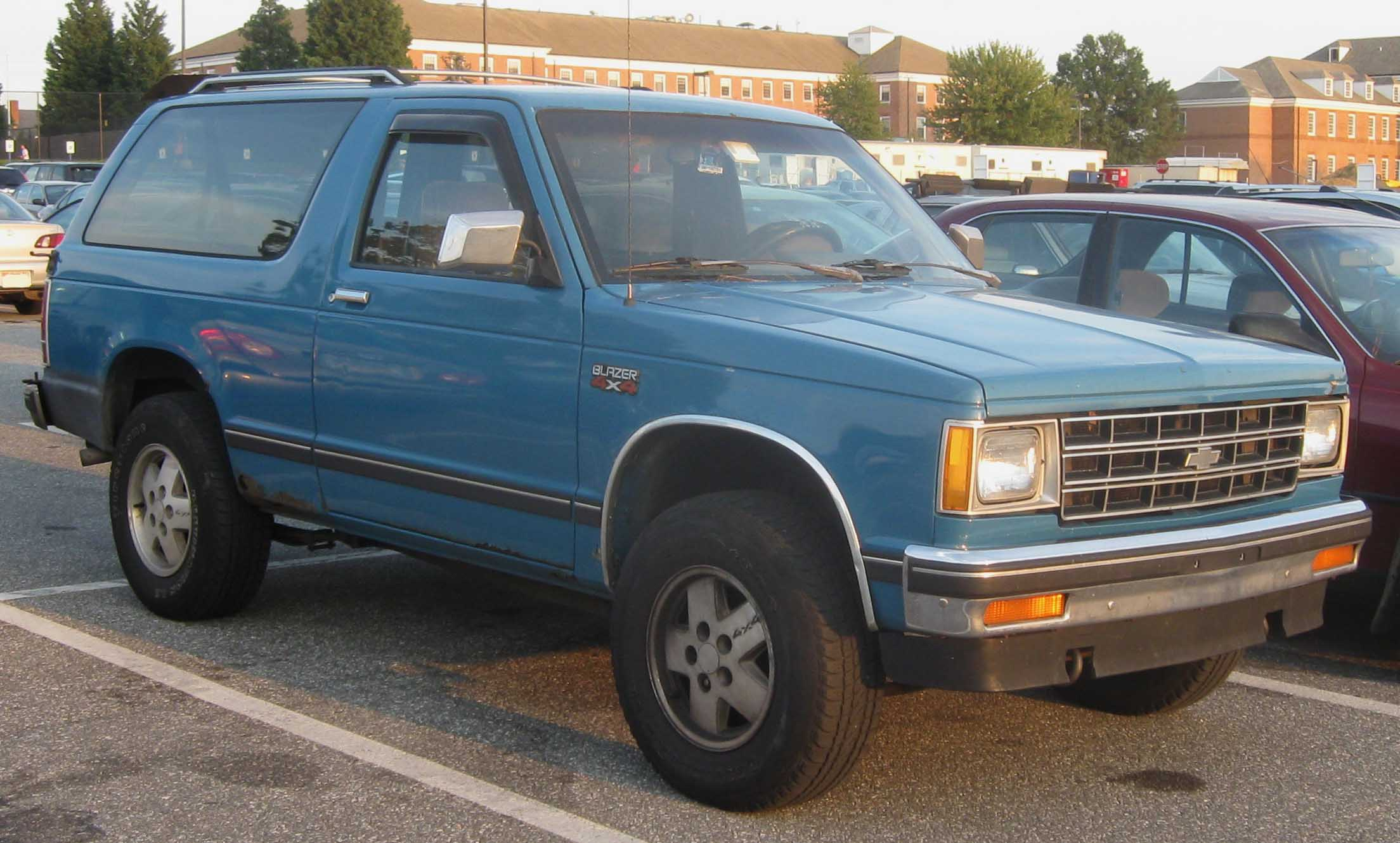
1983–1990 Chevrolet S-10 Blazer 2-door

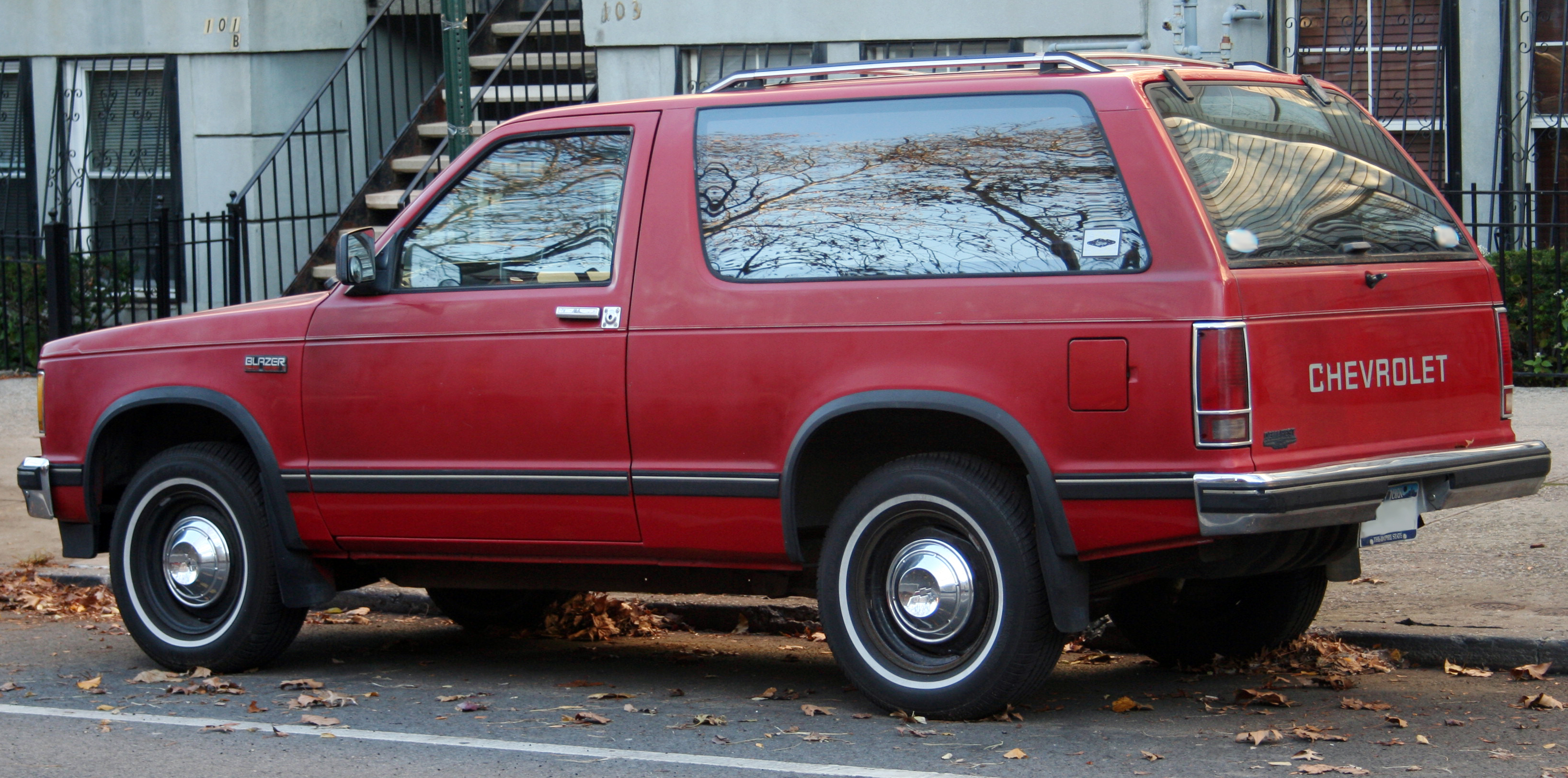
1985 Chevrolet S-10 Blazer 2-door, rear view

Base power was provided by GM's 2.0-liter OHV gasoline inline four-cylinder engine, producing up to 83 horsepower (62 kW). A 2.8-liter 110 hp (82 kW) V6 was offered as an option (coincidentally, this engine was also used in Jeep's competing Cherokee until 1987). Due to emissions laws, a 1.9-liter gasoline inline-four built by Isuzu was offered as the base model engine in California in place of the 2.0-liter engine, while an Isuzu 2.2-liter diesel engine (also used in the S-10/S-15 pickups) producing 58 hp (43 kW) was offered as an option.

The 1.9 L, 2.0 L gasoline, and 2.2 L diesel engines were dropped after 1984, replaced by the larger 2.5 L Iron Duke engine. The V6 was refitted with a throttle-body fuel injection system for 1986 in order to improve performance and fuel economy.

In order for it to keep being competitive, the Blazer and Jimmy received a new 4.3 L (262 cu in) V6 option for 1988 (also used with the S-10/S-15 pickups, Astro/Safari vans, G-series vans, and C/K 1500 and 2500 trucks), based on the Chevrolet small-block V8 engine, producing a respectable 150 hp (112 kW). Power output was increased to 160 hp (119 kW) for 1989, while the four-cylinder engine was dropped. The 2.8 L V6 was discontinued after 1989, making the 4.3 L the sole available engine. A 5-speed manual transmission (Getrag 290/Hydramatic 290/5LM60, sourced from the GMT400) was added to the option list, replacing the BorgWarner T-5.

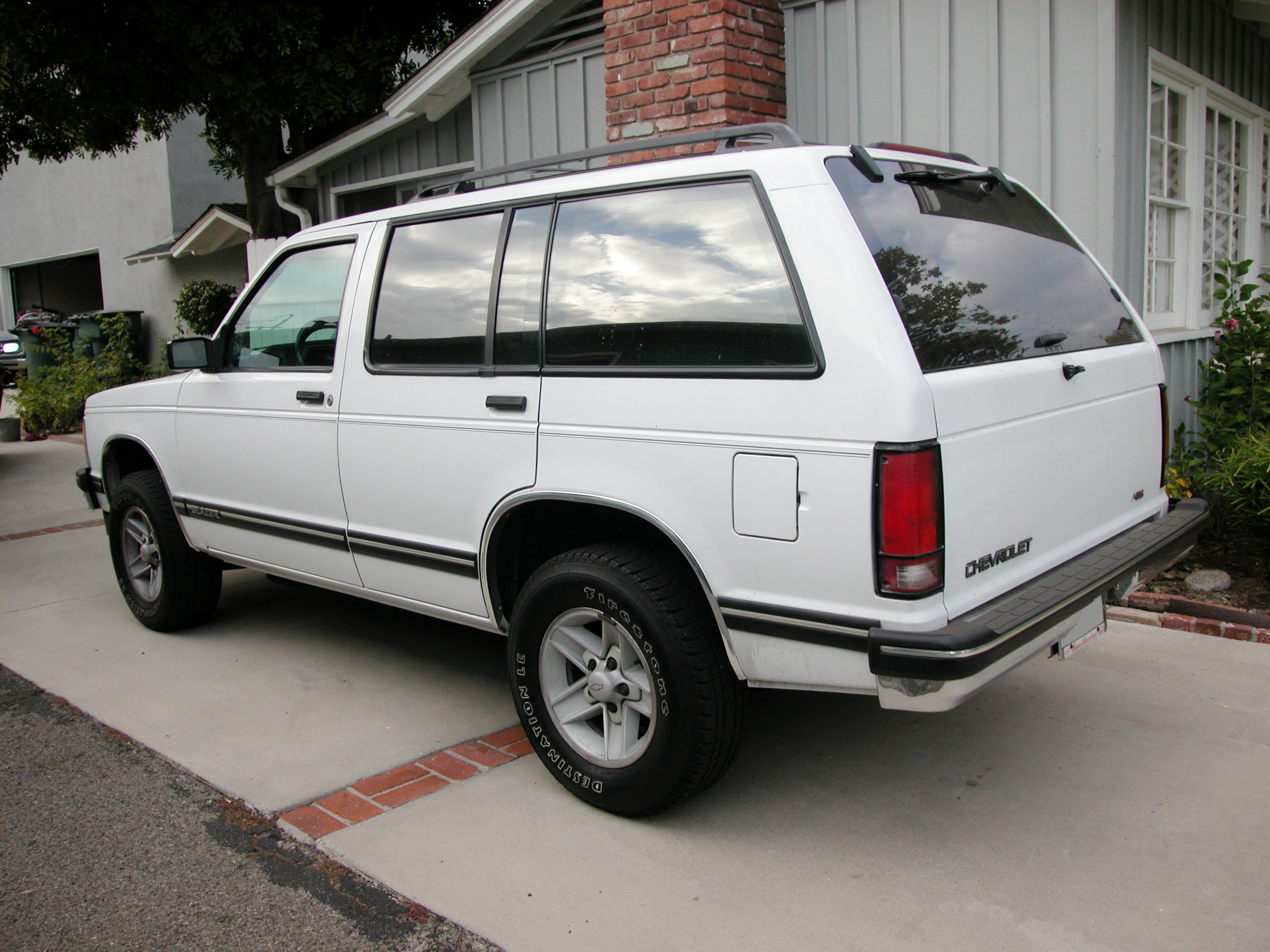
1994 Chevrolet S-Blazer 4-door, rear view

In March 1990, 4-door versions of the S-10 Blazer and Jimmy were introduced as a 1991 model; the 4-door had a 6.5 in longer wheelbase (2-doors had a 100.5 in wheelbase, six inches (152 mm) longer than the Ford Bronco II) and a one-piece front grille with a painted black insert (1990 two-door S-10 Blazers and Jimmys had the three-piece grille). This new grille also did away with the separate metal filler panel under the grille, since the grille is taller and took its place. Early production models between March and August 1990 were initially available as 4WD models only; 2WD versions commenced production thereafter. This came just months ahead of the introduction of the Ford Explorer, which replaced the Bronco II; six-and-a-half years after the segment-leading Cherokee debuted with four doors.

The upscale Oldsmobile Bravada appeared later in the year featuring an All-Wheel-Drive package called "Smart-Trak" (using a BorgWarner 4472 transfer case, shared with the AWD Astro/Safari).

For 1992, the S-10 Blazer and Jimmy received an updated rear back glass (which does not have any trim to which two black buttons serve as the back glass strut mounting points) and front grille (chrome shell with argent silver inserts). The interior was a carryover from 1991 with the exception of the center console and steering wheel (X-bar style similar to the one used in the GMT400 trucks). Also, the "S-15" name was dropped from the Jimmy. The S-10 Blazer also introduced an upscale Tahoe and Sport trim packages, the Tahoe LT, which was rebadged as the LT in 1995 while the Tahoe package was rebadged as the LS. The Tahoe LT had its own exterior décor with faded lower body lines on the lower rockers along with Tahoe LT badges; this also included an overhead console and remote keyless entry. The sport package had bigger sway bars, slightly modified suspension, and 30×9.5" or optional 31×10.5" tires. Body trim included also black plastic fender flares, front fog lights, and spare tire carrier on the tailgate.

1992 was the first model year the S-10 Blazer and Jimmy was available with an NP233 electronic transfer case. This deleted the manual gear range selector with a three-position switch located to the left of the gauge cluster in the place of the rear defrost button found on other models (the defrost button assembly on models with the electronic transfer case is positioned below the headlight switch). The electronic transfer case added luxury; however, there was no neutral position with the electronic transfer case, so the owner's manual stated that the drive shaft had to be removed when the vehicle was being towed. The fuel lines, which were routed on the driver side frame rail to the TBI fuel injectors, were redesigned where the fuel inlets entered the rear of the engine (same as the GMT400). This was phased in because of the L35 option which used a similar fuel line setup. The serpentine accessory drive for the 4.3 L engine was modified where the air pump was eliminated and further lightened.

From at least 1991 onward, all S-10 Blazers and Jimmies came with four-wheel anti-lock brakes as standard equipment. The first two years of the ABS system had axleshafts with pressed-on ABS toner rings, which were eliminated during the latter half of the 1993 model year (rear ABS control was now done via the vehicle speed sensor). A five-speed manual transmission remained standard through 1994, but only with the TBI engine. Only the two 4.3 L (262 cu in) engines were offered as options, the base TBI and the CPI (introduced in 1992 for the S-10/S-15 and Astro/Safari vans; the latter had the "Vortec" logo on the intake plenum).

1993 had a few changes; the S-10 Blazer was renamed "S-Blazer" while the full-size Blazer became just "Blazer." The center console was raised (with a dual cup holder), and the 4L60-E transmission replaced the 700R4. The grille (alongside the S-10 pickup) was revised (which was a chrome-plated version of the base work truck grille found on base S-10 pickups), along with the addition of optional five-spoke alloy rims on 2WD models (which were basically a copy of the third-generation Camaro Z28 15" alloy rims).

Although the second generation S-10/S-15 pickup debuted in 1994, the S-Blazer and Jimmy continued unchanged for that year, with the only significant changes being a third brake light and the discontinuation of the rear spoiler. 1994 was a transition year for many automakers when it came to switching from R-12 Freon to CFC-free R134a refrigerant. The redesigned 1994 S-10 and Sonoma pickups used R134a refrigerant. Despite being nearly identical to the 1993 models, the entire 1994 model year full-size pickup and SUV lineup (C/K, Sierra, Suburban, Yukon) also used R134a. The 1994 S-Blazer and Jimmy seem to have used R-12 until the end of their production run.

== Second generation (1995–2005) ==
Second generation
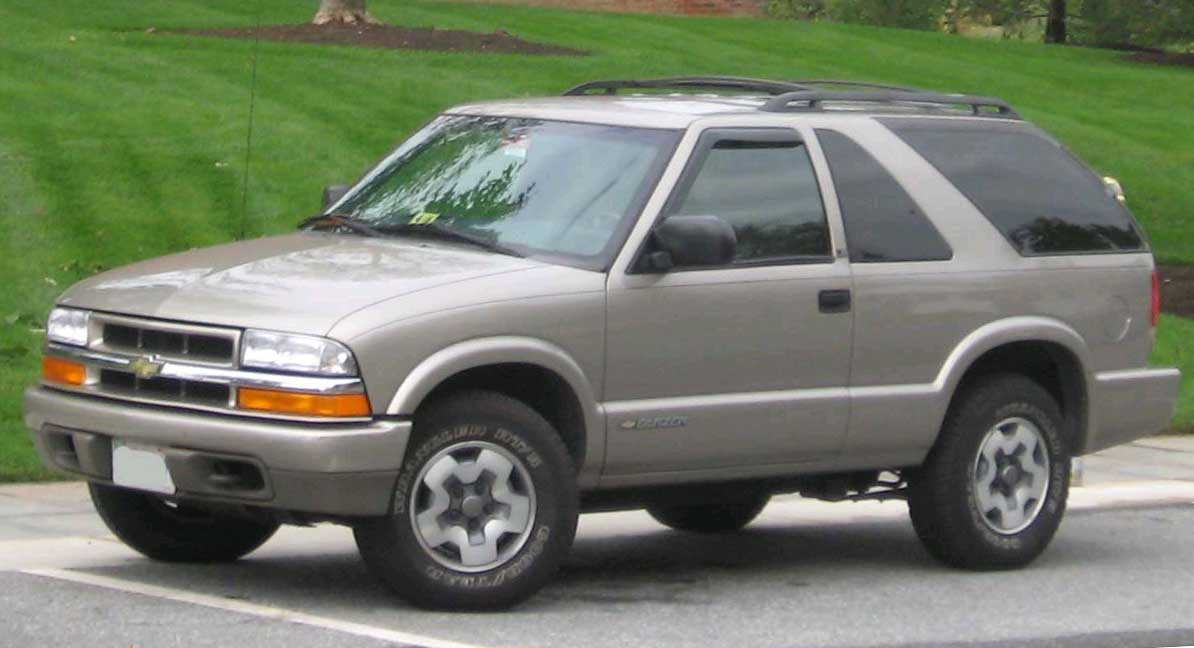
- 1998–2005 Chevrolet Blazer

Overview
- Also called: Chevrolet TrailBlazer (1999–2001); GMC Jimmy; GMC Envoy; Opel Blazer (Indonesia, 1995–2002)
- Production: 1994–2005 (North America); 1997–2012 (Brazil); 2000–2004 (China); 1995–2005 (Indonesia); 1996–1998 (Russia)
- Model years: 1995–2005
- Assembly: United States: Linden, New Jersey (Linden Assembly); Moraine, Ohio (Moraine Assembly); Brazil: São José dos Campos (GM Brazil); Venezuela: Valencia (GM Venezuela); China: Shenyang (Jinbei GM); Indonesia: Bekasi (GMBI); Russia: Elabuga (Elaz-GM)

Body and chassis
- Body style: 2-door SUV; 4-door SUV
- Platform: GM GMT330 platform
- Related: Chevrolet TrailBlazer; GMC Jimmy; GMC Envoy; Oldsmobile Bravada; Chevrolet S-10; GMC Sonoma; Isuzu Hombre

Powertrain
- Engine: 4.3 L (262 cu in) Vortec 4300 V6; 2.2 L (134 cu in) GM Family II I4
- Transmission: 4-speed 4L60-E automatic 5-speed T-5 manual

Dimensions
- Wheelbase: 2-door: 100.5 in (2,553 mm); 4-door: 107 in (2,718 mm)
- Length: 2-door: 174.7–177.3 in (4,437–4,503 mm); 4-door: 181.2–188.8 in (4,602–4,796 mm)
- Width: 67.8 in (1,722 mm)
- Height: 64.2–67.0 in (1,631–1,702 mm)

The all-new Blazer was introduced in 1994 as a 1995 model year. This time, it lost the S prefix for simpler identification, as the full-size Blazer was discontinued and renamed the Tahoe. (The Tahoe package, which was a trim for past S-10s, was redesignated as the LS.) Exterior and interior size were increased, bumping it up to a mid-sized SUV. The Blazer was Playboy Magazine's Truck of the Year for 1995 and was also the unanimous winner of the Motor Trend 1995 Truck of the Year. The 1995 Blazer was also awarded North American Truck of the Year at the North American International Auto Show in Detroit.

The second-generation Blazer was available with the 4.3 L V6 engine only, and most models featured four-wheel drive via an electronic transfer case; 1997 was the last year a manual transfer case (with floor-shifter) for four-wheel drive was offered. A driver-side airbag came, but a passenger-side airbag was not immediately introduced.

In 1998, the interior and exterior received some cosmetic changes. The makeover offered a new dashboard with larger buttons and more ergonomically correct driving controls, as well as larger door handles, and headrests for the rear bench. A passenger airbag is now standard. A front grille similar to the Chevrolet C/K pickup line's stacked-headlight system replaced the older single-headlight system, similar to the full-size GMT400 trucks. Four-wheel disc brakes became standard equipment, fitted with aluminum dual-piston calipers: the front disc brakes were redesigned with the dual-piston calipers and 11" diameter brake rotors (steering knuckles now have sealed hub assemblies), while the truck models continued to use single-piston disc brakes. The folding mirrors received a refresh for 1999, while 2000 saw new front bumpers and the trim running along the sides and bumpers was removed. For the 2001 model year, the truck received a new center console.

Another upscale model was the 1998 GMC Envoy. It used the same engines and had many of the same upgrades as the Bravada. The 1998 model Envoy featured an optional upgrade to High Intensity Discharge headlamps, and several other visual modifications. To celebrate the 30th anniversary of the Jimmy nameplate, the Jimmy Diamond Edition was launched. Not too different from the Envoy, it featured leather seats with a diamond pattern, special diamond logos, and an aluminum silver plate along lower sides of the SUV.

In 1999, Chevrolet introduced a limited edition TrailBlazer appearance package that was available as an upgrade to the LS and LT trims. The package featured gold-accented alloy rims and trim along with several interior/exterior modifications and upgrades and was marketed until the introduction of the GMT360 series for the 2002 model year. The TrailBlazer's headlamps, which featured daytime running lamps, would be available on various Blazer models until production ended. Upon introduction of the 2002 Chevrolet TrailBlazer and the GMC Envoy, production continued after their successors came to the market, with the Jimmy being sold only in Canada and, in the 2005 model year, 4-door models sold to vehicle fleets.

At the same time, a Blazer Xtreme (only on the 2-door model) was added to the lineup, based on the S-10 Xtreme. This sub-model lasted until 2004.

The second-generation Blazer was officially sold in Taiwan, between 1995 and 1996.

The ZR2 Package

The ZR2 package was only offered on the 2-door Blazer as the 2 door had the shorter wheelbase. It had a wider ladder-type frame which made its track approximately 3.9 inches wider. It also lifted the Blazer about three inches higher, allowing it to clear 31×10.5" tires on 15-inch wheels. Enhanced front (7.25" ring gear) and rear (8.5" ring gear) axles with a 3.73:1 rear-axle ratio, larger wheels and axle bearings, a stronger front anti-sway bar, skid plates, and Bilstein shocks were also added. This package cost a little over $1,000 and was first introduced on the S-10 pickup in 1994 and carried over to the Blazer in 1996.

In Canada, a ZR2 version of the GMC Jimmy was also offered.

The U.S. Insurance Institute for Highway Safety gave a P for poor in the frontal offset crash test.

Right-hand-drive model

The right-hand-drive Blazer has been assembled in Indonesia since 1995. In 1998, General Motors launched the right-hand drive version to be built in the United States for the export to the countries with left-hand rule of road. The S-10 Blazer destined for the Japanese market had some modifications to suit the Japanese people: turn-signal stalk moving closer to the steering wheel, external rear-view mirrors electrically folding in to fit through the narrow streets, brake pedal changing its angle for easier reach, larger wheel arches, and a few miscellaneous changes.

The right-hand-drive dashboard was also used for Holden Suburban with the passenger (left) side stretched to fit the wider Suburban.

=== Trims and models ===
Blazer	Jimmy	Bravada
Base	SLS Base	Base
LS	SLS Convenience	GL
LT	SLE	GLS
TrailBlazer	SLT	GLX
Xtreme	Diamond Edition	
ZR2 Off-road Trim	Envoy	
	ZR2 Off-road Trim (Canada only)	

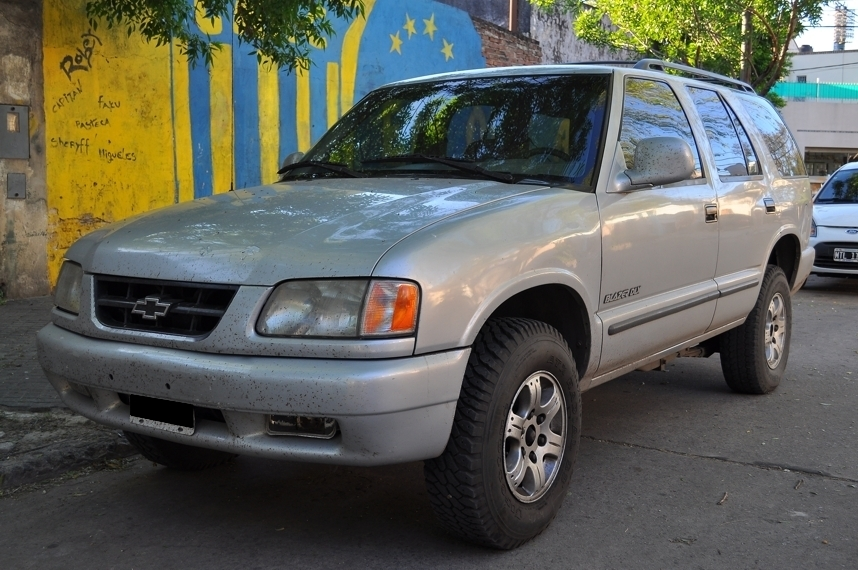
Blazer/S10 Brazilian/Middle Eastern version

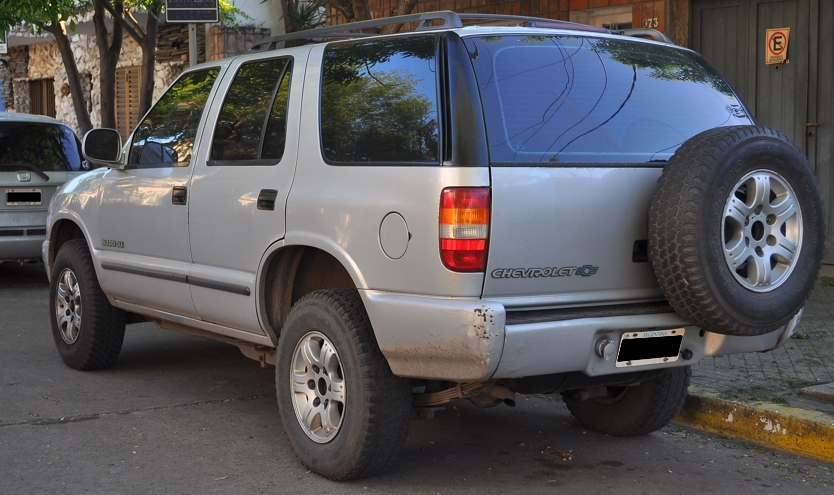
Blazer/S10 Brazilian version with external spare tire bracket

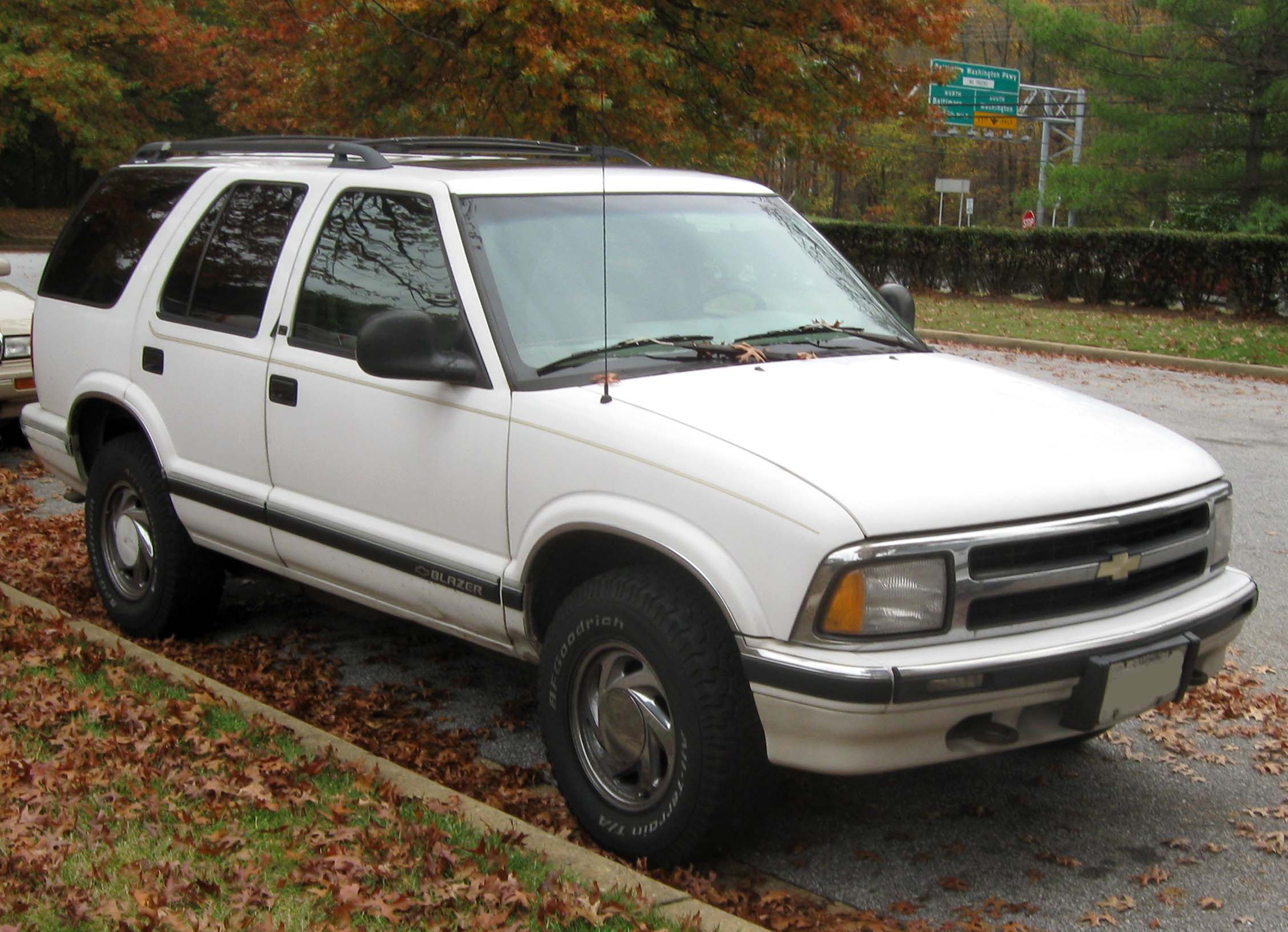
1995–1997 Chevrolet S-10 Blazer 4-door

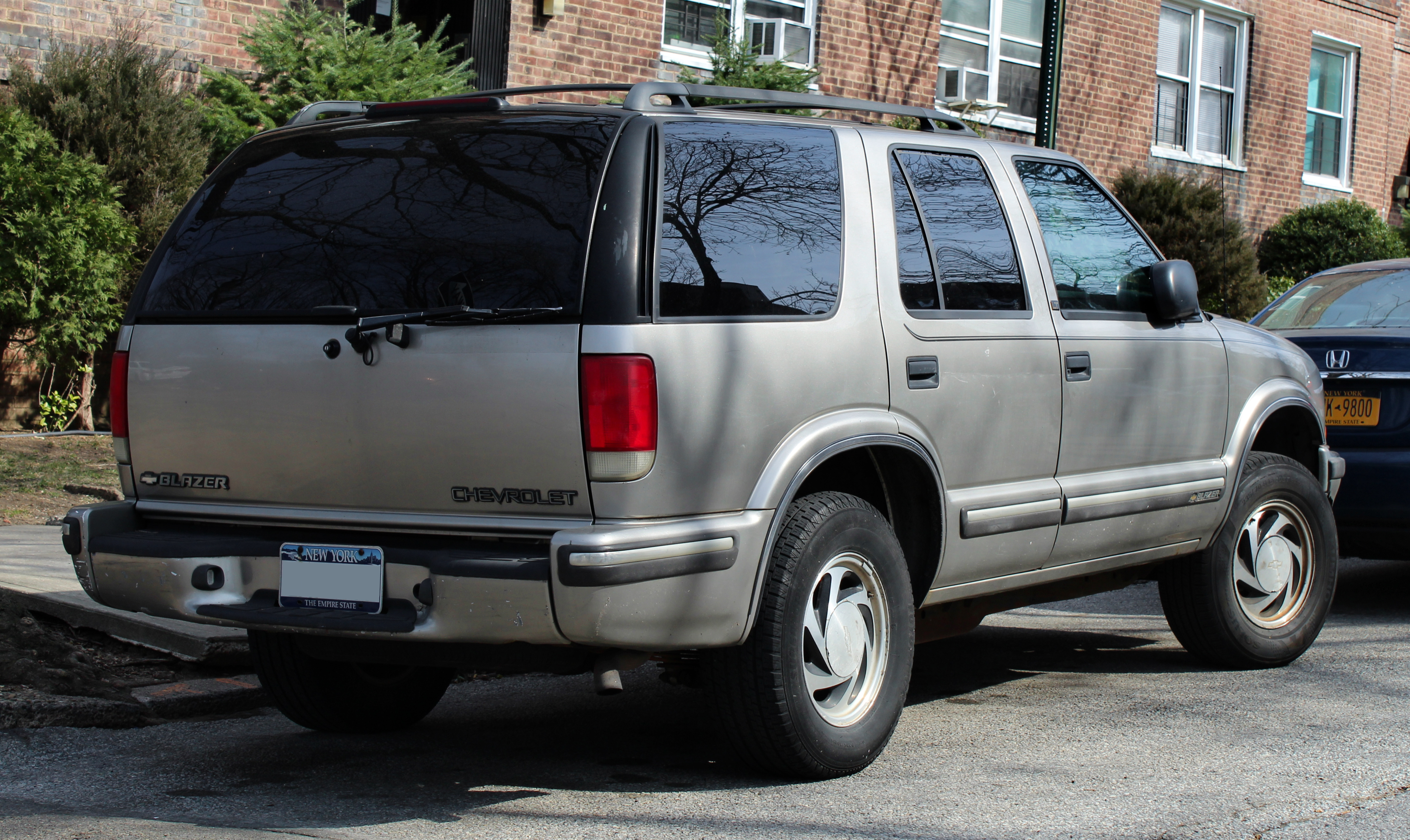
1998 Chevrolet S-10 Blazer

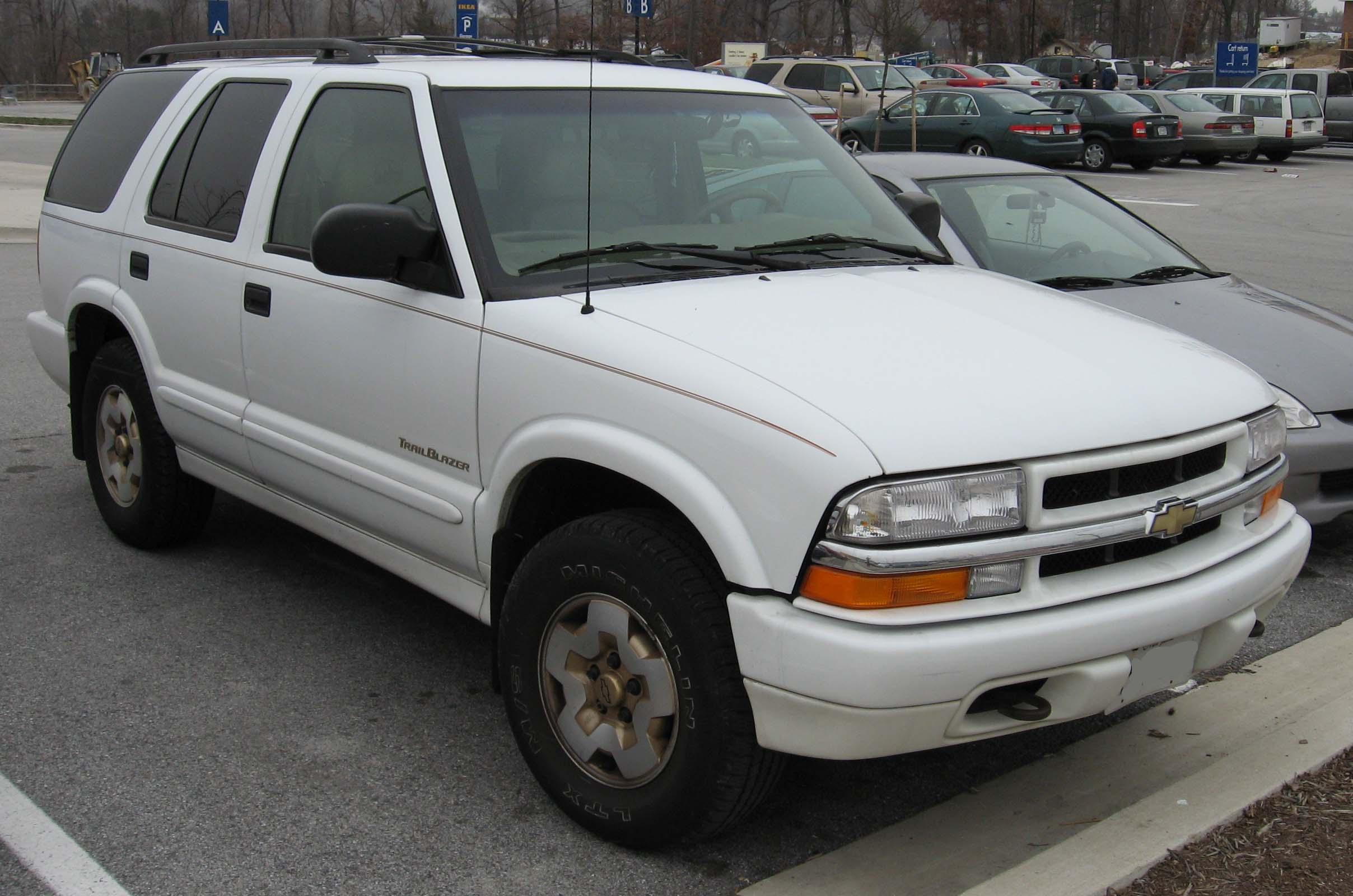
1999–2001 Chevrolet S-10 Blazer with TrailBlazer appearance package

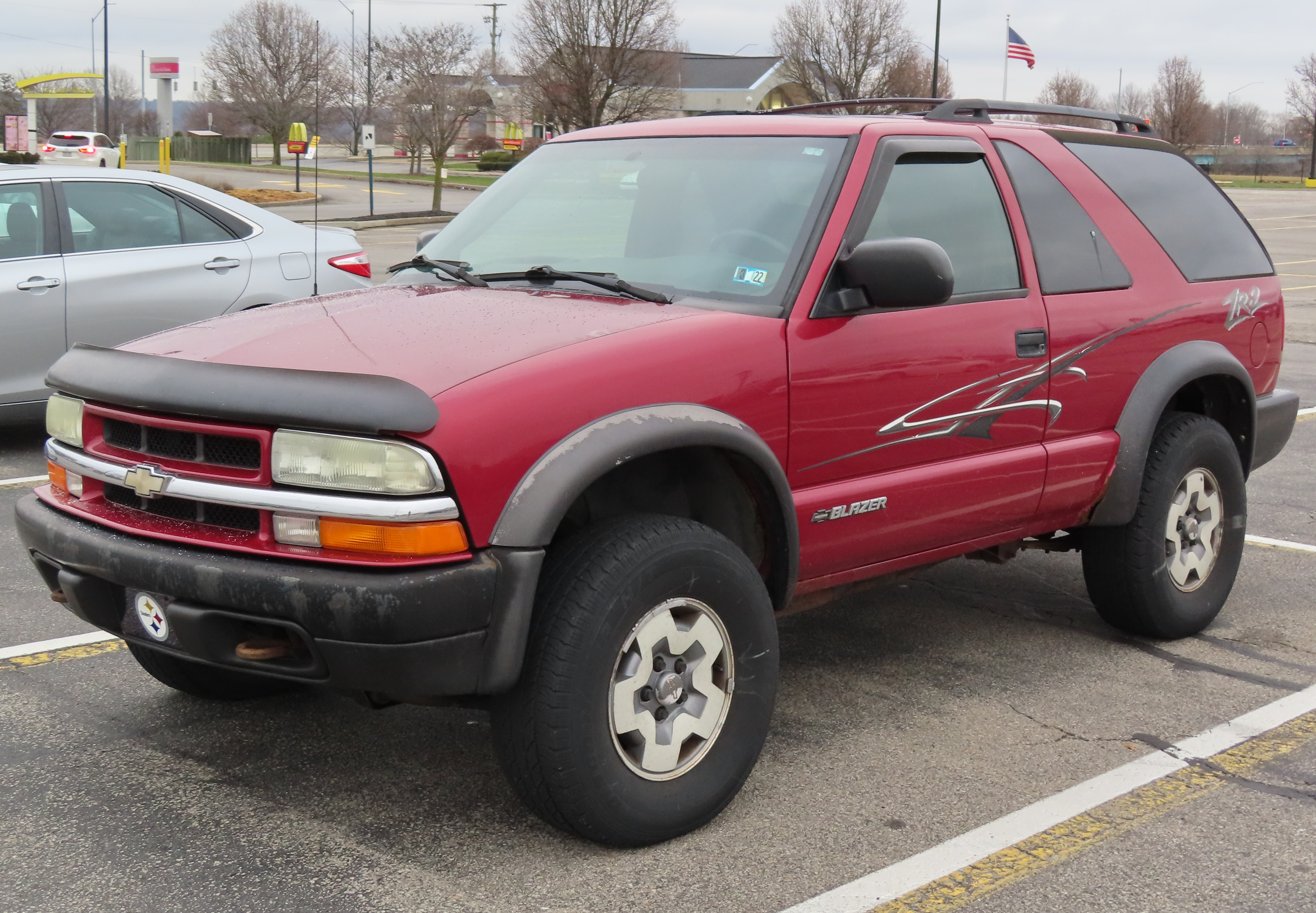
2004–2005 Chevrolet Blazer ZR2

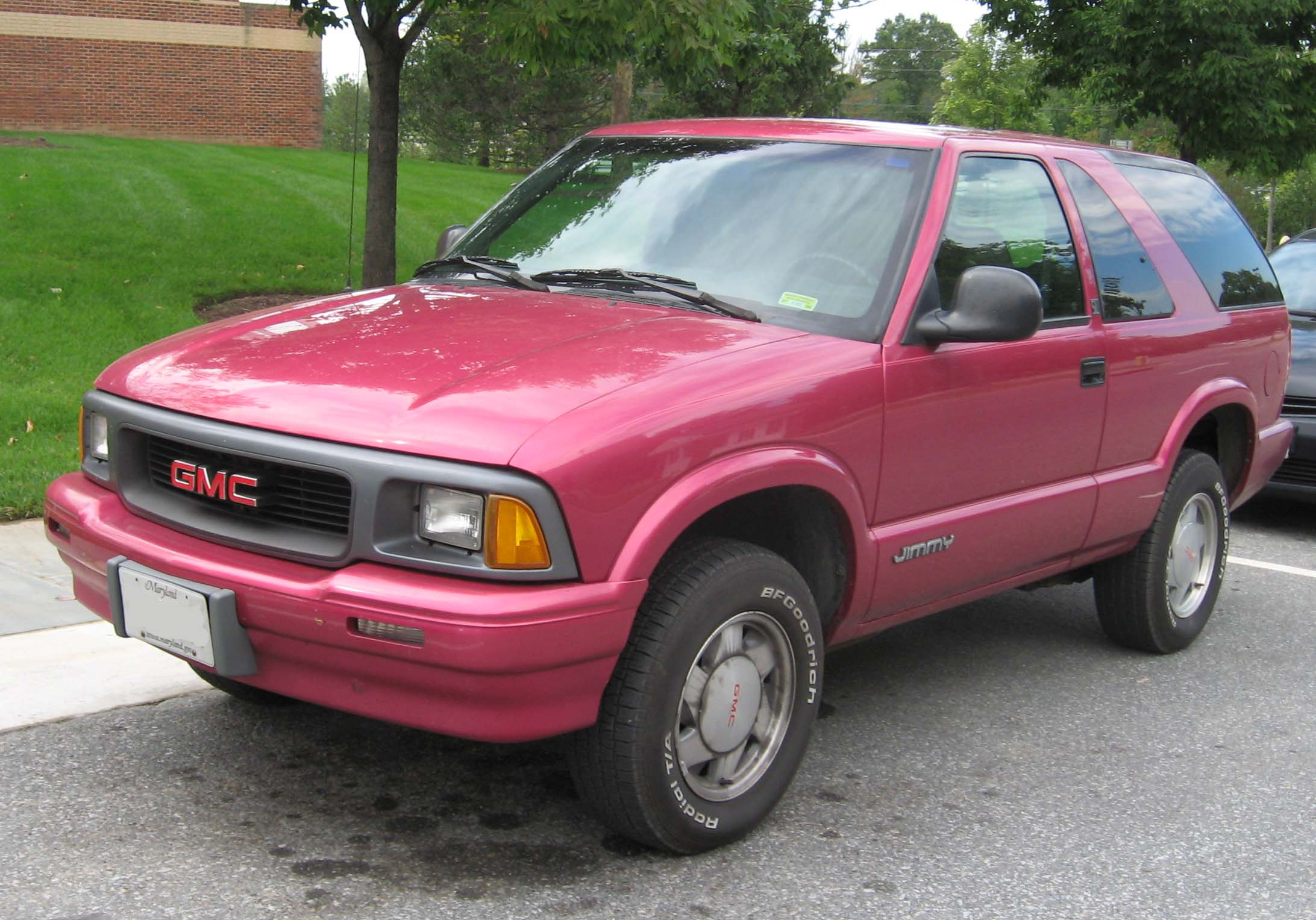
1995–1997 GMC S-15 Jimmy 2-door

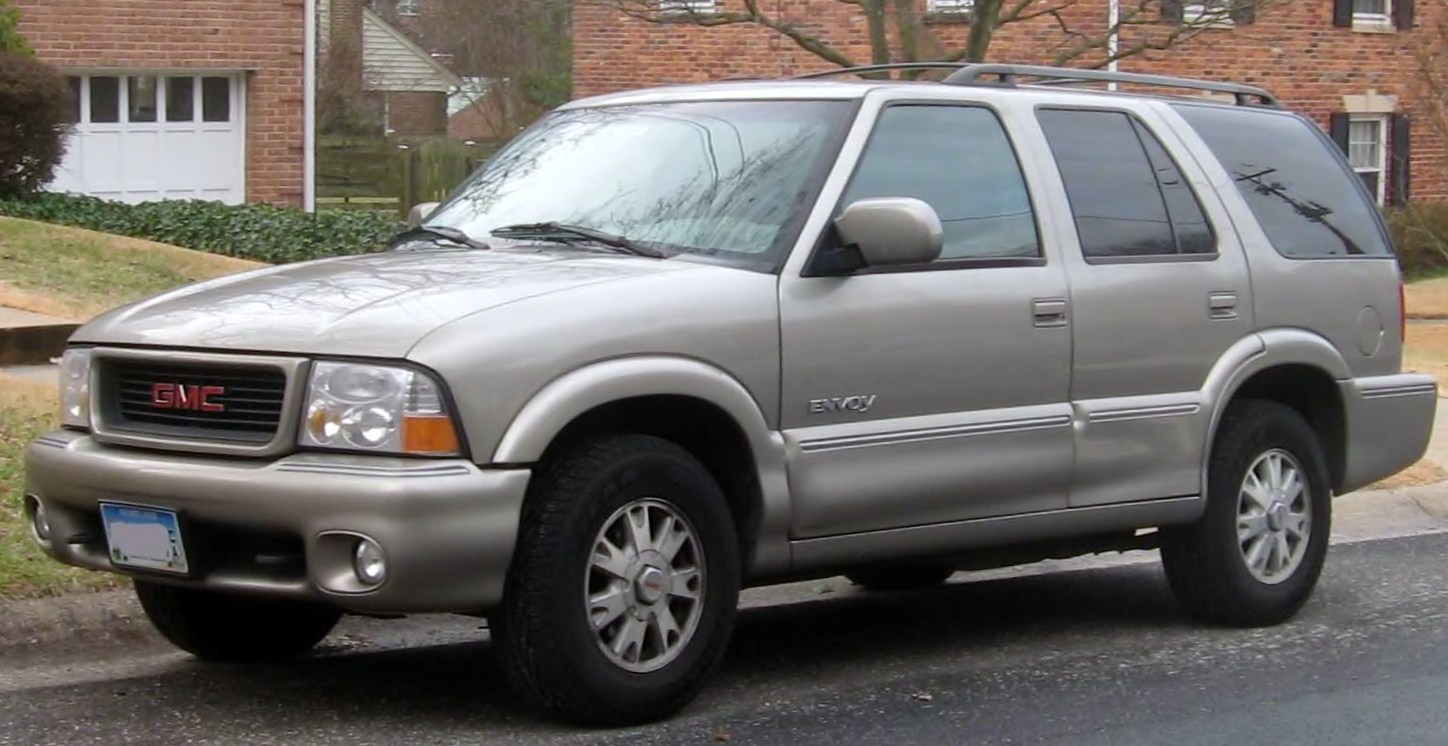
1998–2000 GMC Jimmy with Envoy appearance package

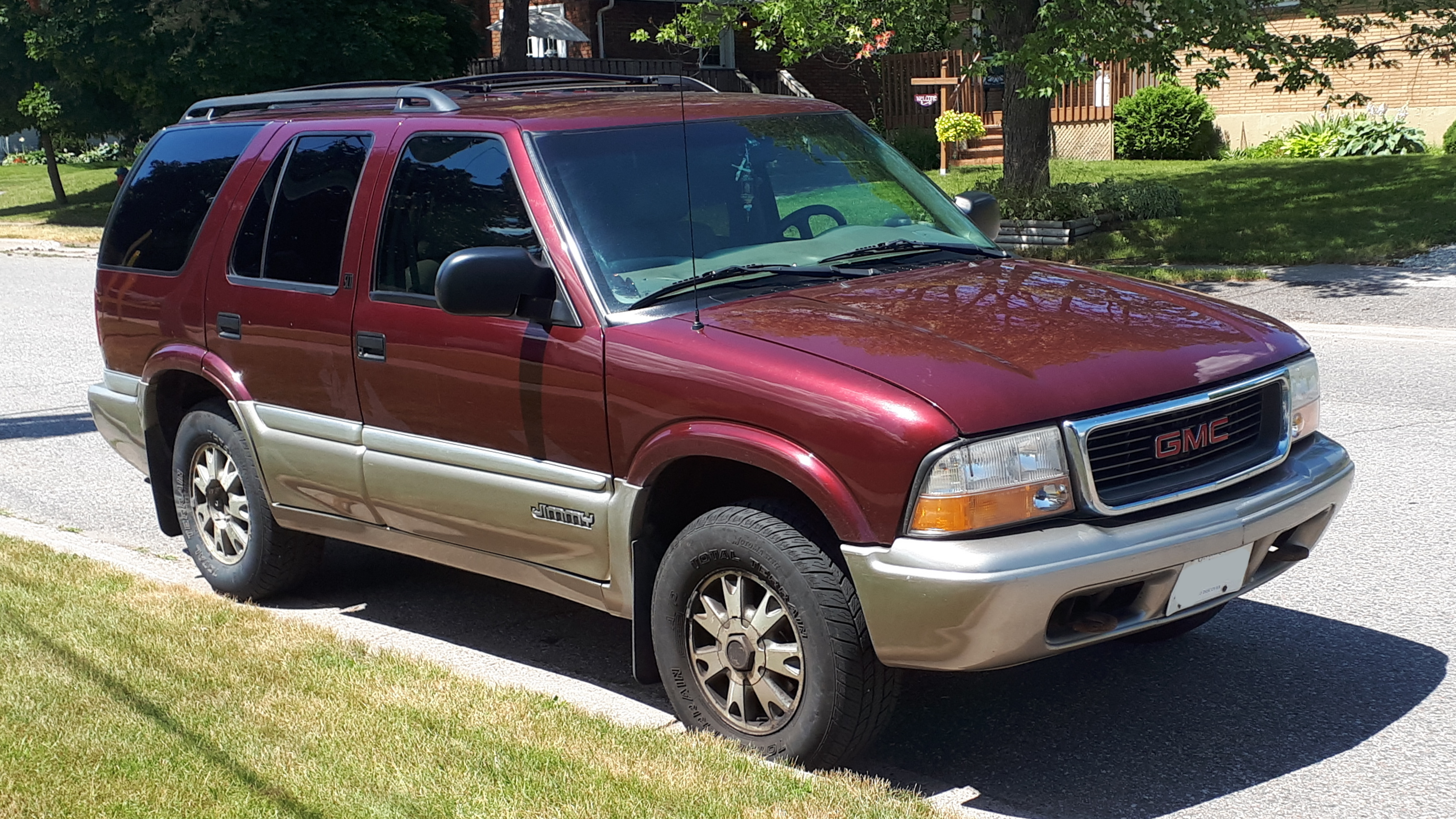
Facelifted 1998–2005 GMC Jimmy

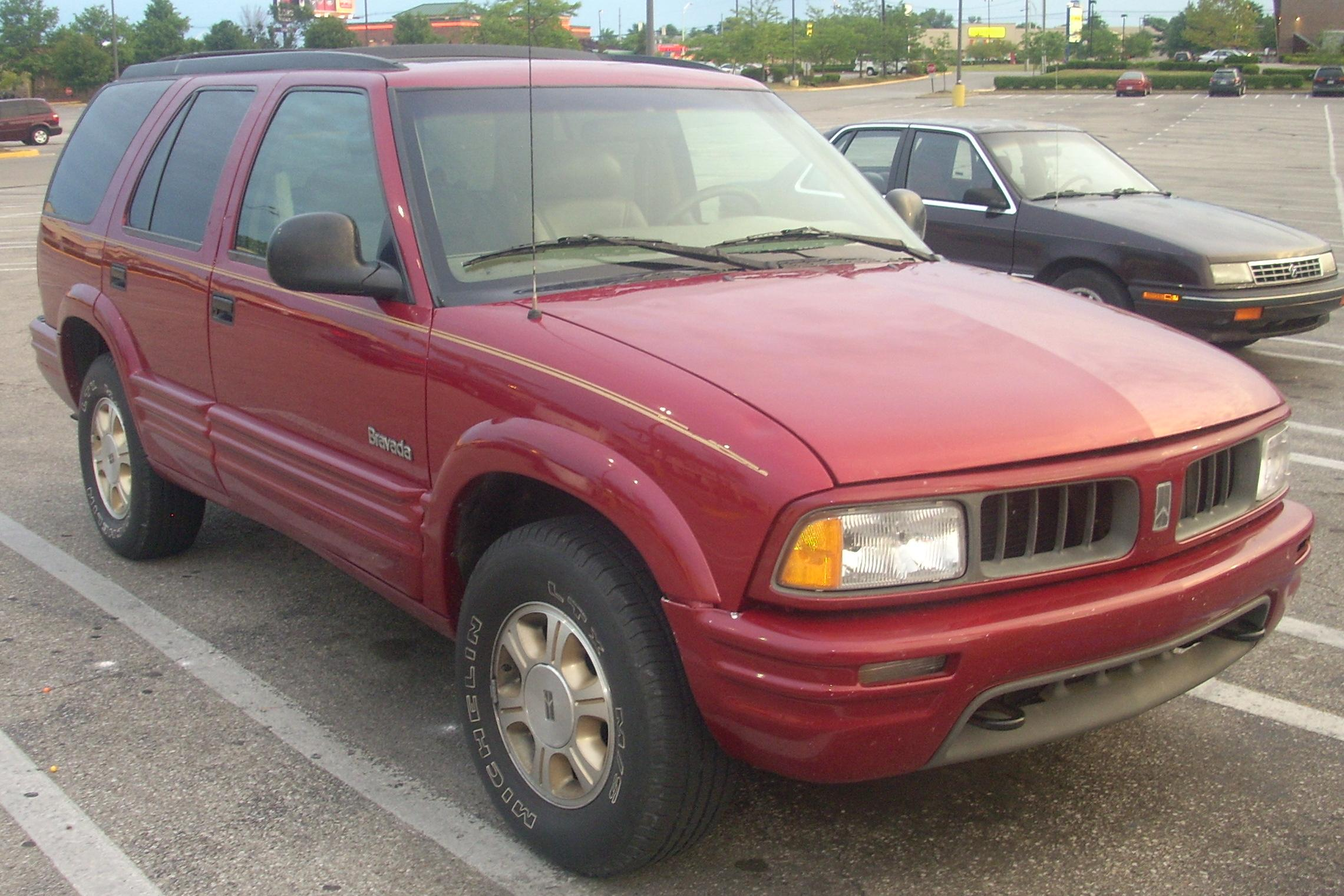
1995-1997 Oldsmobile Bravada

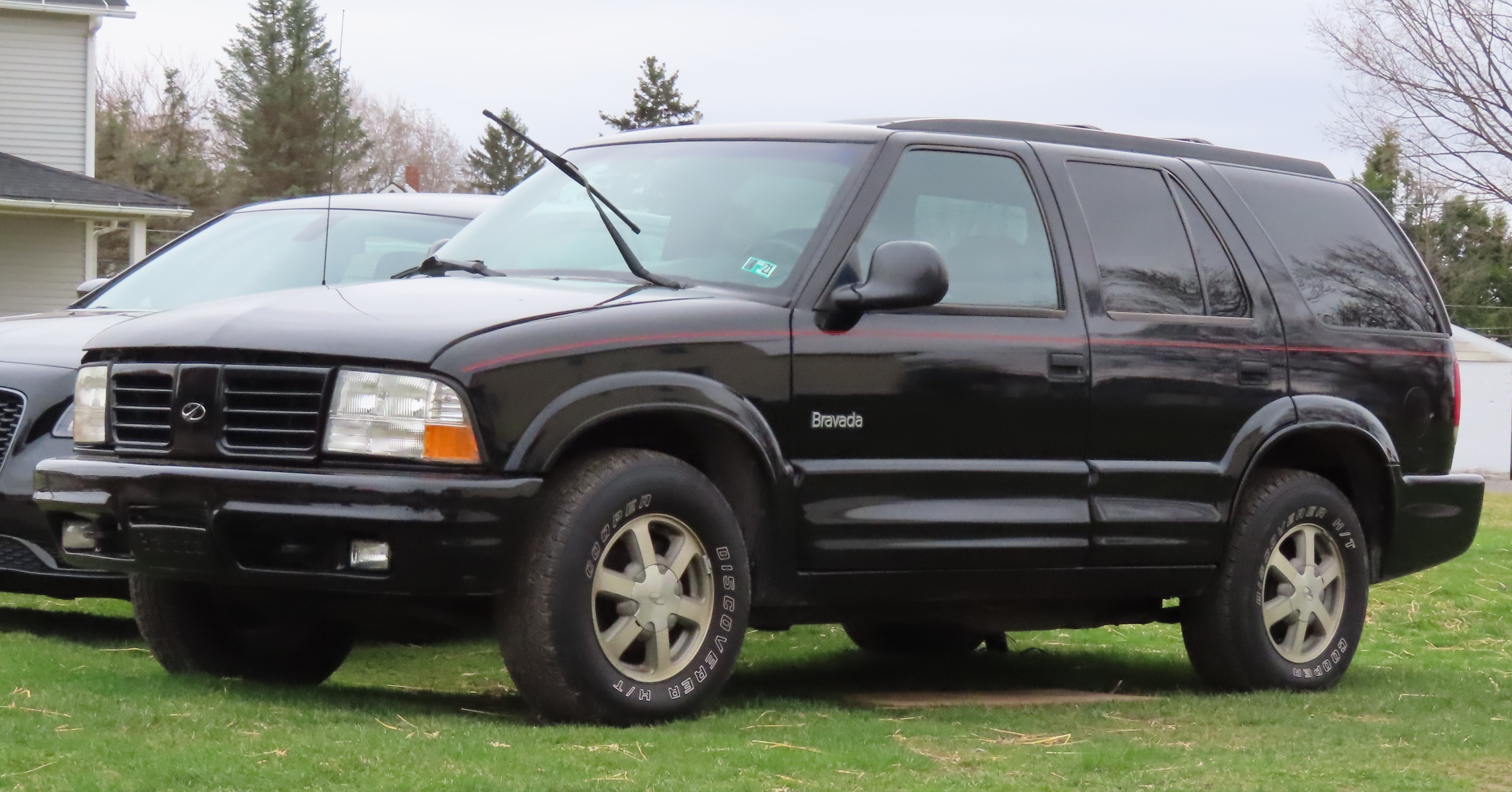
1998–2001 Oldsmobile Bravada

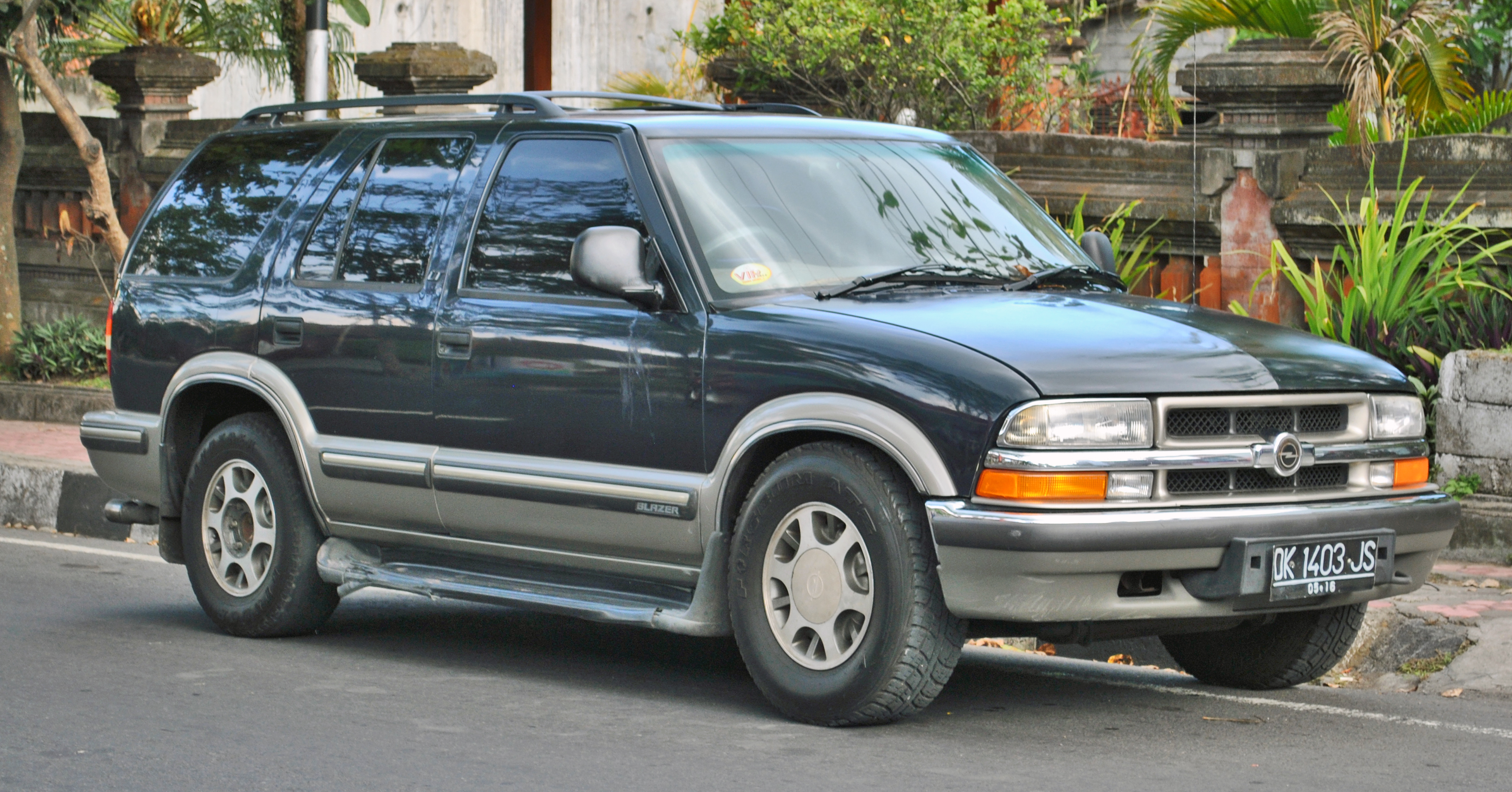
1999-2002 Indonesian-built Opel Blazer

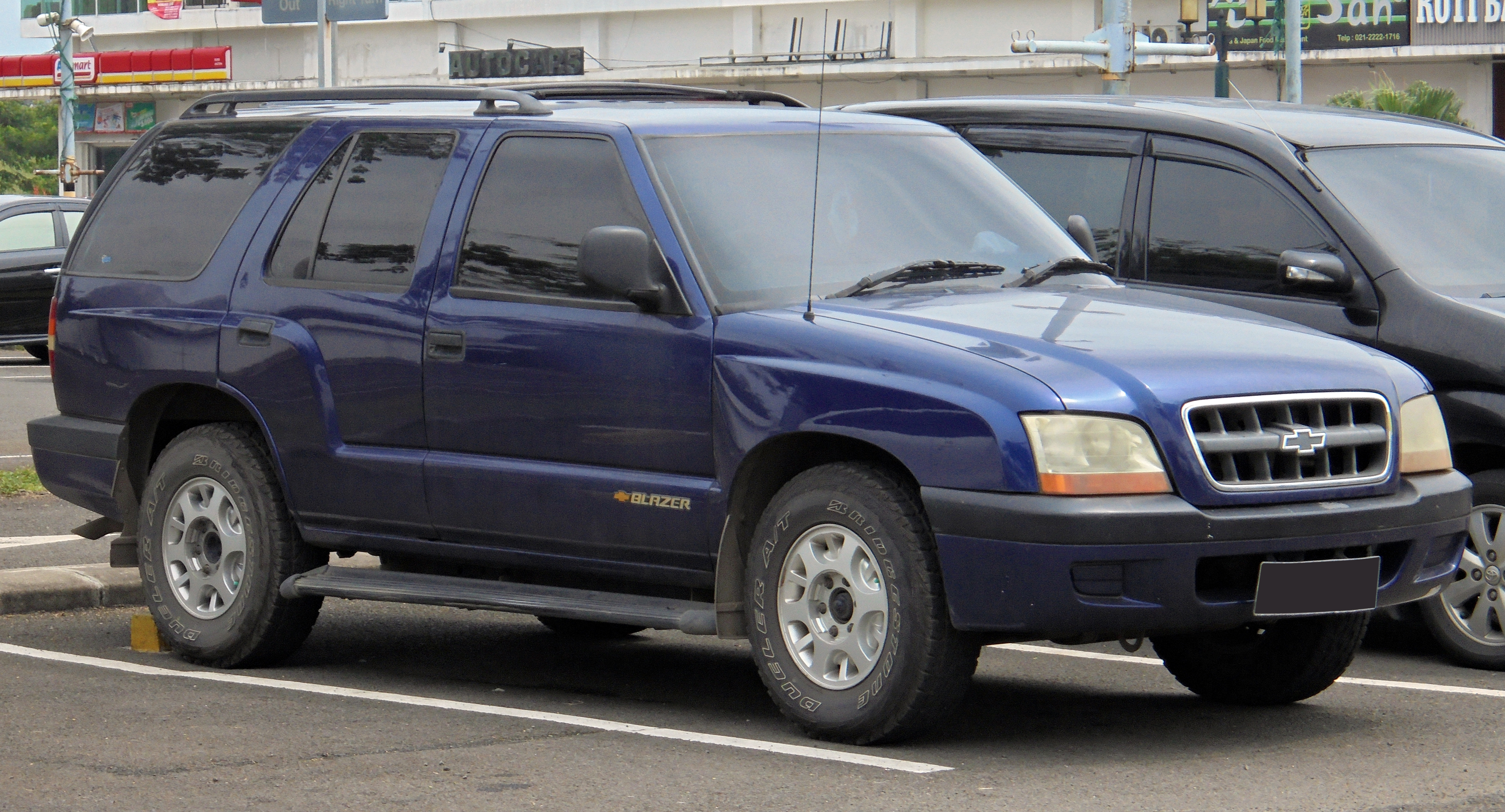
2002-2005 Indonesian-built Chevrolet Blazer

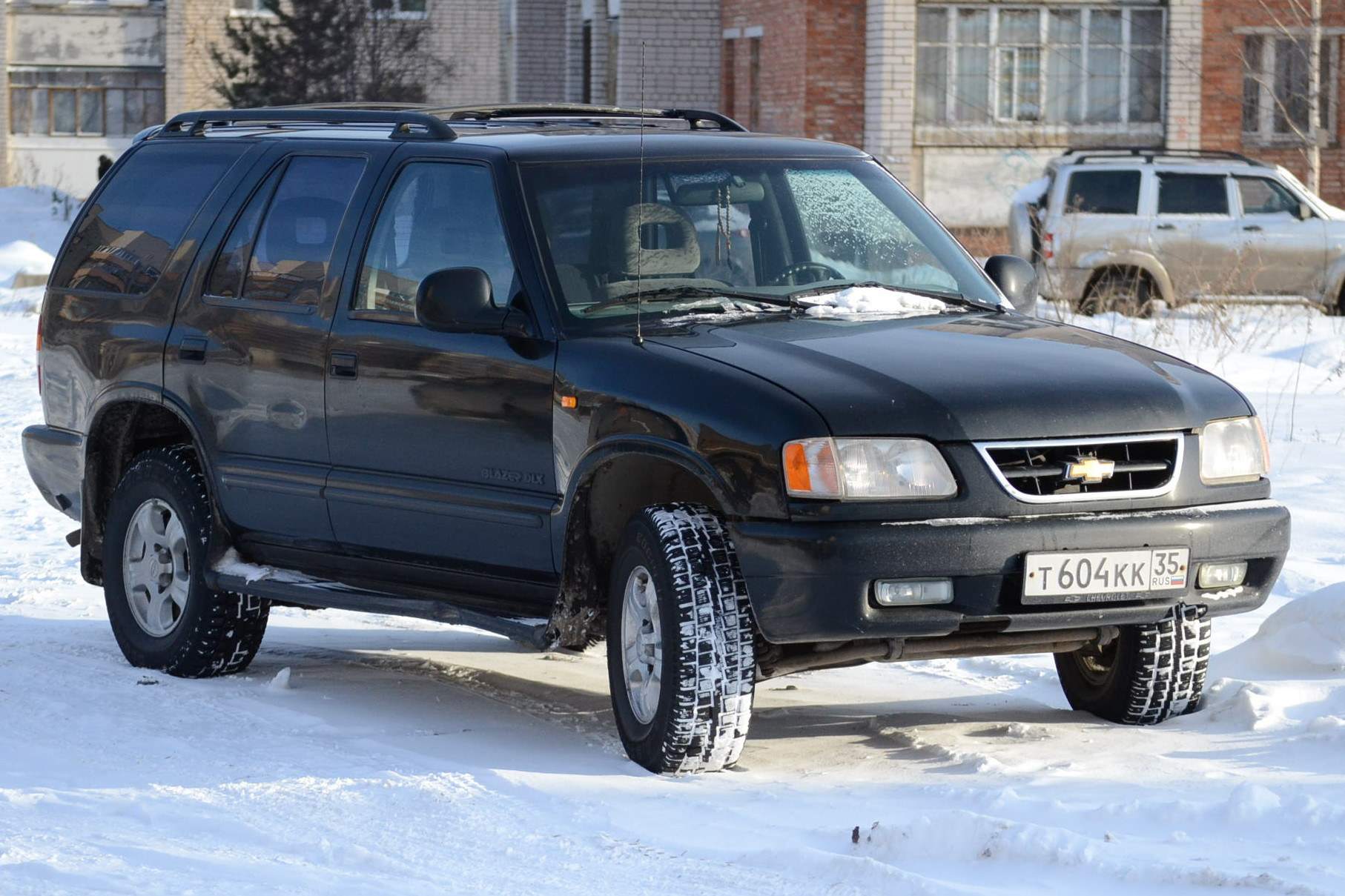
Russian-built Chevrolet Blazer

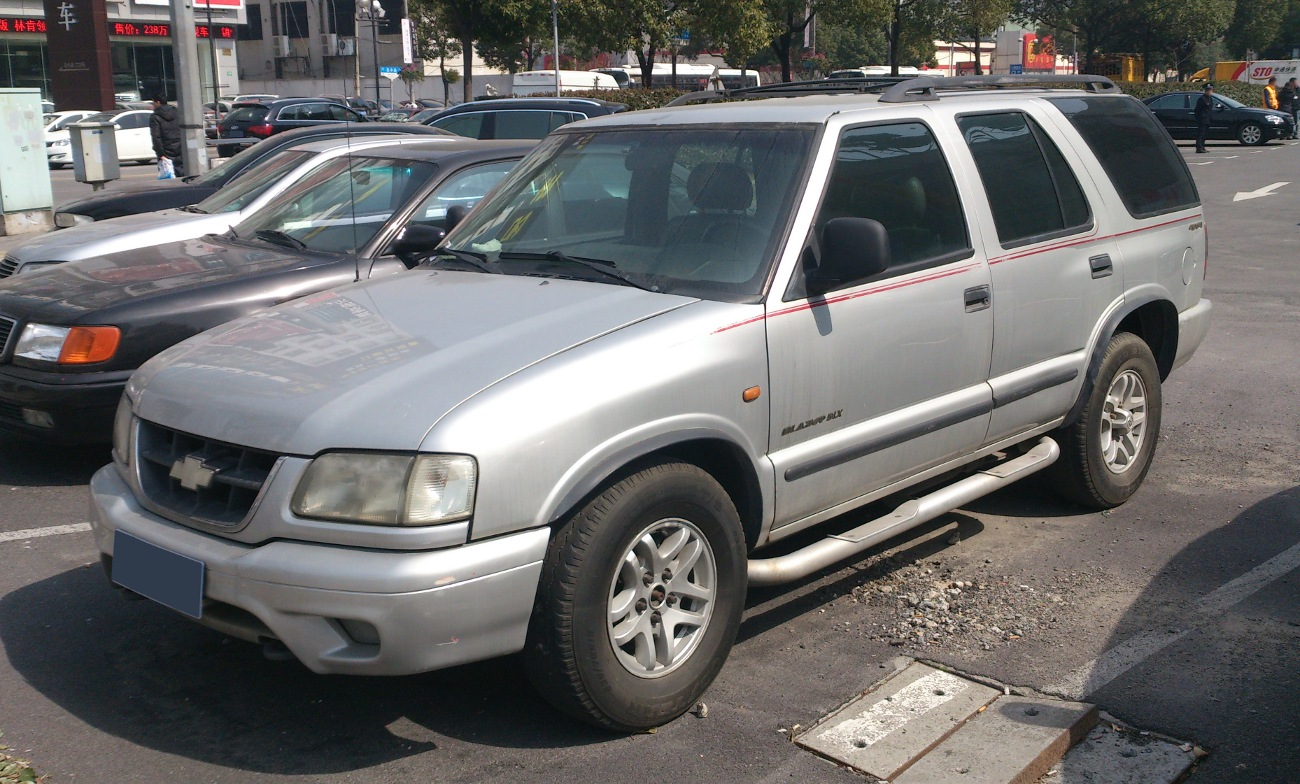
Chinese-built version

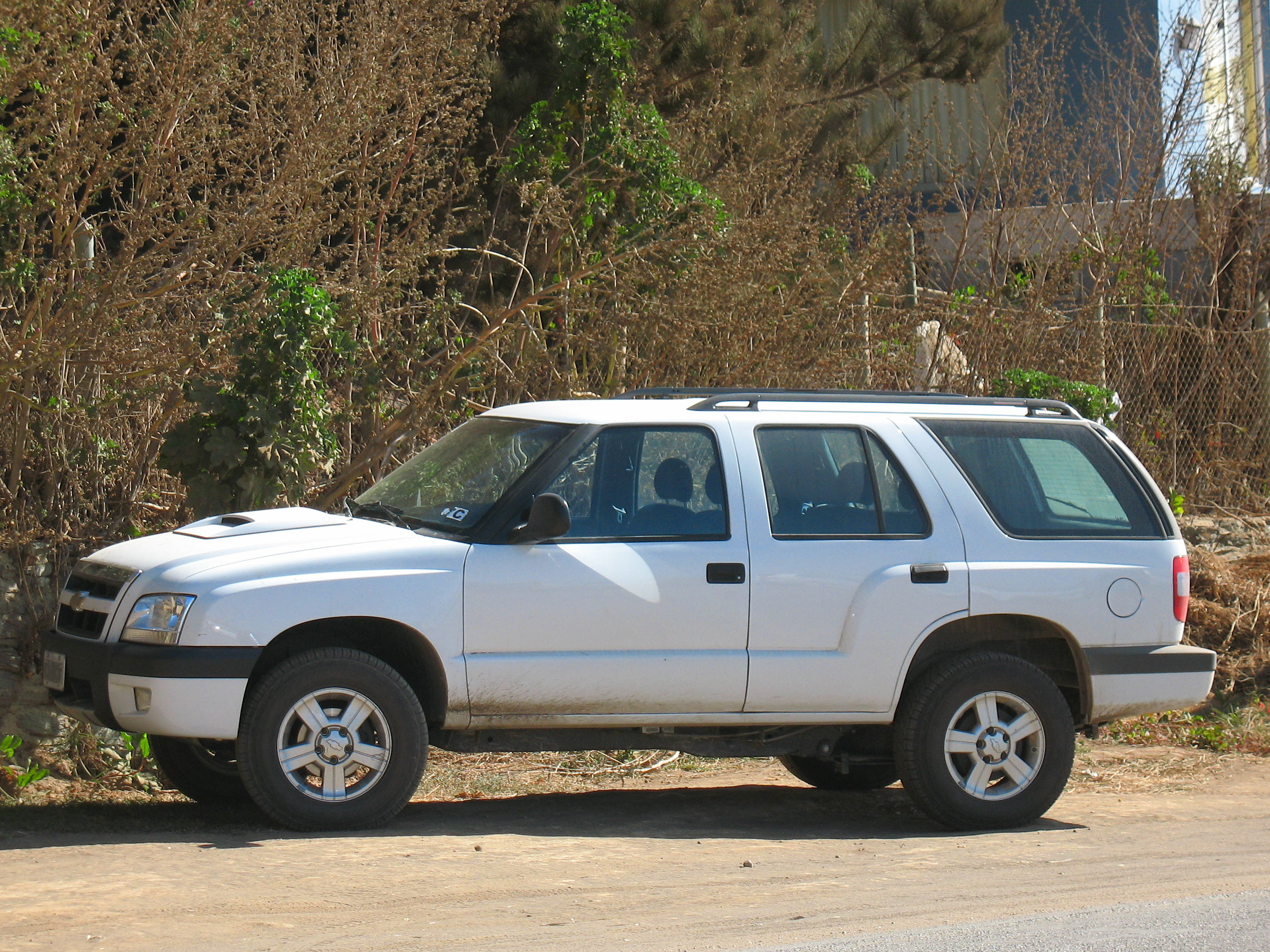
Brazilian-built version (facelift)

=== Second generation engines ===
- 1995: 4.3 L (262 cu in) Vortec 4300 L35 V6, CPFI, 200 hp (149 kW)/260 lb⋅ft (353 N⋅m) (VIN W)
- 1996–2002: 4.3 L (262 cu in) Vortec 4300 L35 V6, CSFI, 190 hp (142 kW)/250 lb⋅ft (339 N⋅m) (VIN W)
- 2002–2005: 4.3 L (262 cu in) Vortec 4300 LU3 V6, MPFI, 190 hp (142 kW)/250 lb⋅ft (339 N⋅m) (VIN X)
- (Middle East only) 1996–2005: 2.2 L (134 cu in), GM Family II engine I4, MPFI, 138 hp (103 kW)/144 lb⋅ft (195 N⋅m)

==== Indonesian engines ====
- 1997–2005: 2.2 L (134 cu in) SOHC 8-valve, GM Family II engine (22NEC) I4, MPFI, 114 hp (85 kW)/133 lb⋅ft (180 N⋅m) (SLi and Montera (LN, LS, LV, Sport, XR))
- 1996–2005: 2.2 L (134 cu in) DOHC 16-valve, GM Family II engine (22SEC) I4, MPFI, 138 hp (103 kW)/144 lb⋅ft (195 N⋅m) (DOHC and LT)
- 2000–2003: 4.3 L (262 cu in) OHV 12-valve, GM Vortec 4300 (L35) V6, CPFI, 193 hp (144 kW)/249 lb⋅ft (338 N⋅m) (V6 4x4)

==== Brazilian engines ====
- 1996–2001: 2.2 L (134 cu in), GM Family II engine I4, MPFI, 106 hp (79 kW)/144 lb⋅ft (195 N⋅m)
- 2001–2011: 2.4 L (145 cu in), GM Family II engine I4, MPFI, 128 hp (95 kW)/158 lb⋅ft (214 N⋅m)
- 1996–2001: 4.3 L (262 cu in), Vortec 4300 V6, 180 hp (134 kW)/250 lb⋅ft (339 N⋅m)
- 2001–2005: 4.3 L (262 cu in), Vortec 4300 V6, 192 hp (143 kW)/250 lb⋅ft (339 N⋅m)
- 1996–2011: 2.8 L (170 cu in), MWM Sprint 2.8 Turbo Diesel I4, 140 hp (104 kW)/250 lb⋅ft (339 N⋅m)

== Sales in Brazil ==
Year	Brazil
2003	2,263
2004	3,001
2005	3,803
2006	1,685
2007	1,941
2008	2,593
2009	2,685
2010	2,480
2011	1,522
2012	491
