= Moraine, Ohio =

- City
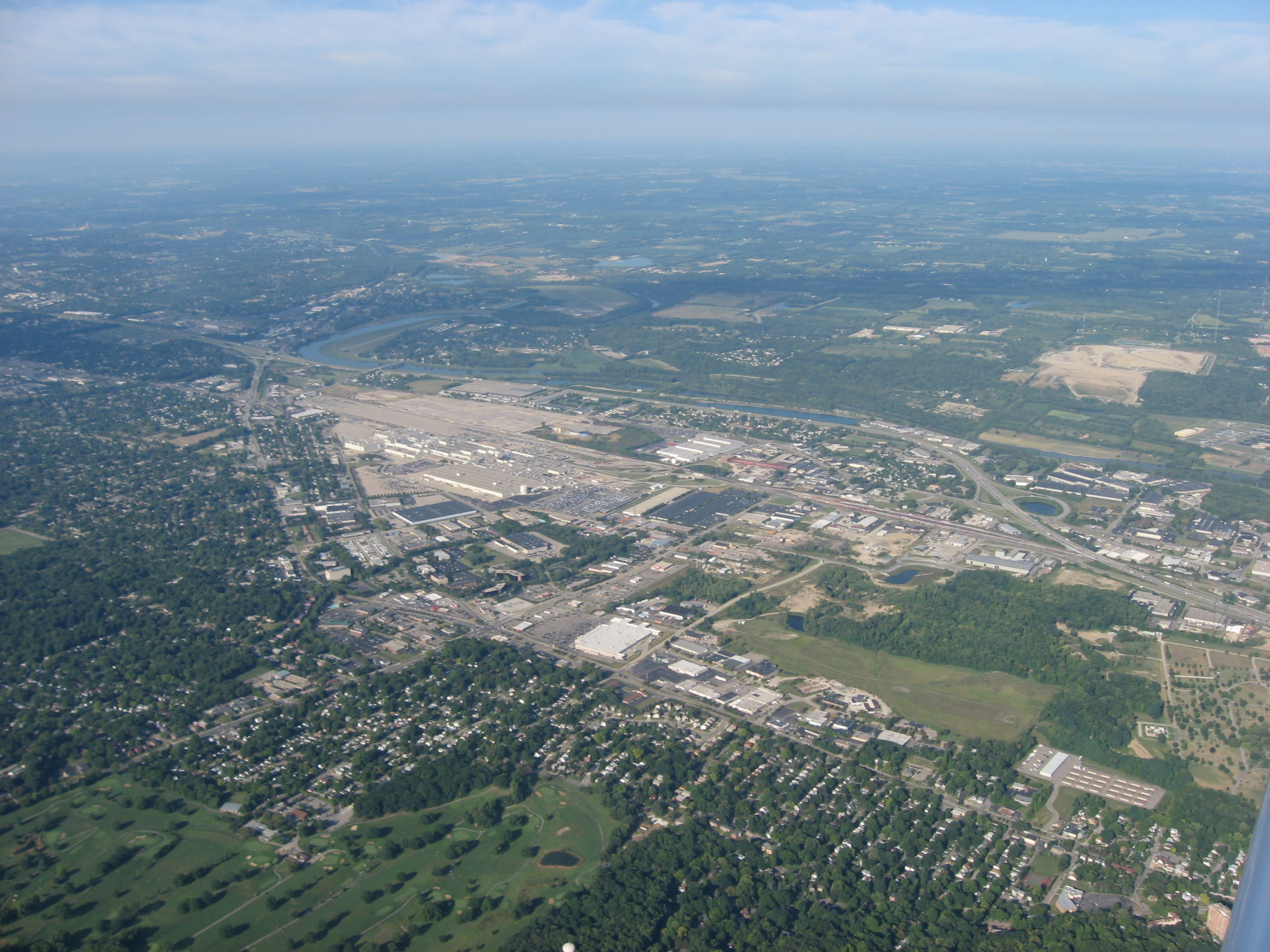
- An aerial view of Moraine
- Motto: "Progress Through Unity"
- Interactive map of Moraine, Ohio
- Location within Ohio Location within the United States
- Coordinates: 39°41′44″N 84°15′46″W
- Country: United States
- State: Ohio
- County: Montgomery

Government
  - Mayor: Teri Murphy

Area
  - Total: 9.55 sq mi (24.73 km^{2})
  - Land: 9.28 sq mi (24.04 km^{2})
  - Water: 0.27 sq mi (0.69 km^{2})
- Elevation: 840 ft (260 m)

Population (2020)
  - Total: 6,393
  - Density: 688.8/sq mi (265.94/km^{2})
- Time zone: UTC-5 (Eastern (EST))
  - Summer (DST): UTC-4 (EDT)
- ZIP code: 45439
- Area codes: 937, 326
- FIPS code: 39-52010
- GNIS feature ID: 1086676
- Website: http://www.ci.moraine.oh.us

Moraine is a city in Montgomery County, Ohio, United States. Situated on the banks of the Great Miami River, Moraine is an inner suburb of Dayton, Ohio and a part of the Dayton metropolitan area. The population was 6,393 at the 2020 census.

== History ==
What is now the city of Moraine was once a part of Van Buren Township followed by a brief period as a part of Kettering. Much of Kettering's portion seceded in 1953 and formed the new Moraine Township. The township incorporated as a village in 1957. After annexing portions of Miami Township, Moraine incorporated as a city in 1965. Moraine later annexed parts of Jefferson Township.

Howard Johnson, the operator of the Moraine Airpark, was mayor of the city from 1976 to 1993.

=== Manufacturing ===
Moraine is known for its manufacturing history. From 1917 to 1923 the Dayton Wright Airplane company operated an aircraft manufacturing plant on the current site of the Moraine Assembly. During its years of operation over 4000 aircraft were built including the DeHavilland observer/bomber plane (a First World War British design).

Dayton-Wright was sold to General Motors in 1919 and GM exited the aircraft business in 1923. In 1926, General Motors enlarged and upgraded the plant and used it to build refrigerators. Frigidaire continued to manufacture appliances on the site until 1979 when GM sold Frigidaire.

However, General Motors decided to keep the plant and retool it to produce vehicles. In 1981 the plant reopened and manufactured the Chevrolet S-10 Blazer and GMC S-15 Jimmy. In the 1990s a paint shop, and the DMAX engine plant was added to the site as a joint venture with Isuzu. The plant continued to manufacture SUVs from the General Motors product line (Chevrolet, GMC, Oldsmobile, Buick) until 2008 when the plant closed. The DMAX engine plant still remains open as a separate facility, and has received a $60 million upgrade in 2014. Through 2008, the total history of the plant included 86 years of manufacturing.

In 2014, GM Moraine Assembly was purchased from IRG by China-based Fuyao Glass Industry Group Co. Ltd. Fuyao manufactures automotive glass for GM and other automakers. They began operations in late 2015, with plans to employ 800 people at the plant. The operations were the subject of the documentary American Factory.

== Geography ==
According to the United States Census Bureau, the city has a total area of 9.52 square miles (24.66 km^{2}), of which 9.25 square miles (23.96 km^{2}) is land and 0.27 square miles (0.70 km^{2}) is water.

== Demographics ==
Historical population
Census	Pop.	Note	%±
1960	2,262		—
1970	4,898		116.5%
1980	5,325		8.7%
1990	5,985		12.4%
2000	6,897		15.2%
2010	6,307		−8.6%
2020	6,393		1.4%
2025 (est.)	6,627		3.7%

=== 2010 census ===
As of the census of 2010, there were 6,307 people, 2,613 households, and 1,625 families residing in the city. The population density was 681.8 inhabitants per square mile (263.2/km^{2}). There were 2,918 housing units at an average density of 315.5 per square mile (121.8/km^{2}). The racial makeup of the city was 81.1% White, 12.4% African American, 0.3% Native American, 1.3% Asian, 0.1% Pacific Islander, 2.4% from other races, and 2.5% from two or more races. Hispanic or Latino of any race were 3.6% of the population.

There were 2,613 households, of which 31.3% had children under the age of 18 living with them, 38.2% were married couples living together, 17.8% had a female householder with no husband present, 6.2% had a male householder with no wife present, and 37.8% were non-families. 30.8% of all households were made up of individuals, and 9.7% had someone living alone who was 65 years of age or older. The average household size was 2.37 and the average family size was 2.96.

The median age in the city was 37 years. 23.7% of residents were under the age of 18; 9.5% were between the ages of 18 and 24; 27.5% were from 25 to 44; 26.8% were from 45 to 64; and 12.7% were 65 years of age or older. The gender makeup of the city was 48.9% male and 51.1% female.

=== 2000 census ===
As of the census of 2000, there were 6,897 people, 2,855 households, and 1,818 families residing in the city. The population density was 760.3 inhabitants per square mile (293.6/km^{2}). There were 3,127 housing units at an average density of 344.7 per square mile (133.1/km^{2}). The racial makeup of the city was 89.53% White, 6.23% African American, 0.43% Native American, 2.00% Asian, 0.51% from other races, and 1.29% from two or more races. Hispanic or Latino of any race were 1.41% of the population.

There were 2,855 households, out of which 32.2% had children under the age of 18 living with them, 44.0% were married couples living together, 14.5% had a female householder with no husband present, and 36.3% were non-families. 29.2% of all households were made up of individuals, and 6.8% had someone living alone who was 65 years of age or older. The average household size was 2.38 and the average family size was 2.94.

In the city the population was spread out, with 25.4% under the age of 18, 10.4% from 18 to 24, 34.3% from 25 to 44, 19.7% from 45 to 64, and 10.3% who were 65 years of age or older. The median age was 32 years. For every 100 females, there were 99.6 males. For every 100 females age 18 and over, there were 96.1 males.

The median income for a household in the city was $34,341, and the median income for a family was $41,792. Males had a median income of $35,133 versus $23,994 for females. The per capita income for the city was $16,880. About 6.8% of families and 9.6% of the population were below the poverty line, including 11.6% of those under age 18 and 6.1% of those age 65 or over.

== Economy ==
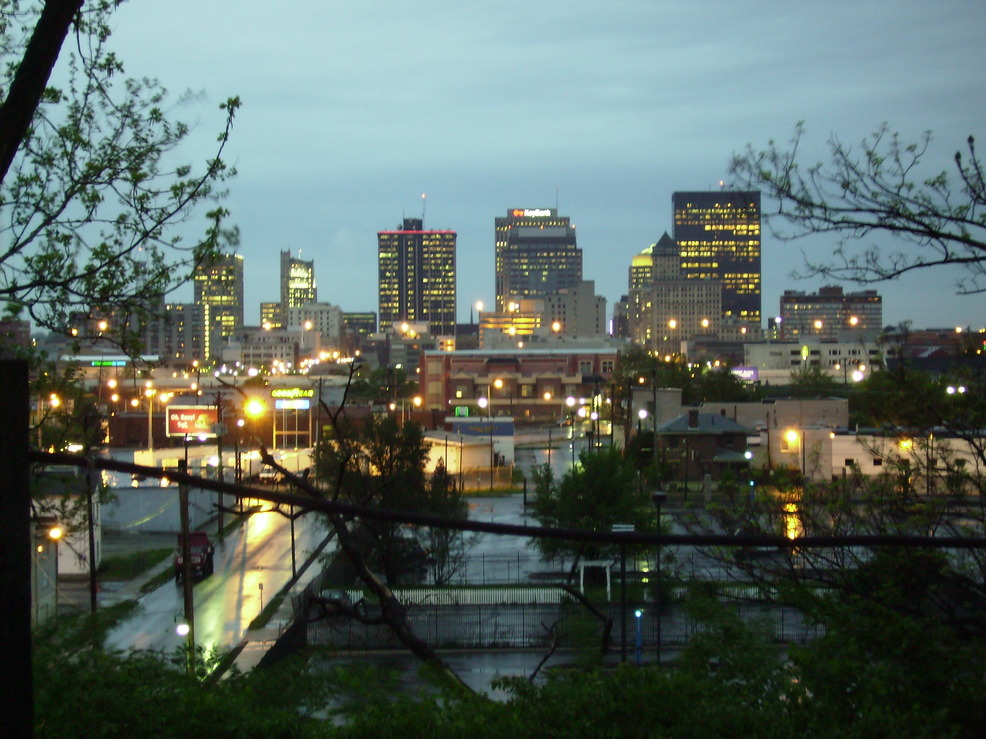
View of downtown Dayton from Moraine.

The GM Moraine Assembly auto plant closed on December 23, 2008, and 2,400 workers lost their jobs. In October 2015, Fuyao Glass America began producing automobile glass in the 1.4 million square foot facility of the former GM Moraine plant. The site now employs more than 2,000 workers. It was purchased from IRG by China-based Fuyao Glass Industry Group Co. Ltd. and began operations in late 2015. Fuyao manufactures automotive glass for GM and other automakers. By the time the plant entered full-scale production in October 2016, the company had invested $1 billion in the U.S. subsidiary, with long-term plans to grow to 5,000 employees in the United States. By the end of 2016, the plant had brought an estimated $280 million to the Ohio economy and employed 2,000 people in Moraine.

The Moraine Airpark is located in the city.

== Parks and recreation ==
Moraine has a parks department that includes an indoor recreational center (Payne Recreation Center), a civic center (Gerhardt), bike trails and system of small neighborhood parks. The Deer Meadow Park has a skate park and pond. The park entrance connects to the city's three-mile bike trail that follows Pinnacle Road to Main Street, then connects to the Great Miami Recreational Trail.

The city offers free garden plots to its residents on 12 acres located in a rural section of the city. Moraine also operates a boat ramp on East River Road to allow access to the Great Miami River, which passes through the center of the city.

== Government ==
Moraine is served by a council–manager form of government, where a seven-member city council appoints a professional city manager, who serves as the administrative head of the city.

The city council of Moraine, Ohio, consists of 7 members. A mayor and two council members-at-large are elected by the entire city, while four additional members of council are elected to represent each of four wards. The mayor presides over meetings of the council as chairman, and may vote as a member of council, but has no veto. In recent years, several mayors have been recalled and removed from office.

Moraine has a municipal income tax of 2%.

== Infrastructure ==
The Interstate 75 interchange allows motorists to enter I-75 North. The entrances include southbound Dixie Drive access to I-75N, northbound Central Avenue access to I-75S, I-75N access to southbound Dixie Drive and I-75S to access South Dixie Drive. The exit was originally built in the early 1960s and never completed into a traditional highway exit until 2012.
