= Moraine Airpark =

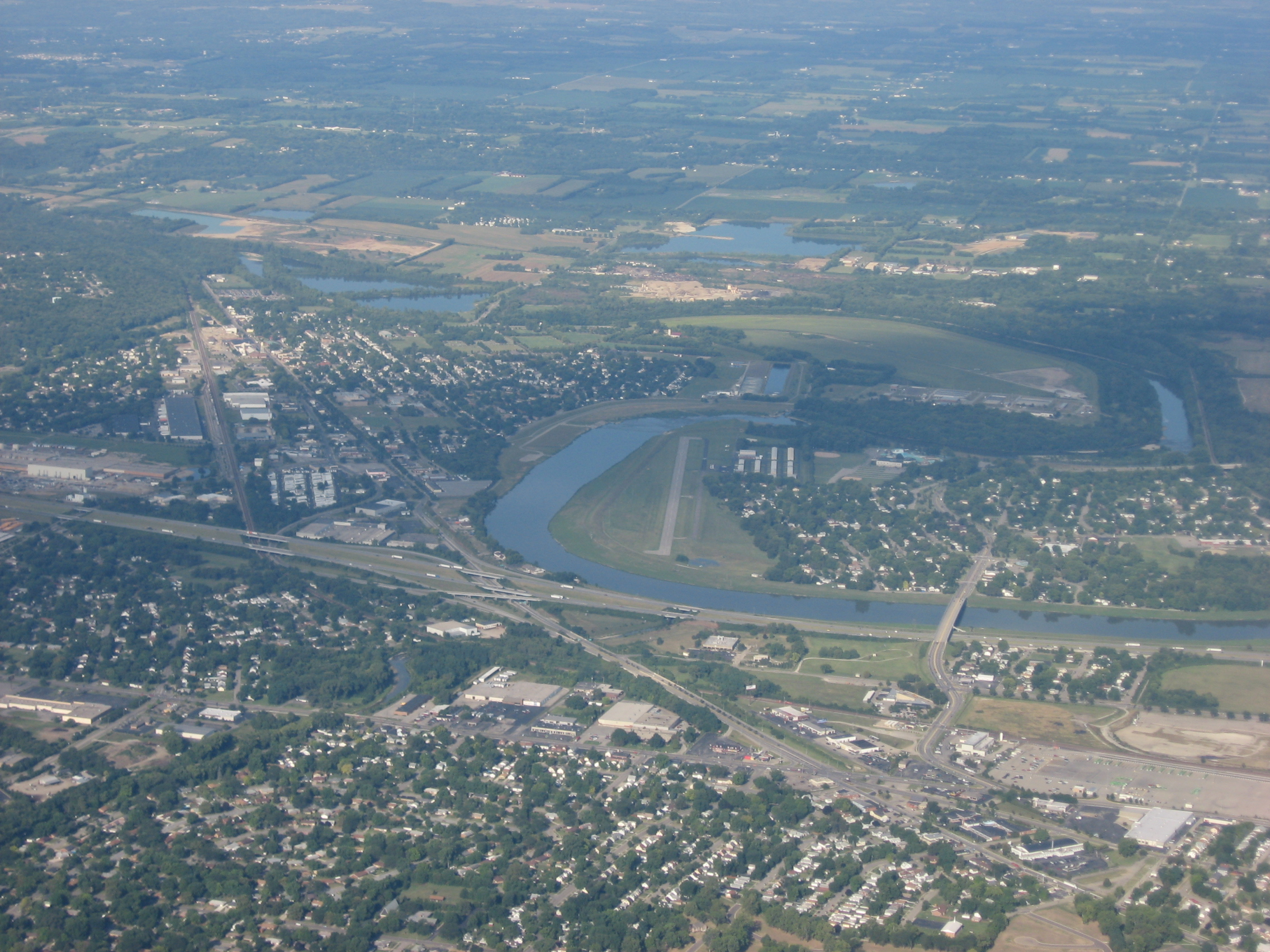
- Aerial view of Moraine Airpark from the east
- IATA: none; ICAO: none; FAA LID: I73

Summary
- Airport type: Public
- Owner: Moraine Airpark, Inc. & Montgomery County
- Serves: Dayton, Ohio
- Location: Moraine, Ohio
- Opened: 1944
- Time zone: UTC−05:00 (-5)
  - Summer (DST): UTC−04:00 (-4)
- Elevation AMSL: 720 ft (220 m)
- Coordinates: 39°40′57″N 084°14′35″W
- Website: www.MoraineAirpark.com

Map
- Location of airport in Ohio I73 (the United States)

Runways
Direction	Length		Surface
Direction	ft	m	Surface
8/26	3,500	1,067	Asphalt

Statistics (2022)
- Aircraft operations: 26,280
- Based aircraft: 111
- Sources: FAA, airport website

Moraine Airpark (FAA LID: I73) is a public-use airport situated in the city of Moraine, Ohio, United States. 4 miles (6.4 km) southwest of the city of Dayton in Montgomery County.

The airpark is the first home base of the National Waco Club. It is also home to a chapter of the Experimental Aircraft Association,EAA Chapter 48 which was established in 1959 which holds Young Eagles Days where young pilots are taken for airplane rides.

The airport holds an annual fly-in in May.

== History ==
The airport is on the site where the Wright Brothers tested seaplanes in 1907. The current airport is adjacent to the river the brothers used, which no longer houses the former seaplane base.

In 1944, Berlin Neff, a recently discharged glider pilot and aerial photography enthusiast, purchased the site and began improving it. By late October 1949, the 37-acre (15 ha) airport had three 1,800 feet (550 m) grass runways, five t-hangars and a fishing pond.

It began to grow in the mid-1950s after pilots displaced by the closing of South Dayton Airport began relocating to the airport. (Note: The original South Dayton Airport opened in December 1941 and closed in July 1954 after being sold for residential development.) By late February 1956, it had expanded to 160 acres (65 ha) and construction on an administration building and hangars had been announced.

The airport was flooded in 1959, destroying over 70 airplanes. A levee to protect an area that included the airport was proposed the following year.

By early July 1969, the city was considering purchasing the airport. Then, in November 1970, five months after it purchased 34 acres (14 ha) of land, the airport announced it was seeking a $50,000 state grant to extend the runway to 4,000 feet (1,200 m).

By mid May 1972, the facility had been renamed Montgomery County–Moraine Airport Airpark.

In 1976, the airport manager, Harold Johnson, was elected mayor of Moraine. (Note: Johnson was known for flying a Waco UMF-3 at airshows where he would pretend to be the Red Baron.)

A fire in late May 1985 destroyed a barn containing seven vintage airplanes that belonged to the airport manager.

The airport received a state grant in May 1988 to extend a taxiway.

The city was considering building an additional access road to the airport in October 1995. However, it required demolishing a local resident's garage.

In 2015, Governor John Kasich was accidentally flown to Dayton International Airport even though arrangements were made to fly him to the Moraine Airpark.

In 2016, the airport was a stop for a light aircraft powered exclusively by biofuel. The pilots, a father and son duo, were flying across the United states in the aircraft.

== Facilities and aircraft ==
Moraine Airpark covers an area of 155 acres (63 ha), which contains one asphalt paved runway, designated as runway 8/26. The runway measures 3,500 x 65 ft (1,067 x 20 m).

The airport has a fixed base operator that offers avgas and courtesy transportation.

For the 12-month period ending September 8, 2022, the airport had 26,280 aircraft operations, an average of 72 per day: 79% general aviation, 20% air taxi, and <1% military. This is down from 87,263 at the airport, an average of 239 per day, in 2007. In 2022, there were 111 aircraft based at the airport: 104 single-engine and 2 multi-engine airplanes, 3 ultralights, 1 helicopter, and 1 glider.

== Accidents and incidents ==
- On 25 September 1951, a Stinson crashed after it hit trees while taking off from the airport, injuring the pilot and two passengers.
- On 19 January 1958, a Piper PA-20 Pacer crashed shortly after taking off from the airport, killing the pilot and two passengers.
- On 2 April 1961, a Piper J5A crashed shortly after taking off from the airport, killing a passenger.
- On 15 June 1972, a Midget Mustang crashed near the airport, killing the pilot.
- On 26 October 1974, a Piper PA-28 crashed after taking off from the airport, killing the pilot and an instructor.
- On 15 November 1987, an airplane overturned while making an emergency landing in the Great Miami River due to an engine failure shortly after taking off from the airport.
- On 20 August 2000, an airplane stalled, crashed and caught fire while landing at the airport, injuring the pilot and a passenger.
- On July 17, 2002, a Waco UPF-7 and a homebuilt Kitfox IV collided at the Moraine Airpark.
- On October 2, 2002, a Beagle Aircraft B.206 Basset was destroyed after impacting terrain after departing from the Moraine Airpark.
- On July 18, 2004, a Cessna 172 Skyhawk crashed during a go-around at the Moraine Airpark.
- On June 17, 2008, a Helton Lark 95 crashed after takeoff from the Moraine Airpark.
- On November 16, 2022, a single-engine Piper PA24 Comanche aircraft landed with its landing gear retracted at the Moraine Airpark.

== See also ==
- List of airports in Ohio
