= RPO ZR2 =

Off-road option package of General Motors trucks

ZR2 Option Package
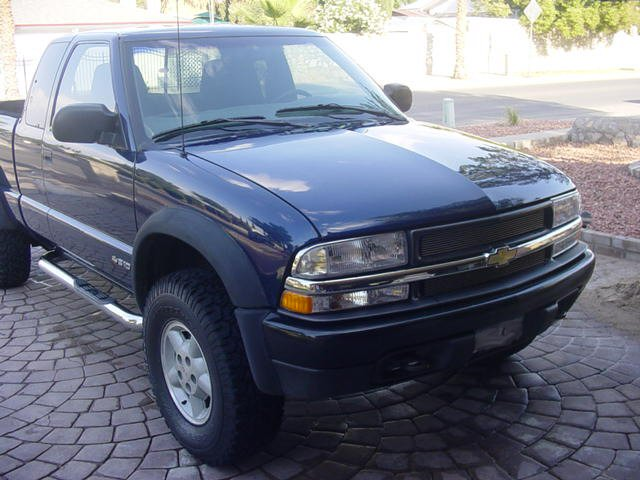

Overview
- Manufacturer: Chevrolet/GMC (General Motors)
- Model years: 1994–2005, 2017–present

Body and chassis
- Class: Compact Pickup Truck / SUV

Regular Production Option ZR2 is a special off-road/suspension package offered by General Motors. It was originally offered exclusively on their mid-size pickup trucks and SUVs before later being offered on both mid-size and full-size trucks.
The ZR2 package debuted in 1994 on the Chevrolet S-10 and the GMC Sonoma pickup trucks. The Sonoma ZR2 was known as ZR2 High-Rider. In 1996 it was expanded to the two-door Chevrolet Blazer and later offered on the Chevrolet Tracker. The ZR2 package was gradually phased out with the S-Series pickup and SUV lines. However, it has made a comeback as an option on the 2017 Chevrolet Colorado.

== Colorado ==
Chevrolet Colorado ZR2
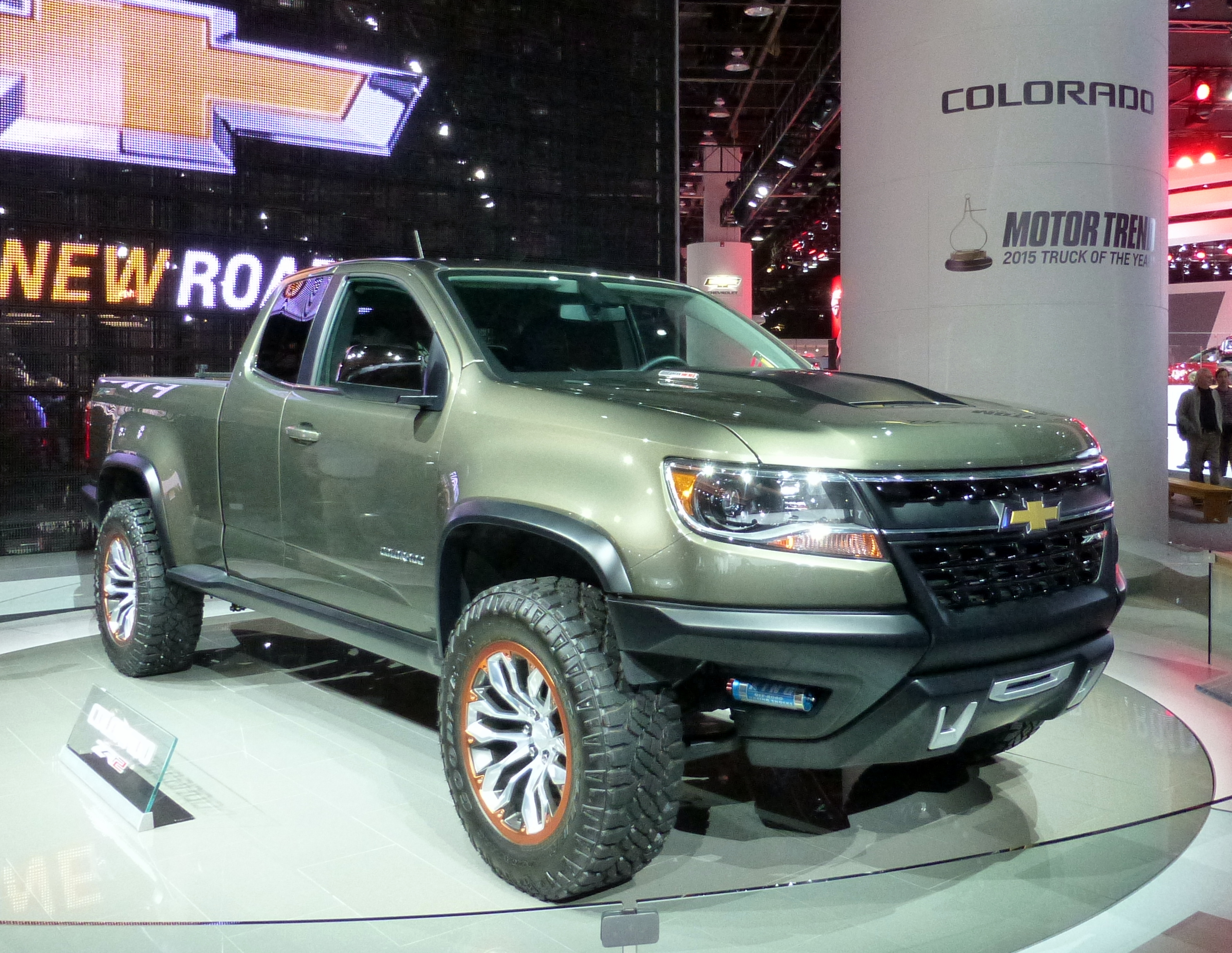

Overview
- Model years: 2017–present

=== Features ===
- Standard 3.6L DI DOHC V6 with 308 horsepower and 275 lb-ft of torque
- Optional 2.8L Duramax Turbo-Diesel engine with 186 horsepower and 369 lb-ft of torque
- Front and rear wheel flares
- 2" front and rear lift
- 3.5" wider stance
- 31" Goodyear Wrangler Duratrac off-road tires
- Exclusive ZR2 17 x 8-inch aluminum alloy wheels
- Modified rear axle with a 3.42 ratio
- Front and rear electronic locking differentials
- Multimatic™ shocks (DSSV)
- Tubular rocker protection
- Modified front and rear bumpers for better off-road obstacle clearance
- Skid plates
- Aggressive grille and hood combo unique to ZR2
- Off-Road Mode Technology - Seamlessly pick between Desert, Mud or Mountains
- Optional full-size bed-mounted spare tire carrier

== S-Series ==
S-Series ZR2
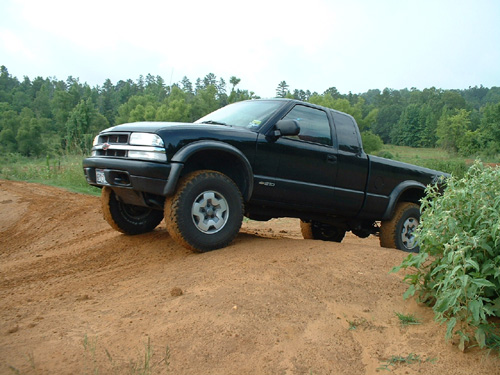

Overview
- Model years: 1994–2005

=== Features ===
- Ladder-type Frame with modified mounting points
- 100mm wider track (3.9 inches wider than regular S-10)
- Increased ground clearance (Approx 3" over Regular S-Series 4x4)
- Enhanced front (7.25" ring gear) and rear (8.5" ring gear) axles w/ 3.73:1 rear-axle ratio
- Larger wheel and axle bearings
- 31 x 10.50" BFG A/T Tires (Pickup), 31 x 10.50" BFG Longtrails (Blazer)
- 46mm gas pressurized Bilstein Monotube shocks
- Rear track bar (Pickup), Rear anti-sway bar (Blazer)
- Skid plates
- Fender flares

== Tracker ==
Chevrolet Tracker ZR2
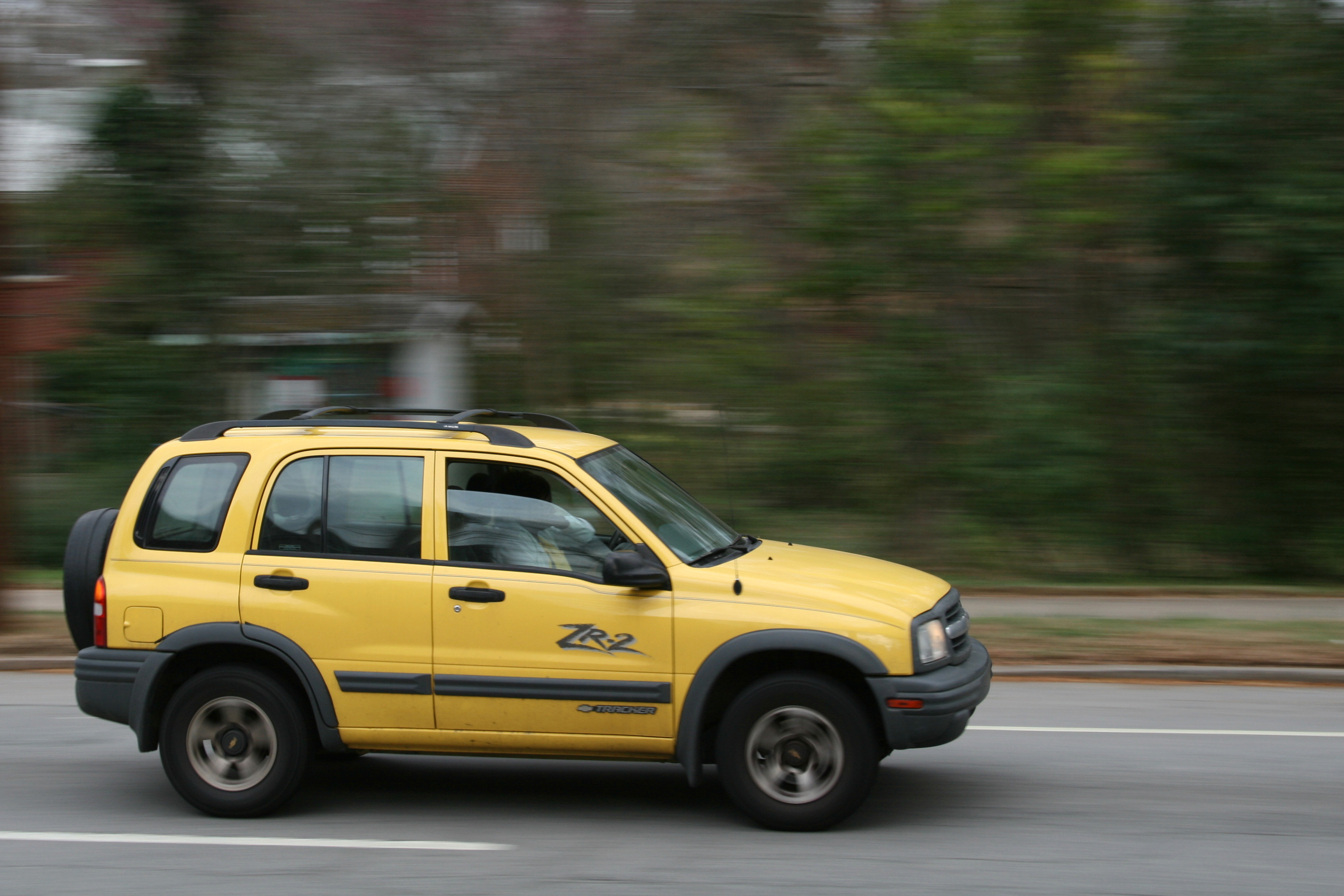

Overview
- Model years: 2001-2004

=== Features ===
- Front and rear wheel flares
- P215/75R-15 all-season tires
- Exclusive ZR2 alloy wheels
- Standard power windows and mirrors
- Front skid plate

== History ==
- 1994 - ZR2 package is introduced with the Regular Cab second-generation S-Series Pickups
- 1995 - ZR2 package expanded to Extended Cab S-Series Pickups
- 1996 - ZR2 package extended to two-door Blazer models. Third door was offered on extended cab models.
- 1998 - Disc brakes are now standard on the front and rear wheels. Interior updated along with front grille and headlights.
- 1999 - GM replaces the aluminum skid plates with composite skid plates. Side mirrors are updated. (much stronger)
  - Last model year the ZR2 option was offered on a regular-cab pickup.
- 2001 - ZR2 package extended to Chevrolet Tracker
- 2002 - ZR2 Trackers were upgraded to the LT trim level, offering optional leather upholstery
- 2003 - During the production year, ZR2s begin shipping with General Ameritrac tires instead of BF Goodrich tires.
  - GM discontinues S-Series Pickups. This is the last year that the ZR2 is available on a pickup.
  - A GMC Jimmy ZR2 surfaces in Canada. The Jimmy ZR2 was unavailable in the USA.
- 2004 - ZR2 available on Blazer and Tracker models. For the first time, the ZR2 is offered in 2WD.
  - GM discontinues Tracker including ZR2 model.
- 2005 - This is the last year for the ZR2 Blazer (USA) and Jimmy (Canada)
  - GM discontinues all remaining S-Series models. RPO ZR2 is phased out.
- 2017 - GM reintroduces the ZR2 option on the Chevrolet Colorado.
- 2022 - GM introduces the ZR2 option on the Chevrolet Silverado 1500.
- 2023 - GM introduces the ZR2 option on the Chevrolet Silverado 2500HD.
