= ZQ8 =

Product code for automobile

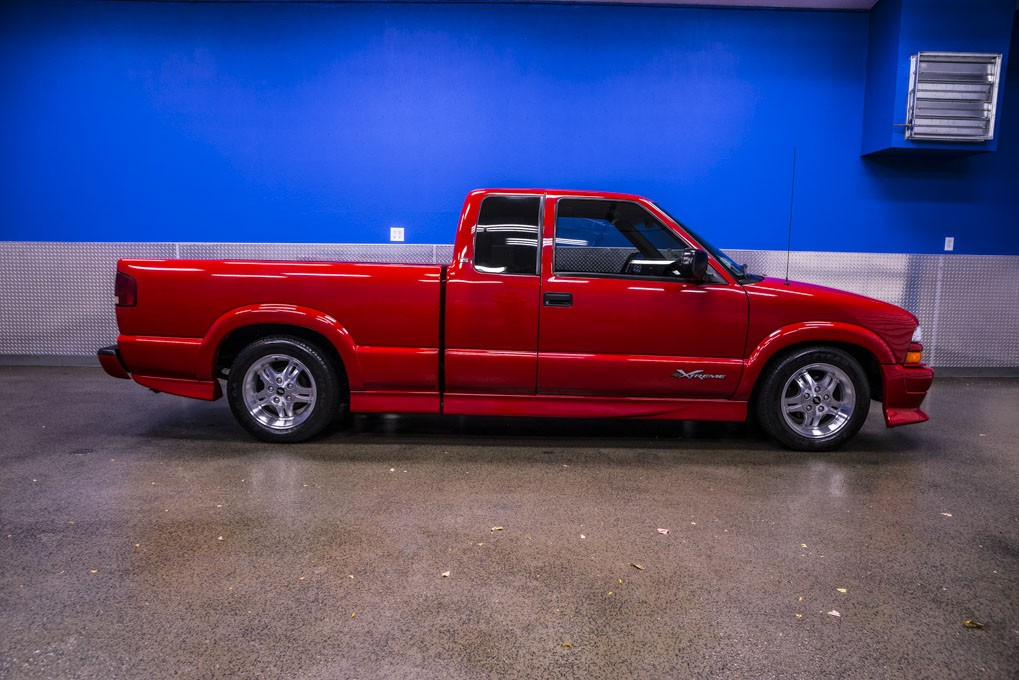
2002 Chevrolet S10 Xtreme with metal center caps.

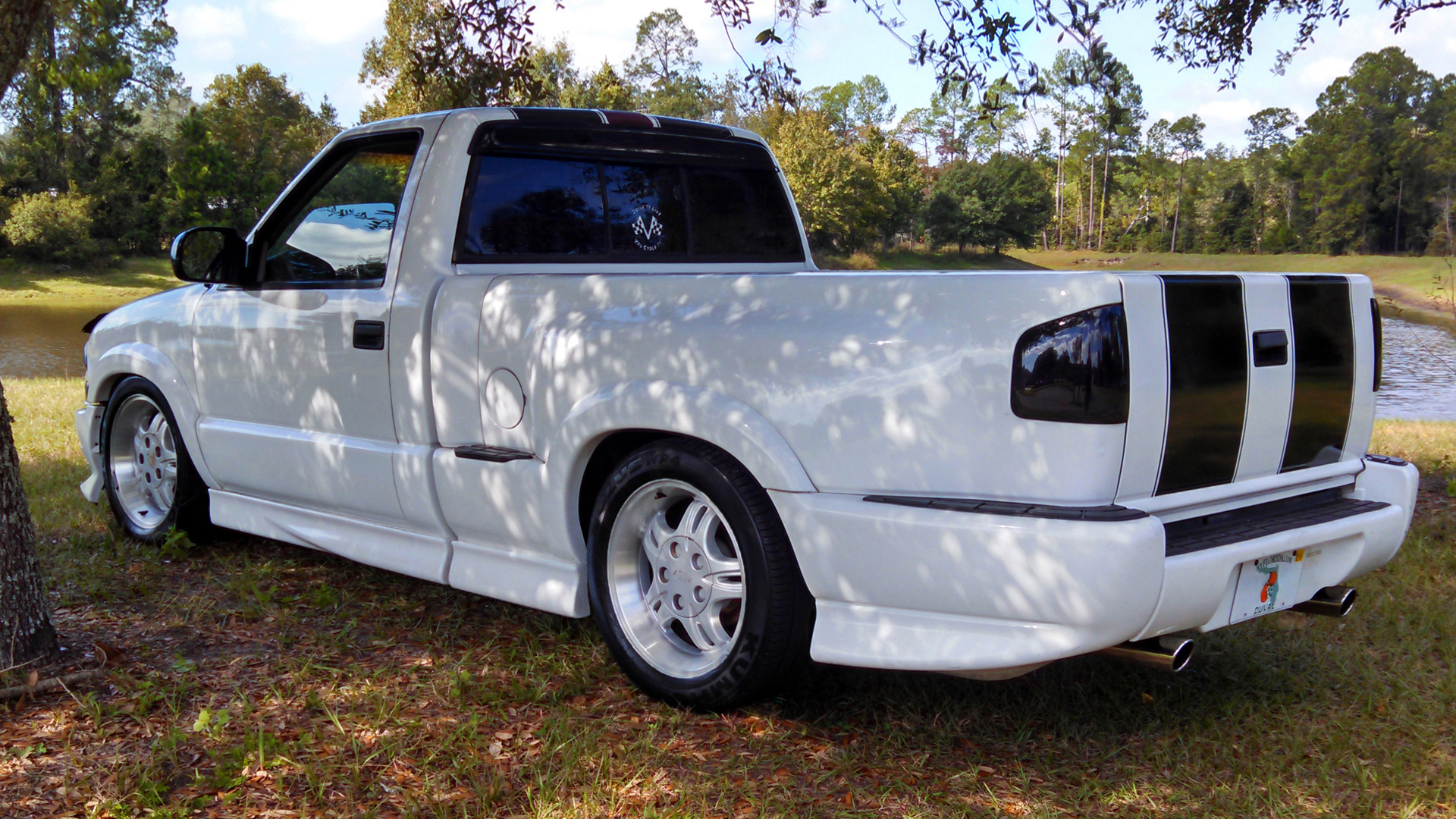
1999 Chevrolet S10 Xtreme with plastic center caps.

ZQ8 is an RPO code designation for the Chevrolet S-10, GMC Sonoma, and Chevrolet Colorado.

== Chevrolet S-10 and GMC Sonoma ==
The ZQ8 option suspension package comes standard on the 1999-2003 S-10 Xtreme and 1996-1998 S-10 SS models, but was also available as a sports package on either the S-10 or GMC Sonoma. The package included a total lowered ride height of approximately 2 in (51 mm) over stock (1.5 in (38 mm) from suspension, approx. 0.5 in (13 mm) from shorter tire diameter), thicker front sway bar (1.3 in (33 mm)), rear sway bar (0.91 in (23 mm)), quicker ratio (12:1) steering box, upgraded Decarbon or Bilstein gas shock absorbers, ZQ8 specific bump stops and a frame brace. Some ZQ8 models were also equipped with a frame to axle "anti-hop" shock.

The lowered stance was achieved using front coils with a different spring rate, and a 3-leaf rear spring pack.

Wheels and tires were also upgraded to 16 in × 8 in (41 cm × 20 cm) cast aluminum wheel with 235/55/16 Goodyear Eagle GA tires. The Xtreme package used a different style wheel than a standard truck equipped with the ZQ8 option. There are 2 versions of "ZQ8" wheels - 1996-2000 (also standard on 1996-1998 SS trucks), similar in design to 3rd generation Camaro wheels, and 2001-2003 (also used on Blazer Xtremes from 2004 to 2005), which bear a resemblance to an IROC Z28 wheel. Another variation among different models was in the center caps. S-10s and Sonomas used a grey center cap with the exception of the 2002-2003 S-10s, which featured a chrome center cap.

The suspension package can be retrofit to any 1982-2003 2wd S-Series truck, although some parts require modification, such as drilling for sway bar mounts or boring the hub on the wheels for a 1982-1993 truck. Also of note, since the package came on I4 and V6 trucks, spring rates in the coils do vary.
