= Chevrolet S-10 =

Chevrolet S-10 GMC S-15/Sonoma
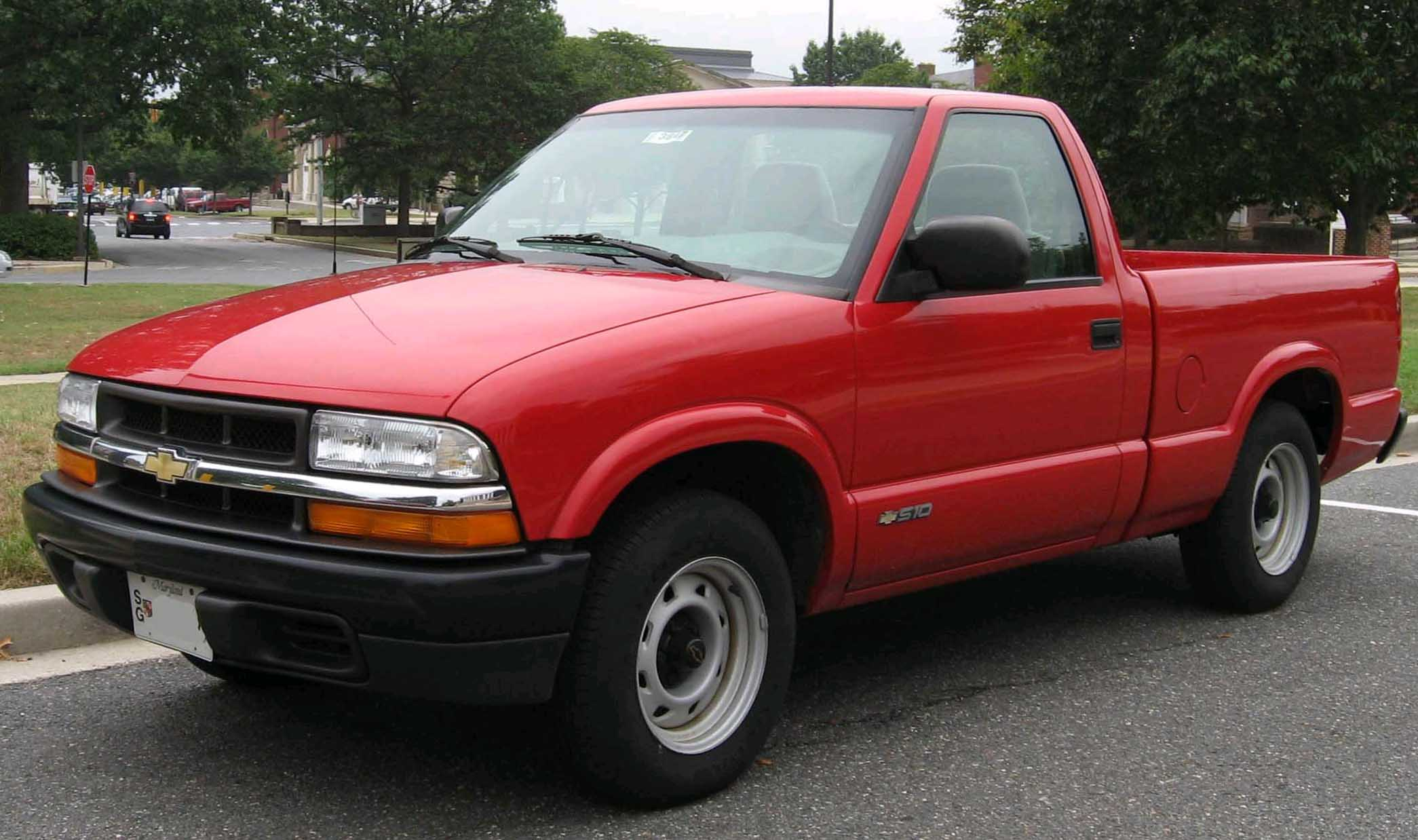
- 1998–2004 Chevrolet S-10

Overview
- Manufacturer: General Motors
- Production: 1981–2004 (North America); 1995–2012 (2nd gen North-American S-10); 2012–present (2nd gen Colorado as S-10) (Brazil)

Body and chassis
- Class: Compact pickup truck
- Layout: Front engine, rear-wheel drive / four-wheel drive

Chronology
- Predecessor: Chevrolet LUV
- Successor: Chevrolet Colorado / GMC Canyon

The Chevrolet S-10 is a compact pickup truck produced by Chevrolet. It was the first domestically-built compact pickup of the big three American automakers. When it was first introduced as a "quarter-ton pickup" in 1981 for the 1982 model year, the GMC version was known as the S-15 and later renamed the GMC Sonoma. A high-performance version of the latter was released in 1991, called "Syclone". The pickup was also sold by Isuzu as the Hombre from 1996 through 2000, but only in North America. There was also an SUV version, the Chevrolet S-10 Blazer/GMC S-15 Jimmy. An electric version was leased as a fleet vehicle in 1997 and 1998. These models are sometimes internally referred to as the S/T series to denote two- and four-wheel-drive models respectively (similar to the full-size Chevrolet C/K trucks) despite all versions being badged with "S" nomenclature.

In North America, the S-series was replaced by the Chevrolet Colorado, GMC Canyon, and Isuzu i-Series in 2004.

The S-series ended production in Brazil in 2012, being replaced by the Chevrolet Colorado, but still with the name S-10.

== First generation (1982) ==
First generation
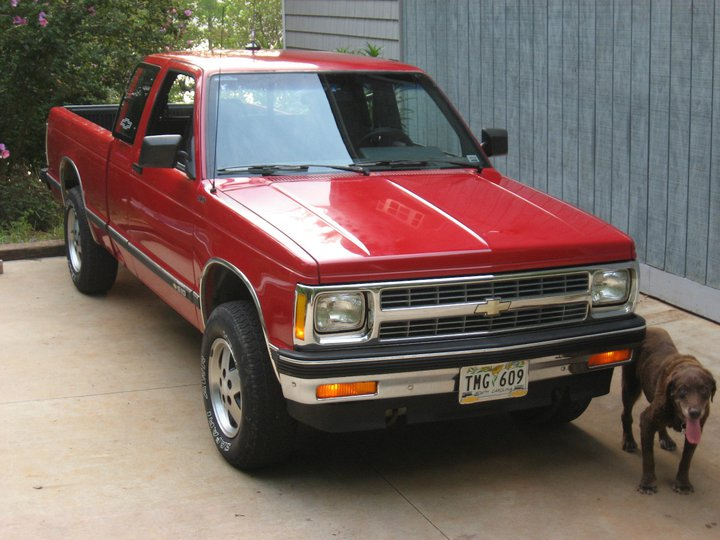
- 1992 Chevrolet S-10 Tahoe

Overview
- Also called: Chevrolet Patriot S-10 (Kuwait); GMC S-15; GMC Sonoma; Jinbei GMC S-10 (China)
- Production: 1981–1993
- Model years: 1982–1993
- Assembly: Moraine, Ohio (Moraine Assembly); Shreveport, Louisiana (Shreveport Assembly); Pontiac, Michigan (Pontiac West Assembly); Shenyang, China (Jinbei)

Body and chassis
- Platform: GMT325
- Related: Chevrolet S-10 Blazer / GMC S15 Jimmy; GMC Syclone; GMC Typhoon; Oldsmobile Bravada; Grumman LLV

Powertrain
- Engine: Gasoline: 1.95 L LR1 I4; 2.0 L LQ2 I4; 2.5 L L38/LN8 I4; 2.8 L LR2/LL2 V6; 4.3 L L35/LB4 V6; Diesel: 2.2 L LQ7 I4
- Transmission: 3-speed THM-200C automatic; 4-speed Isuzu S101 manual; 4-speed BorgWarner T4 manual; 4-speed 700R4 automatic; 4-speed 4L60 automatic; 4-speed 4L60-E automatic; 5-speed Getrag 290 manual; 5-speed 5LM60 manual; 5-speed NV3500 manual; 5-speed BorgWarner T5 manual

Dimensions
- Wheelbase: 108.3 in (2,751 mm) (reg. cab short bed); 117.9 in (2,995 mm) (reg. cab long bed); 122.9 in (3,122 mm) (ext. cab short bed)

After the 1973 Arab oil embargo, the demand for smaller and more affordable utility vehicles had increased in North America. General Motors' initial response to this was the Chevrolet Light Utility Vehicle (LUV), a rebadged Isuzu KB which was introduced in 1972 as the first compact truck from the Big Three automakers. However, the American chicken tax stated that imported utility vehicles would be subject to a 25% tax charge. This meant that, despite the U.S. branding, the LUV's Japanese origins made it expensive and complicated to import, with many needing to be shipped disassembled to get around the tax. To solve this, GM opted to replace the LUV with a domestically built compact truck which would no longer be subject to the chicken tax. As usual, parts from other GM chassis lines (primarily from the GM G-body intermediates) were incorporated. Track width was similar to the former GM H-body subcompacts (Vega/Monza). The first S-series pickups were introduced in 1981 for the 1982 model year. The base engine (manufactured in Japan and imported) was a 1.9 L Isuzu four-cylinder (RPO LR1) shared with the LUV and Isuzu P'up, with a 2.8 L V6 as an option. The Chevrolet and GMC models were identical apart from the grille, tailgate and assorted insignia. For 1983, an extended cab, called "Maxi-Cab" on Chevrolet models and "Club Coupe" on GMCs, and "Insta-Trac" four-wheel drive were added, along with two new engines: a 2.0 L four-cylinder engine (RPO LQ2) from the J-platform automobiles along with an Isuzu 2.2 L (RPO LQ7) four-cylinder diesel engine.

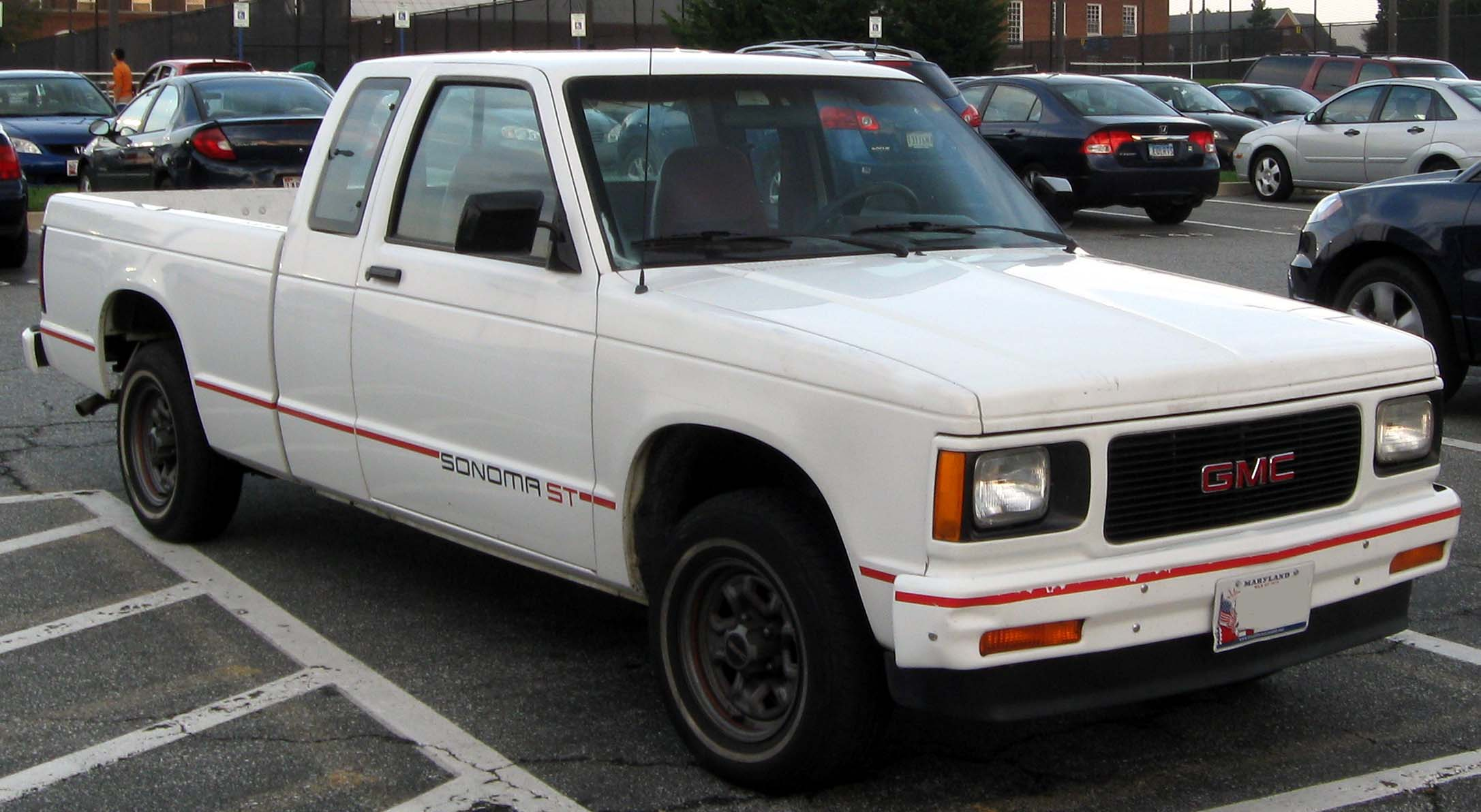
1991–1993 GMC Sonoma ST extended cab

The sport utility S-10 Blazer and S-15 Jimmy debuted for 1983; GM was the first to introduce the compact sport utility, followed by Ford and then Jeep the following year. Following the popularity of the Jeep Cherokee, 4-door SUV variants were introduced in March 1990 as 1991 models alongside the badge-engineered Oldsmobile Bravada.

New heavy-duty and off-road suspensions appeared in 1984 along with a hydraulic clutch, while the big news for 1985 was the discontinuation of the Cavalier's 2.0 L OHV I4 in favor of Pontiac's 2.5 L "Iron Duke" OHV I4. The 2.2 L OHV diesel engine and 1.9 L SOHC gas engine, both from Isuzu, were gone the next year, leaving just the Iron Duke and updated 2.8 L V6. A much-welcomed 4.3 L V6 was added for 1988, and anti-lock brakes came the next year.

The GMC S-15 became the GMC Sonoma in 1991, and the Sierra trim packages were dropped to avoid confusion with the new GMC Sierra full-size pickup. The GMC Syclone also appeared that year, with an SUV version, the GMC Typhoon, making its debut the year after that. The Sonoma GT bowed in 1992. Added to this was the 4.3 L V6 Vortec W-code engine. This generation's last year was 1993.

=== Appearance packages ===
The S-10 Baja was an optional appearance package that was put on any four-wheel-drive S-10 (regular-cab with short-box, regular-cab with long box, and extended-cab with short box) from 1989 to 1991. The Baja was available in three colors: Midnight Black, Apple Red and Frost White. The Baja option also included a roll bar with off-road lights, front tubular grille guard with fog lights, tubular rear bumper, an underbody shield package (transfer case shield, front differential shield, fuel tank shield, oil pan/steering linkage shields), a suspension package, Chevrolet windshield banner, Baja decals on the box sides, and one inch wide body striping. Extra-cost Baja options included a cargo-net end-gate, aluminum "Outlaw" wheels, and a special box-mounted spare tire carrier with aluminum wheel. 1991 S-10 Bajas came with special "BAJA" embroidered red and gray bucket seats and unique red door panel trim.

The S-10 Cameo and Cameo EL were appearance packages available for the two-wheel drive S-10 between 1989 and 1991. When first introduced in 1989, the Cameo had three color choices; Apple Red, Frost White or Midnight Black. In 1991, two-tone paint schemes were available, as well as additional exterior features such as a wraparound front bumper with fog lamps, lower body ground-effects moldings and wheel flares, a flush-fitting tailgate valance, rear roll pan (state laws permitting), and "Cameo" lettering on the doors and tailgate. Other appearance packages included the S-10 Back Country (predecessor to the Baja), the S-10 Top Gun edition, the GMC Sonoma SST, the GMC S-15 Gypsy Magic, and GMC Jimmy Magic.

=== Sonoma GT ===
Debuting in 1992, the GMC Sonoma GT was a performance package available on the two-wheel-drive, regular-cab, short-bed Sonoma, and was offered as a lower-priced alternative to its predecessor, the 1991 Syclone. The Sonoma GT was powered by an enhanced Vortec non-turbocharged 4.3L L35 V6. It featured central multi-port fuel injection and produced 195 hp (145 kW) and 260 lb⋅ft (353 N⋅m) of torque. It was equipped with a 4L60 automatic transmission and a limited-slip differential with 3.42:1 gearing. Because the Sonoma GT was not built to be performance-oriented like the Syclone, it still retained its payload capacity and towing ratings meaning that the owner could still use it like a pickup truck if they so desired.

Modified by Production Automotive Services of Troy, Michigan, the Sonoma GT featured a unique "Syclone-inspired" cladding kit. While sharing the same front and rear bumper as the Syclone (and future 92–93 GMC Typhoon), the aero package did not have as much of an aggressive look as the Syclone but still featured bumperettes, lower door skirts, and rear quarter bed corners to round out the cladding package. GMC also decided to follow through with the Syclone theme into the interior which featured the same black and red piping door inserts and bucket seats, but without any headrest logo (the Syclone featured embroidered headrest logos), along with the same center console and shifter as seen in the Syclone. The gauge cluster was also the same setup; however, due to the non-turbocharged powerplant of the Sonoma GT, the boost gauge is not included in the RPM cluster. The Sonoma GT's production only lasted for 1992.

Only 806 Sonoma GTs were ever produced, in a variety of colors such as the standard monochromatic black, apple red, white, aspen blue, teal, and forest green.

Sonoma GT color breakdown:

- 1991 Black w/ Black (1 Total)
- Black w/ Black (406 Total)
- Black w/ Gray (30 Total)
- Frost White w/ Gray (107 Total)
- Apple Red w/ Gray (179 Total)
- Bright Teal w/ Gray (54 Total)
- Forest Green Metallic w/ Gray (15 Total)
- Aspen Blue w/ Gray (15 Total)

=== 1993 Sonoma ===
Some 1992 and 1993 Sonomas came with a factory-equipped L35 W-code engine. For 1993, no specialty labeling or limited-edition tags were known to be used with the W-code engine. Production totals for these vehicles are unknown.

=== 1991 Syclone ===
The Syclone was a high performance package for the 1991 model year. It came with all-wheel drive, 4-wheel anti-lock brakes, and a 4.3-litre LB4 V6 producing 280 hp with lower compression pistons, a turbocharger, and a water intercooler system. Production was limited to just 2998 units.

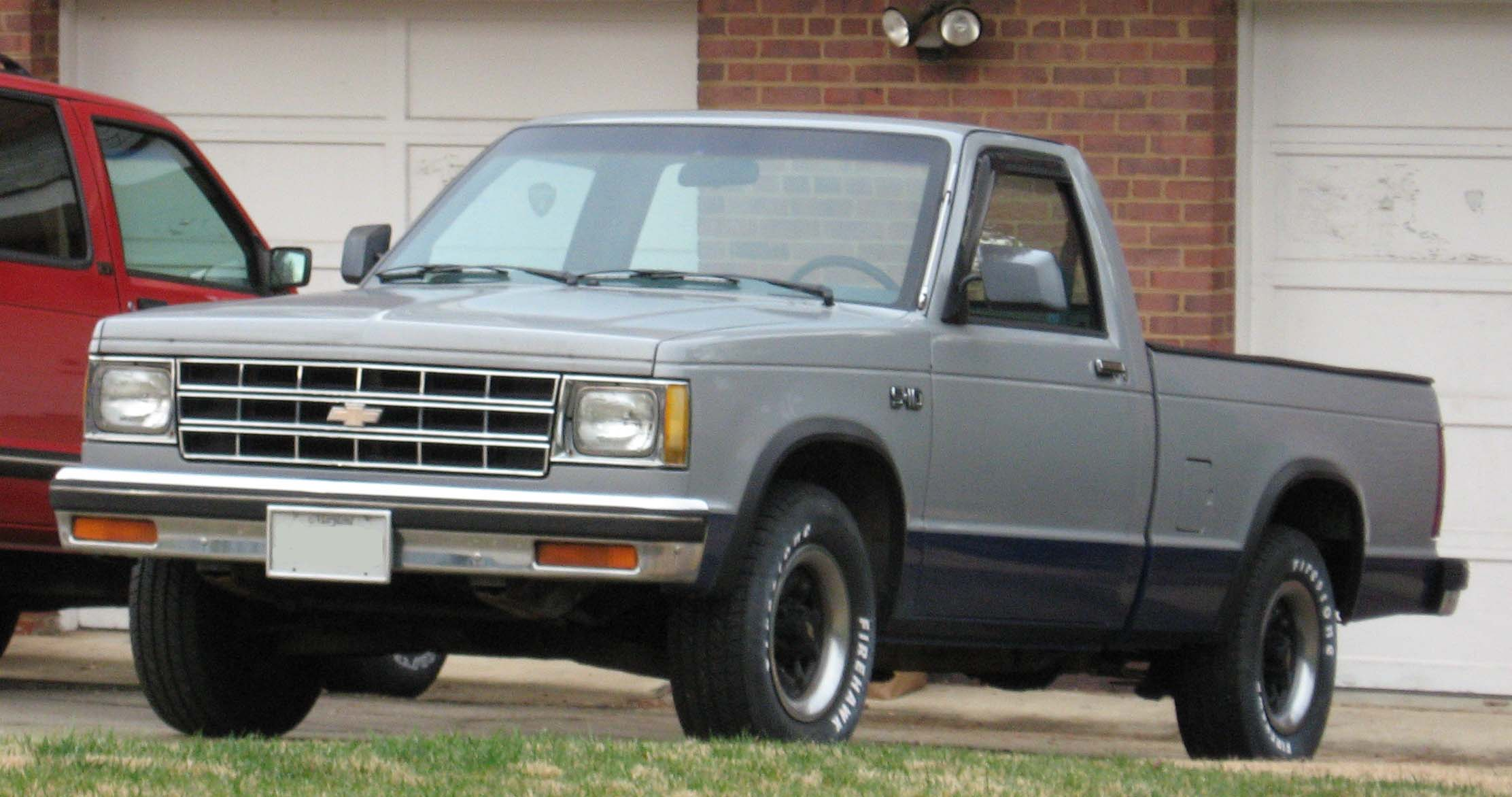
1982–1990 Chevrolet S-10 single cab

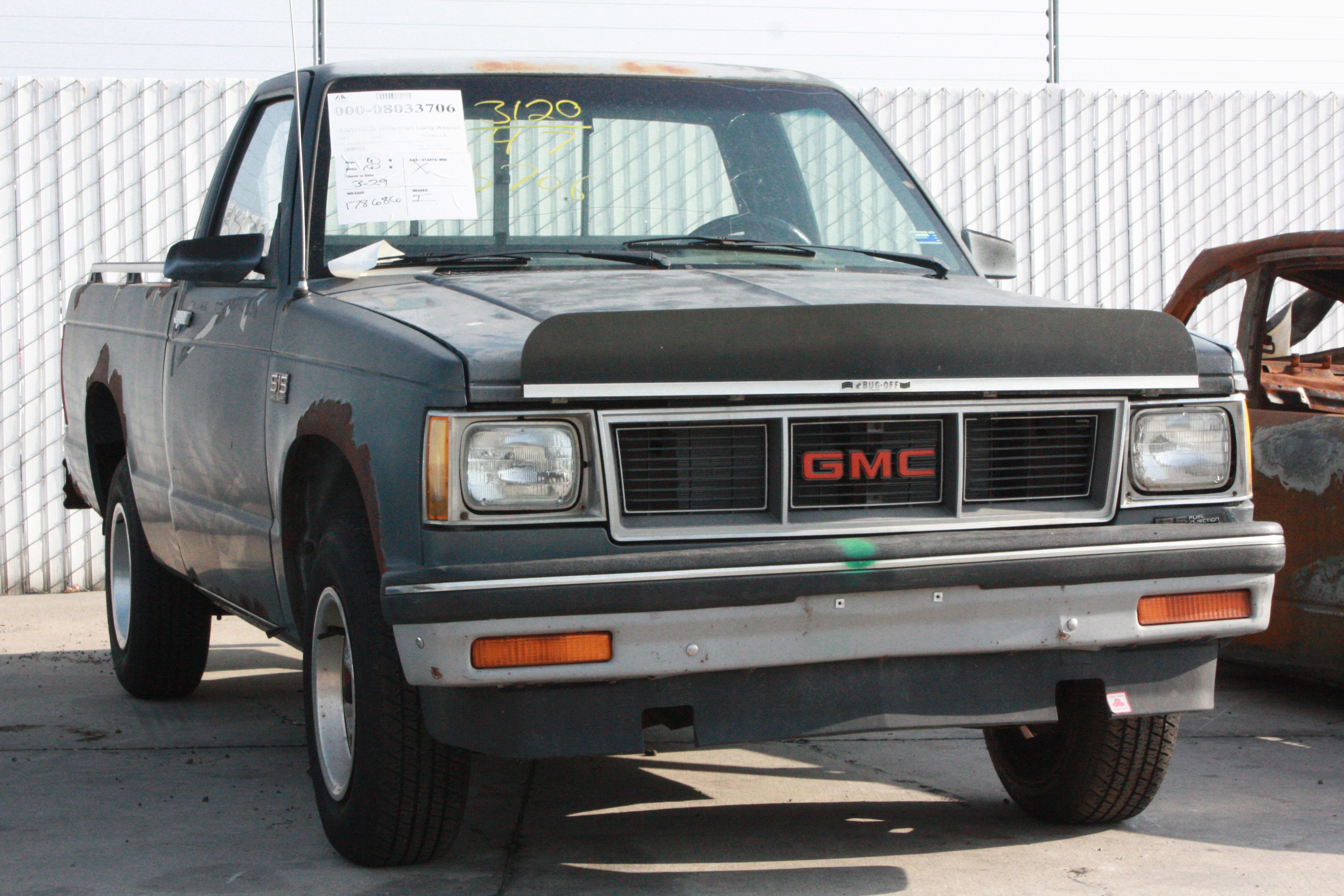
1987–1990 GMC S-15 single cab

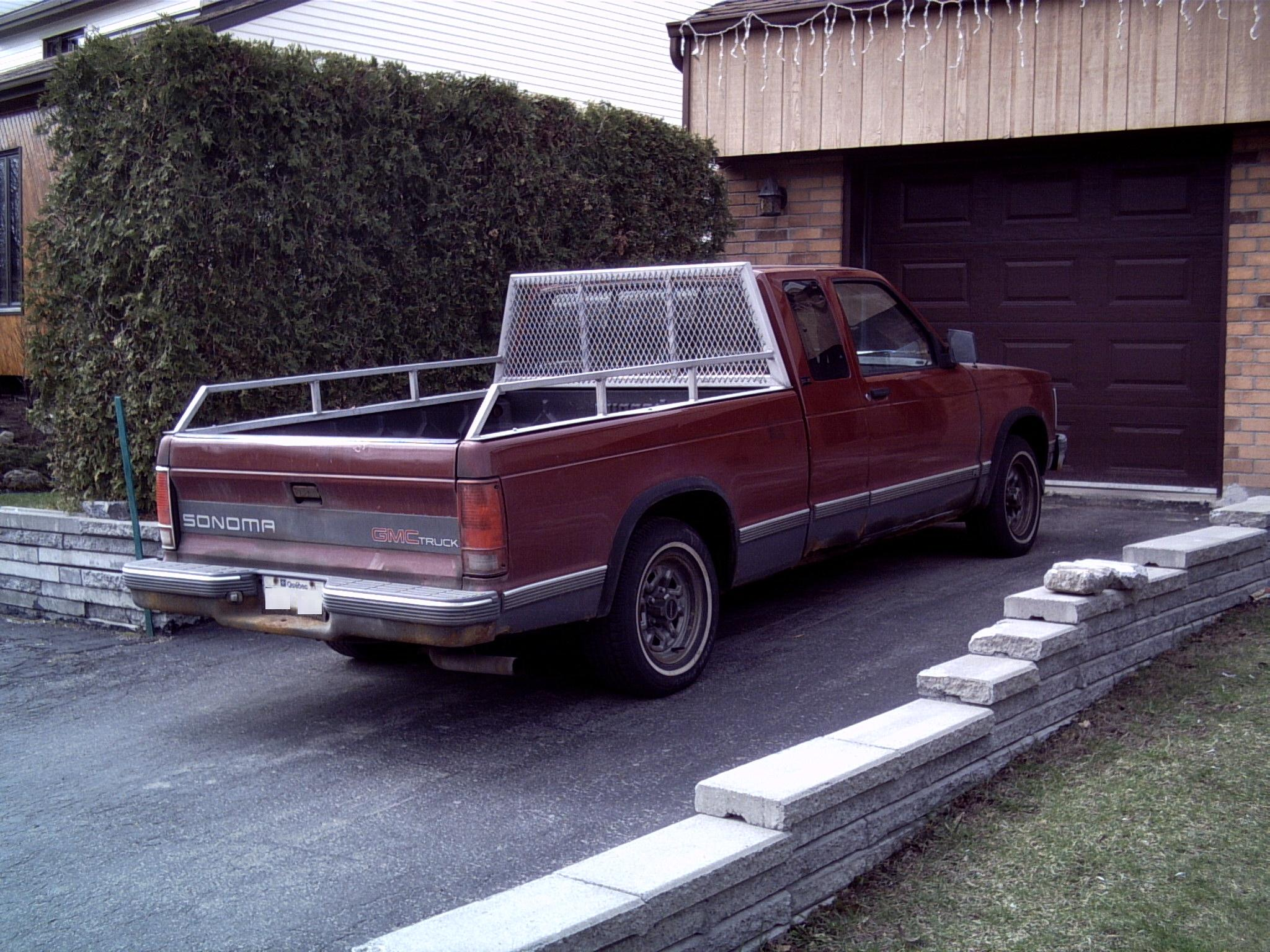
1st generation GMC S-15/Sonoma, rear view

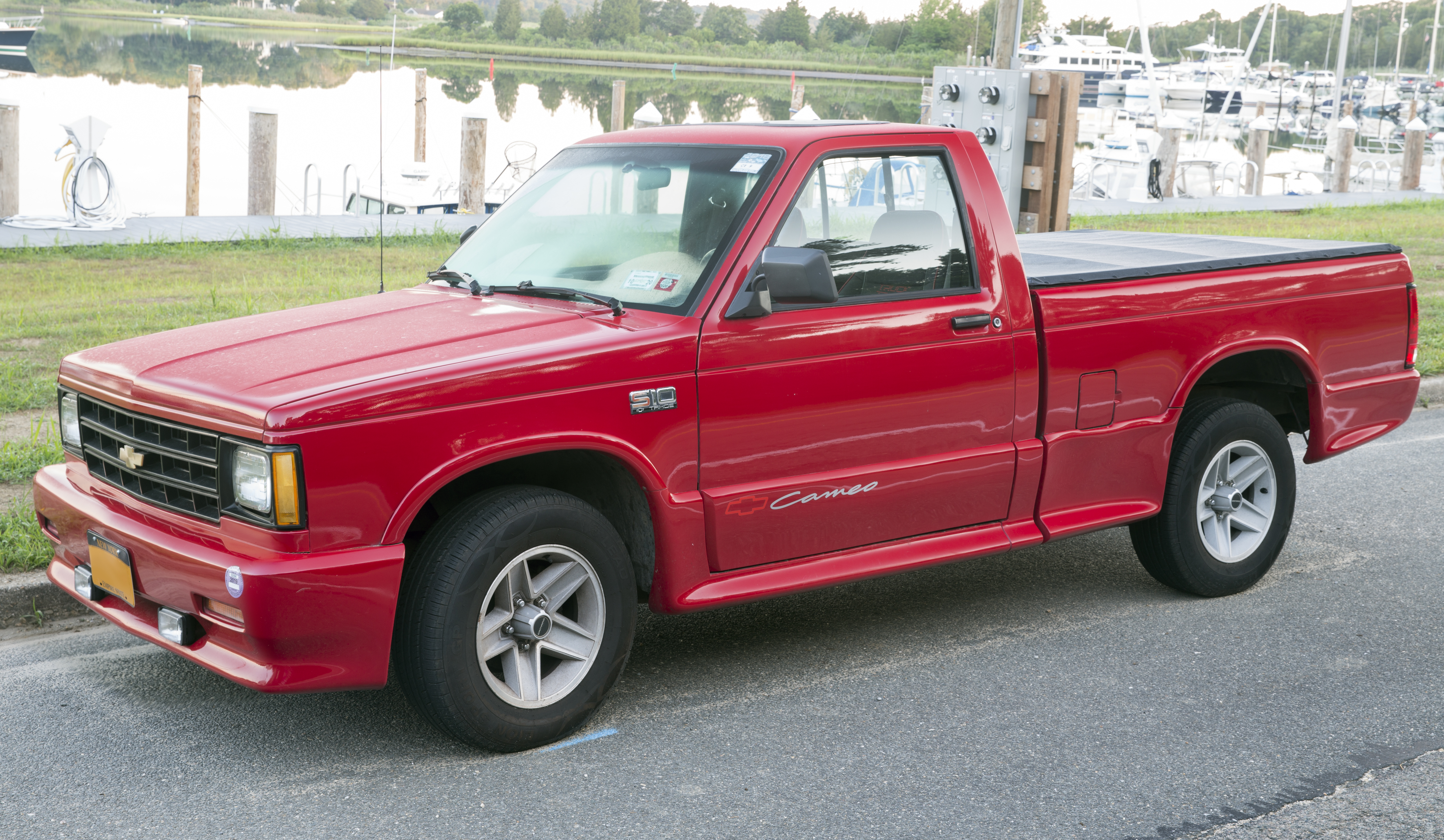
1990 Chevrolet S-10 Cameo in Apple Red

=== Engines ===
Years	Engine	Power	Torque
1982–1985	1.9 L LR1 Isuzu I4, 2-barrel	82 hp (61 kW; 83 PS) at 4600 rpm	101 lb⋅ft (137 N⋅m) at 3000 rpm
1983–1984	2.0 L LQ2 GM 122 I4, 2-barrel	83 hp (62 kW; 84 PS) at 4600 rpm	108 lb⋅ft (146 N⋅m) at 2400 rpm
1984–1985	2.2 L LQ7 Isuzu Diesel I4	62 hp (46 kW; 63 PS) at 4300 rpm	96 lb⋅ft (130 N⋅m) at 2200 rpm
1985–1986	2.5 L LN8 Iron Duke I4, TBI	92 hp (69 kW; 93 PS) at 4400 rpm	134 lb⋅ft (182 N⋅m) at 2800 rpm
1987–1989	2.5 L LN8 Iron Duke I4, TBI	92 hp (69 kW; 93 PS) at 4400 rpm	130 lb⋅ft (176 N⋅m) at 3200 rpm
1990	2.5 L LN8 Iron Duke I4, TBI	94 hp (70 kW; 95 PS) at 4400 rpm	130 lb⋅ft (176 N⋅m) at 3200 rpm
1991–1993	2.5 L L38 Iron Duke I4, TBI	105 hp (78 kW; 106 PS) at 4800 rpm	135 lb⋅ft (183 N⋅m) at 3200 rpm
1982	2.8 L LR2 60° V6, 2-barrel	110 hp (82 kW; 112 PS) at 4800 rpm	148 lb⋅ft (201 N⋅m) at 2000 rpm
1983–1984	2.8 L LR2 60° V6, 2-barrel	110 hp (82 kW; 112 PS) at 4800 rpm	145 lb⋅ft (197 N⋅m) at 2100 rpm
1985	2.8 L LR2 60° V6, 2-barrel	115 hp (86 kW; 117 PS) at 4800 rpm	150 lb⋅ft (203 N⋅m) at 2100 rpm
1986	2.8 L LL2 60° V6, TBI	125 hp (93 kW; 127 PS) at 4800 rpm	150 lb⋅ft (203 N⋅m) at 2200 rpm
1987–1993	2.8 L LL2 60° V6, TBI	125 hp (93 kW; 127 PS) at 4800 rpm	150 lb⋅ft (203 N⋅m) at 2400 rpm
1988–1992	4.3 L LB4 90° V6, TBI	160 hp (119 kW; 162 PS) at 4000 rpm	230 lb⋅ft (312 N⋅m) at 2800 rpm
1993	4.3 L LB4 90° V6, TBI	165 hp (123 kW; 167 PS) at 4000 rpm	235 lb⋅ft (319 N⋅m) at 2400 rpm
1992–1993	4.3 L L35 90° V6, CPI	195 hp (145 kW; 198 PS) at 4500 rpm	260 lb⋅ft (353 N⋅m) at 3600 rpm

== Second generation (1994) ==
Second generation
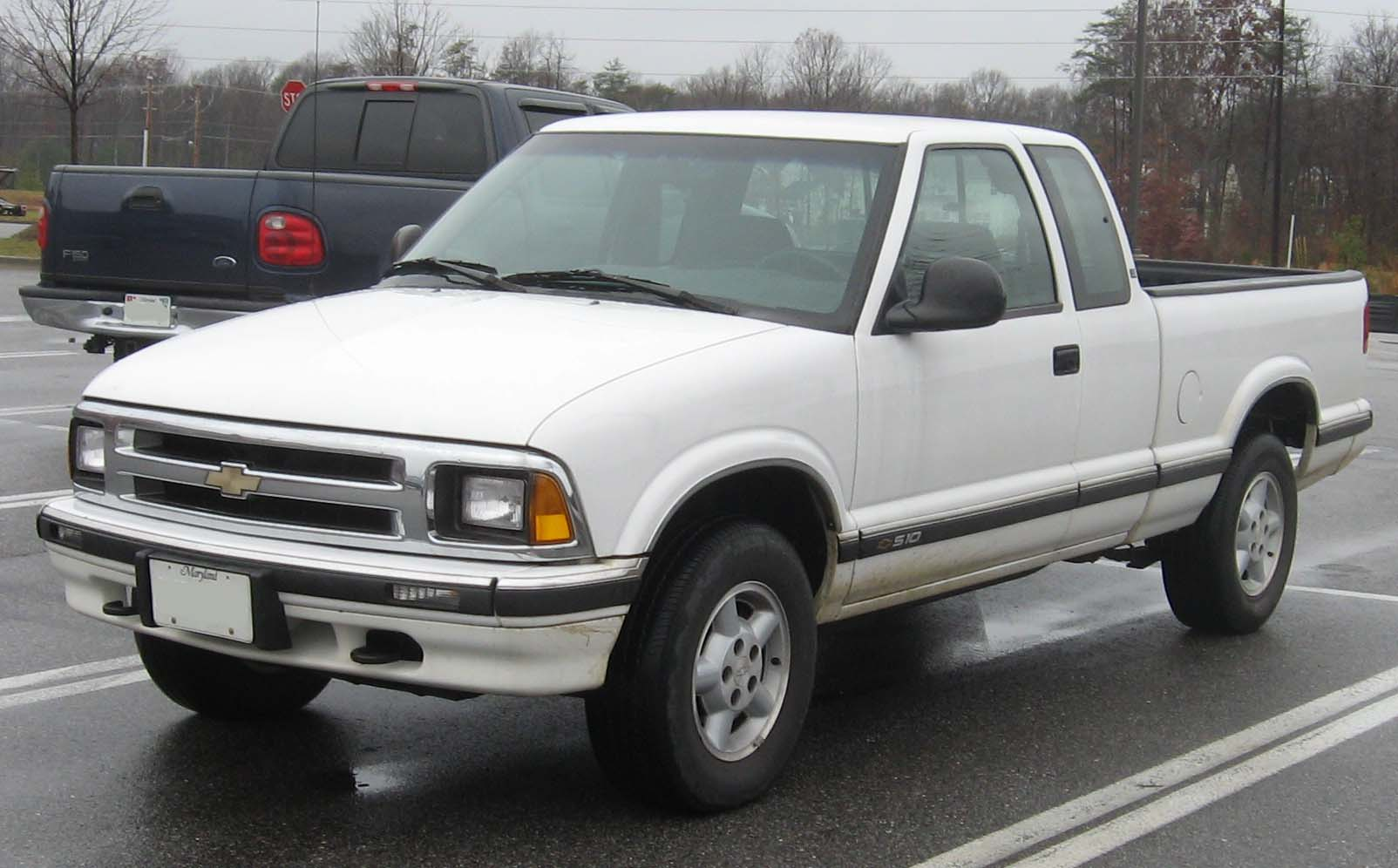
- 1994-1997 Chevrolet S-10

Overview
- Also called: GMC Sonoma; Isuzu Hombre
- Production: 1993–2004 (North America); 1995–2012 (Brazil); 1996–2000 (Isuzu Hombre)
- Model years: 1994–2004 (S-10/Sonoma); 1996–2000 (Isuzu Hombre)
- Assembly: United States: Shreveport, Louisiana (Shreveport Operations); Linden, New Jersey (Linden Assembly); Brazil: São José dos Campos (GM Brazil); China: Shenyang (Jinbei GM)
- Designer: Jack Finegan (Brazilian version)

Body and chassis
- Platform: GMT325
- Related: Chevrolet S-10 EV; Chevrolet Blazer / GMC Jimmy / Opel Blazer; Oldsmobile Bravada

Powertrain
- Engine: 2.2 L LN2/L43 I4; 4.3 L LB4/L35/LF6/LU3 V6
- Transmission: 4-speed 4L60-E automatic 5-speed BorgWarner T-5 manual (1994–95 I4); 5-speed NV1500 manual (1996+ I4); 5-speed NV3500 manual (V6)

Dimensions
- Wheelbase: 108.3 in (2,751 mm) (reg. cab short bed); 117.9 in (2,995 mm) (reg. cab long bed); 122.9 in (3,122 mm) (ext. cab short bed)
- Length: 190 in (4,826 mm) (short bed); 203 in (5,156 mm) (ext. cab); 205 in (5,207 mm) (long bed)
- Width: 67.9 in (1,725 mm)
- Height: 63.5 in (1,613 mm)

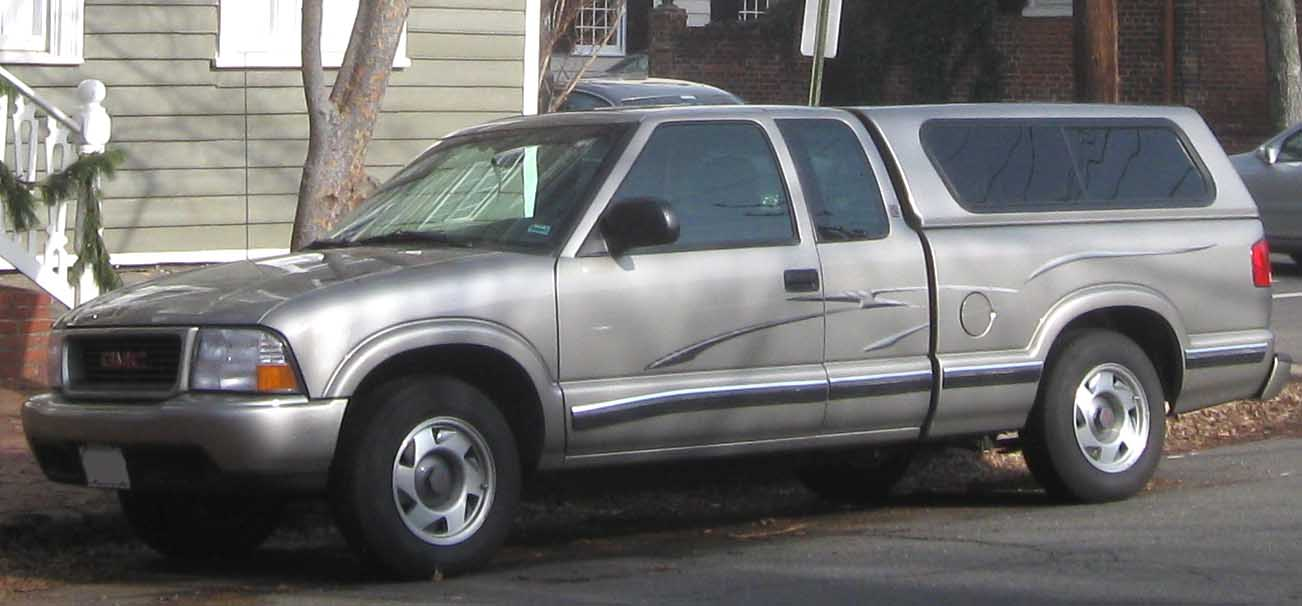
1998–2003 GMC Sonoma

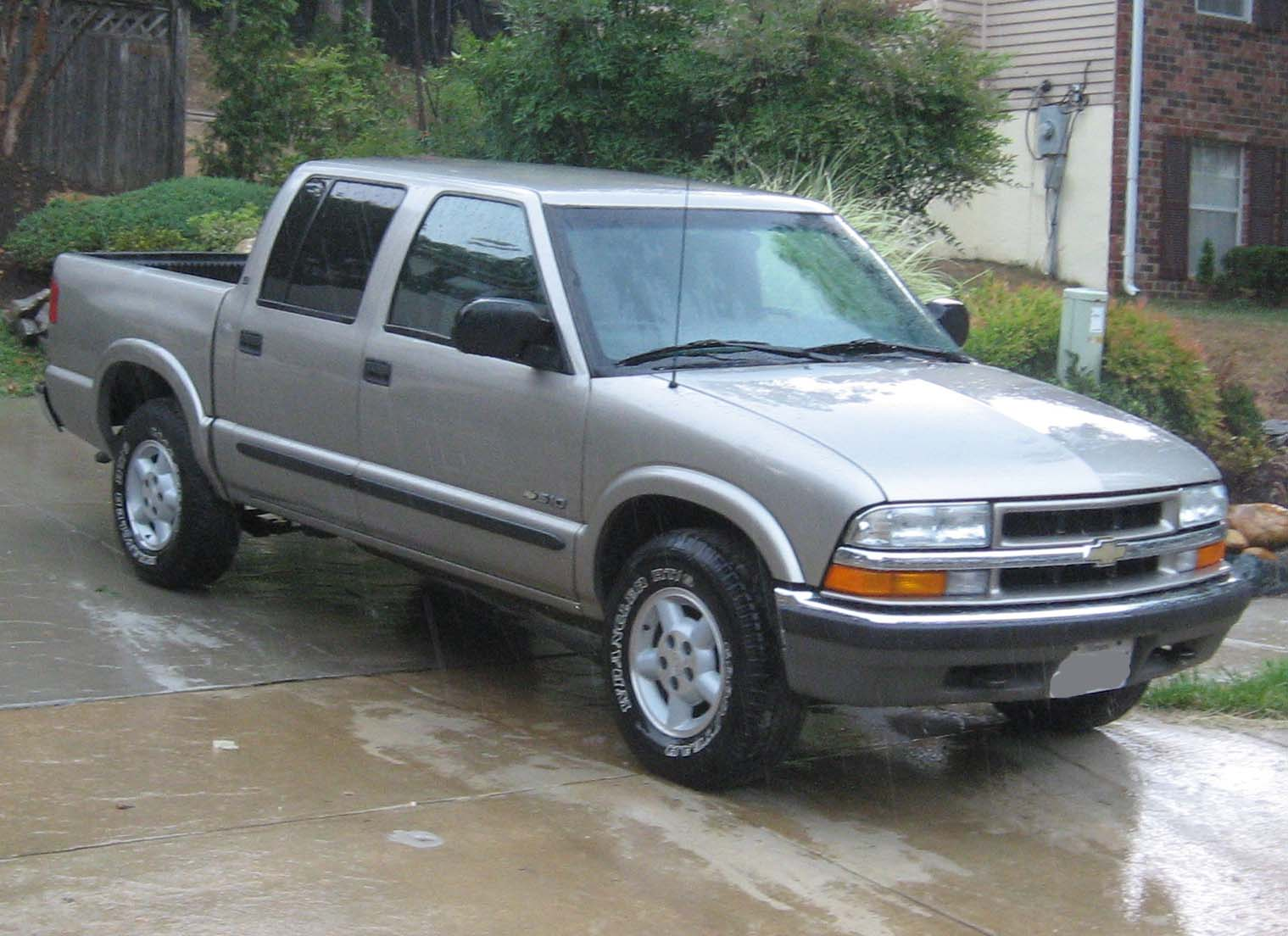
2001–2004 Chevrolet S-10 crew cab (facelift)

The second-generation trucks arrived for the 1994 model year. All of the special models (the Syclone, Typhoon, and Sonoma GT) were discontinued, but the changes to the pickup brought it in line with its major competitor, the Ford Ranger. The Iron Duke 4-cylinder and 2.8 L 60° V6 engines were discontinued, the 4.3 L Vortec V6 was enhanced, and a new 2.2 L 4-cylinder engine (which had been introduced in 1990 on various front-wheel-drive GM compact and mid-size platforms) became the engines of choice to power the second generation of S-10s. In compliance with the Clean Air Act, all second-generation S-10s and Sonomas equipped with air conditioning used CFC-free R134a refrigerant beginning with the 1994 model year. The all-new 1994 S-10 did not offer any airbag, presumably as a temporary measure to economize the introduction of the new body styles, as well as to gradually phase out steering wheel designs that did not accommodate for airbags, though the vehicle itself was slated for airbag capability.

Many of the chassis components were the same as the first generation (the control arms between the first and second generation were the same, originally sourced from GM's G-body platform), along with the steering knuckle, leaf springs, and differential assembly but suspension and axles were greatly enhanced. Lower control arms for the two-wheel drive model had 1/4-inch thicker steering stops; the second-generation control arms are commonly used as an upgrade for the first generation. SUV models (Blazer, Jimmy, Bravada) came with thicker front and rear sway bars.

Generally, for the two-wheel-drive trucks, the 8.5-inch rear end was only used when it came with both a manual transmission and the L35 W-code 4.3 L (262 cu in) V6 engine; it was an option for four-wheel-drive trucks with either transmission. This was also the year that GM introduced the ZR2 off-road package.

For 1995, a driver's-side airbag was added as well as daytime running lights. In 1996, the 4.3 L engine was refreshed, and a third (rear) door was added for extended cab models, along with the Sportside bed option. In 1998, the exterior, interior, brakes, and 2.2 L I4 engine were refreshed, along with a "next-generation" supplemental restraint system that added a passenger-side air bag. The SS package was replaced by the "Xtreme" package. In 2001, a crew cab option was added and was only available with four-wheel drive and an automatic transmission. For the 2004 model year, the regular and extended cab models were discontinued; only the crew cab model was retained. Production ended in January 2004.

Base two-wheel-drive models came with 15×6.5" wheels with directional vents, and Xtreme and ZQ8 models came with 16×8" wheels, while four-wheel-drive models (including the ZR2) used 15×7" wheels. The 14-inch (360 mm) wheels used on the first generation were discontinued.

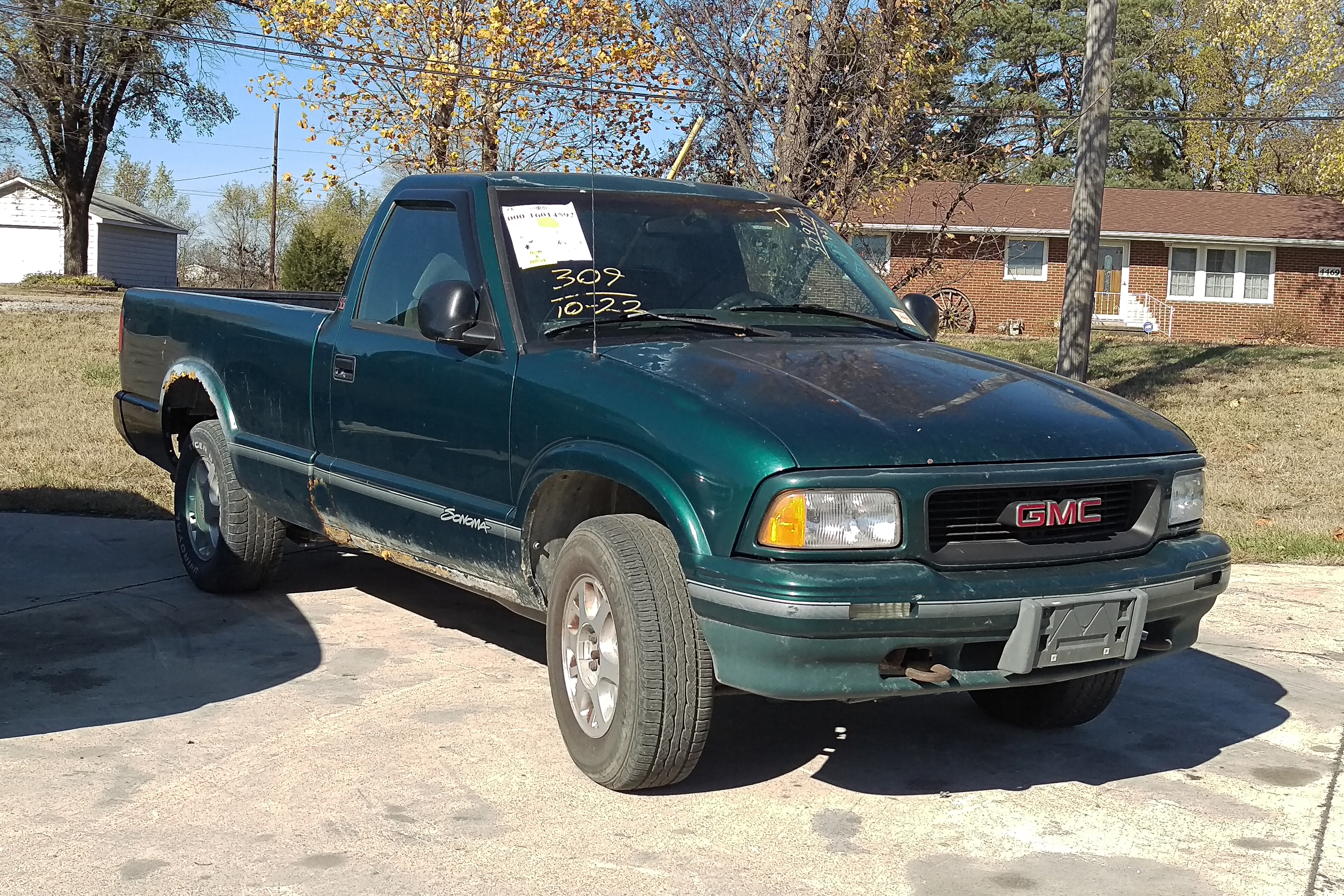
1994–1997 GMC Sonoma regular cab

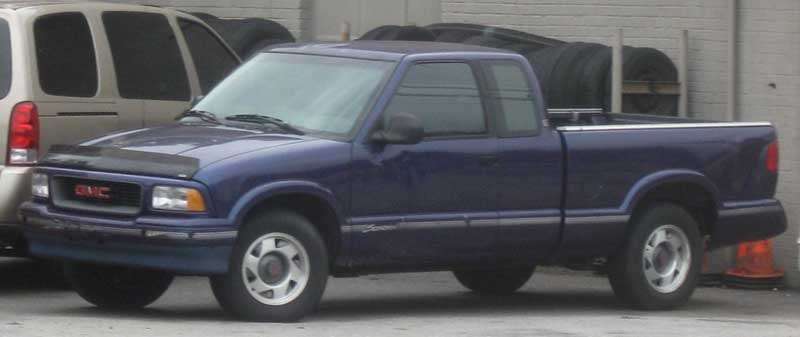
1994–1997 GMC Sonoma extended cab

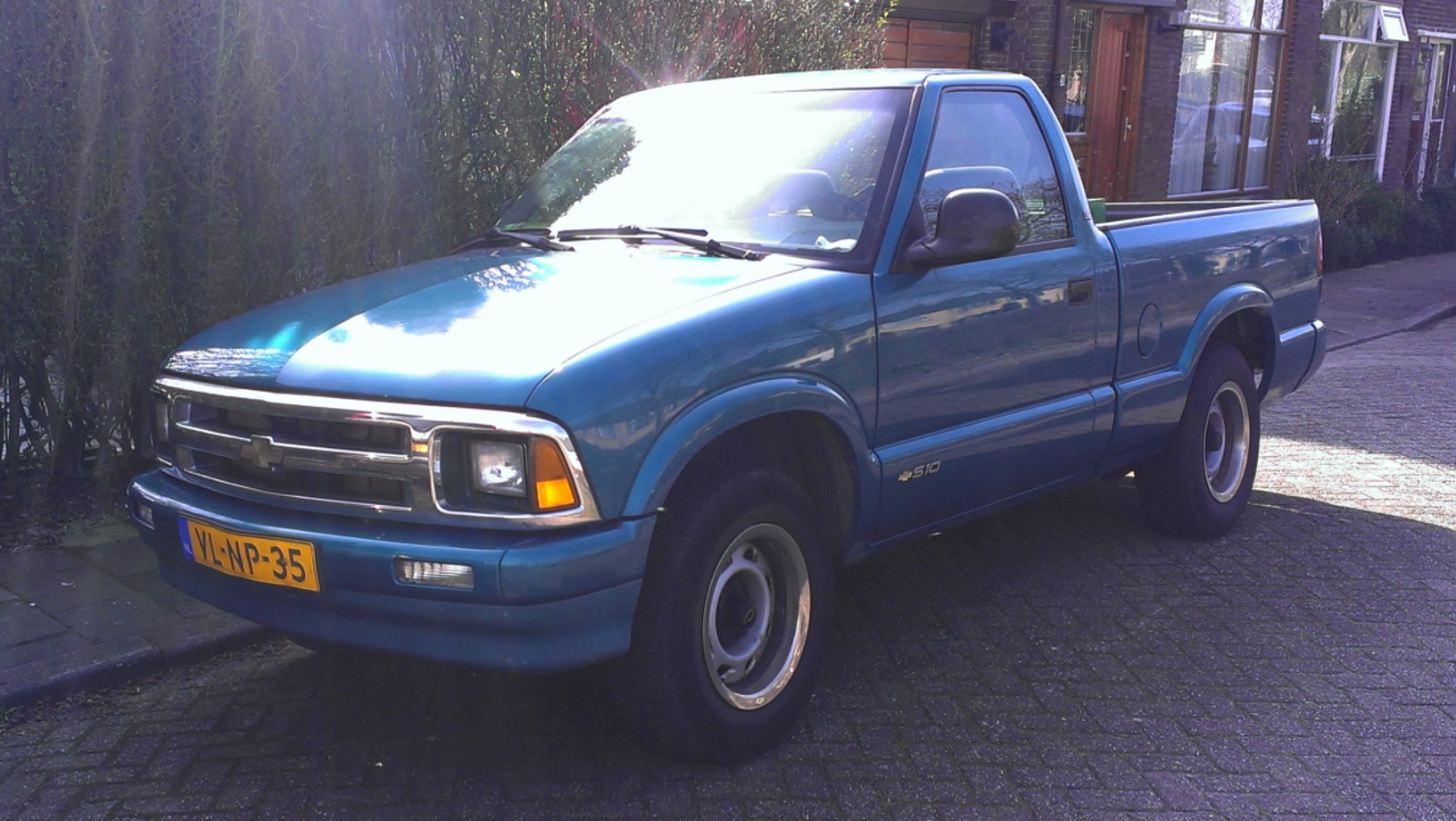
1996 Chevrolet S-10 (European version)

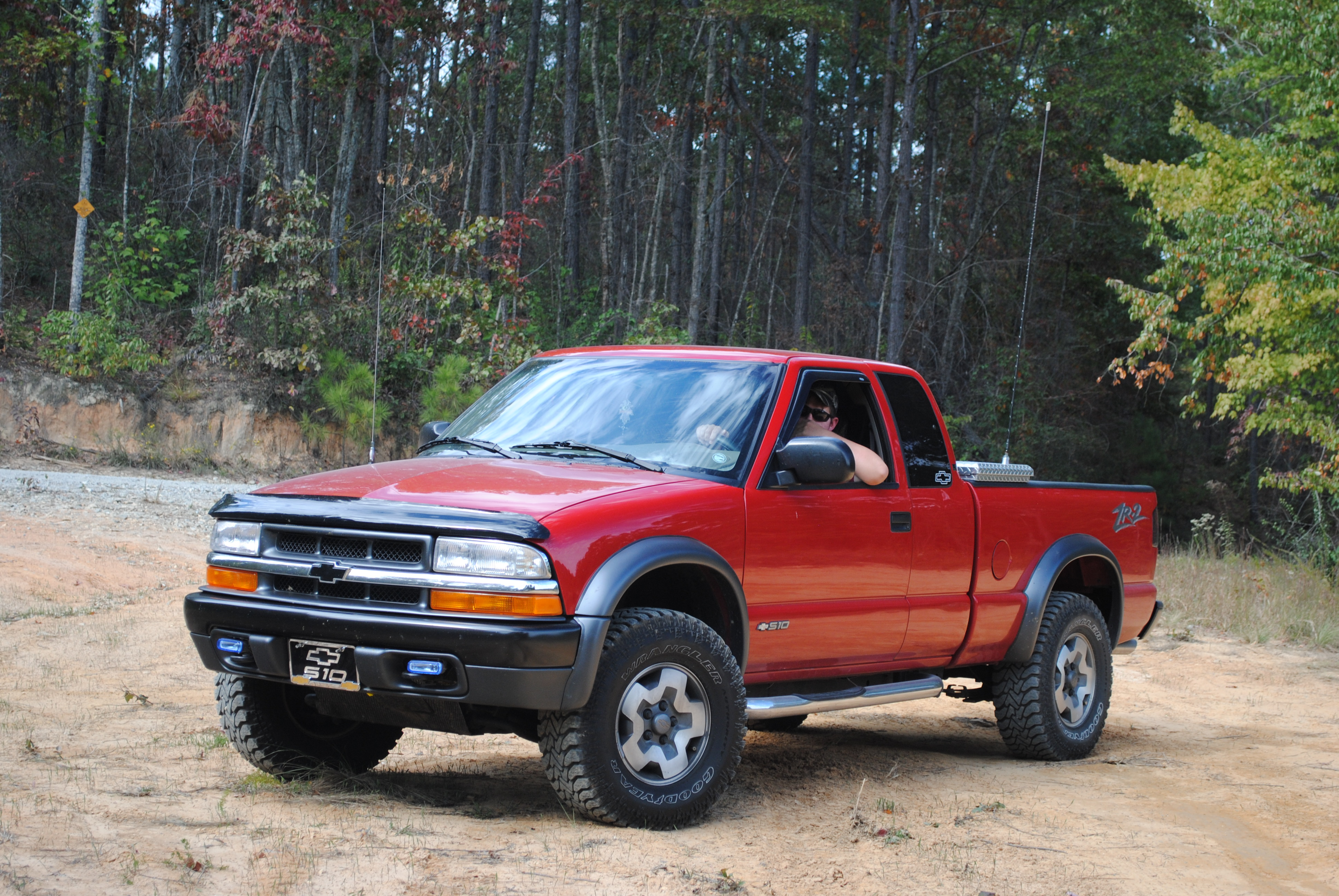
2001 Chevrolet S-10 ZR2

=== Electric versions ===
Solectria Corporation offered the E-10, which was an electric vehicle conversion of the S-10 starting in 1993. U.S. Electricar also offered S-10 conversions starting in 1994. In 1997, General Motors introduced the Chevrolet S-10 EV, a battery-electric version of the S-10 pickup. The S-10 EV used the same front-wheel-drive powertrain as the GM EV1.

=== 1998 restyling ===
For 1998, the Chevrolet S-10, GMC Sonoma, and Isuzu Hombre received a mid-cycle refresh. On the exterior, the front fascia was redesigned, and new wheel designs were added. The interior received a full redesign, with "TheftLock" anti-theft functionality for most radios, improved audio systems (including newly designed radios), new interior front door panels, an optional combination cassette and CD player radio, redesigned keyless entry remotes, a new steering wheel, dual airbags, a new instrument cluster with digital odometer and gear shift indicator for automatic transmission-equipped models, and new seat fabrics.

=== Crew Cab (2001–2004) ===
For the 2001 model year, a four-door Crew Cab configuration was introduced for the Chevrolet S-10 and GMC Sonoma (just three years before the full-size Silverado 1500 added it). Available exclusively in LS or SLS trims, the Crew Cab included many features that were optional on other S-10 models, such as four-wheel drive, full power accessories (windows, door locks, exterior side mirrors, and keyless entry), dual front bucket seats, fifteen-inch five-spoke aluminum-alloy wheels, an AM/FM stereo radio with TheftLock capabilities, a single-disc CD player, and Automatic Tone Control (ATC), a six-speaker audio system, a tachometer for the instrument cluster, and air conditioning. Leather-trimmed seating surfaces were also introduced for the Crew Cab for the first time.

==== ZR-5 Sport Package ====
Available exclusively on the Chevrolet S-10 and GMC Sonoma LS and SLS Crew Cab models, the ZR-5 Sport Package was a sport appearance package that added black front and rear bumpers, fifteen-inch (15") machined aluminum-alloy wheels, "ZR-5" pickup side box decals to the standard S-10 and Sonoma LS and SLS Crew Cab models.

=== SS ===
The Chevrolet S-10 SS was a high-performance version of the S-10, introduced in 1994. Fewer than 3,000 SS units were produced yearly on average. When introduced, the SS was only sold in three colors: Onyx Black, Summit White, and Apple Red. The SS was discontinued in 1998 and was replaced by the S-10 Xtreme for the 1999 model year.

A 4.3 L V6 (which was optional on regular S-10s) was the standard engine used in the SS, producing between 180 and 200 hp (149 kW). The SS included a limited-slip differential, lowered suspension (starting with the 1996 model year), cosmetic changes such as a different grille, body-colored bumpers, 16-inch wheels (available from 1996 to 1998, similar in design to the 1991 and 1992 Camaro Z28 with Chevrolet "bowtie" logo center caps), and other minor cosmetic differences. All SS versions were regular cabs, while Xtremes were available with the "third door" extended cab. A Stepside bed version was available from 1996 to 1998 and until 2003 on the Xtreme.

=== ZR2 ===
The ZR2 package was an off-road package available for the second generation S-10. The ZR2 package included a 4-inch (100 mm) wider track width, a boxed ladder-type frame with modified suspension mounting points, larger wheel and axle bearings, 31-inch all-terrain tires, a suspension lift (approximately three inches more ground clearance versus a regular four-wheel drive S-10), upgraded Bilstein suspension, fender flares, alloy wheels, and an 8.5-inch Chevrolet 10-bolt rear differential with 3.73:1 gears and an Eaton MLocker (coded as G80).

=== Isuzu Hombre ===
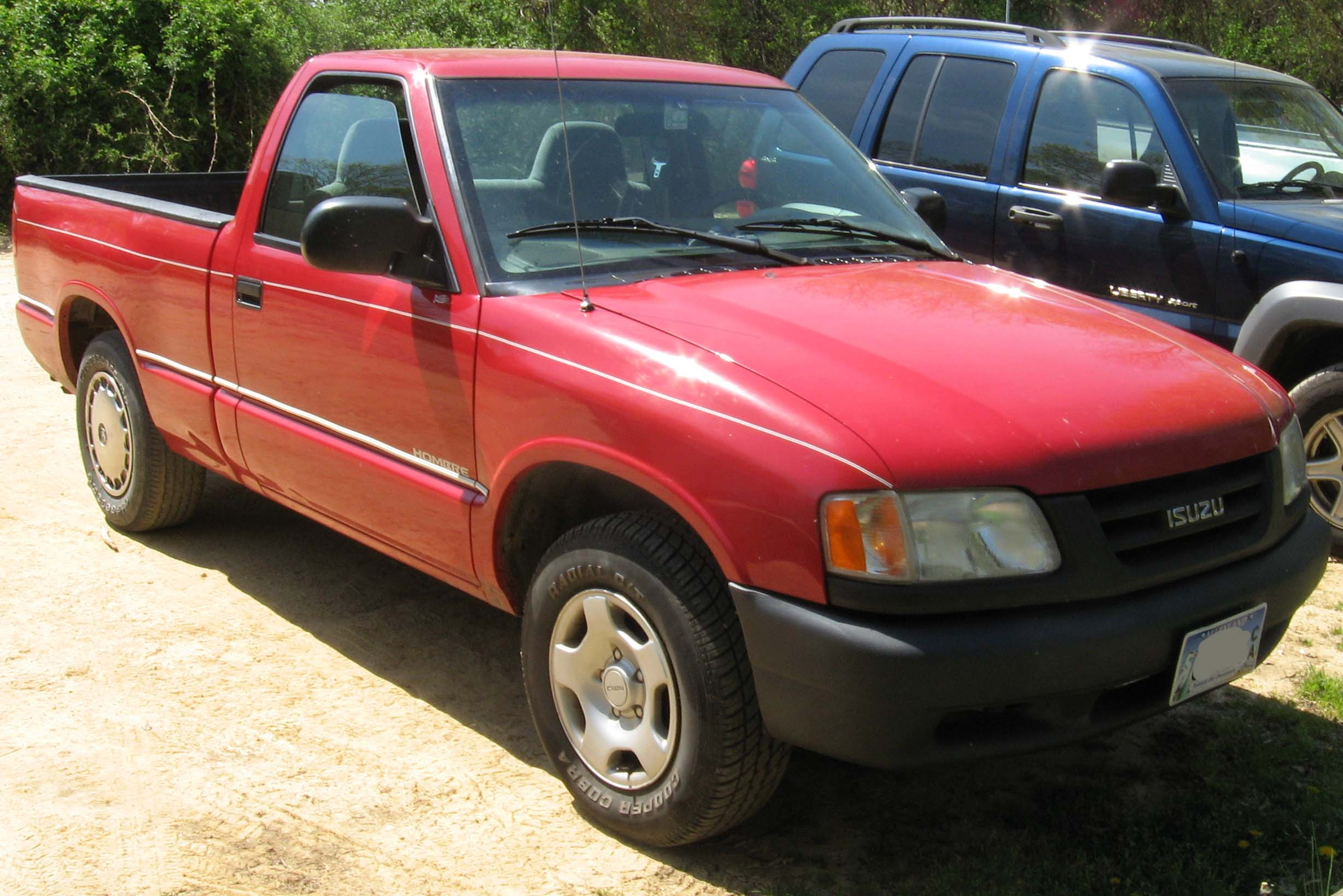
1996–1997 Isuzu Hombre single cab

In 1996, Isuzu replaced its P'up with a version of the Louisiana-built Chevrolet S-10, the Isuzu Hombre, based on the Brazilian-market S-10 (the front grille and fenders are based on the Brazilian S-10 along with the truck bed sheetmetal). The Hombre differed from its GM siblings mostly in the front sheetmetal, with different lights, grille, front bumper, and front fenders, which were more flared out. The rear quarter panels were also different, as they had a slight flare over the wheel well to match the front fenders. The Hombre had a much smaller range of equipment options compared to the S-10 and Sonoma; a Spacecab extended cab, V6 engine, and four-wheel drive were added for 1997 and available until 1998.

Two trim levels were offered: the base S and the uplevel XS. The XS had features like a cassette tape deck, higher-grade interior fabric, a tachometer, sliding rear window, and a split 60/40 seatback. Hombres were equipped with the S-10's 15×7" steel wheels (with 8 directional vents); the Hombre wheels were painted black (the S-10, Sonoma, and Blazer/Jimmy wheels were painted silver) since a majority were equipped with wheel covers with the Isuzu logo. Hombres were also available with the S-10's aluminum wheels with Isuzu center caps.

Slow sales resulted in production ending in 2000. It would be another six years before Isuzu re-entered the pick-up market with the i-Series, which formed the basis for the S-10's successor, the Colorado.

=== South America and China (1994–2012) ===
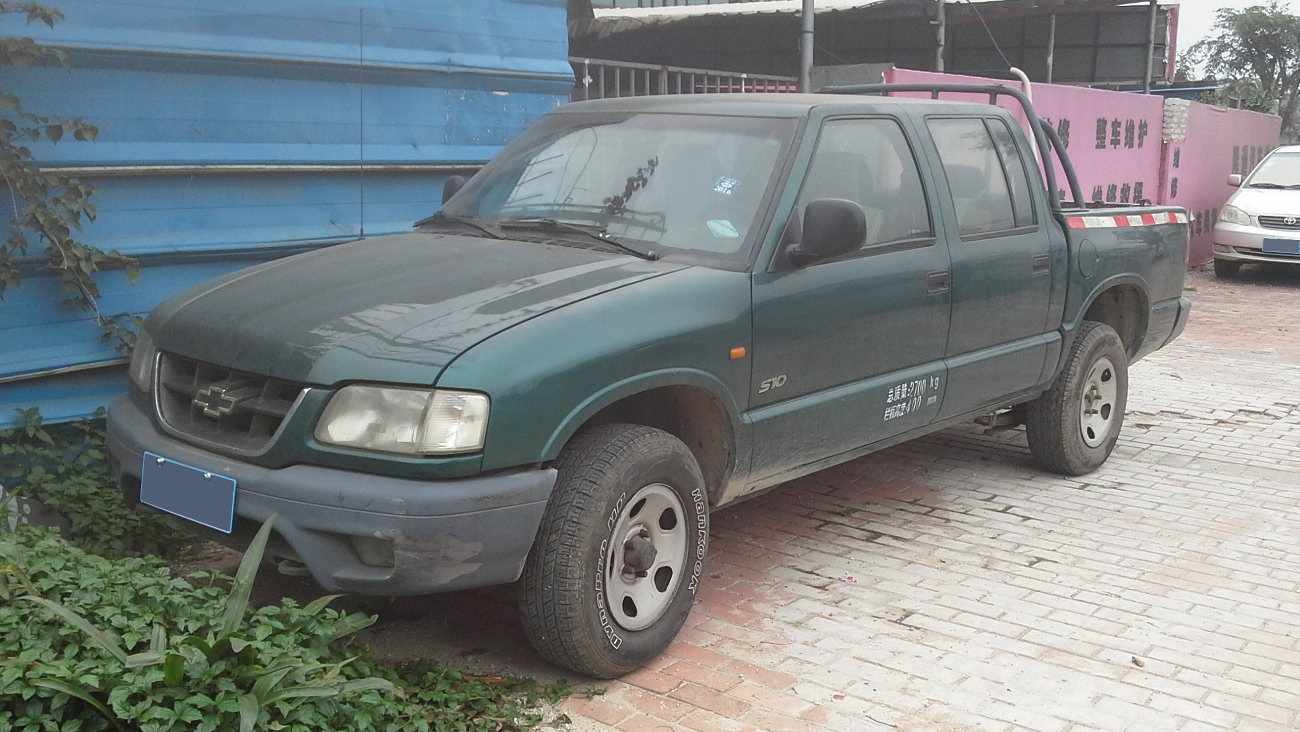
Chinese and South American version 1994–2001 (pre-facelift)

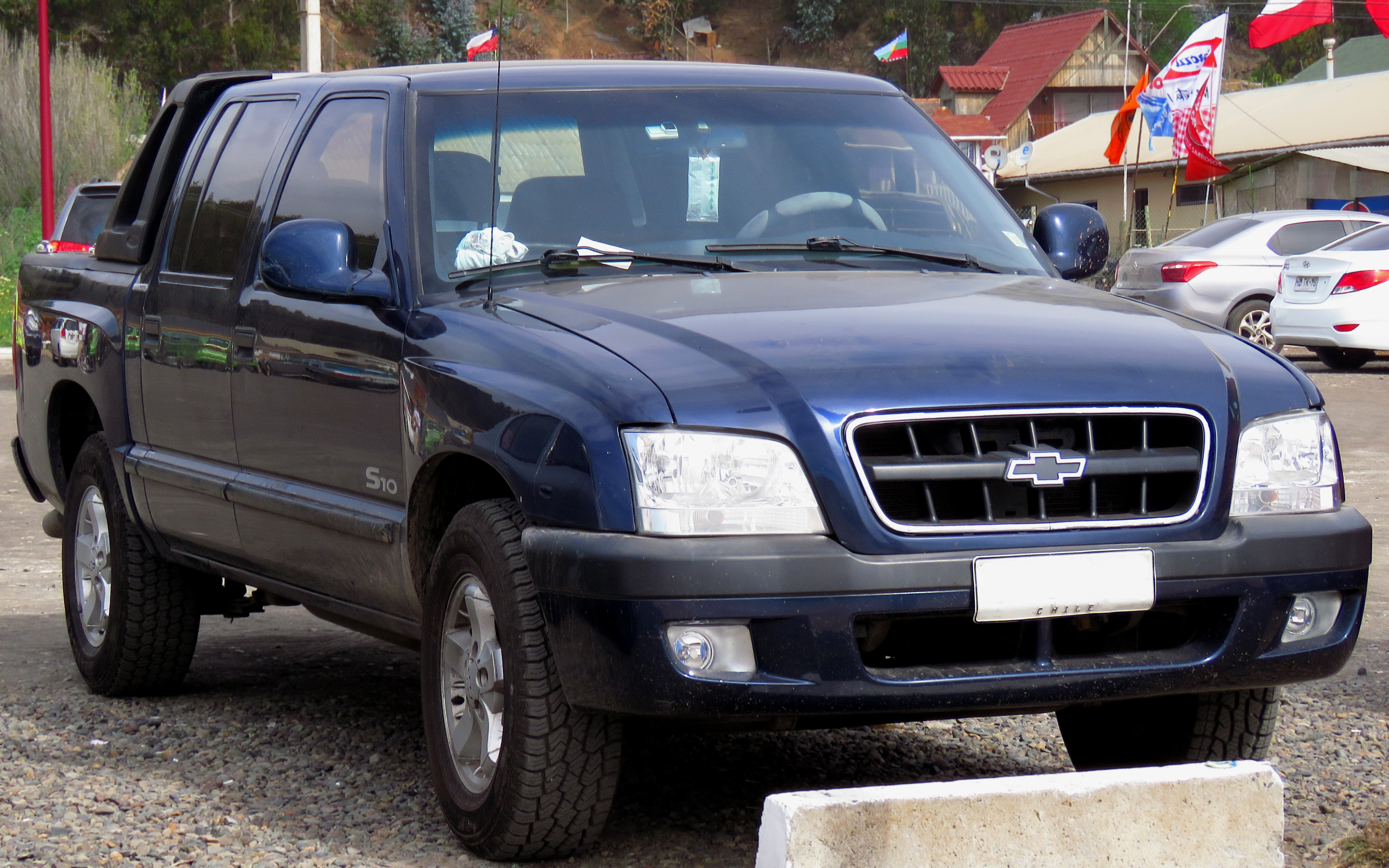
South American version (facelift)

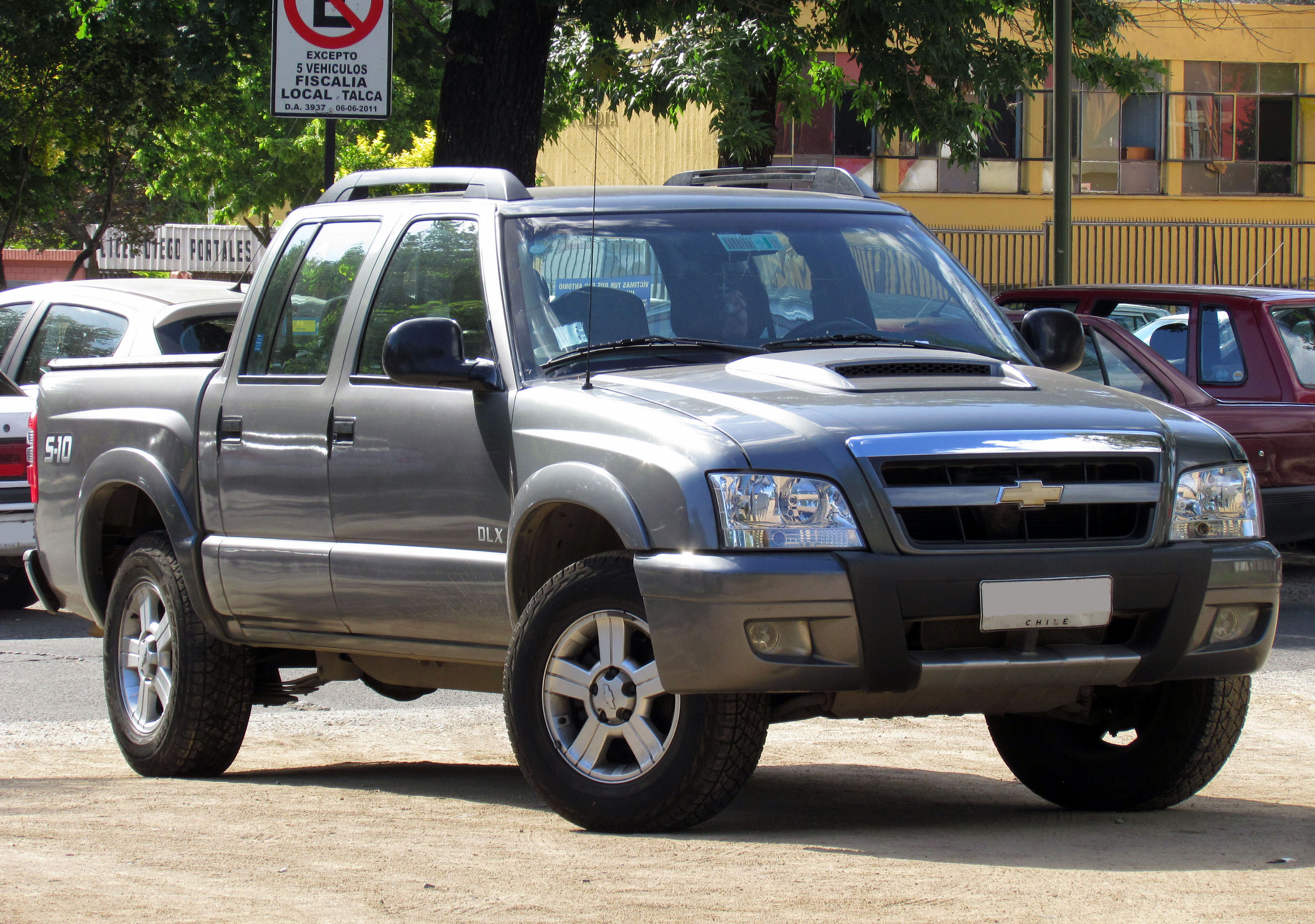
South American version (second facelift)

=== Engines ===
Years	Engine	Power	Torque	VIN letter
1994–1997	2.2 L Vortec 2200 (LN2) I4	118 hp (88 kW; 120 PS) @ 5200 RPM	130 lb⋅ft (176 N⋅m) @ 2800 RPM	4
1998–2003	2.2 L Vortec 2200 (L43) I4	120 hp (89 kW; 122 PS) @ 5000 RPM	140 lb⋅ft (190 N⋅m) @ 3600 RPM	5
1994	4.3 L 90° (LB4) V-6, TBI	165 hp (123 kW; 167 PS) @ 4000 RPM	235 lb⋅ft (319 N⋅m) @ 2400 RPM	Z
1995	4.3 L 90° (LB4) V-6, TBI	155 hp (116 kW; 157 PS) @ 4000 RPM	235 lb⋅ft (319 N⋅m) @ 2400 RPM	Z
1994	4.3 L Vortec 4300 (L35) V-6, SCPI	195 hp (145 kW; 198 PS) @ 4500 RPM	260 lb⋅ft (353 N⋅m) @ 3600 rpm	W
1995	4.3 L Vortec 4300 (L35) V-6, SCPI	190 hp (142 kW; 193 PS) @ 4500 RPM	260 lb⋅ft (353 N⋅m) @ 3400 rpm	W
1996–2003 w/ 2WD	4.3 L Vortec 4300 (L35) V-6, SCPI	180 hp (134 kW; 182 PS) @ 4400 RPM	245 lb⋅ft (332 N⋅m) @ 2800 RPM	W
1996–2003 w/ 4WD suspension	4.3 L Vortec 4300 (L35) V-6, SCPI	190 hp (142 kW; 193 PS) @ 4400 RPM	250 lb⋅ft (339 N⋅m) @ 2800 RPM	W
2004 (Crew Cab 4WD only)	4.3 L Vortec 4300 (L35) V-6, SCPI	180 hp (134 kW; 182 PS) @ 4400 RPM	245 lb⋅ft (332 N⋅m) @ 2800 RPM	W
1996–1999 w/ 2WD	4.3 L Vortec 4300 (LF6) V-6, MPFI	175 hp (130 kW; 177 PS) @ 4400 RPM	240 lb⋅ft (325 N⋅m) @ 2800 RPM	X
1996–1999 w/ 4WD	4.3 L Vortec 4300 (LF6) V-6, MPFI	180 hp (134 kW; 182 PS) @ 4400 RPM	240 lb⋅ft (325 N⋅m) @ 2800 RPM	X

== Third generation (2012) ==
Third generation
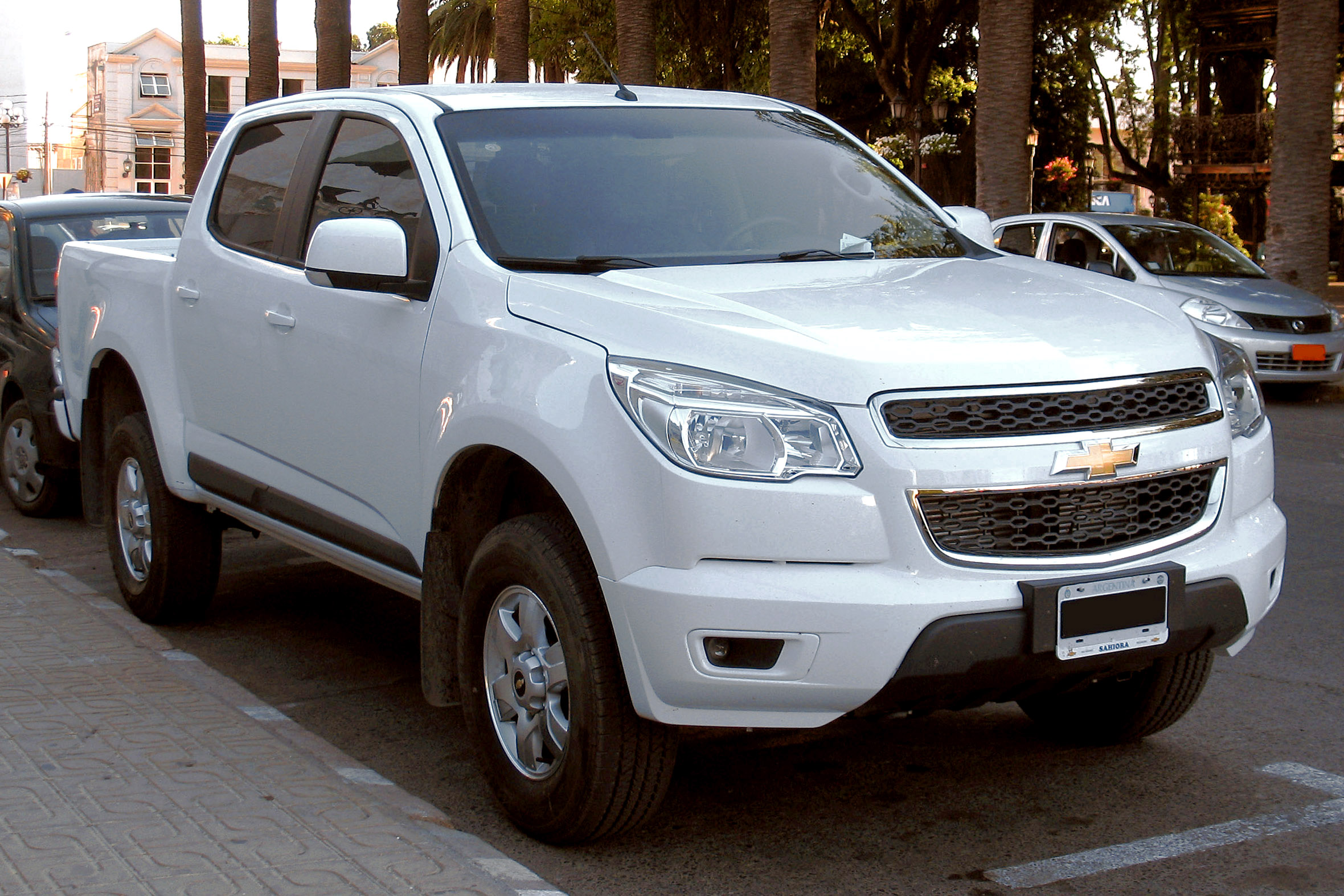

Overview
- Also called: Chevrolet Colorado; Holden Colorado (Australasia) (until 2020); HSV SportsCat (Australasia); GMC Canyon
- Production: 2012–present

Although the North American version of the S-Series was discontinued in 2004, the second generation S-10 was still being built in Brazil until 2012, when it was replaced by a Brazilian-built version of the Chevrolet Colorado called the S-10.

In Brazil, until 2014, the third generation S-10 offered a 2.4 L 147 hp Flexpower flex-fuel engine or a 2.8 L 180 hp Duramax diesel engine. For 2015 models, the diesel engine was refreshed, resulting in an increased power output of 200 hp. The flex-fuel (gasoline/ethanol) engine had an upgrade for some versions (LT and LTZ) and offered 206 hp with a 2.5 L LCV Ecotec with direct fuel injection. Also, for the first time in Brazil, Chevrolet offered the flex-fuel S-10 with four-wheel drive.

For the 2017 model, the S-10 received a facelift and the flex-fuel 2.4 L engine was dropped, with the remaining engine choices being unchanged. For 2018, the flex-fuel S-10 offers an automatic transmission, currently the market trend on these vehicles in Brazil. Since 2021, the Holden S-10 received a facelift in Warren, but as Holden was closed in Australia, the tooling was transferred to Brazil. The Brazilian S-10 was facelifted for 2023, the same model year the North American Colorado was redesigned.

A right-hand-drive version of the 2017+ facelifted model was built at the GM Thailand plant and sold in Australia and New Zealand as Holden Colorado until 2020.

In 2025, the S10, along with the Trailblazer, received yet another facelift. This time shipping with GM's new generation LWN 2.8 L 204 hp Duramax engine, superseding the XLD28 as the standard diesel option.

== S10 Max (2021) ==
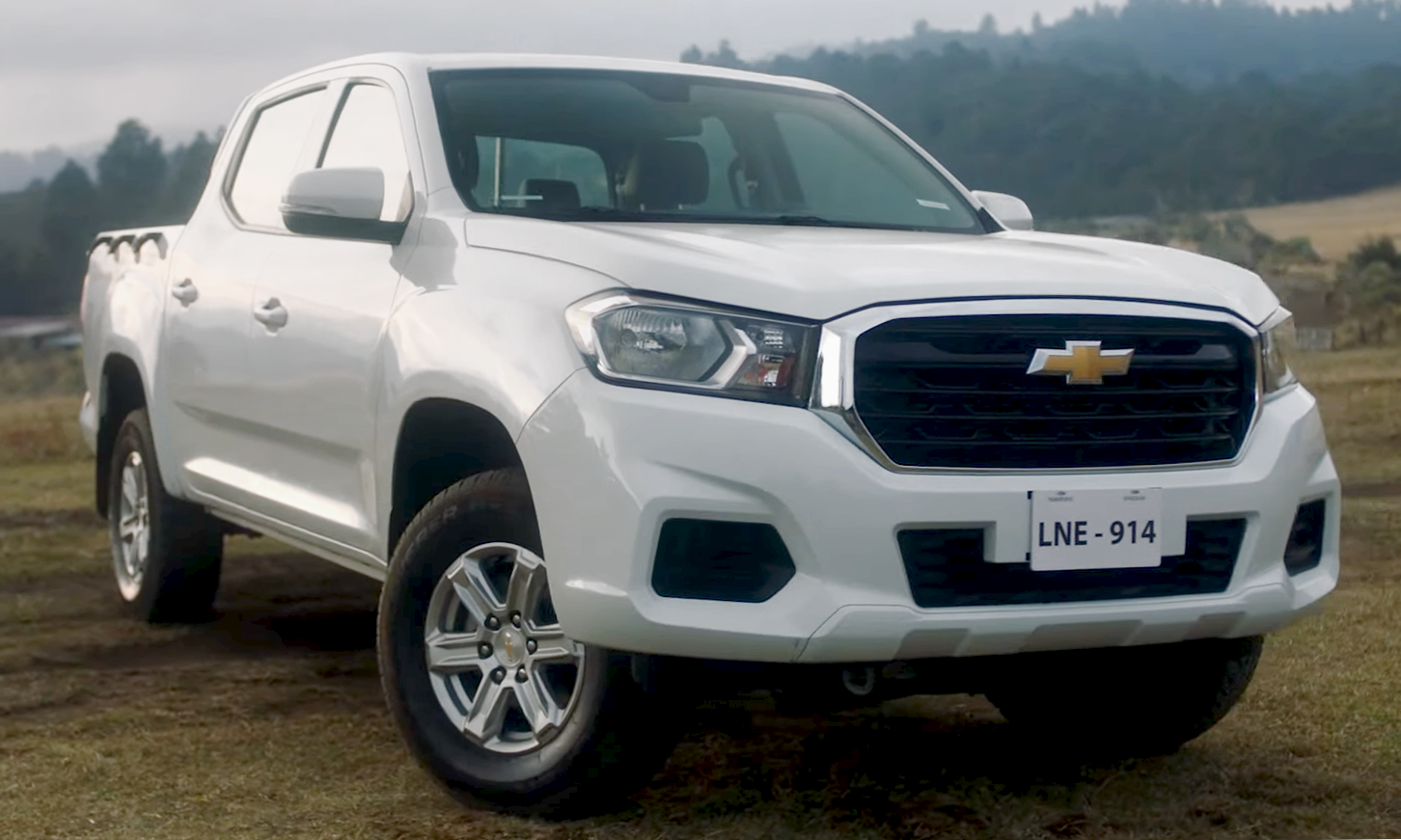
Chevrolet S10 Max (Mexico)

In late 2021, General Motors introduced the S10 Max for the Mexican market and several other Latin American countries. Imported from China and produced by SAIC, it is a rebadged Maxus T70.

== Sales ==
Year	Brazil
2001	27,511
2002	21,307
2003	14,111
2004	14,024
2005	15,007
2006	18,895
2007	22,636
2008	31,440
2009	39,346
2010	43,187
2011	42,818
2012	47,721
2013	54,255
2014	50,821
2015	33,085
2016	26,558
2017	30,449
2018	31,763
2019	32,166
2020	26,642
2021	35,058
2022	27,132
2023	25,967
2024	27,393
2025	31,458
