= Shreveport Operations =

General Motors factory in Louisiana, US (1981–2012)

Coordinates: 32°25′27″N 93°55′13″W

Shreveport Operations, officially the Shreveport Assembly and Stamping Plant, was a General Motors vehicle factory in Shreveport, Louisiana. The 3,100,000-square-foot (290,000 m^{2}) factory opened in 1981 and produced the company's compact pickup trucks alongside Moraine Assembly in Dayton, Ohio. At one point, 3,000 employees were on the payroll. Construction of the plant began in 1978, with an expansion in 2002 that included a new stamping facility.

The plant closed in August 2012 with the last truck produced being a white Chevrolet Colorado. On the front of the vehicle, a banner read "4,853,693rd". At that time, just over 800 hourly and salaried workers were employed there.

Elio Motors had announced plans to begin using the facility in 2014 to manufacture a new three-wheeled vehicle. The production date has since been moved back to 2017. Elio is working with production equipment manufacturer Comau, to sell off additional unneeded equipment at the factory.

Glovis America, a subsidiary of Hyundai Motor Group, acquired 125,000 square feet (11,600 m^{2}) of the plant for use as a distribution center of Hyundai and Kia vehicles. Glovis also leases 90 acres at this site.

== Products ==
- 1982–1990 GMC S-15
- 1982–2004 Chevrolet S-10
- 1991 GMC Syclone
- 1991–2004 GMC Sonoma
- 1996–2000 Isuzu Hombre
- 2004–2012 Chevrolet Colorado
- 2004–2012 GMC Canyon
- 2006–2010 Hummer H3
- 2006–2008 Isuzu i-Series
- 2009–2010 Hummer H3T
