= Chevrolet Colorado =

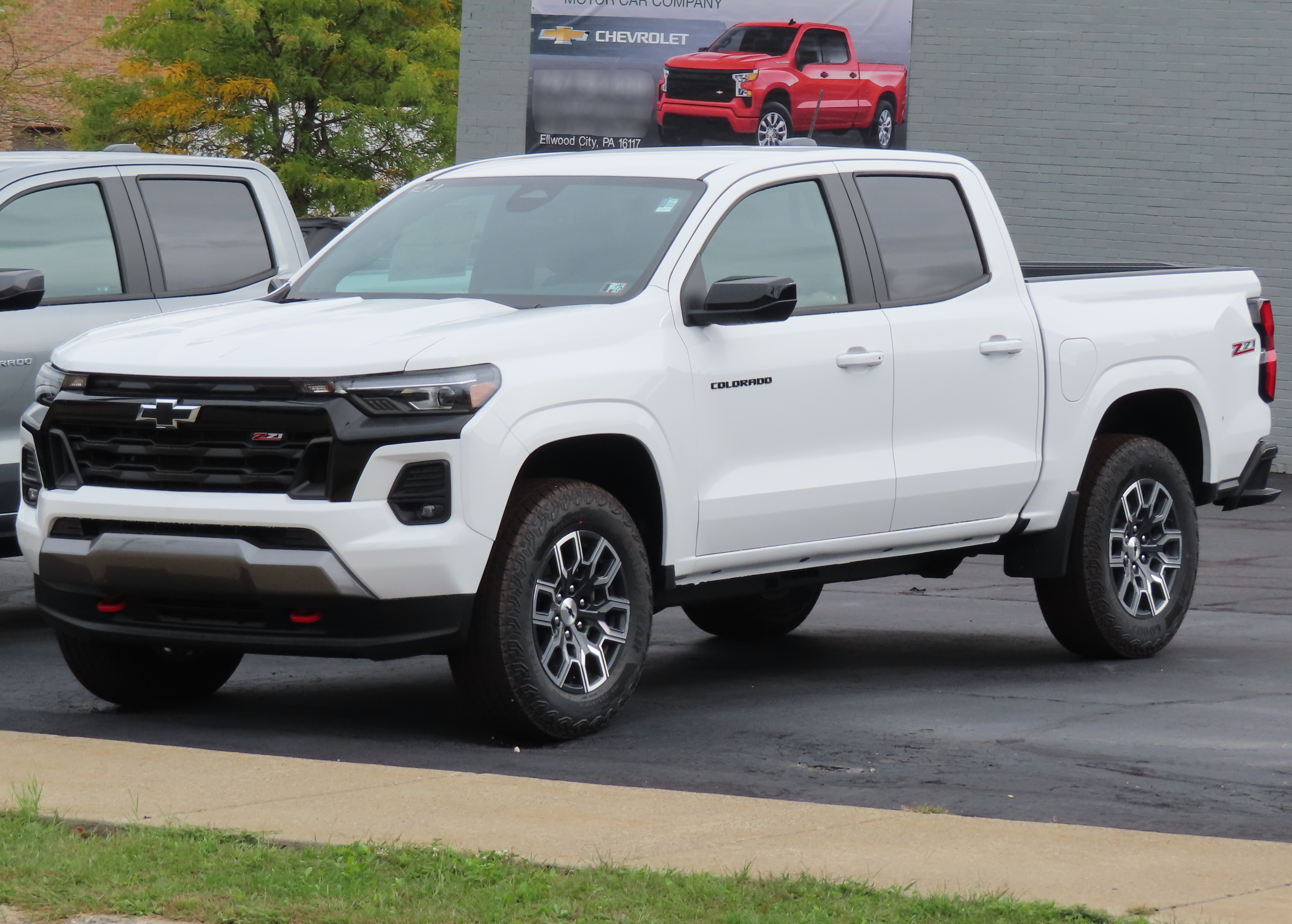
- 2024 Chevrolet Colorado Z71

Overview
- Manufacturer: General Motors
- Also called: GMC Canyon; Holden Colorado (Australasia)
- Production: 2003–2012, 2014–present (US); 2004–2020 (Thailand); 2011–present (Brazil)

Body and chassis
- Class: Compact pickup truck (2003–2011); Mid-size pickup truck (2011–present)
- Layout: Front-engine, rear-wheel-drive or four-wheel-drive

Chronology
- Predecessor: Chevrolet S-10/Isuzu Hombre/GMC Sonoma; Chevrolet D-Max (Latin America); Holden Rodeo (Australasia); Holden Ute/Holden One Tonner (Australasia)

The Chevrolet Colorado (sharing mechanical commonality with the GMC Canyon) is a series of compact pickup trucks (first generation) and mid-size pickup trucks (since second generation) marketed by American automaker General Motors. They were introduced in 2004 to replace the Chevrolet S-10 and GMC S-15/Sonoma compact pickups. The Colorado is named after the U.S. state of Colorado, while the Canyon took its name from the geological feature.

== First generation (2004) ==
First generation
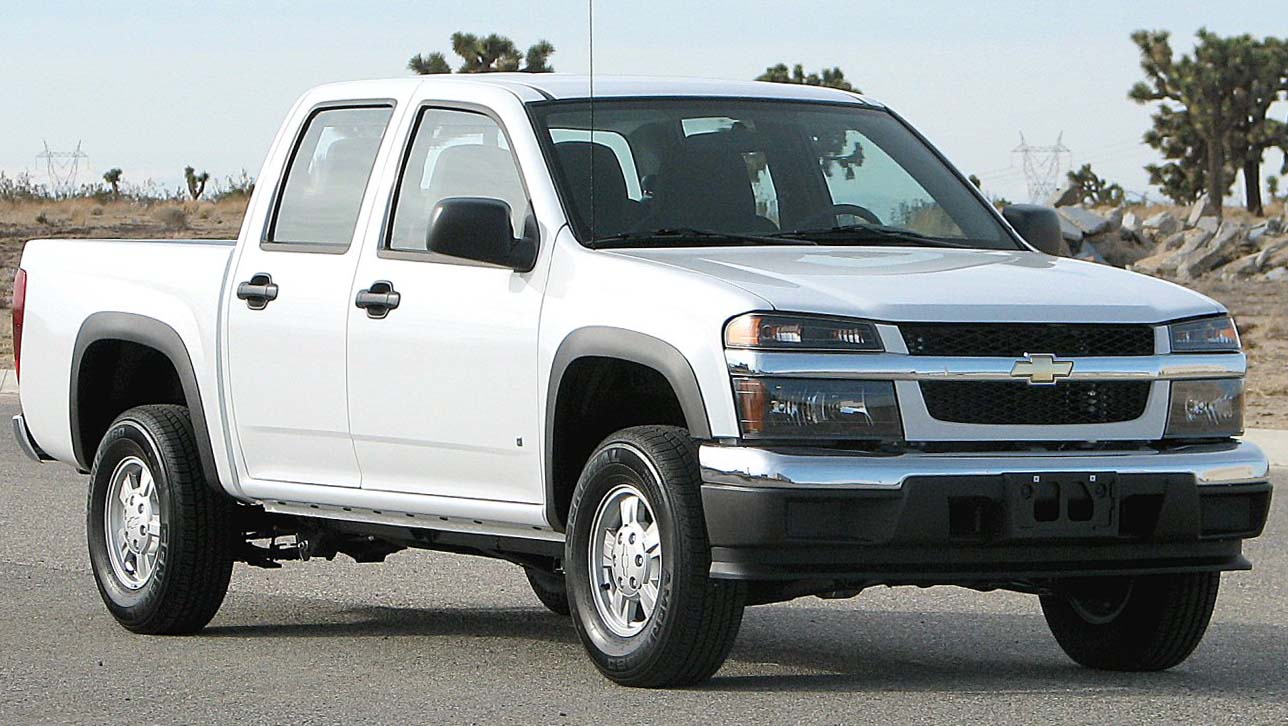
- 2006 Chevrolet Colorado Crew Cab

Overview
- Also called: GMC Canyon; Isuzu i-series; Holden Colorado (Australasia)
- Production: October 2003–August 2012
- Model years: 2004–2012
- Assembly: United States: Shreveport, Louisiana (Shreveport Assembly); Thailand: Rayong (GM Thailand)

Body and chassis
- Platform: GMT355
- Related: Isuzu D-Max (RA/RC); Isuzu MU-7; Hummer H3; Hummer H3T

Powertrain
- Engine: Gasoline: 2.8 L (171 cu in) LK5 I4; 2.9 L (177 cu in) LLV I4; 3.5 L (214 cu in) L52 I5; 3.7 L (226 cu in) LLR I5; 5.3 L (323 cu in) LH8 2009/LH9 2010+ V8; Diesel: 2.5 L (153 cu in) 4JK1-TC; 2.5 L (153 cu in) 4JK1-TC (Diesel/CNG; Colorado CNG); 3.0 L (183 cu in) 4JJ1-TC / 4JJ1-TCX VGS Turbo
- Transmission: 5-speed Aisin AR-5 manual; 4-speed 4L60-E automatic
- Hybrid drivetrain: Bi-Fuel system (Colorado CNG)

Dimensions
- Wheelbase: Regular cab 111.2 in (2,824 mm); Extended cab 126 in (3,200 mm); Crew cab 120 in (3,048 mm) (Thailand)
- Length: Regular cab 192 in (4,877 mm); Extended cab 207.1 in (5,260 mm); Crew cab 194 in (4,928 mm) (Thailand)
- Width: 68 in (1,727 mm); 70.8 in (1,798 mm) (Thailand Ver.)
- Height: 65 in (1,651 mm); 69.1 in (1,755 mm) (4x4 Thailand)

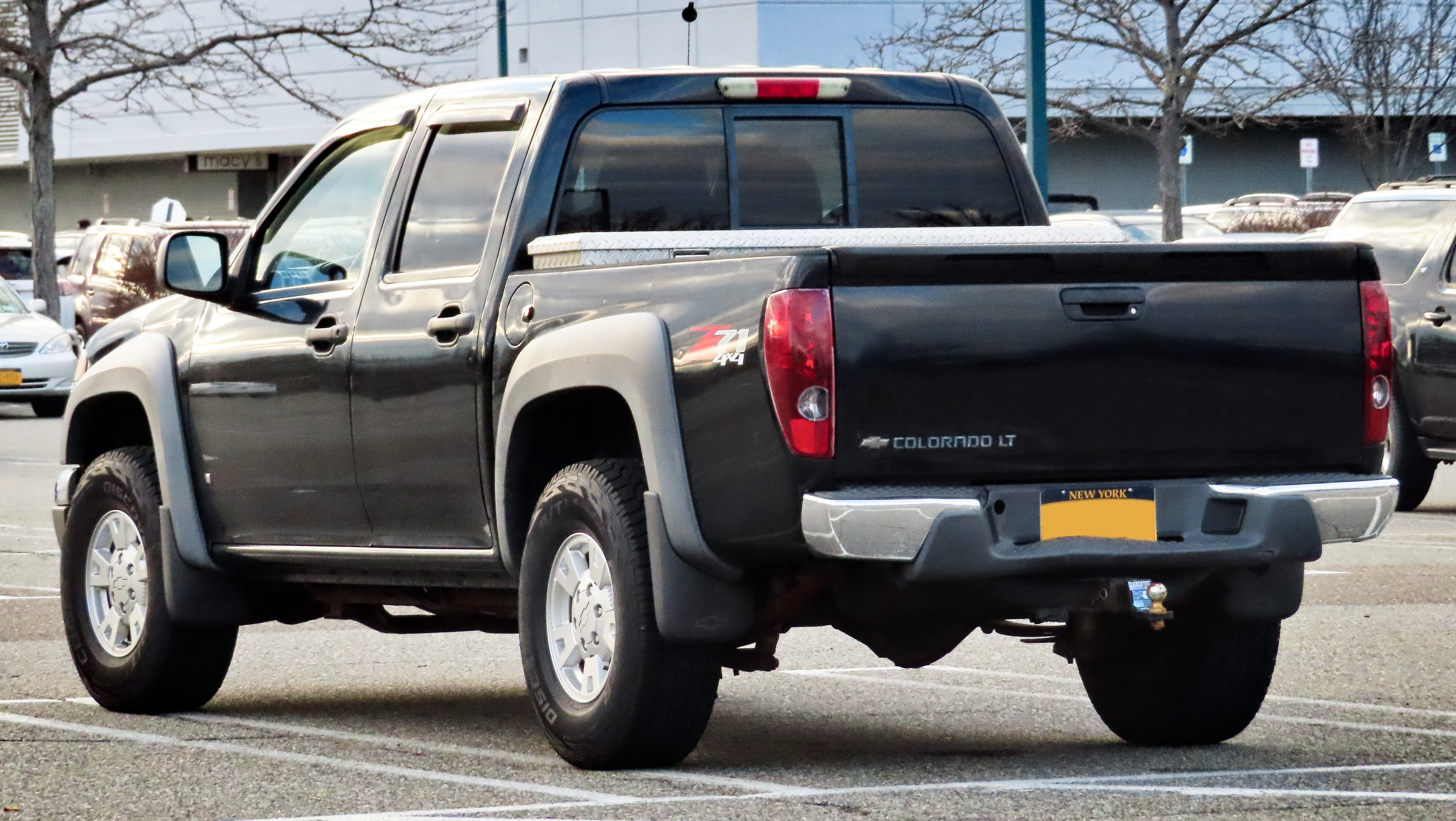
2007 Chevrolet Colorado LT Z71 (rear view)

The Chevrolet Colorado and its twin, the GMC Canyon, were jointly designed by GM's North American operations, GM's Brazil operations, and Isuzu, which began selling its own version worldwide in 2002. Production began in October 2003. In late 2005, Isuzu offered a version in North America called the Isuzu i-series. This North American model Isuzu shared North American powertrains, styling, and equipment with the Colorado/Canyon twins and differed from Isuzu's worldwide offering. All Chevrolet, GMC, and Isuzu versions worldwide are based on the GMT355, itself the basis for the GMT 345-based Hummer H3. Most vehicles for markets outside North America are manufactured at a GM plant in Rayong, Thailand. All North American-market vehicles were manufactured by Shreveport Operations.

The cooperation between GM and Isuzu to build a light-duty truck and offer it in North America returns to an original arrangement the two companies had in the 1970s with the Chevrolet LUV, a rebadged Isuzu Faster.

=== Markets ===
==== North America ====
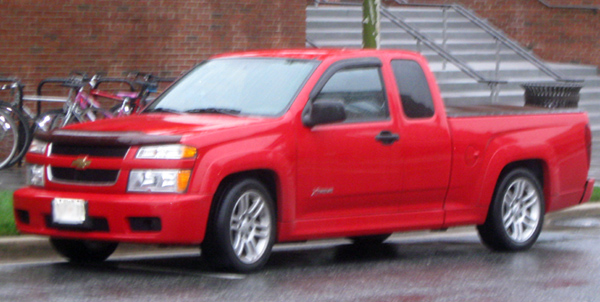
Chevrolet Colorado Xtreme extended cab

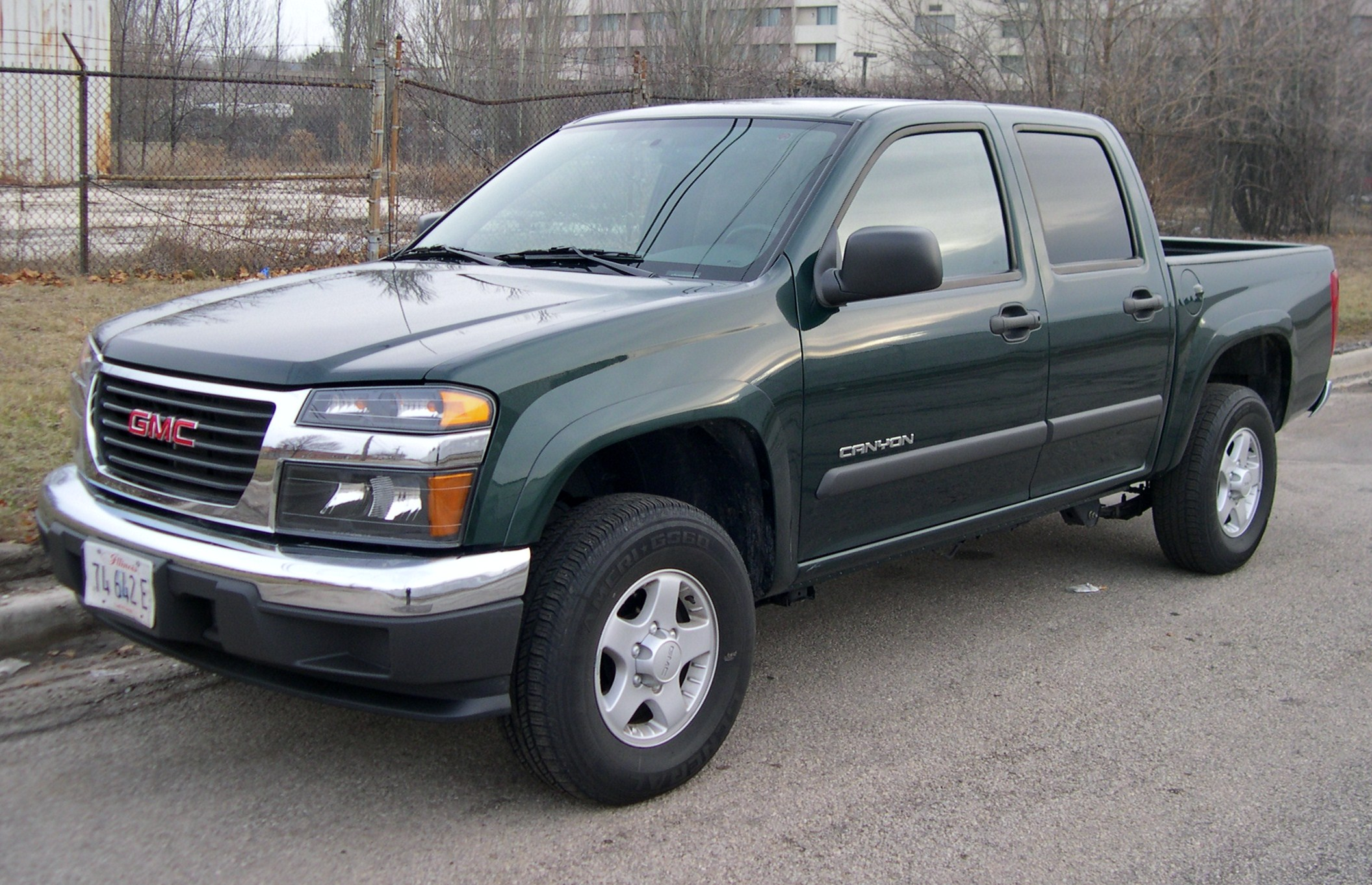
GMC Canyon crew cab

The Colorado/Canyon trucks in the North American market offer both manual and automatic transmissions. GM also offers either a rear-wheel drive (4x2) or four-wheel drive (4x4) drivetrain with standard, extended, and four-door crew-cab body styles. Most models come with the 2.8 L (171 cu in) LK5 I4 engine as standard, but a more powerful 3.5 L I5 comes with the Z71 package on four-door versions and is optional on all others. The 4-door Z71s also get the four-speed automatic transmission standard. This package was later dropped in favor of LT2 and LT3.

The Colorado was offered in three basic trim levels: Base, LS, and LT, while the Canyon was also offered in three trim levels, but with different names: Canyon, SLE, and SLT.

Three different cab configurations were offered on Colorado and Canyon: a two-door regular-cab model with a 6 ft (1.8 m) box and seating for either two or three passengers, a four-door extended-cab model with a 6 ft (1.8 m) box and seating for either four or five passengers, and a four-door crew-cab model with a shorter 5 ft (1.5 m) box and seating for either five or six passengers. Top trim levels in crew-cab configuration offered upscale features such as leather-trimmed seating surfaces, dual power-adjustable front bucket seats with lumbar support and heat, a six-disc, in-dash CD changer, XM satellite radio, and rear side-impact airbags.

Three different suspension options were offered on the Colorado and Canyon: The base Z85 suspension, which offered a comfortable ride quality; the Z71 Off-Road suspension, which added a locking rear differential axle (RPO code G80), heavier-duty shock absorbers for improved performance off-road, and an increased ride height for better clearance;the ZQ8 Sport suspension (see below), which offered a lower ride height than the standard Z85 suspension, as well as firmer suspension for improved handling. All suspension packages were offered on 4x2 or 4x4 models in all cab configurations, except for the ZQ8 Sport suspension, which was only offered on 4x2 models.

A ZQ8 edition is available with a lower and more road-tuned "sport" suspension than the standard Z85 and comes with 17 inch wheels, color-matched bumper and grille, and low profile fender flares. There is also a Xtreme edition of the ZQ8 which has a different front bumper, rear bumper, side skirts, fender flares, grille, headlights, and 18-inch wheels. The Xtreme edition is basically a continuation of a trim package from its predecessor, the Chevrolet S-10.

For 2007, Colorado/Canyon was facelifted and offered new engines, which include the 2.9 L (177 cu in) LLV I4 and 3.7 L (226 cu in) LLR I5 which were both introduced due to numerous head problems, new colors — Deep Ruby (Sonoma Red for the Canyon), Pace Blue (Sport Blue for the Canyon), and Imperial Blue (Midnight Blue for the Canyon), and new tires and wheels. Minor changes to the grille and interior for the LT models; the LS models kept the same pre-facelift look, similar to the facelift of the TrailBlazer in 2005. In addition, the "Colorado" and "Canyon" badges were phased out from the doors in favor of GM's corporate logo. For model year 2009, the Colorado was facelifted again and a new 5.3 L (323 cu in) LH8 V8 engine was added, producing 300 hp (224 kW) and 320 lb⋅ft (434 N⋅m). For the 2010 model year, the GM badges were phased out, although a few 2010 models had the GM logo on the doors.

In 2009, both trucks, as with most 2009 GM vehicles (and combined with OnStar), received a Bluetooth hands-free phone system for the first time as optional equipment. The six-disc in-dash CD changer was discontinued as well, leaving the single-disc CD/MP3 player, and a standard A/M-F/M only radio, with two-, four-, or six-speaker audio systems. Most later trucks received alloy wheels as standard equipment, with optional polished and chrome-plated wheels, in 16, 17, or 18-inch diameters. Only later base-model trucks received 16-inch steel wheels, which were a new wheel design. In addition, most newer trucks also featured standard SiriusXM satellite radio, when equipped with a CD/MP3 player.

Colorado/Canyon U.S. sales peaked in 2005 at 163,204 units, surpassing the perennial segment leader, the Ford Ranger, by almost 35% and just 3.3% behind the new best-seller, the Toyota Tacoma. In 2006, however, while still leading the Ranger by 27.5%, the Colorado/Canyon's sales lagged their Toyota competitor's by almost 34%. One 2005 Canyon owned by successful U.S. Senate candidate Scott Brown became famous as it was widely featured in his TV advertisements.

==== Safety ====
In the Insurance Institute for Highway Safety's frontal offset test, the Colorado (extended version) is given a "Good" overall score, however the crew cab is rated "Acceptable". In the side impact test, the Colorado crew cab is rated "Poor" with or without side curtain airbags. Side curtain airbags were made standard on all 2010 models; side torso airbags are not offered.

==== Isuzu i-series ====
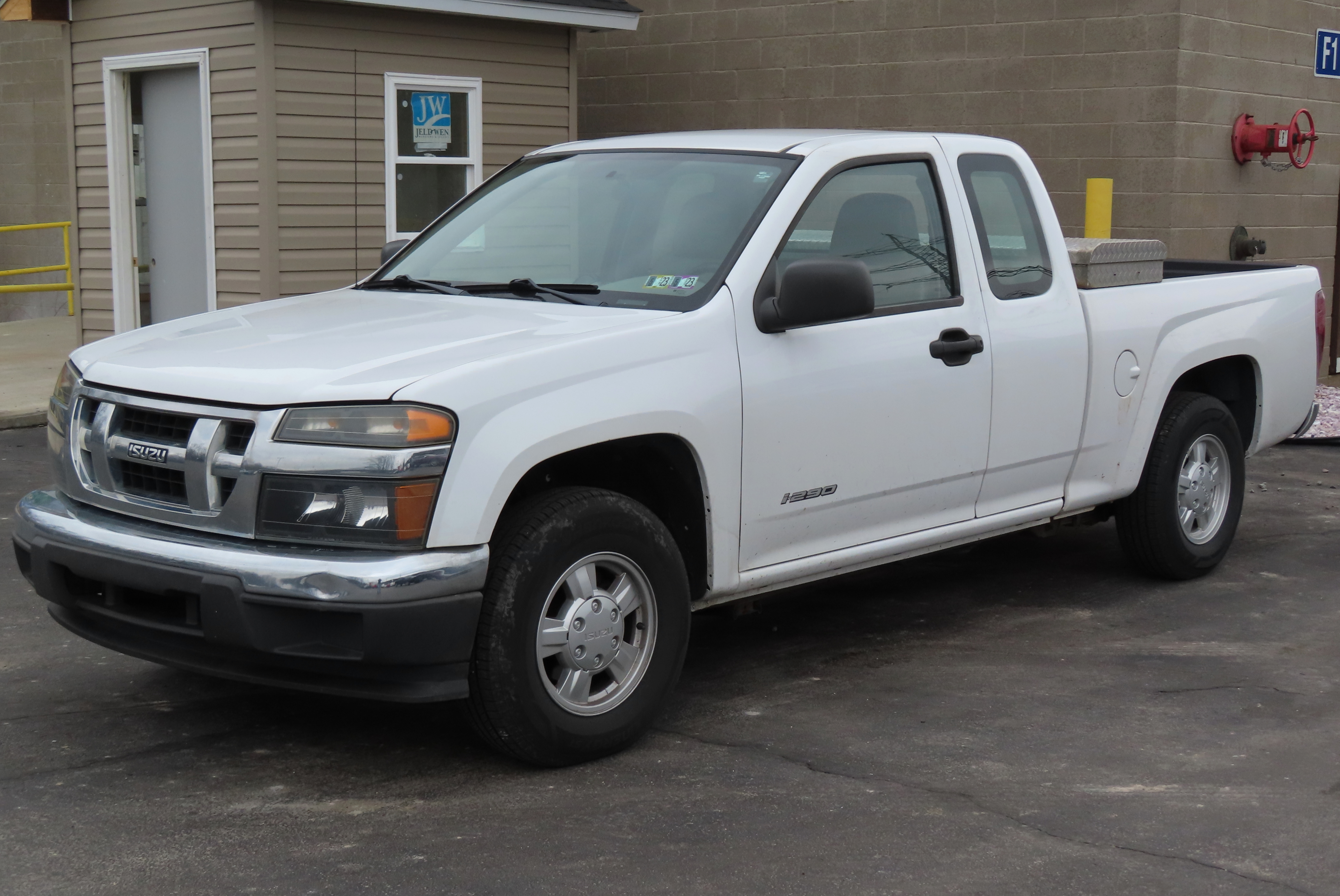
Isuzu i-290

The Isuzu i-series midsized pickup truck line was manufactured from 2005 to 2008, and was sold exclusively in the United States. Launched at the 2005 New York International Auto Show, for the 2006 model year, the i-series replaced the Hombre, which had been out of production since 2000. Like the Hombre, which was based on the compact Chevrolet S-10/GMC Sonoma, the i-series was based on the Chevrolet Colorado/GMC Canyon.

Two models were offered at launch: the i-280, powered by the 2.8 L I4 engine, and the i-350, powered by the 3.5 L I5 engine. The i-280 was available only with an extended cab, while the i-350 could be had with either an extended cab or crew cab. The i-280 and i-350 were replaced by the i-290 and i-370 respectively for 2007, with the introduction of the 2.9L and 3.7L engines.

The sales for the i-series were poor, with just 1,377 sold from the start of production through February 2006, according to Automotive News. As part of Isuzu's withdrawal from the United States market after the 2008 model year, the i-series was discontinued.

==== Thailand ====
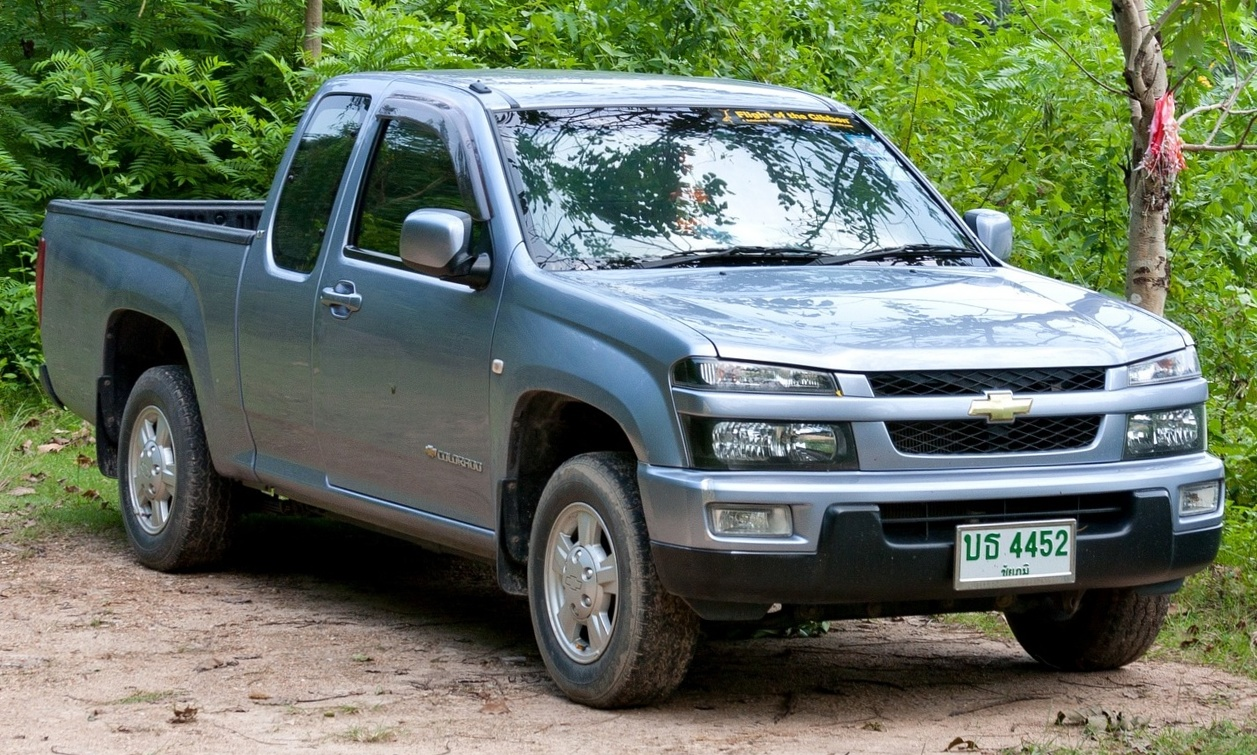
Chevrolet Colorado extended cab (pre-facelift, Thailand)

GM Thailand manufactured the Colorado from March 2004 with a mildly altered styling compared to the North American version. In late January 2006, Chevrolet introduced a G-80 differential lock system as optional for most Colorado trim levels. This feature is not available on the D-Max. Thai-market Colorados received a minor redesign in late 2007, with the front fascia being altered by toning down the American influence. The facelifted model was exported to Australia as the Holden Colorado from 2008.

In 2008, GM also introduced the Colorado 4x2 2.5 with diesel dual fuel system via CNG tank. It is switchable between diesel fuel and compressed natural gas with the ratio of 65:35. It is also compatible with pure diesel and biodiesel B5 fuel. Location of the tank is on the bed behind the cab. It was available for two cab styles.

==== Australia and New Zealand ====
The Colorado was released in Australia and New Zealand in 2008 as the Holden Colorado. It replaced the D-Max-based Holden Rodeo due to the split between General Motors and Isuzu. Imported from Thailand, it is essentially a rebadged version of the facelifted Thai-specification Colorado, retaining its front styling. As with the Rodeo, the Colorado is available as either 4x2 or 4x4 and in a range of body styles, including single-cab, space-cab, and crew-cab. Power is provided by a range of gasoline and diesel engines. Of the gasoline engines, Holden offers a 2.4-liter four-cylinder and the Australian-made 3.6-liter Alloytec engine. The diesel powerplant is a four-cylinder Isuzu 4JJ1 unit displacing 3.0 liters. It was replaced by the second-generation Holden Colorado in 2012.

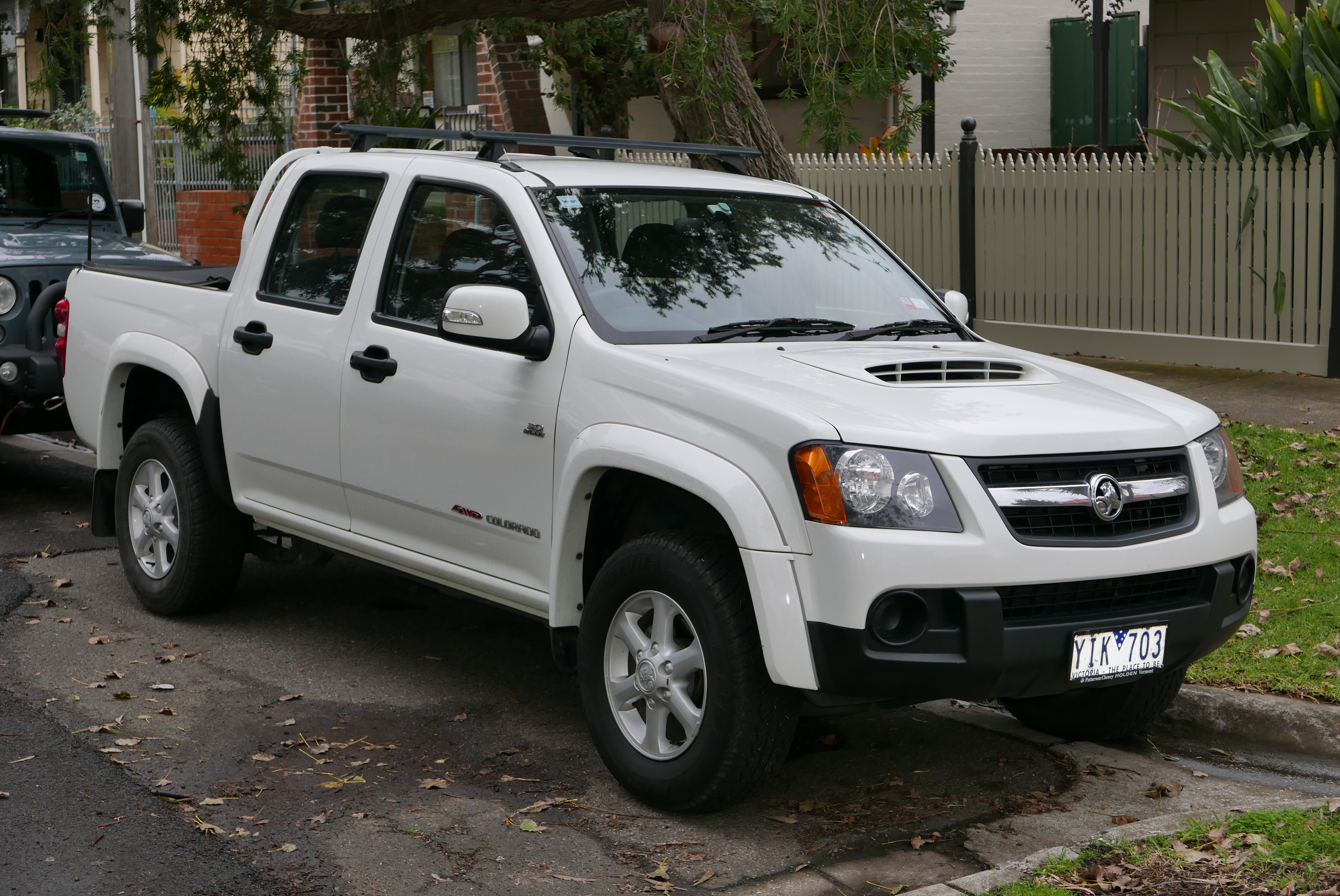
2011 Holden Colorado LX-R 4x4 Crew Cab (Australia)

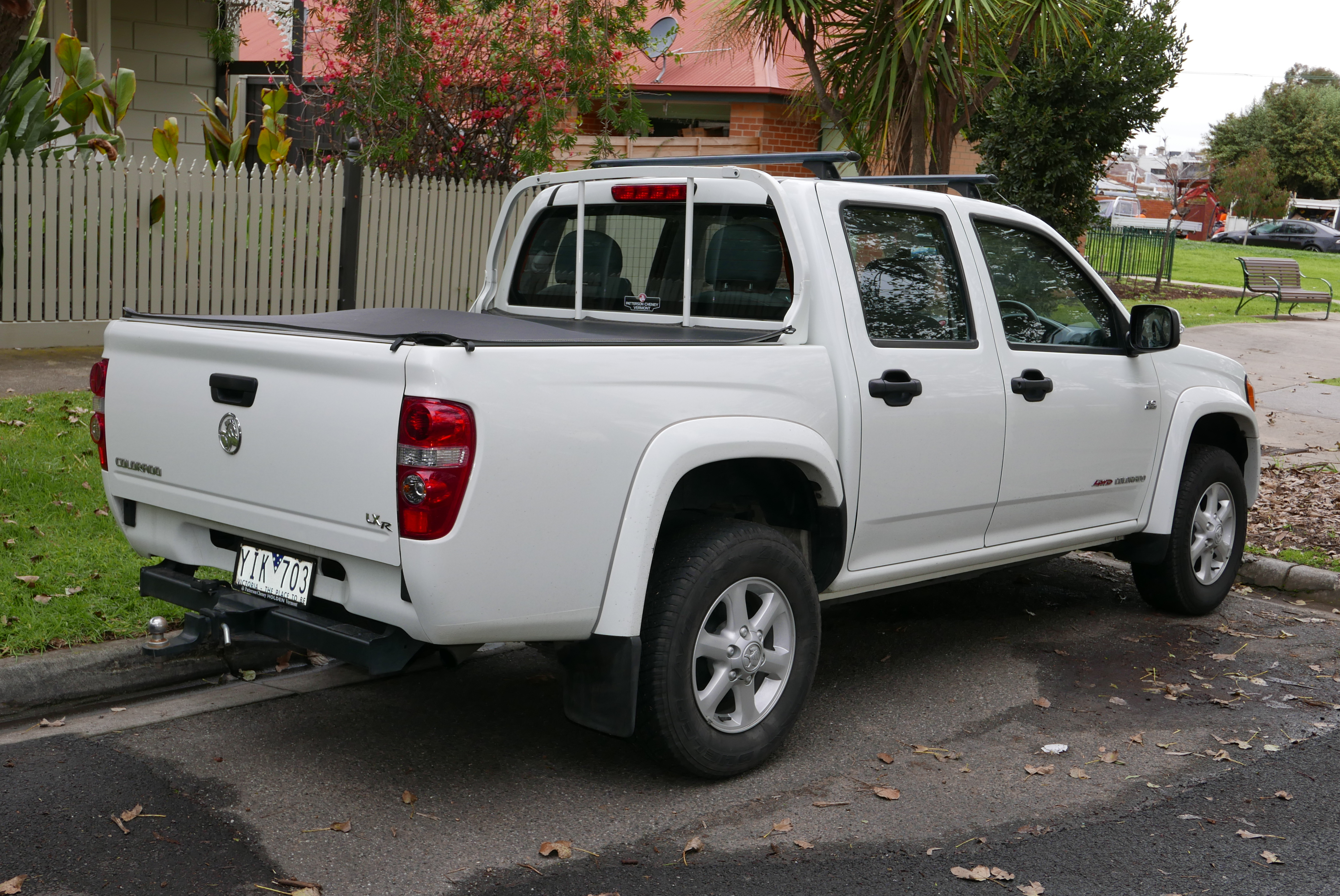
2011 Holden Colorado LX-R 4x4 Crew Cab (Australia)

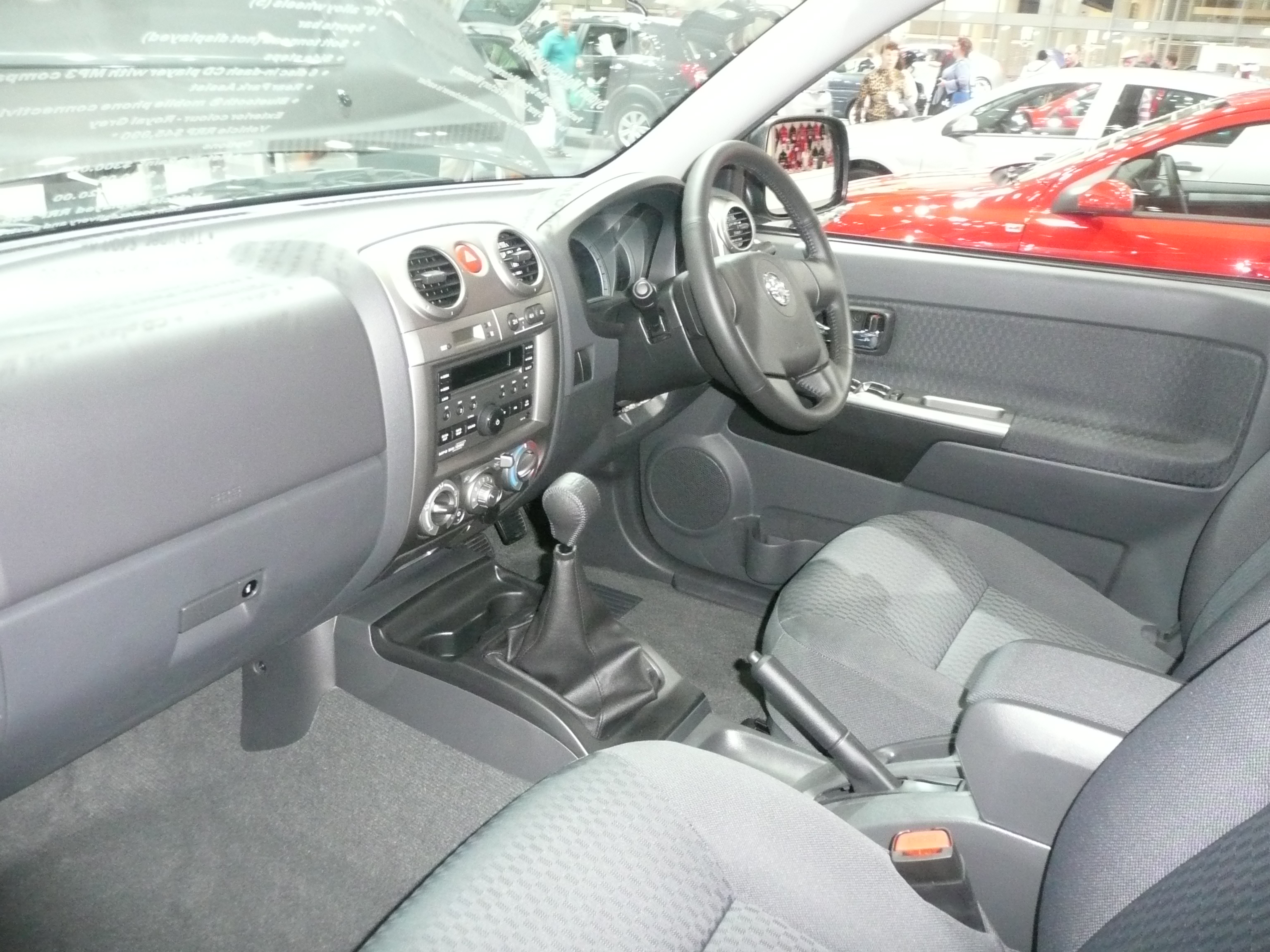
Interior

=== Engines ===
Years	Engine	Power	Torque
2004–2012	2.5 L (153 cu in) 4JK1-TC (2.5 CTI) Turbo I4	116 hp (87 kW) @ 3,600 rpm	206 lb⋅ft (279 N⋅m) @ 1,800–2,200 rpm
2004–2012	3.0 L (183 cu in) 4JJ1-TC (3.0 CTI) Turbo I4	146 hp (109 kW) @ 3,600 rpm	216 lb⋅ft (293 N⋅m) @ 1,400–3,400 rpm
2006–2012	3.0 L (183 cu in) 4JJ1-TCX (3.0 CTI Max) VGS Turbo I4	163 hp (122 kW) @ 3,600 rpm	265.5 lb⋅ft (360 N⋅m) @ 1,400–3,400 rpm
2004–2006	2.8 L (173 cu in) LK5 I4	175 hp (130 kW) @ 5,600 rpm	185 lb⋅ft (251 N⋅m) @ 2,800 rpm
2007–2012	2.9 L (178 cu in) LLV I4	185 hp (138 kW) @ 5,600 rpm	190 lb⋅ft (258 N⋅m) @ 2,800 rpm
2004–2006	3.5 L (214 cu in) L52 I5	220 hp (164 kW) @ 5,600 rpm	225 lb⋅ft (305 N⋅m) @ 2,800 rpm
2007–2008	3.7 L (223 cu in) LLR I5	242 hp (180 kW) @ 5,600 rpm	242 lb⋅ft (328 N⋅m) @ 2,800 rpm
2009–2012	3.7 L (223 cu in) LLR I5	242 hp (180 kW) @ 5,600 rpm	242 lb⋅ft (328 N⋅m) @ 4,600 rpm
2009	5.3 L (325 cu in) LH8 V8	300 hp (224 kW) @ 5,200 rpm	320 lb⋅ft (434 N⋅m) @ 4,000 rpm
2010–2012	5.3 L (325 cu in) LH9 V8	300 hp (224 kW) @ 5,200 rpm	320 lb⋅ft (434 N⋅m) @ 4,000 rpm

== Second generation (RG; 2011) ==
Second generation
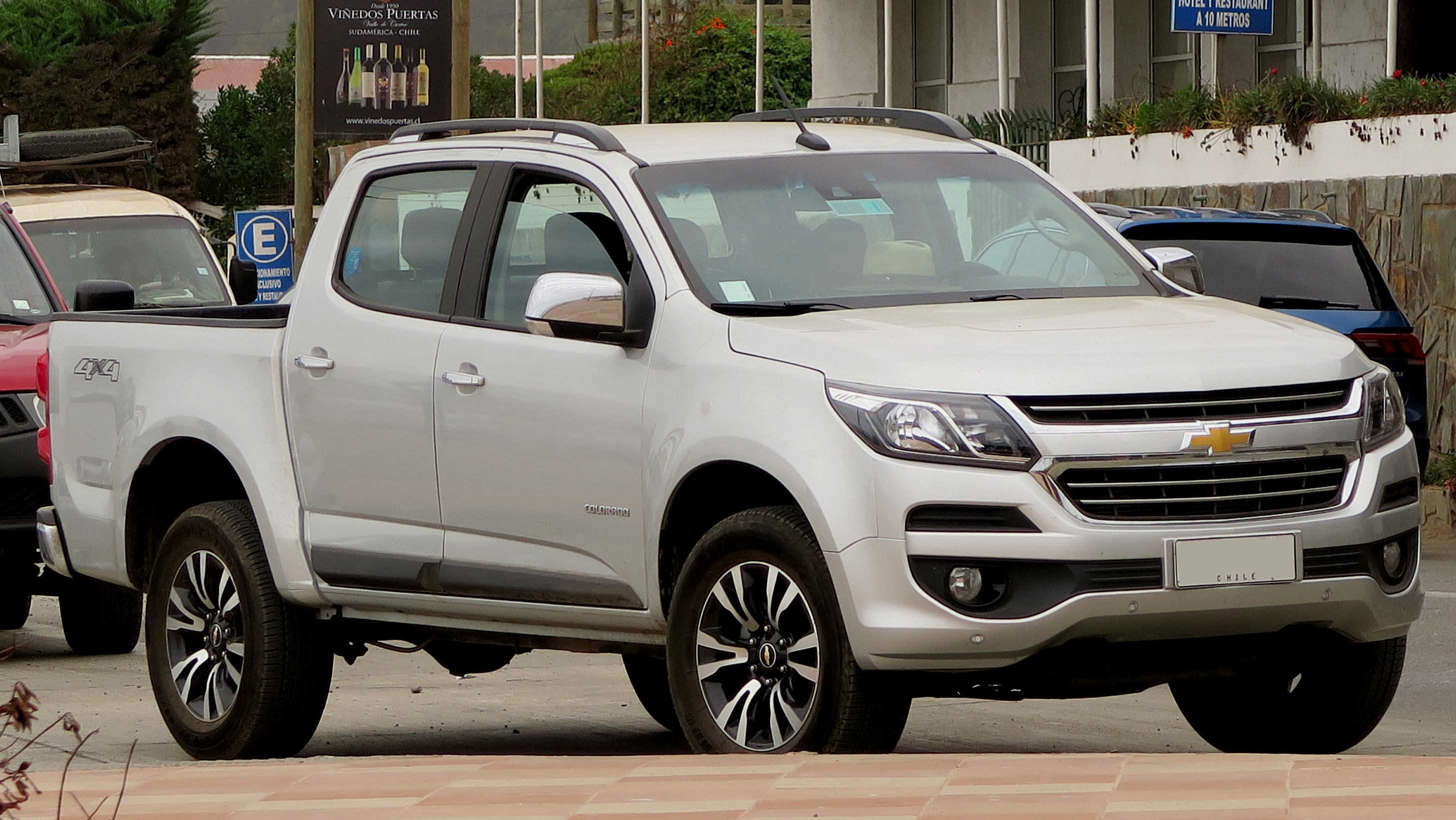
- 2018 Chevrolet Colorado (first facelift)

Overview
- Model code: RG
- Also called: Chevrolet S10 (Mercosur); Holden Colorado (Australasia); HSV SportsCat (Australasia); GMC Canyon (US and Canada)
- Production: 2011–present; 2014–2022 (North America); 2019–2024 (South Korea); 2011–2020 (Thailand)
- Model years: 2015–2022 (US and Canada)
- Assembly: Brazil: São José dos Campos (GM do Brasil); Thailand: Rayong (GM Thailand); United States: Wentzville, Missouri (Wentzville Assembly)

Body and chassis
- Platform: GMT 31XX
- Related: Chevrolet Trailblazer; Isuzu D-Max (RT); Isuzu MU-X (RF); Qingling Taga

Powertrain
- Engine: Gasoline: 2.4 L Flexpower I4 (ethanol); 2.5 L Ecotec (LCV) I4; 3.6 L High Feature (LFX)/LGZ) V6; Diesel: 2.5 L Duramax XLD25/LP2 I4 turbo; 2.8 L Duramax (LWN) I4 turbo
- Transmission: 5-speed manual; 6-speed manual Eaton N8D; 6-speed automatic 6L50; 8-speed automatic 8L45

Dimensions
- Wheelbase: 3,258–3,568 mm (128.3–140.5 in)
- Length: 5,083–5,712 mm (200.1–224.9 in)
- Width: 1,882–1,887 mm (74.1–74.3 in)
- Height: 1,781–1,790 mm (70.1–70.5 in)
- Curb weight: 3,920–4,310 lb (1,778–1,955 kg) (Ext Cab); 4,010–4,476 lb (1,819–2,030 kg) (Crew cab)

Chronology
- Predecessor: Chevrolet S-10 (Mercosur)

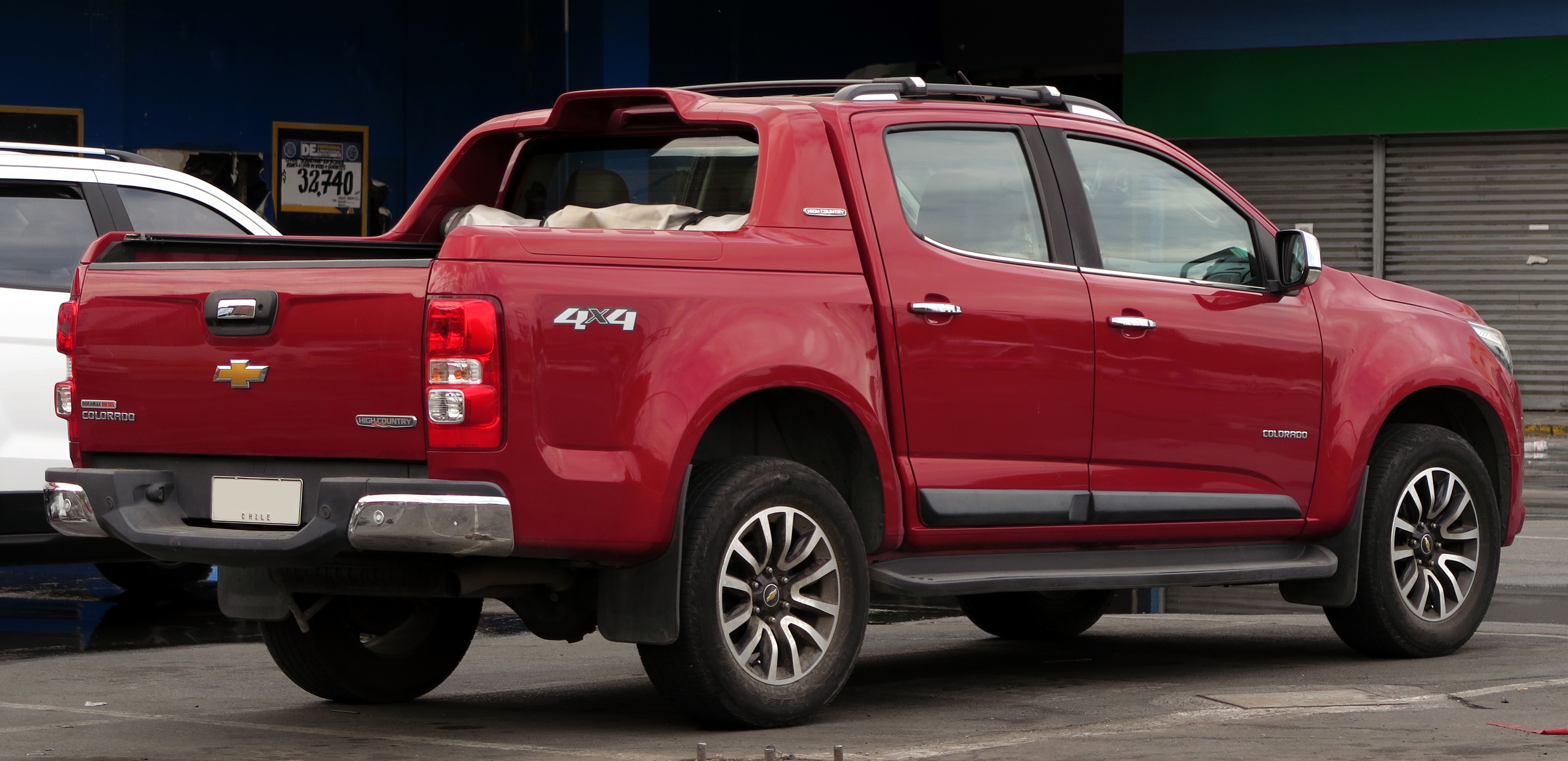
Rear

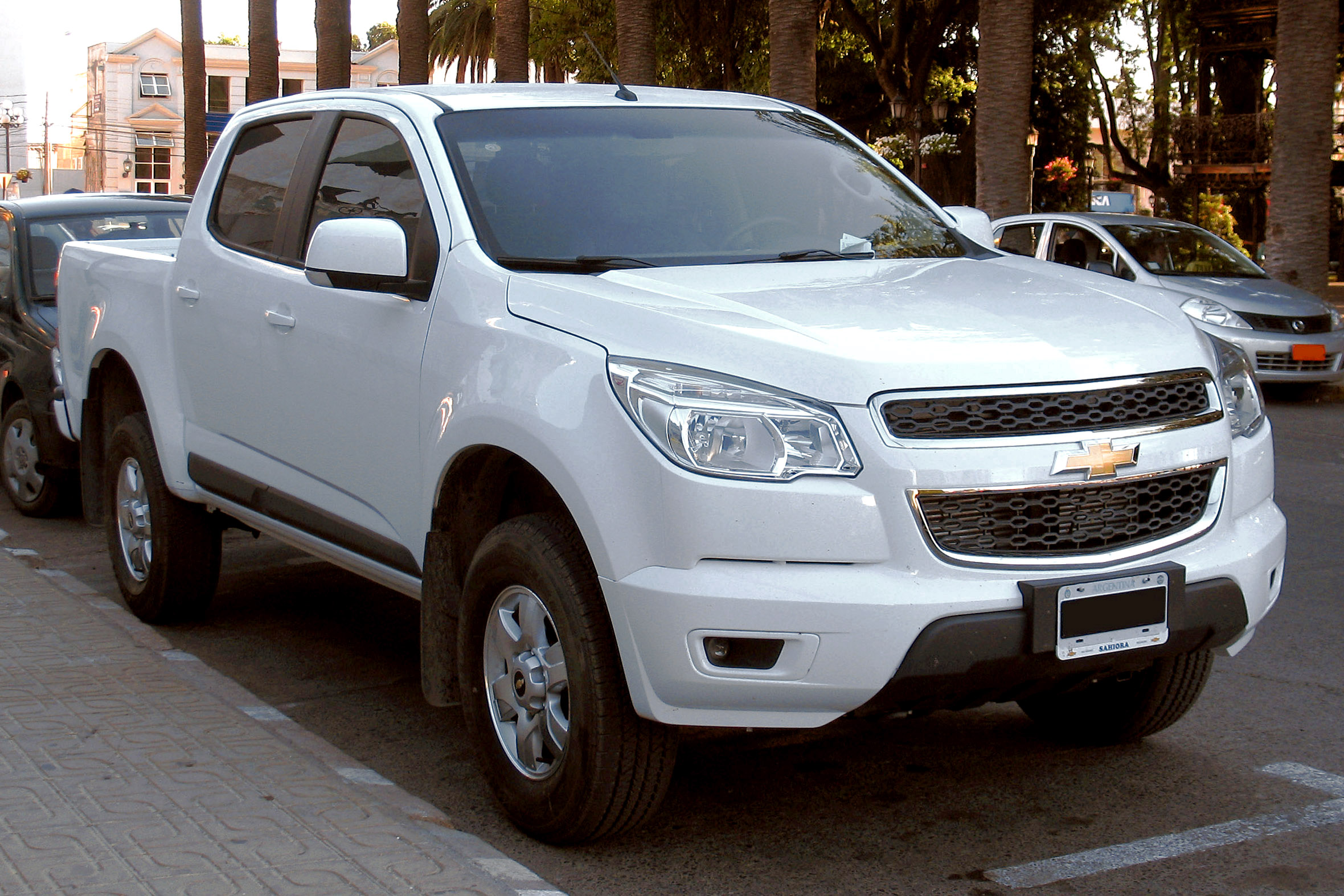
Pre-facelift (2011–2015)

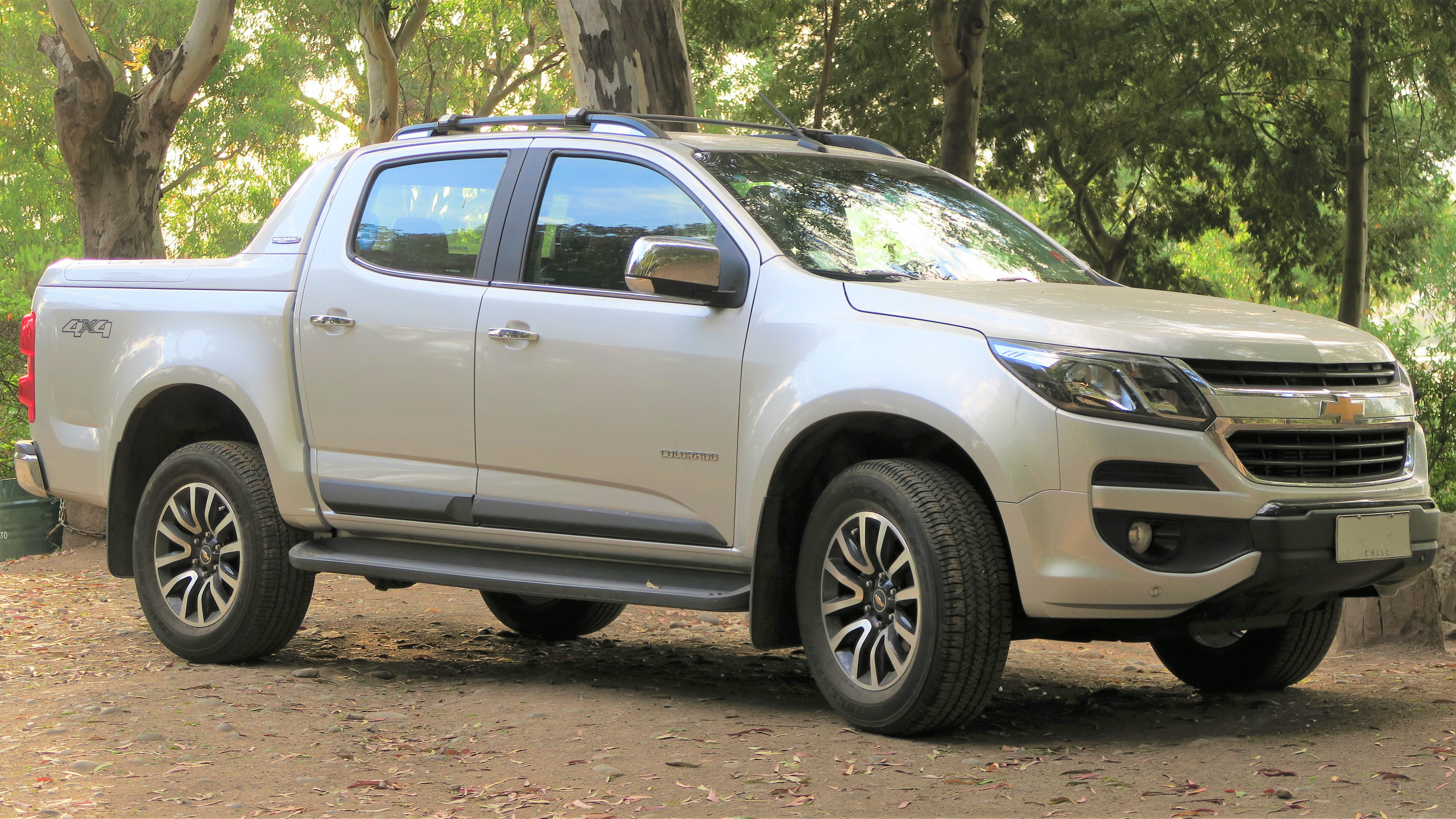
First facelift (2015–2021)

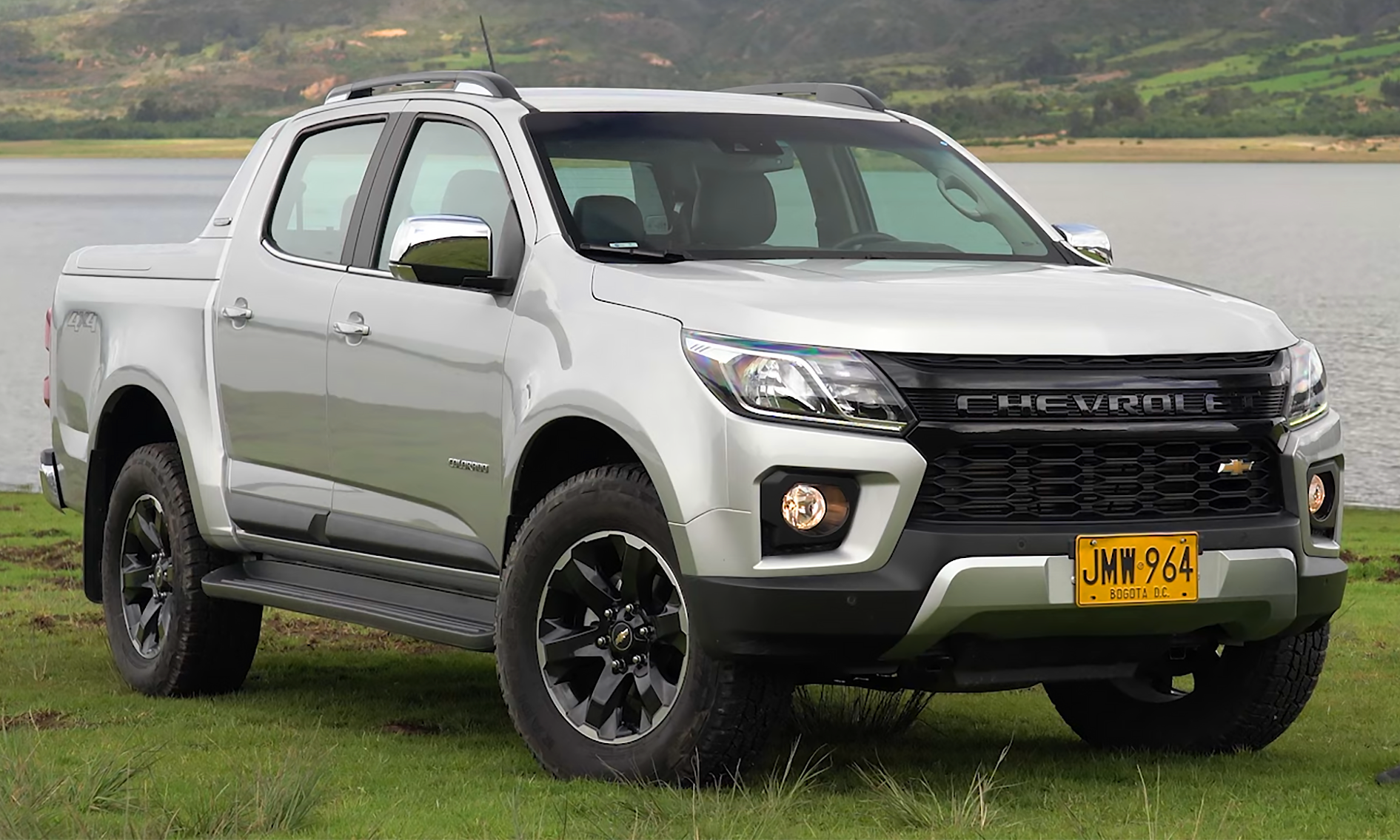
Second facelift (2021–2024)

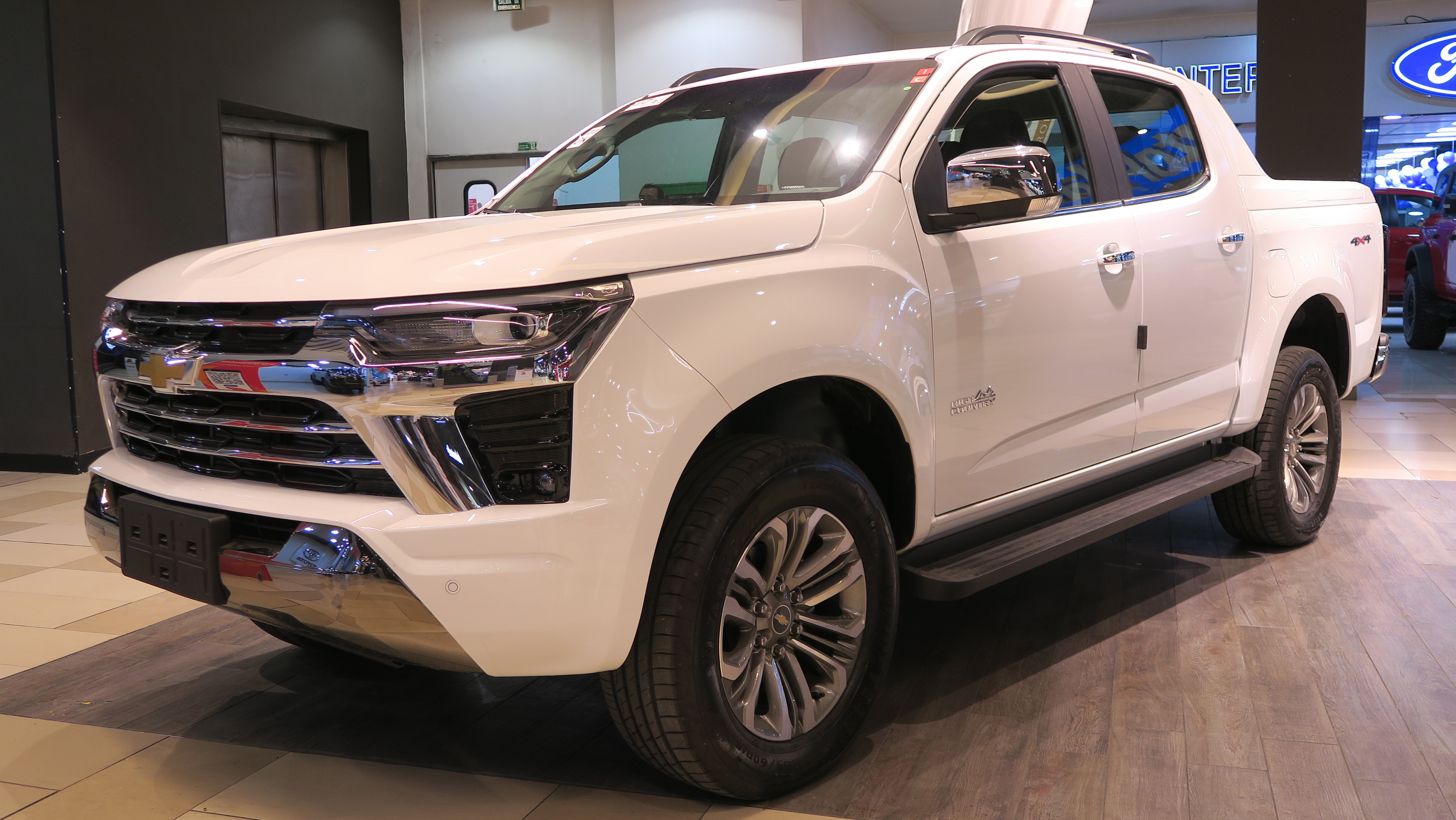
Third facelift (2024–present)

=== Global version ===
In March 2011, Chevrolet revealed the prototype version of the all-new Colorado at Bangkok International Motor Show. It was shown as an extended cab with a rear access system, and some of the high-tech equipment. In June 2011, Chevrolet revealed its crew cab in adventure concept at Buenos Aires, Argentina (this car also shown at Frankfurt Motor Show in September 2011), and in July 2011, a Holden version of crew-cab version concept got its premiere at Australian International Motor Show.

The production model is available in three different cab styles: regular cab (single cab), extended cab (space cab), and crew cab (double cab), and either 4x2 or 4x4 drivetrain.

On 9 September 2011, General Motors (Thailand) opened the diesel engine manufacturing plant, to make the Duramax engine used by the Colorado. The engine is a rebranded VM Motori turbodiesel engine with 2.5- or 2.8-liter, paired with a manual or automatic transmission.

==== Holden Colorado ====
The Colorado was revealed at the 2011 Australian International Motor Show and went on sale in June 2012 in both Australia and New Zealand, sourced from the Rayong factory in Thailand. In Australia and New Zealand, the Colorado is badged as a Holden. Only one engine is offered, the 2.8 L turbo diesel, built by GM in the Rayong factory. It is available in four trim levels: DX (single cab chassis only), LX, LT, and LTZ. An LS trim was introduced in 2014. Single-cab and crew-cab models are available as either 4x2 or 4x4.

The facelifted Colorado model for the Australian and New Zealand markets was released in 2017 with GM's MyLink infotainment system including Apple CarPlay and Android Auto smartphone mirroring. The model is built in right-hand drive at the GM Thailand plant.

A Thunder Edition is available on 4x4 LX, LT, and LTZ models. Among the features included with the pack are a nudge bar and towing kit, front carpet floor mats and a one-piece rear carpet floor mat, a bonnet protector, slimline weather shields, and "Thunder" badging.

Production of the Colorado in Thailand ended in 2020 as General Motors ended operations in the country. A refresh in line with the global Colorado was planned for the 2021 model year.

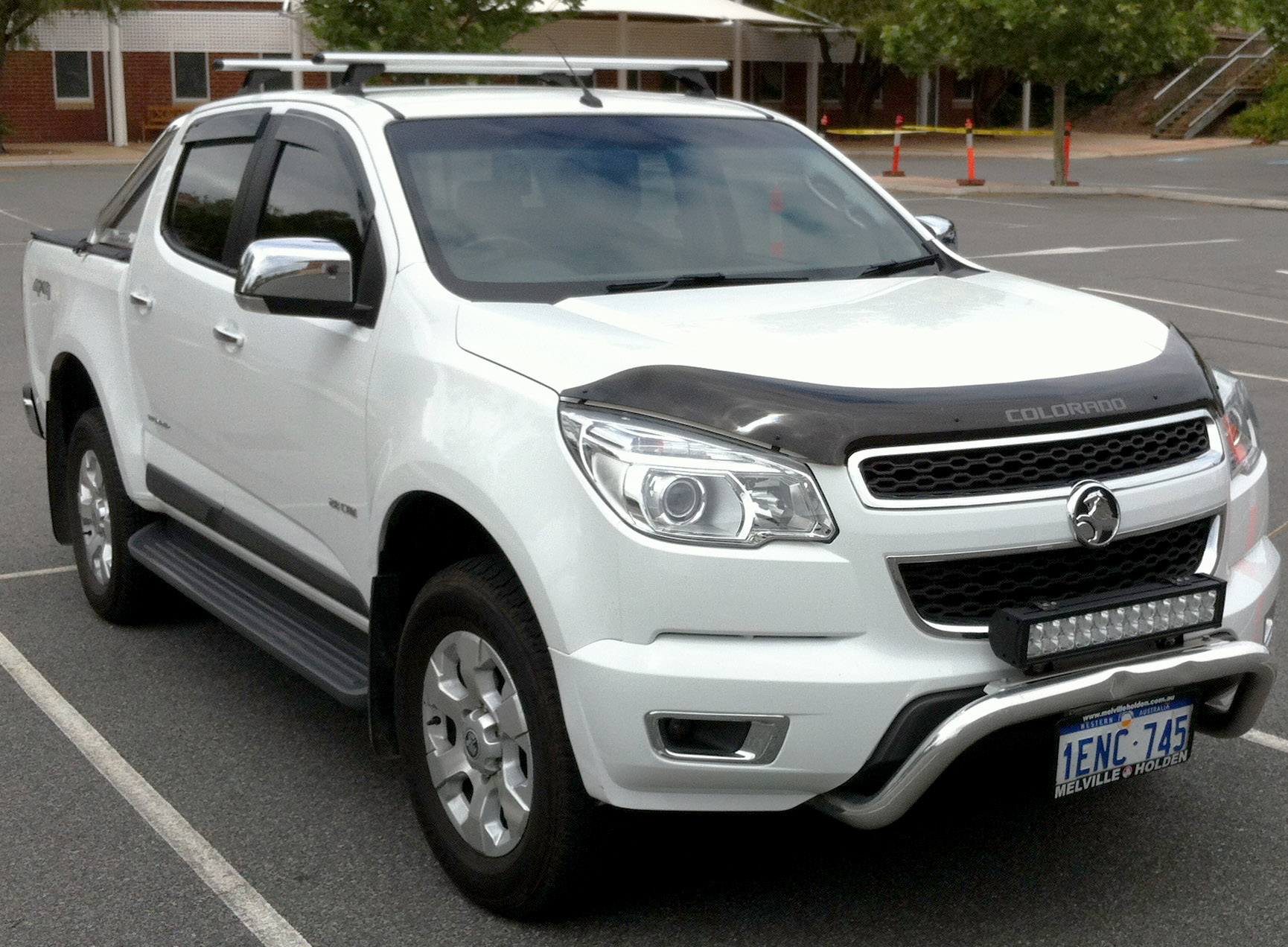
2014 Holden Colorado LTZ (pre-facelift)

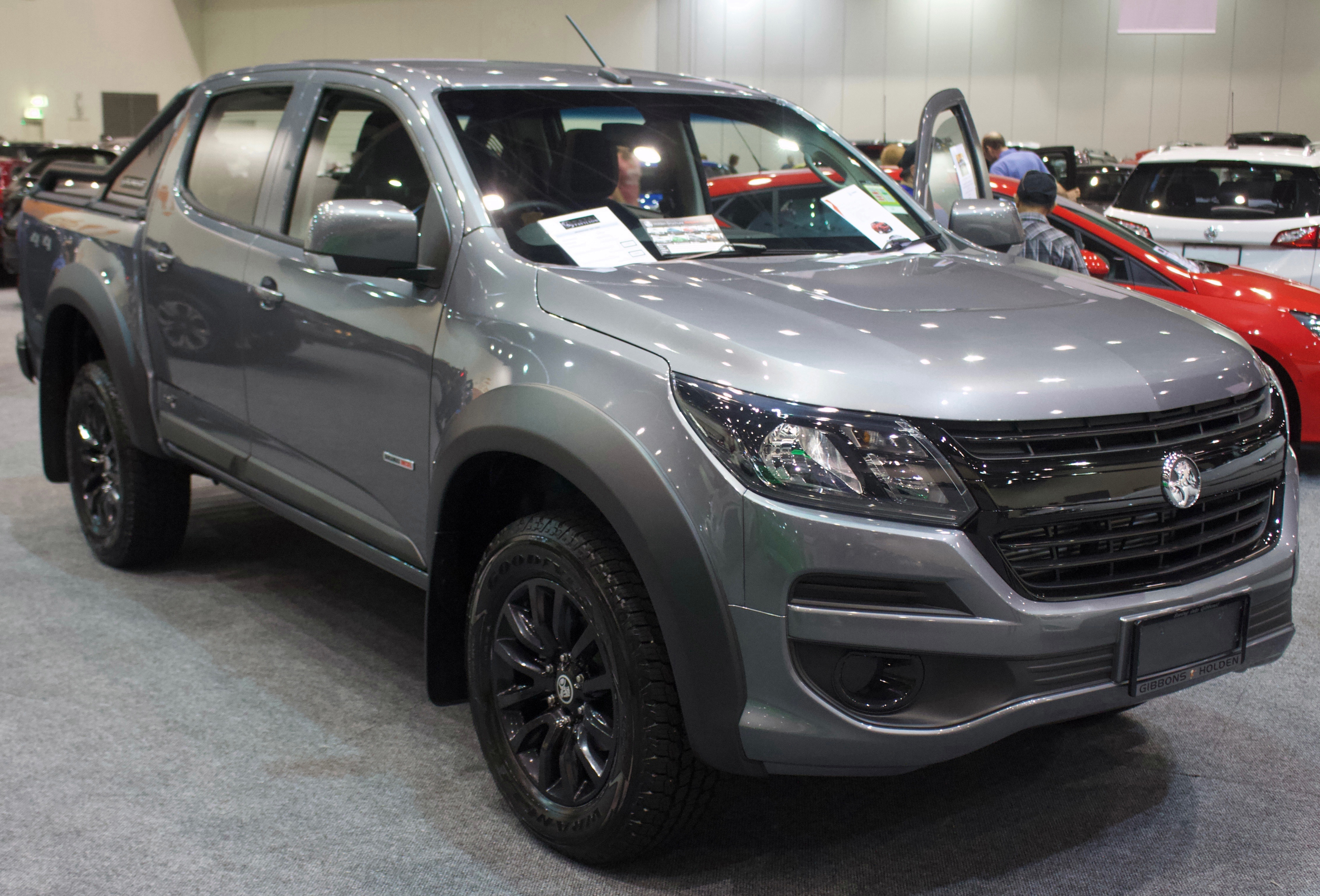
2018 Holden Colorado LSX (facelift)

===== Trim levels =====
- DX features a manual transmission, electronic stability control, side-curtain airbags, Bluetooth capabilities, and 16-inch steel wheels.
- LX features either a six-speed manual or six-speed automatic transmission, power mirrors, and cruise control.
- LT features fog lamps.
- LTZ features 17-inch alloy wheels, optional leather seats, LED taillamps, projector headlamps, sports bar, soft tonneau cover, and side steps.
- Z71, the top trim, includes off-road gear and 18-inch wheels.

=== North American version ===
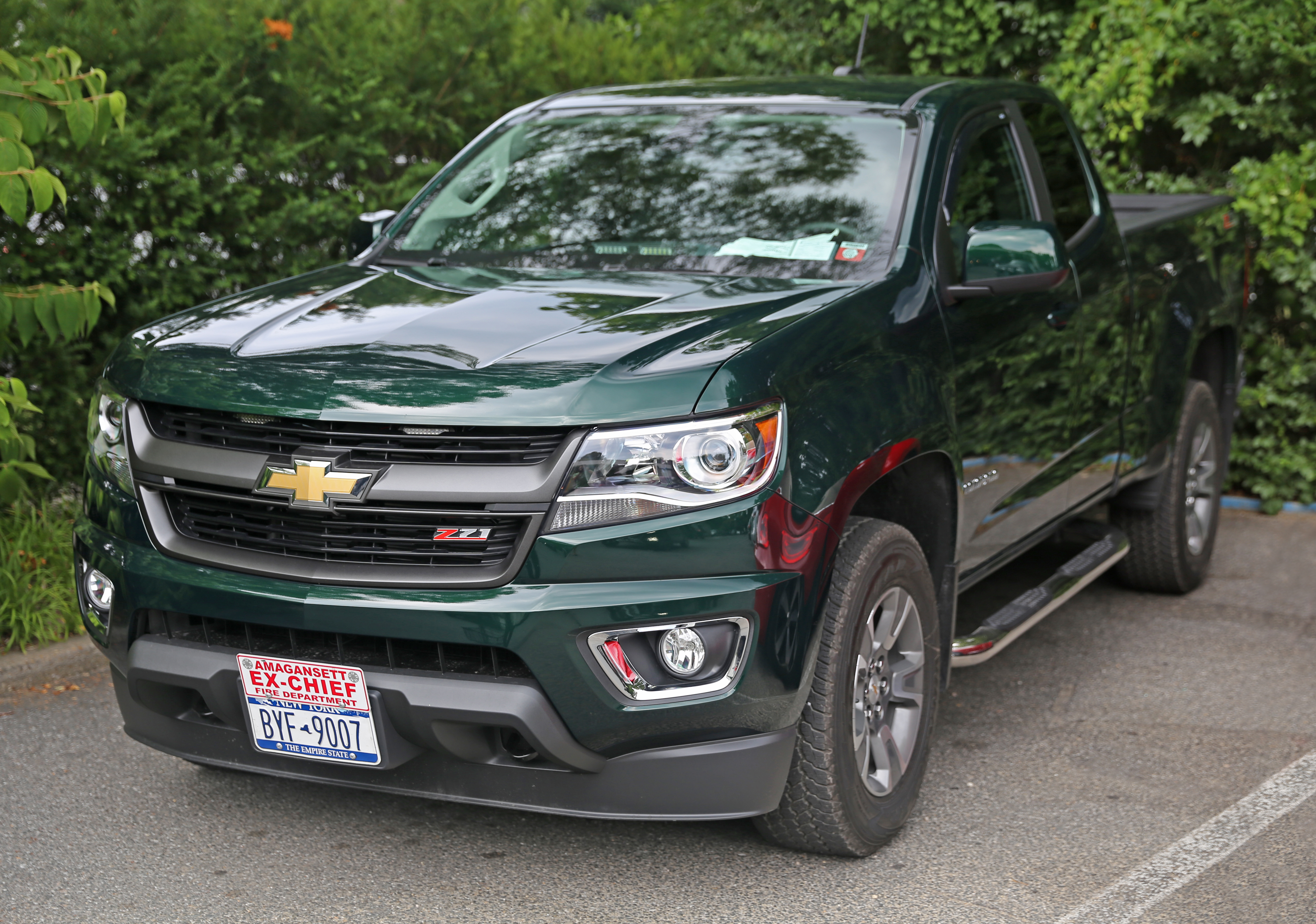
2015 Chevrolet Colorado (United States)

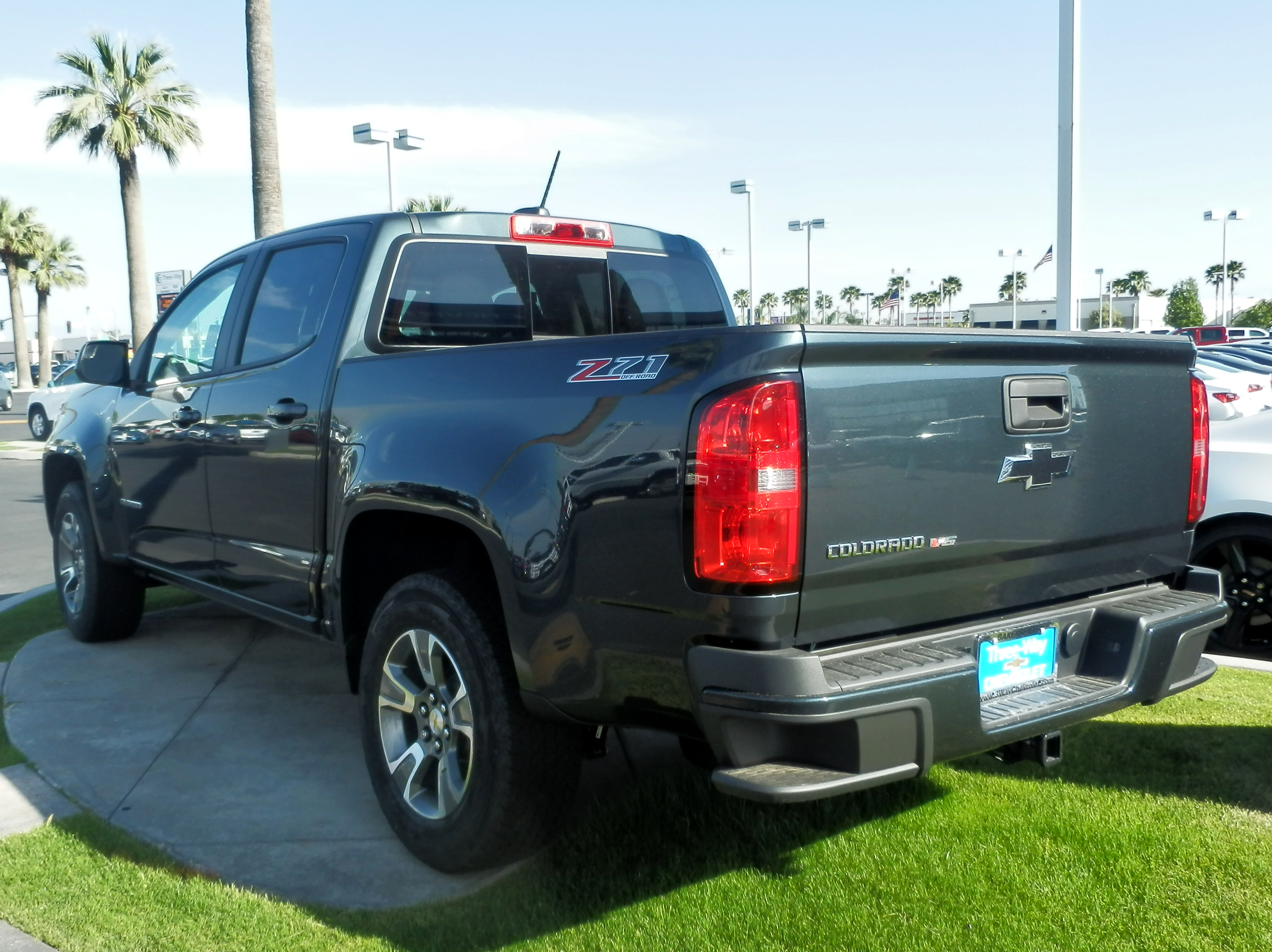
Chevrolet Colorado (US)

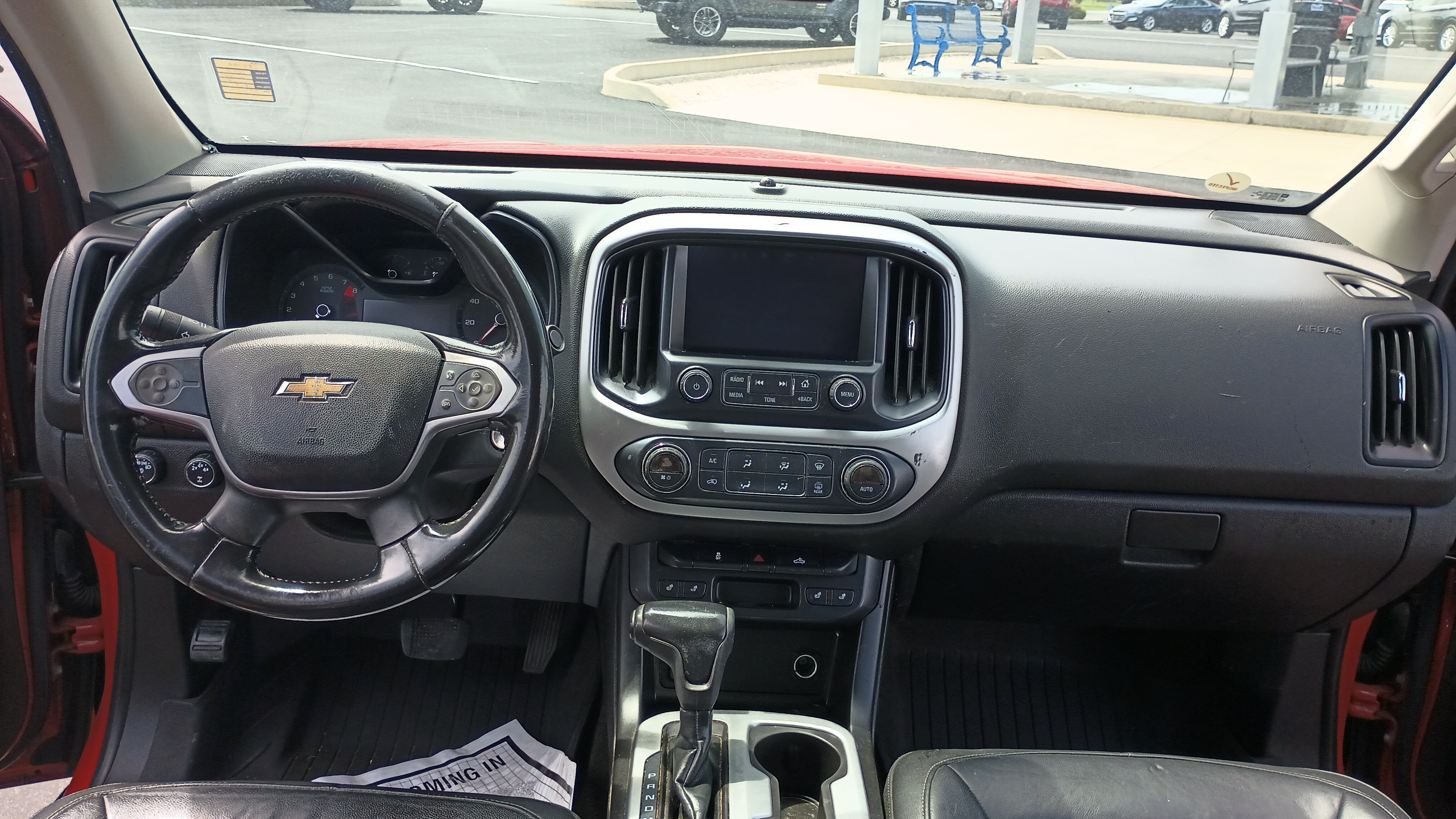
Interior

The North American model was revealed on November 20, 2013, at the Los Angeles Auto Show. Production began at Wentzville Assembly in 2014, and vehicles started arriving at dealerships nationwide by mid- to late 2014, as an early 2015 model year vehicle. It competes with other midsized pickup truck offerings.

The North American model features a different front fascia, with its design being similar to the 2014 Chevrolet Silverado (particularly the taillamp lenses, tailgate and rear bumper), and different engines. The North American Colorado's frame is 40% lighter than the global version, it uses high-strength steel, and is much longer. General Motors' Wentzville assembly plant received a $380 million expansion of 500,000 sq ft that was constructed to support the new Colorado's assembly. In September 2014, GM added workers to the Wentzville factory after it received advanced orders of 30,000 Colorado/Canyons from its dealerships.

For the initial launch, the Colorado was available with either a 2.5 L Ecotec I4 engine or the 3.6 L LFX V6 engine. The 2.8 L Duramax LWN turbodiesel engine was added in 2016, and is a first for its class in the US market. It is also available in three cab configurations: extended cab with a 6.2 ft (1.9 m) bed, crew cab with a 5.2 ft (1.6 m) bed, or crew cab with a 6.2 ft (1.9 m) bed, with four-wheel drive being optional.

16-inch or 17-inch steel wheels or alloy wheels are available, as well as a Decor package for the WT model that adds a chrome front grille and body-colored door handles and side-view mirrors.

==== Trim levels ====
- Base trim level (2015–2020)
- WT base trim level ("Work Truck")
- LT mid-level trim and most common
- Z71, the top trim, includes off-road equipment.
- ZR2 for off-road performance is the halo model.

The base Colorado trim level includes as standard equipment: 16-inch steel wheels, vinyl seating surfaces, an A/M-F/M stereo with auxiliary audio input and a six-speaker audio system, power windows and door locks (no keyless entry), a 2.5 L Ecotec I4 gasoline engine, a six-speed manual transmission (until mid-2019, when the manual transmission was discontinued and a six-speed automatic transmission became standard), carpeted flooring, and a chrome front grille. This model is available exclusively as an extended cab.

The W/T includes the same standard equipment as the base Colorado trim level, but has more optional equipment, such as a seven-inch color touch-screen MyLink radio, cloth seating surfaces, keyless entry, 16-inch aluminum-alloy wheels, color-keyed door mirrors, an automatic transmission, and a 3.6 L V6 gasoline engine. It is available as either an extended cab, or as a crew cab with either a short or long box.

The LT adds this equipment to the base Colorado and W/T trim levels: 17-inch aluminum-alloy wheels, 3.6 L V6 gasoline engine, automatic transmission, eight-inch color touch-screen MyLink radio, SiriusXM satellite radio, OnStar with 4G LTE Wi-Fi connectivity (later models only), cloth seating surfaces, and keyless entry. Optional equipment includes a 2.8 L Duramax I4 turbodiesel engine, remote start, a rearview backup camera system, a premium Bose seven-speaker audio system, a GPS navigational radio with MyLink, and chrome exterior accessories. It is available as either an extended cab, or as a crew cab with either a short or long box.

The Z71 is the top-of-the-line trim level, and adds this to the LT trim level: unique aluminum-alloy wheels, vinyl and cloth combination seating surfaces, and a black front grille. Optional equipment is the same as the LT. It is available as either an extended cab, or as a crew cab with either a short or long box.

Later 2015 Colorado and Canyon models offered 4G LTE Wi-Fi capabilities through the OnStar system, standard on higher trim levels, and optional on lower trim levels. For 2016, trucks equipped with the eight-inch MyLink or GMC IntelliLink touchscreen infotainment system received standard Apple CarPlay and Android Auto smartphone integration.

Starting with the 2017 model year, base Colorado and Canyon models received a standard seven-inch Chevrolet MyLink (or GMC Intellilink) touchscreen infotainment system with Bluetooth for hands-free calling and wireless stereo audio streaming, Apple CarPlay and Android Auto smartphone integration, an AM/FM radio, and auxiliary and USB audio inputs, along with a six-speaker audio system. Most models also included a rear backup camera system. OnStar with 4G LTE Wi-Fi capabilities was optional on base Colorado and Canyon models.

The six-speed manual transmission was discontinued during the 2019 model year and is no longer available in the Colorado or Canyon.

Starting with the 2020 model year, both the 4x2 Z71 Extended Cab and Z71 crew-cab long-box models were removed from the lineup, along with the RST and Redline editions, as both will be combined with the luxury edition.

The ZR2 is the "off-road" trim level, and adds to the Z71 trim level: 2-inch taller suspension, 3.5-inch wider track, 31-inch off-road tires, unique aluminum-alloy wheels, leather-trimmed seating surfaces, functional rock sliders, Multimatic DSSV position-sensitive shock absorbers, aluminum skid plates to protect the radiator, oil pan, and front differential, locking front and rear differentials, and high approach-angle front bumper. Optional equipment is the same as the LT and Z71 trim levels, except for the availability of a rear bed-mounted light bar. It is available as either an extended cab with a long box, or as a crew cab with a short box.

The 2021 model year Colorado received a revised appearance and an updated grille in line with the Chevrolet design language, but will see its level trims reduced to four: Work, LT, Z71, and ZR2. The 2WD Base trim was eliminated.

In Mexico, three configurations are available: WT Double Cab, with a 2.5-liter engine, six-speed automatic transmission, and rear wheel drive; the LT Extended Cab, with a 2.5-liter engine, six-speed automatic transmission, and rear-wheel drive; and the LT Extended Cab, with a 3.6-liter V6 engine, eight-speed automatic transmission, connectable transmission, and 4x4.

==== GMC Canyon ====
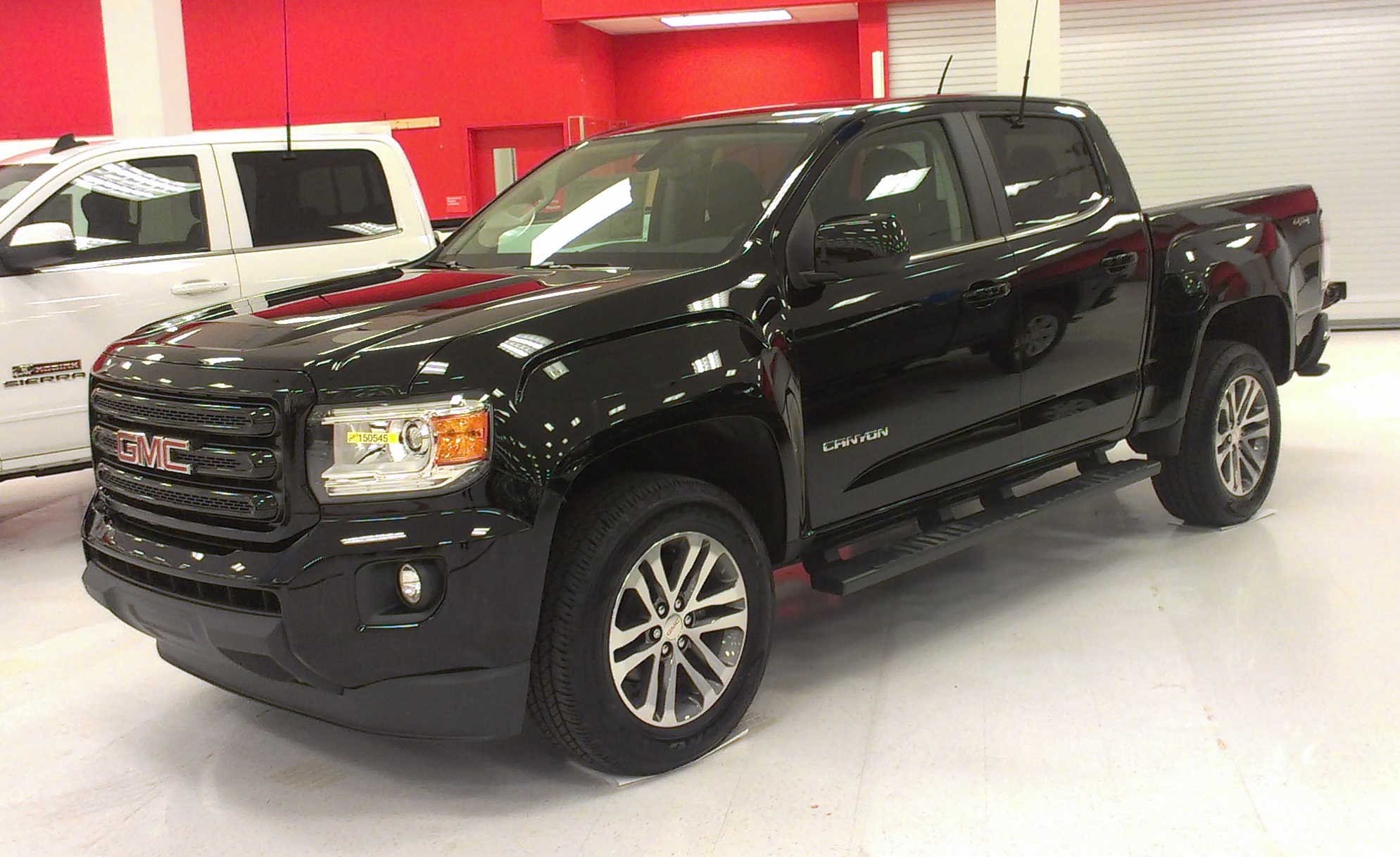
2015 GMC Canyon

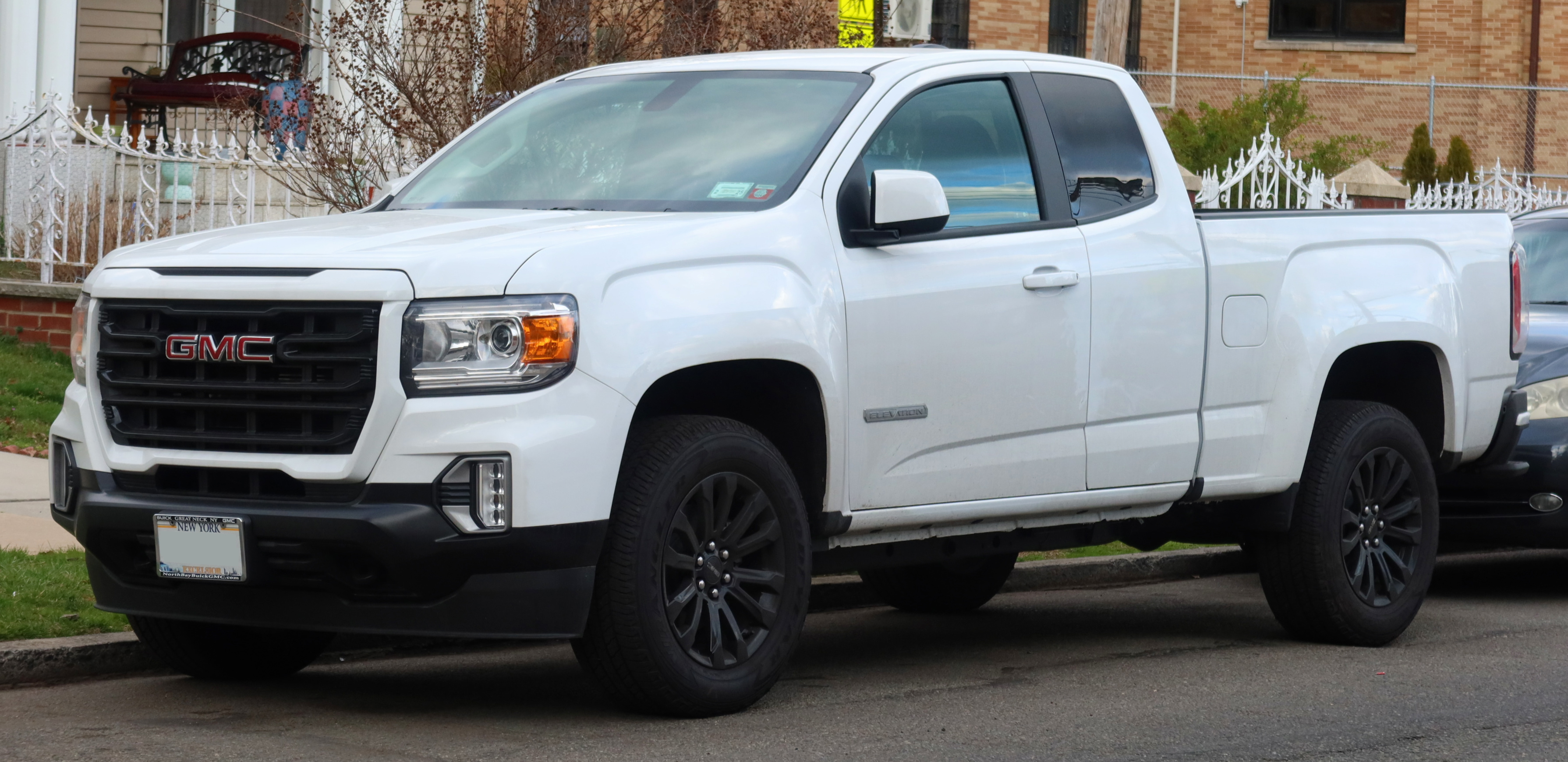
2022 GMC Canyon (facelift)

The all-new GMC Canyon was introduced on January 12, 2014. GMC introduced in an official press and video release and made its public debut the following day (January 13, 2014) at the North American International Auto Show in Detroit. Sales started at dealerships in the second quarter of 2014 as a 2015 model.

The Canyon offers the same features as its cousin, but will have a higher MSRP and more options. It also sports a front grille design that closely resembles its full-size sibling, the GMC Sierra. The Canyon comes in three trims and either two-wheel drive or four-wheel drive. The base model is only available with the 2.5 L Ecotec I4 engine, a 6-speed manual transmission (until mid-2019 when the manual transmission was discontinued and a six-speed automatic transmission became standard), and two-wheel drive.

Optional features (based on trim) will include active aero grille shutters, available OnStar 4G LTE connectivity with on-board Wi-Fi, forward collision warning, lane departure warning, and an available Teen Driver feature that limits speed and audio volume.

On February 16, 2015, GMC posted spy shots of a Canyon with Denali styling, indicating plans to add the mid-size truck to the Denali lineup as a 2016 model.

Both the Canyon and Colorado received a facelift for the 2021 model year, prior to the debut of a third generation in the 2023 model year.

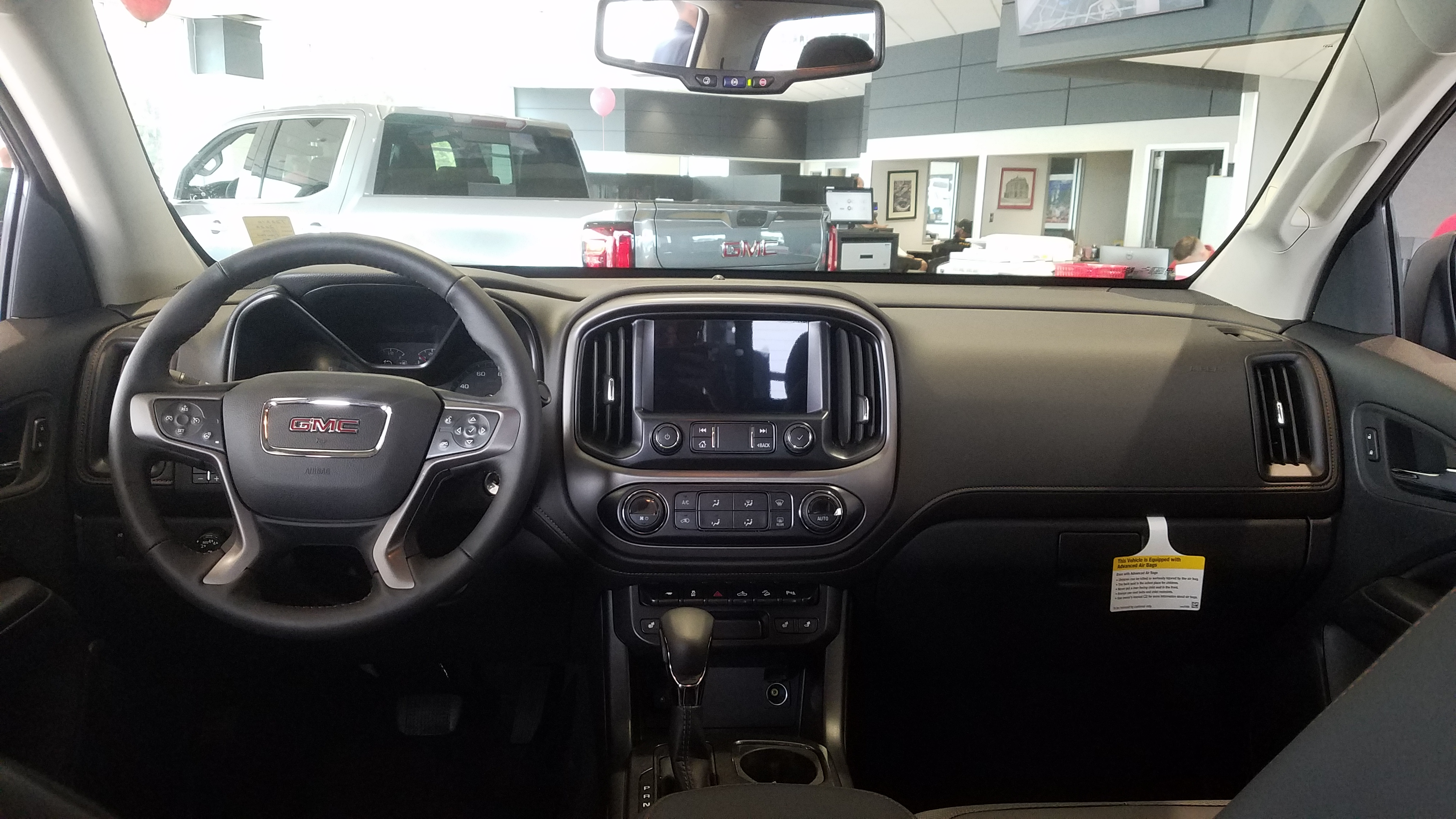
2022 GMC Canyon interior

GMC also saw its level trims reduced and renamed for the 2021 model year: Elevation Standard, Elevation, AT4, and Denali. It is unknown why the SLE and SLT trims were deleted.

==== Colorado ZR2 ====
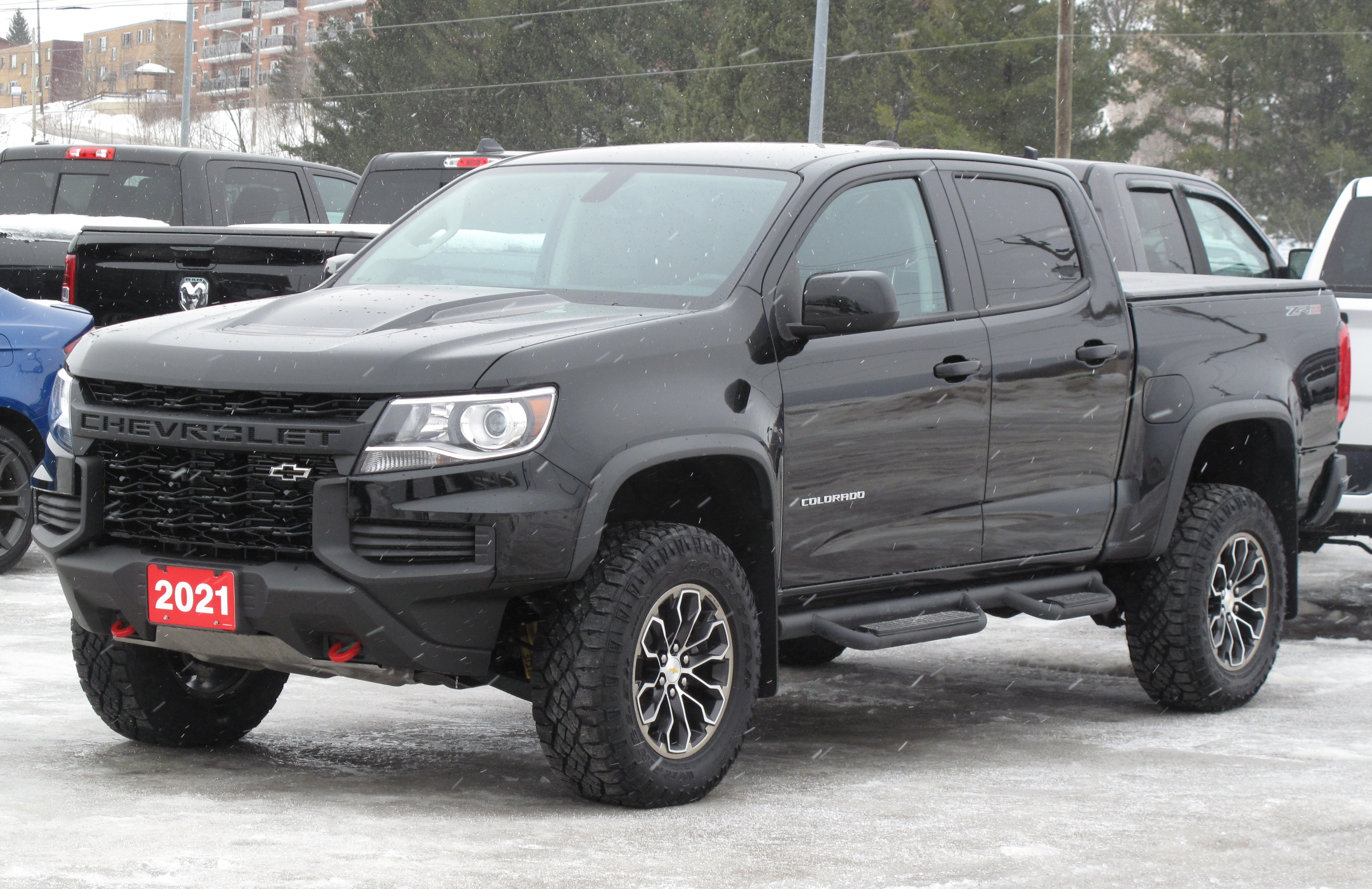
2021 Chevrolet Colorado ZR2

The ZR2 concept was shown at the 2014 LA Auto Show. Due to positive feedback, a production ready version was introduced two years later at the 2016 LA Auto Show, which joined the 2017 lineup.

The Colorado ZR2 offers the same amenities as the Z71, but is heavily tailored towards off-road performance. The ZR2 model is available in 2 body configurations: crew cab with 5 ft bed or extended cab with 6 ft bed. Engine options are the 3.6 L LGZ V6 engine and the 2.8 L Duramax LWN turbodiesel engine.

Chevrolet designed many new parts specifically for the ZR2 to improve off-road performance. New features and parts standard or optional on the ZR2 include:

- 3.5" Wider Track
- 2" Lift
- Multimatic Dynamic Suspension Spool Valve (DSSV) Dampers
- Electronic Locking Front and Rear Differentials
- Longer, Cast Iron Control Arms
- Aggressive Front Bumper and Grille with Improved Approach Angle
- Redesigned Rear Bumper for Improved Departure Angle
- Cowl-Style Hood with Black Insert
- Wider Fender Flares
- Aluminum Skid Plates to protect radiator, oil pan, and front differential
- Rock Sliders
- New 17x8 Wheels with 31" (265/65R17) Goodyear Wrangler Duratrac tires
- "Off-road Mode" alters throttle progression, shift calibration, traction control, stability control, and ABS for different terrain.
- Optional Bed-Mounted Full Size Spare Tire
- Optional Carpet Delete

The 2018 Colorado ZR2 was featured in Season 9 Episode 99 of Motor Trend Head 2 Head, where it faced off against a 2017 Ram 2500 Power Wagon.

==== Colorado ZH2 (Military Truck) ====
GM Defense and U.S. Army TARDEC partnered in 2016 to develop and successfully test the Chevrolet Colorado ZH2 fuel cell electric truck, with low acoustical and heat signatures as well as the advantages of on-board water production, exportable electric power and off-road capability.

==== Infantry Squad Vehicle ====
The US Army's Infantry Squad Vehicle (ISV) is heavily based on the diesel variant of the ZR2, with 90% of the vehicle coming from Commercial Off-The-Shelf (COTS) components.

=== Engines ===
Years	Engine	Power	Torque	Transmission	Note
2012–2016	2.4 L Flexpower I4				Brazil
2012–2013	2.5 L Duramax I4	122 kW (164 hp; 166 PS)	280 lb⋅ft (380 N⋅m)	5-speed manual only	
2012–present	2.8 L Duramax LWN I4	135–147 kW (181–197 hp; 184–200 PS)	347–369 lb⋅ft (470–500 N⋅m)	6-speed 6L50 automatic	US 2016
2015–present	2.5 L Ecotec I4	149 kW (200 hp; 203 PS)	191 lb⋅ft (259 N⋅m)		US, Mexico & Brazil
2015–2016	3.6 L LFX V6	227 kW (304 hp; 309 PS)	269 lb⋅ft (365 N⋅m)		US
2017–present	3.6 L LGZ V6	230 kW (308 hp; 313 PS)	275 lb⋅ft (373 N⋅m)		US & Mexico
2016–present	2.8 L VM Motori I4 turbo-diesel	138–147 kW (185–197 hp; 188–200 PS)	369 lb⋅ft (500 N⋅m)	6-speed 6L50 automatic	Thai production
2016–present	2.5 L Duramax LKH I4 Turbo	122 kW (164 hp; 166 PS)	280 lb⋅ft (380 N⋅m)		Thai production
2016–present	2.5 L Duramax XLDE25 LP2 I4 VG Turbo	134 kW (180 hp; 182 PS)	324 lb⋅ft (439 N⋅m)		Thai production

== Third generation (2023) ==
Third generation
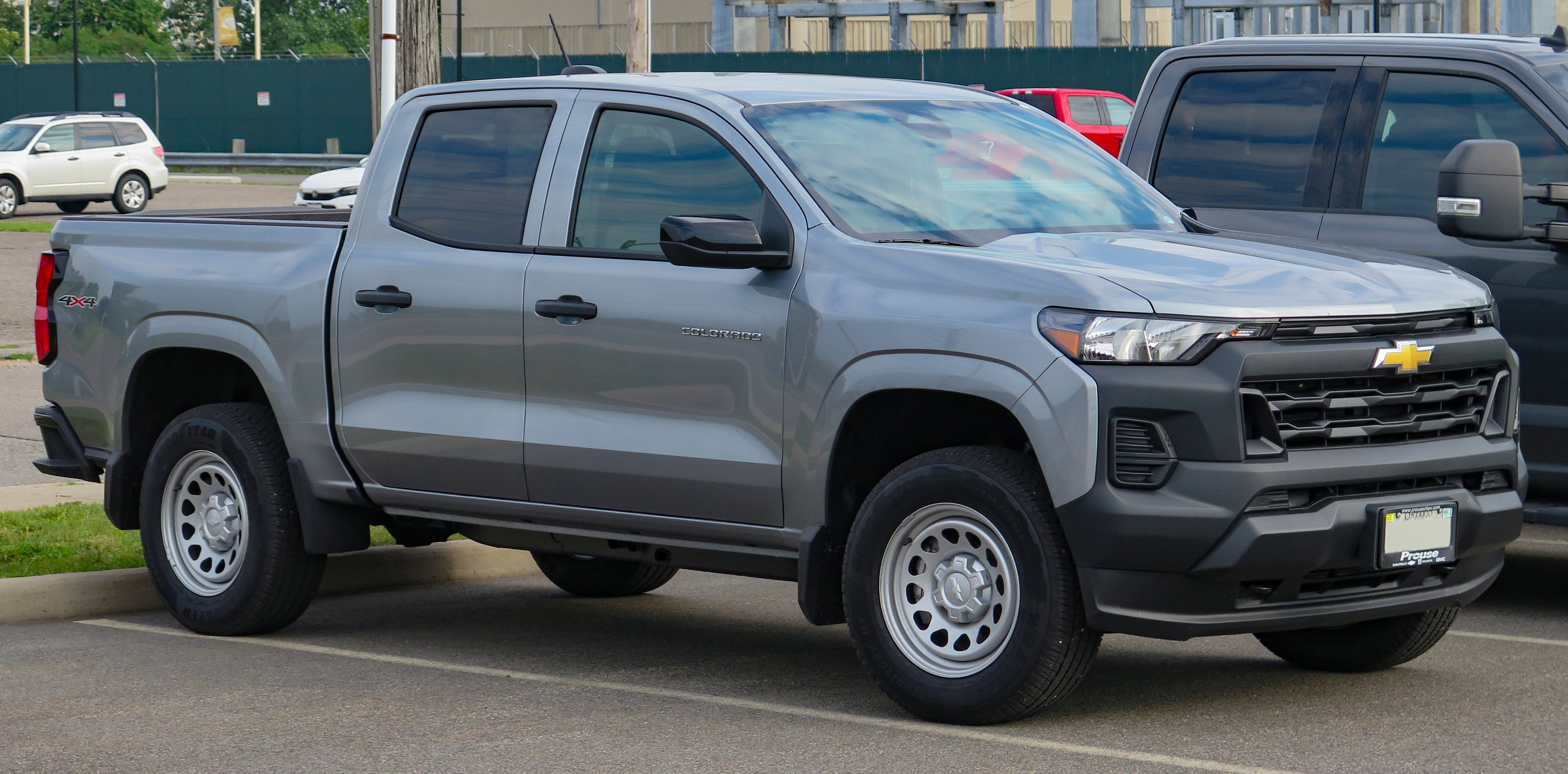
- 2023 Chevrolet Colorado WT (Canada)

Overview
- Also called: GMC Canyon
- Production: January 2023–present
- Model years: 2023–present (US and Canada); 2024–2026 (South Korea); 2024–present (Middle East, GMC Canyon); 2026–present (South Korea, GMC Canyon)
- Assembly: United States: Wentzville, Missouri (Wentzville Assembly)

Body and chassis
- Platform: GM VSS-T (31XX-2)
- Related: Chevrolet Silverado

Powertrain
- Engine: Gasoline: 2.7 L L2R turbo I4; 2.7 L L3B turbo I4
- Transmission: 8-speed 8L80 automatic

Dimensions
- Wheelbase: 3,337 mm (131.4 in)
- Length: 5,402–5,410 mm (212.7–213.0 in)
- Width: 1,902 mm (74.9 in); 2,143 mm (84.4 in) (with mirrors)
- Height: 2,001–2,080 mm (78.8–81.9 in)
- Curb weight: 4,716–5,298 lb (2,139–2,403 kg)

The third-generation Colorado and Canyon debuted in July 2022 for the 2023 model year. The new model is available only with a Crew Cab and a single bed length. The only engine is the turbocharged 2.7-liter four first introduced on the larger Silverado; it was initially offered in three levels of power: 237 hp (177 kW) and 259 lb⋅ft (351 N⋅m) in the L2R engine used on the Work Truck (WT) and LT models, 310 hp (231 kW) and 390 lb⋅ft (529 N⋅m) as an option (standard on Z71 and Trail Boss). The top model (Colorado ZR2/Canyon AT4) had the same power but with 390 lb⋅ft (529 N⋅m) of torque. The lower torque rating of the middle version, called "Turbo Plus", was the result of a chip detune; it was only available for the 2023 model year.

Despite being a mid-size, in some dimensions it is somewhat bigger than the full-size Silverado, being built around the same chassis and frame while sharing the same L3B engine.

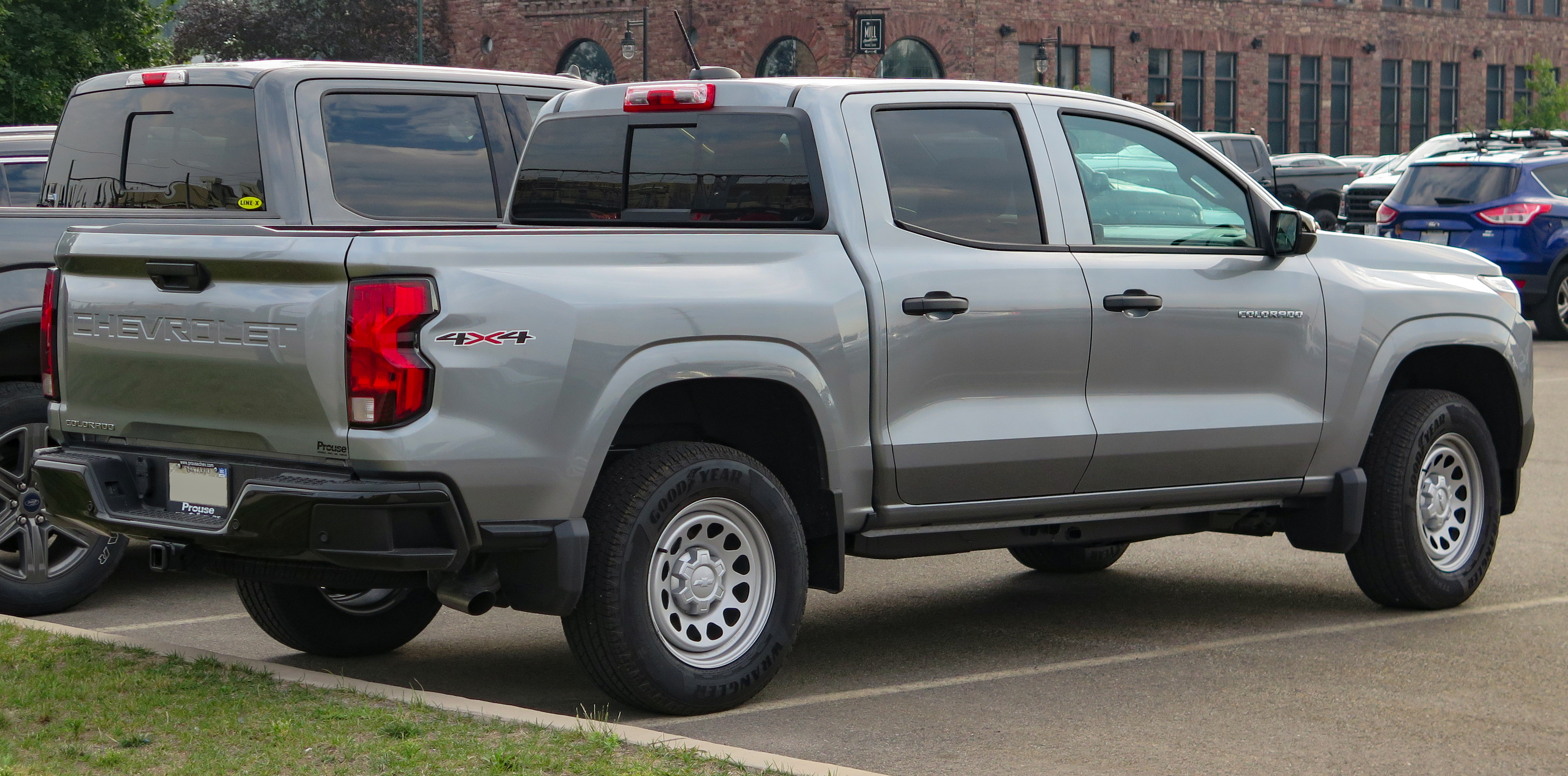
Rear view (Colorado)

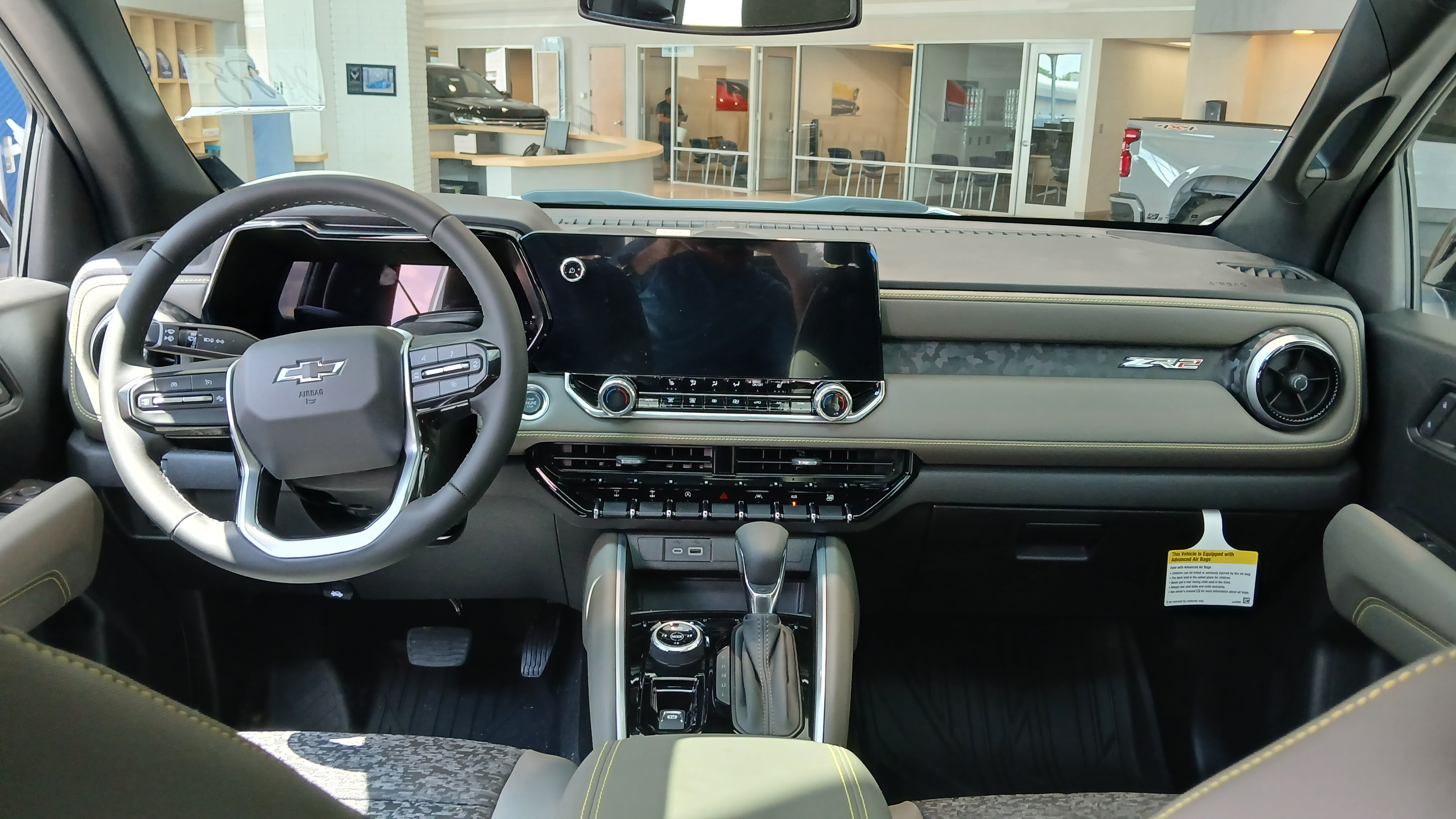
Interior (Colorado)

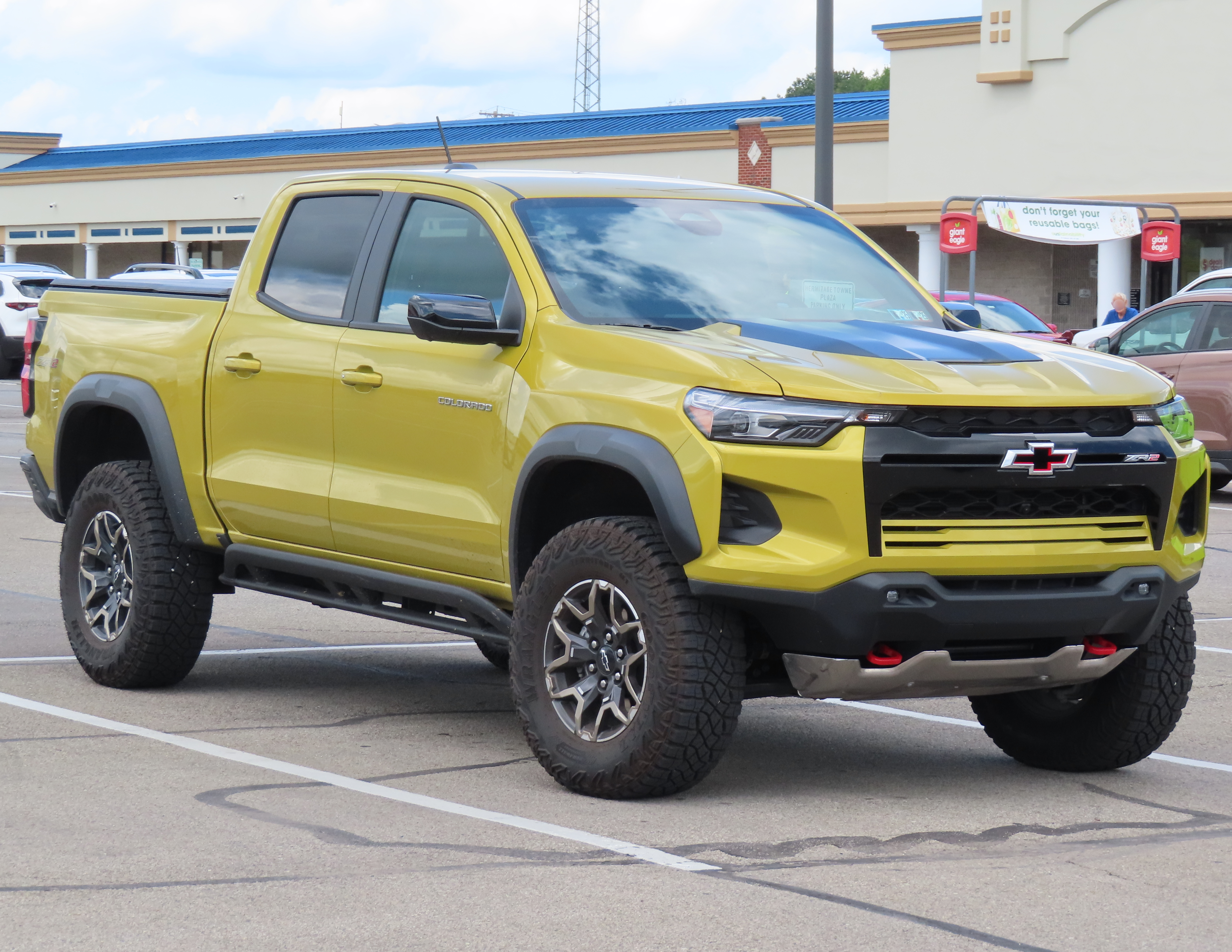
2024 Colorado ZR2

2023 GMC Canyon AT4

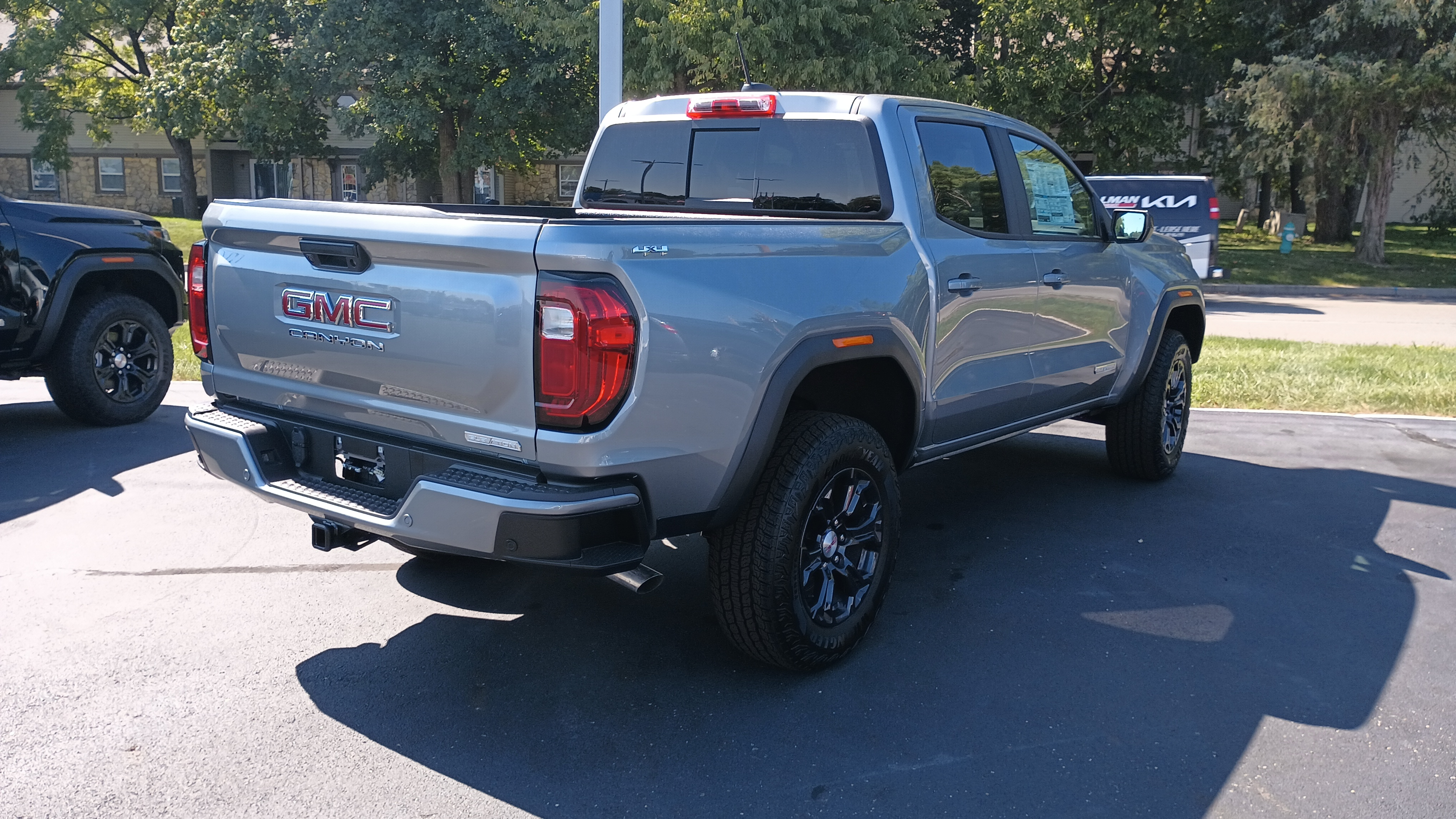
Rear view (Canyon)

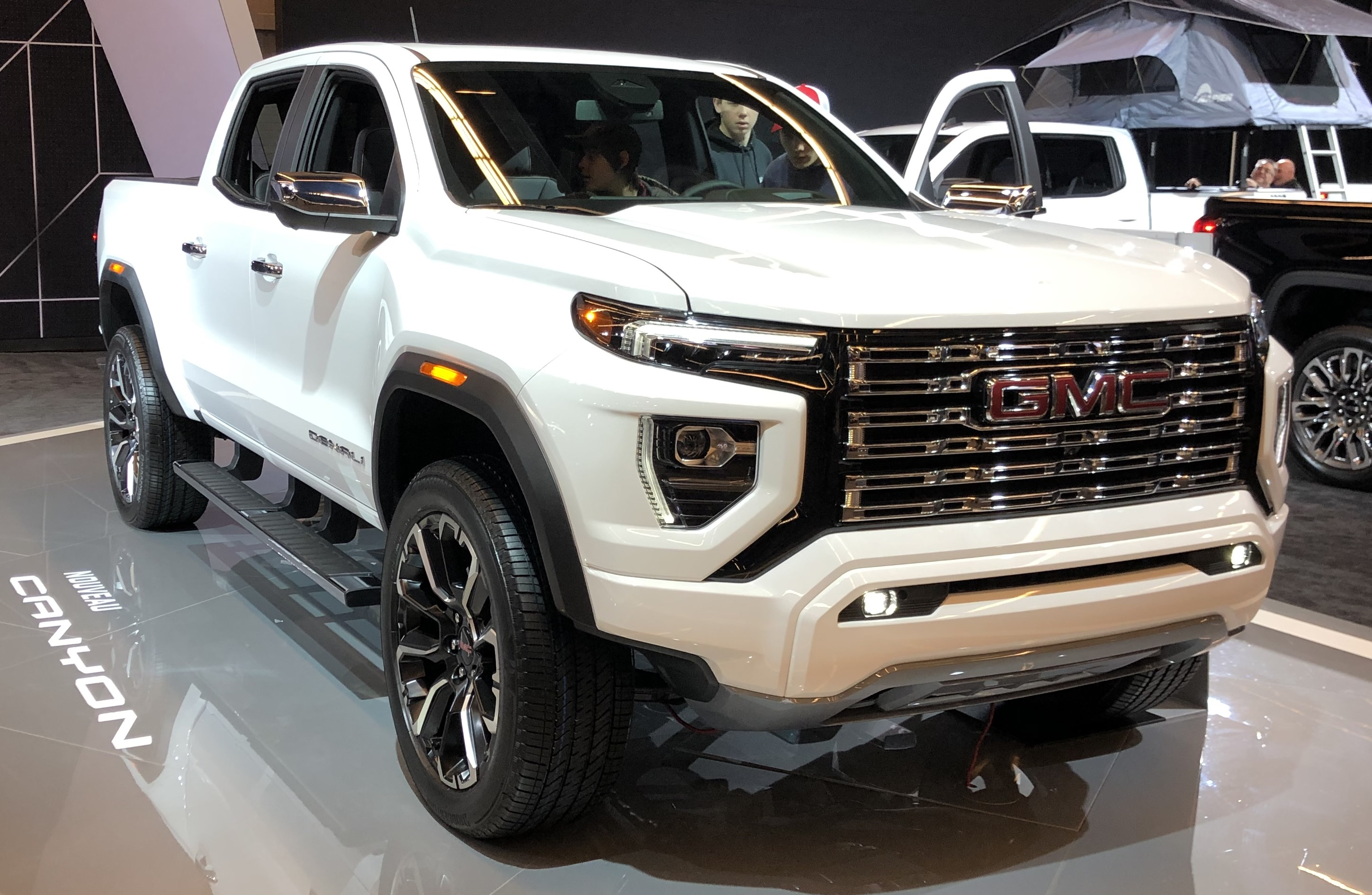
2023 Canyon Denali

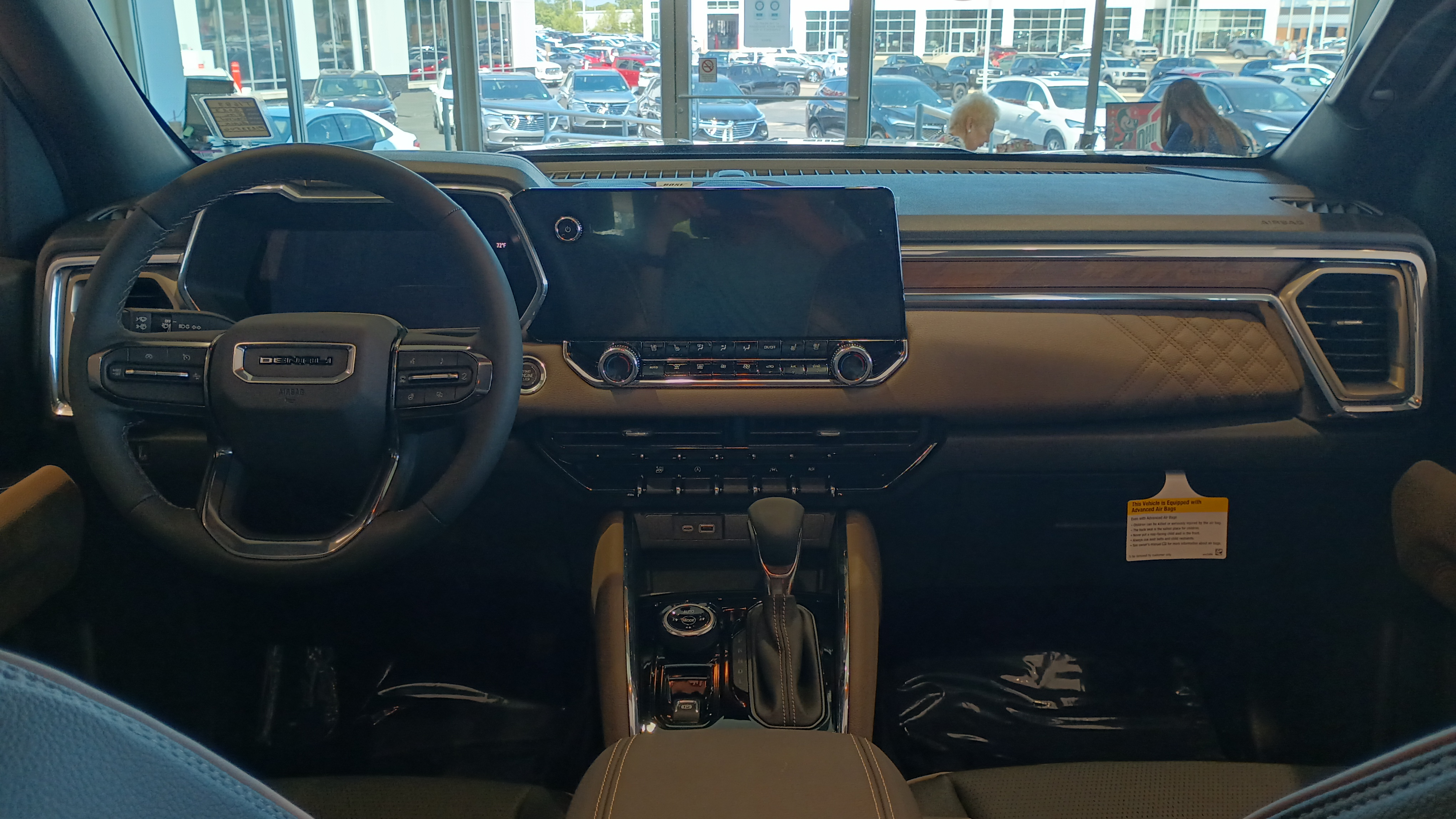
Interior (Canyon Denali)

== Sales ==
Calendar year	United States		Canada		Thailand
Calendar year	Colorado	Canyon	Colorado	Canyon	Thailand
2004	117,475	27,193			
2005	128,359	34,845			
2006	93,876	23,979			
2007	75,716	20,888			
2008	54,346	14,974			
2009	32,413	10,107			
2010	24,642	7,992			
2011	31,026	9,590			
2012	36,840	8,735			
2013	3,412	929			
2014	8,003	3,070	274	294	12,806
2015	84,430	30,077	5,095	4,635	11,631
2016	108,725	37,449	6,569	6,083	12,844
2017	112,996	32,106	8,060	6,260	16,950
2018	134,842	33,492	9,489	6,902	18,022
2019	122,304	32,825	8,156	4,889	11,540
2020	96,238	25,190	6,648	5,031	2,694
2021	73,008	24,125	5,571	4,866	404
2022	89,157	27,819	7,009	5,587	
2023	71,018	22,458	6,088	3,750	
2024	98,012	38,215	8,138	6,781	
2025	107,867	36,477	8,873	7,119	

== Awards and recognition ==
- Motor Trend's 2015 Truck of the Year
- Motor Trend's 2016 Truck of the Year
- Four Wheeler 2018 Pickup Truck of the Year (Colorado ZR2)
- Motor Trend's 2024 Truck of the Year
