= Nerf bar =

Tubular step fitted to a truck or SUV

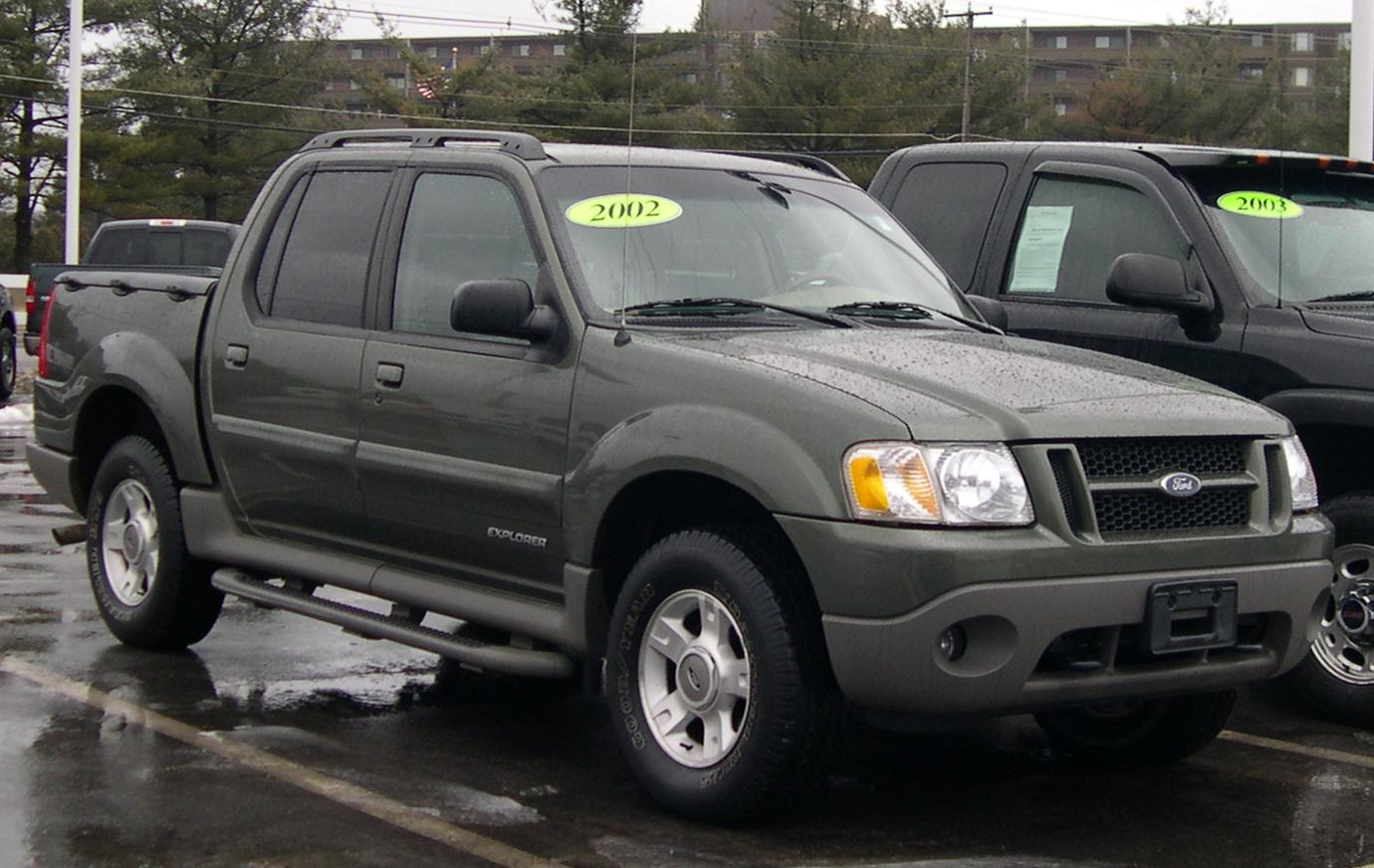
A 2002 Ford Explorer Sport Trac with a black nerf bar hanging from the body.

A nerf bar is a tubular device fitted to the side of a racecar, typically single-seat race cars that compete on asphalt or dirt oval tracks. A "nerf" is a small, sometimes intentional, collision between two cars in which one driver bumps the other to facilitate a successful pass.

== Overview ==
The nerf bar protects the sides of the vehicles and also keeps their tires from becoming entangled. If fast-spinning tires come in contact with each other, one or both of the cars may lose control or even become airborne. These are commonly used on Modifieds such as used in the NASCAR Whelen Modified Series, and the wheel pods behind the rear wheels on a Dallara DW12 INDYCAR is often nicknamed the nerf bar because of the similar purpose.

A more commercial application of the nerf bar is for convenience purposes on a pickup truck or sport utility vehicle. It may act as a step to ease entry and exit from the vehicle, or to help prevent damage to the vehicle when crossing rocks off-road. Nerf bars can also be used to double as side bull bars on off-road vehicles.

The term is sometimes applied to the foot-rests on a motorcycle. Nerf bars are typically made from either stainless steel, chrome or powder-coated steel, although there are considerable variations in style and design. For motorcycle tank/engine protection systems on dual sport motorcycles, the term "P.D. Nerf" was invented by Happy Trails Products for the Kawasaki KLR 650. On quad bikes nerf bars are used to help stop the wheels of two machines becoming entangled.

They are also variously known as step bars, boss bars, tube steps, step rails, truck steps, or step tubes.

The most common types of nerf bars are: cab length step bars, wheel-to-wheel nerf bars, oval tube steps, sport tubes and single steps. The installation is common for all nerf bars and includes universal or model specific brackets. Brackets are attached either to rocker panels or bolt on directly to the frame of a vehicle. Some model specific brackets for nerf bars do not require drilling and use existing mounting holes in the frame of a vehicle.

Typically if they are being used to slide over rocks and past trees they are built with thicker tubing and attached directly to the truck's frame rails rather than the body. Being attached to the frame can allow them to support the entire weight of the vehicle and even be used as a jack point to change a tire. They are not called Nerf Bars any more and instead are called Sliders, Rock Bars, or another variation of the two.

== Hot rod application of the nerf bar ==
The hot rod world will sometimes use a much smaller version of a racing nerf bar. It may be only about 6 inches tall and utilized in the front and rear of a hot rod in place of the traditional bumper. The hot rod nerf bar is attached to the ends of the frame rails and typically chromed. Hot rod nerf bars provide little protection and typically do not qualify as a bumper in most states.
