= Flitch =

Flitch can refer to the following things:

- Flitch (wood), a piece of wood for resawing into smaller pieces
- Flitch (bacon), a side of unsliced bacon
- The flitch trials of Great Dunmow
- Flitch beam a beam consisting of a metal (steel) plate sandwiched between two boards.
