= Deronda Type F =

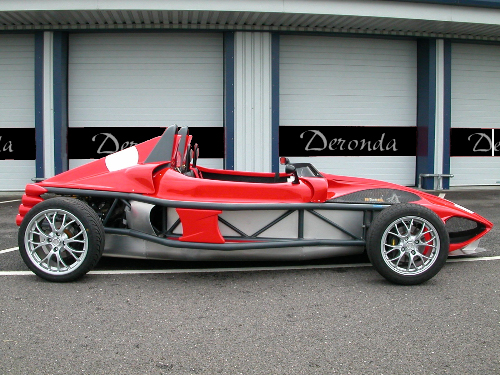

Overview
- Manufacturer: Deronda Ltd / Alternative Cars Ltd
- Production: 2004 onwards
- Designer: Andy Round / Mark Taylor

Body and chassis
- Body style: Exoskeleton car

Powertrain
- Engine: 1.8 L (1800cc) turbocharged Audi inline-four
- Transmission: Audi 5-speed manual transaxle

Dimensions
- Curb weight: 600 kg

Chronology
- Predecessor: none
- Successor: Type G

The Deronda Type F is a road going, track day car.

When former airline executive, Andy Round, wanted to create a performance car he contracted Racing Designs Ltd, of Buckingham, and sister company Fabrication Techniques Ltd to design and build the Deronda Type F.

== Specifications ==
Racing Designs boss, Mark Taylor, came up with an exoskeleton car featuring a space frame chassis with wishbone suspension at each corner and push-rod operated coil-over dampers. An Audi turbocharged 1800cc 4-cylinder engine is mounted longitudinally behind the cockpit to achieve better weight distribution. The engine is mated with an Audi 5-speed transaxle gearbox, as used in the Audi A4 and Audi A6.

== Production ==
The first prototype was completed in 2003 and was debuted at the Autosport International show in January 2004. This car was fitted with a Cosworth Technology tuned engine that produced 300 bhp (224 kW). A second car was built, SVA tested and registered for use on the road. This car was later exported to the United States, where Sirius Motosports Inc have licensed the rights to the Deronda. Sirius Motorsports subsequently developed the Deronda Type G, which uses the LS2 V8. However, health problems prevented Andy from progressing with the Type F in the United Kingdom until April 2009 when an agreement was reached with Alternative Cars Ltd, manufacturer of Midas Cars.

== Gallery ==
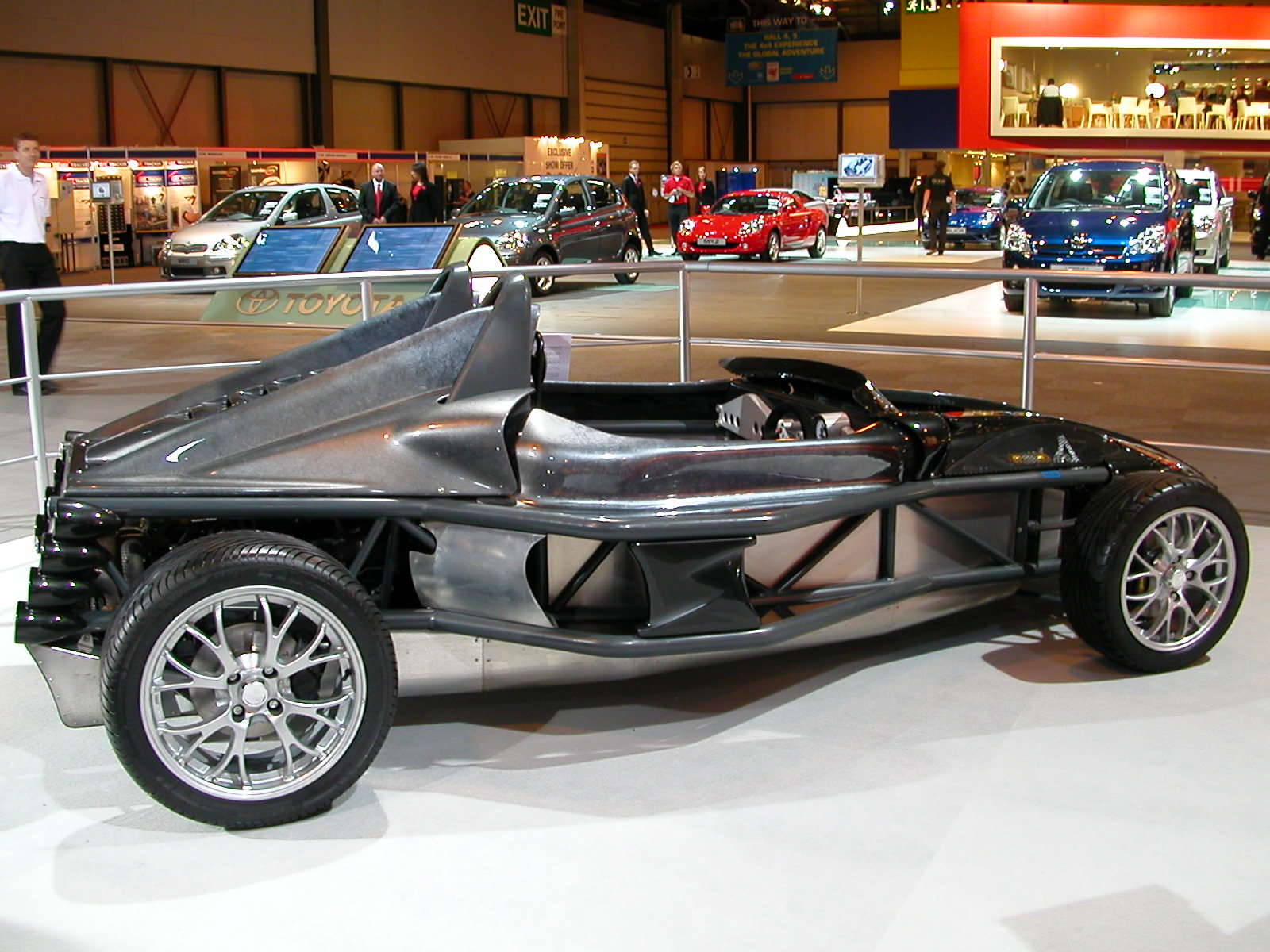
The Deronda Type F at The 2004 Motor Show

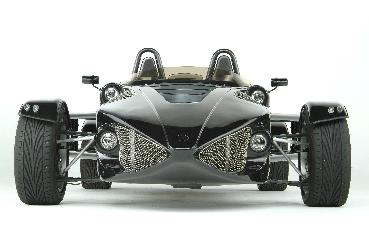
Deronda Type F

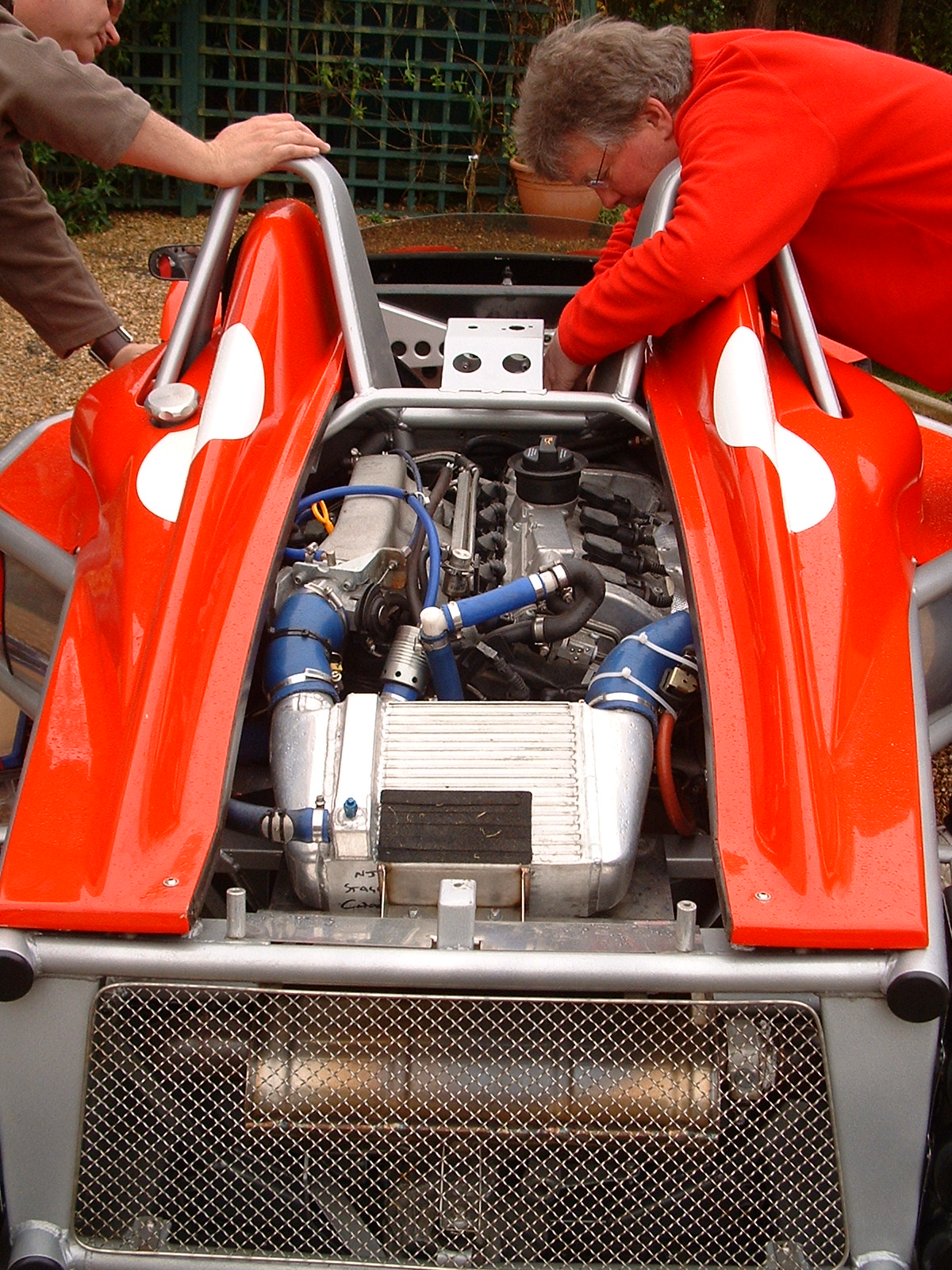
Audi 1800cc turbo in a Deronda Type F

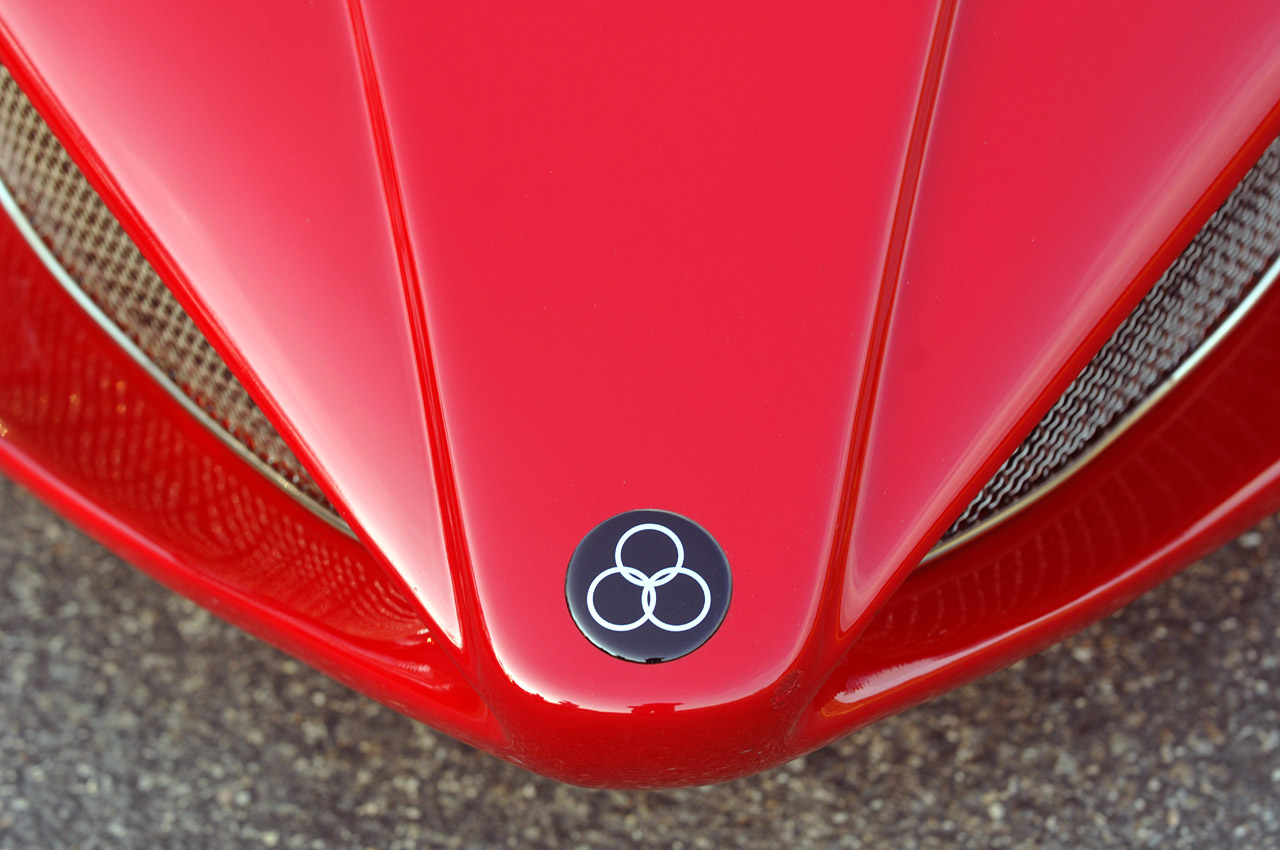
Nose cone of the Deronda Type F

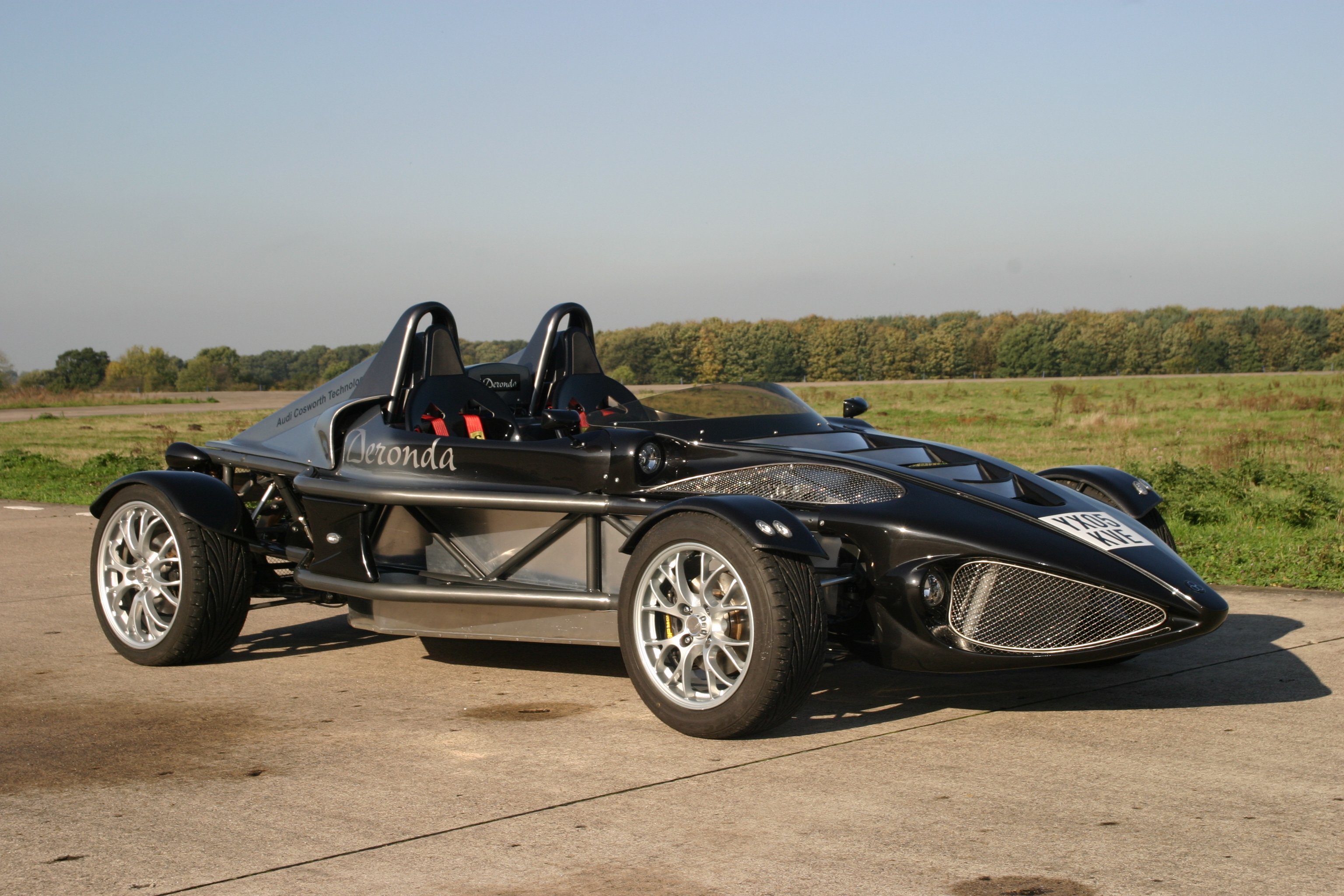
Deronda Type F in road going format

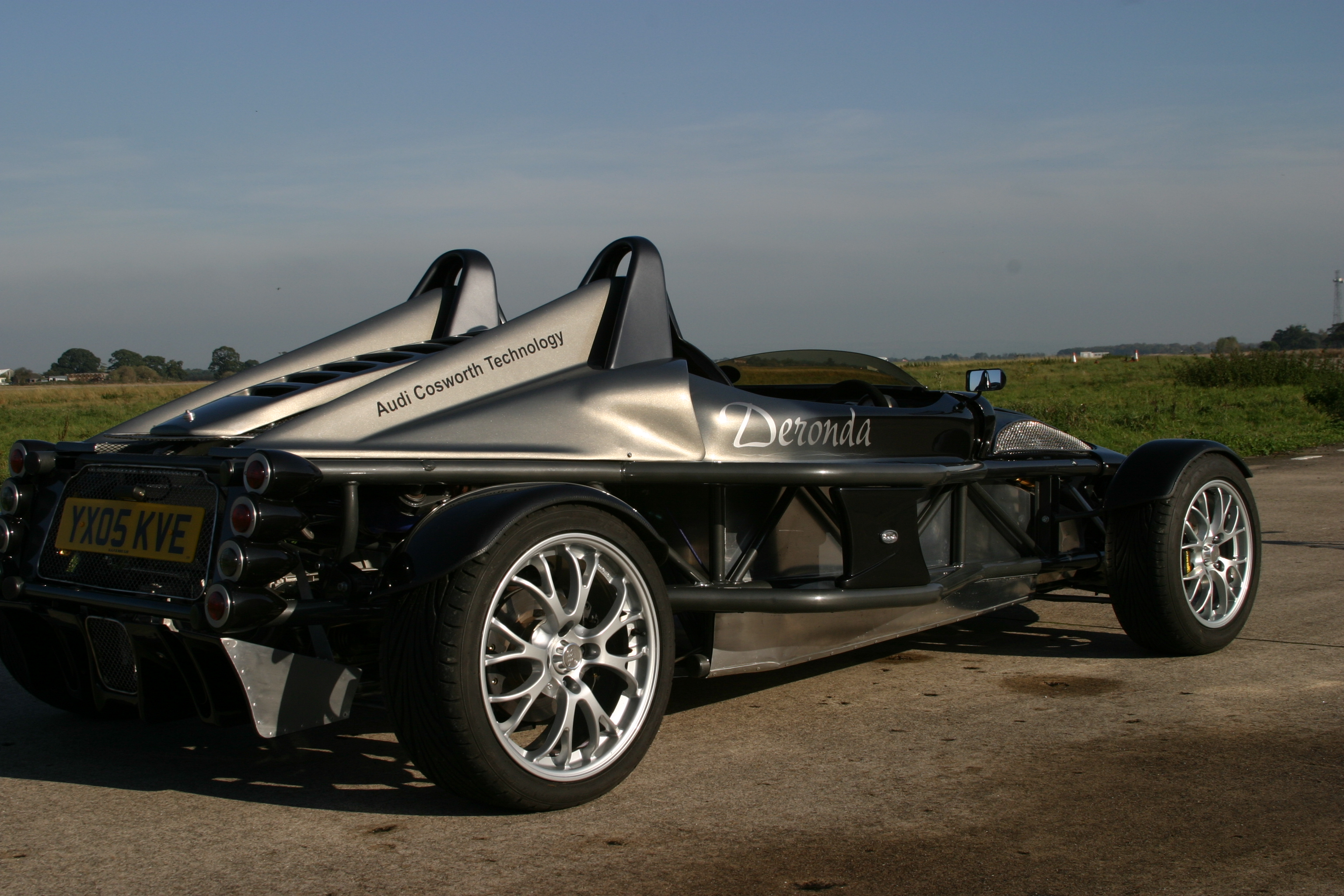
Rear view of Deronda Type F

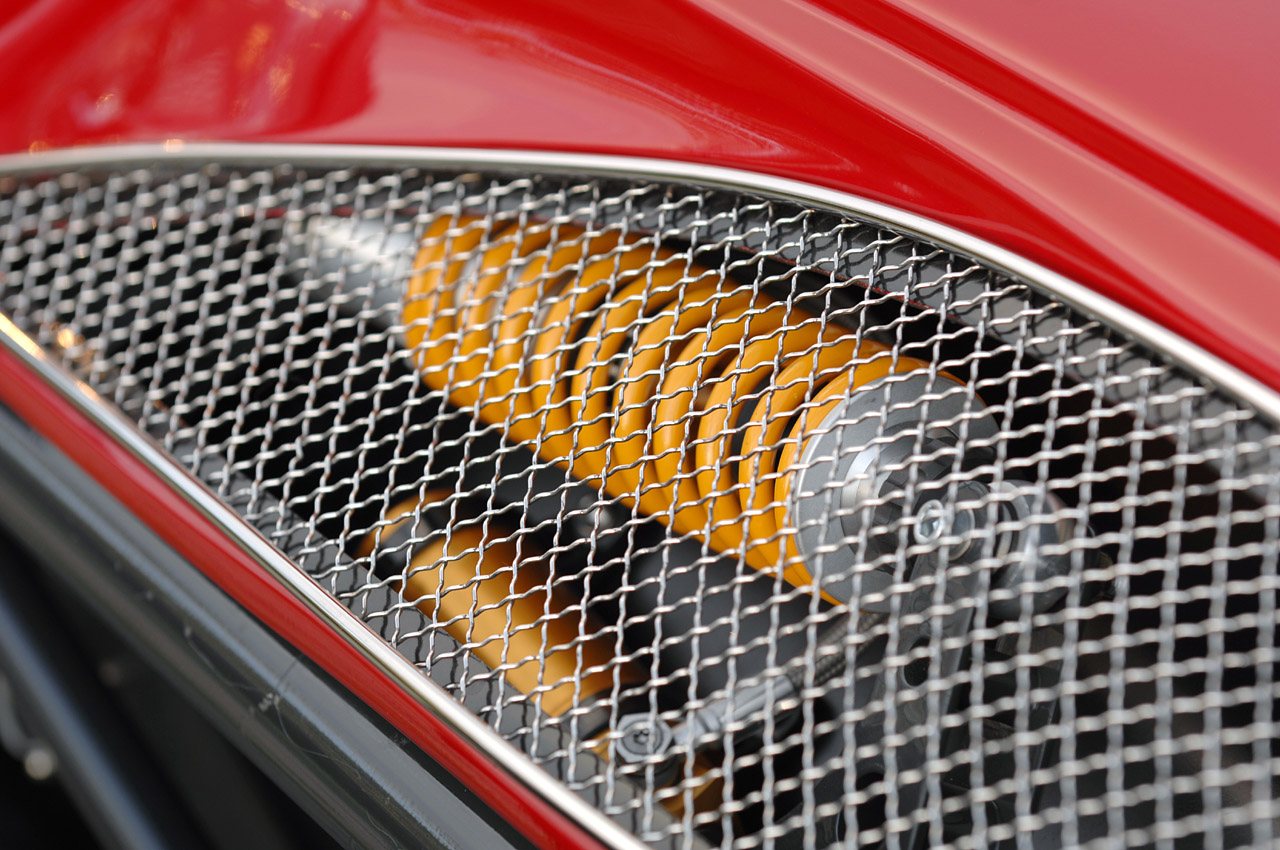
Coilover dampers operated by pushrods

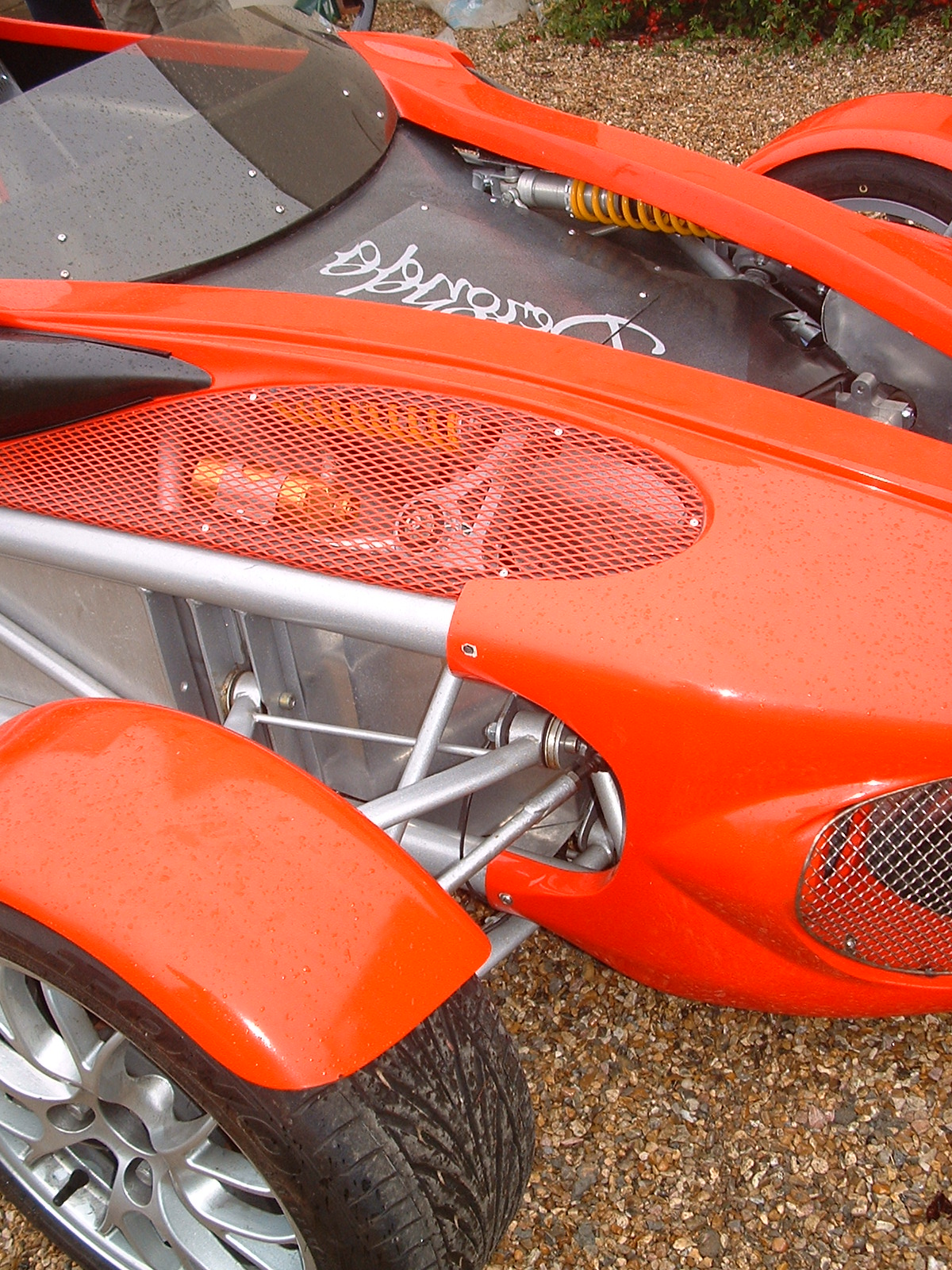
Deronda front suspension

== Related models ==
- Deronda G400, slightly longer version with V-8 from a Chevrolet Corvette sold in the United States under this name.

== See also ==
- Exoskeleton cars
