= Exoskeleton car =

Car with a visible external frame made of steel, aluminum or carbon fiber tubes

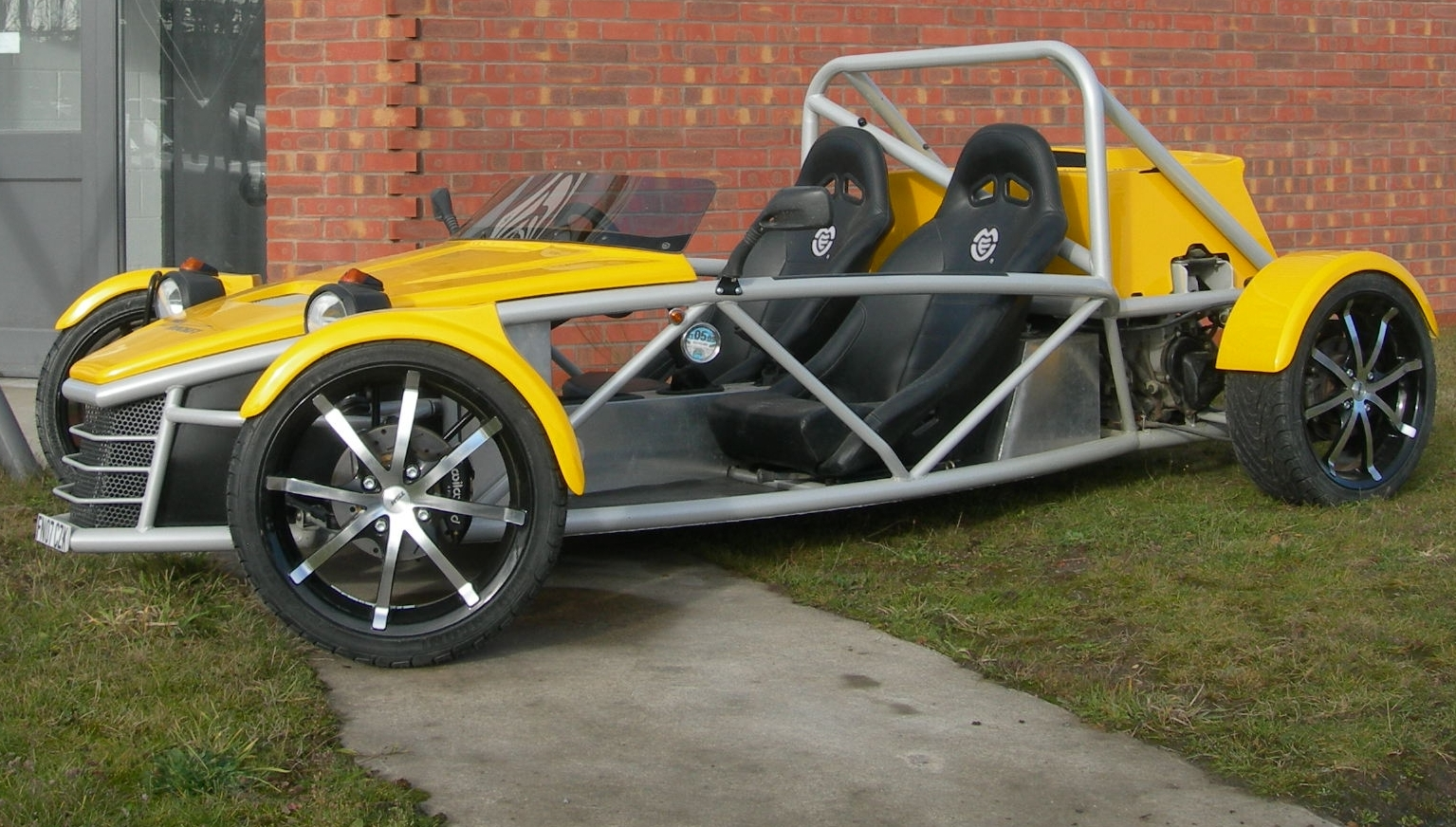
MEV Rocket

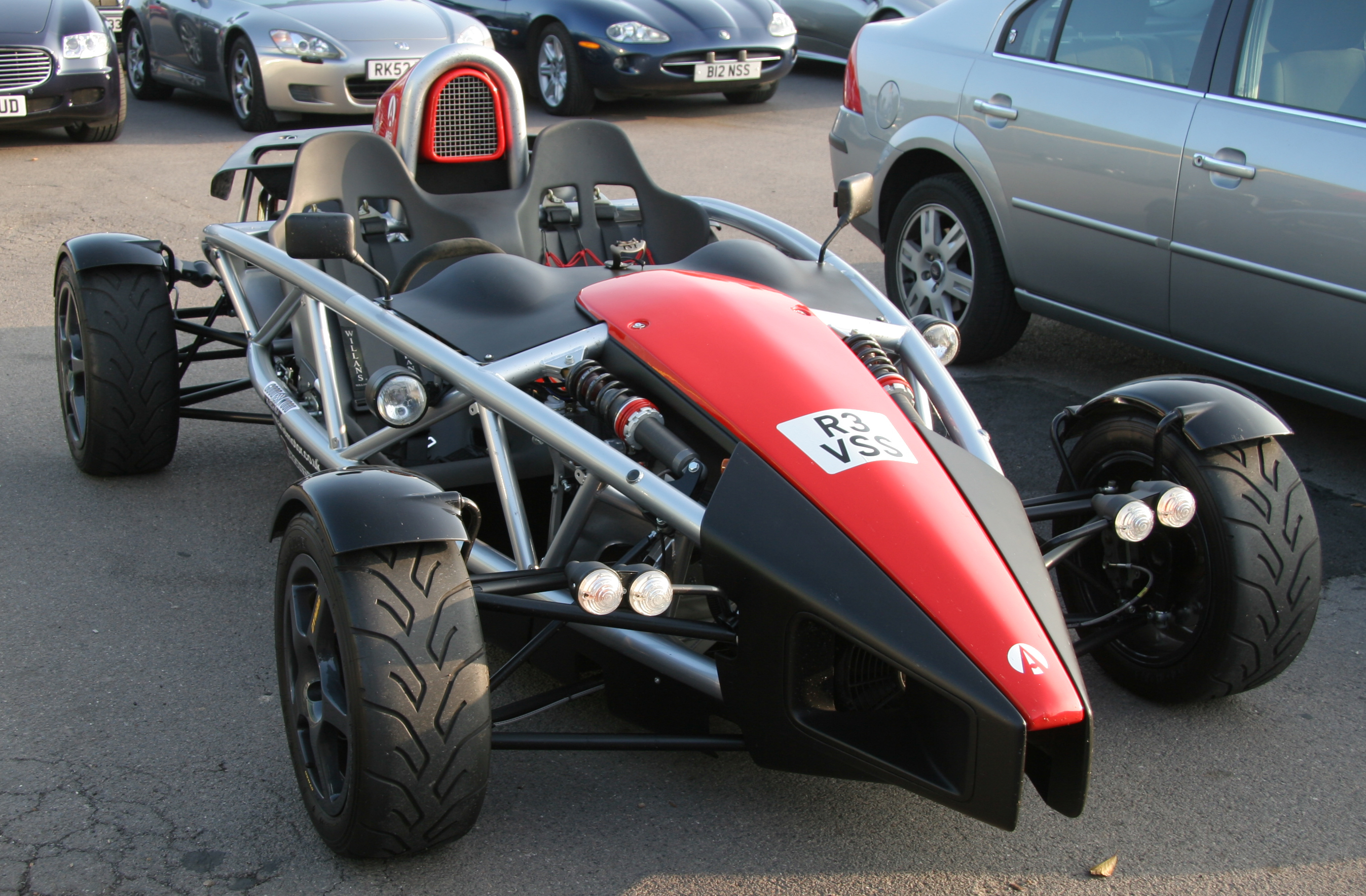
Ariel Atom

Exoskeleton car (also known as an exoskeletal car) is a type of automobile whose structural frame is exposed. They are typically made of steel, aluminum or carbon fiber tubes. The body styles are open-wheel sports cars, with wheels mounted outside of the main body, each covered by its own lightweight mudguard, usually carried as unsprung weight supported on the hub carrier. The chassis generally consists of four longitudinal tubes, two on each side, inboard of the wheels. These main chassis tubes are reinforced by smaller diagonal or vertical tubes.

== Design and construction ==
Structurally, an exoskeleton chassis lies between a ladder chassis and a space frame chassis. The basic form consists of two ladder chassis, one above the other. The classic ladder chassis is stiff against sideways forces, but weak against vertical bending forces. By using paired longitudinal tubes separated vertically, the exoskeletal frame gains greater stiffness under vertical bending loads. Unlike a true space-frame, however, the principal loads here are bending, not pure tension or compression.

A drawback to the exoskeleton is that doors cannot be cut through the upper suspension tubes. The car style is thus restricted to low-slung cars, or those with rear or front entry.

Construction follows Colin Chapman's philosophy of maximizing the power-to-weight ratio by minimizing weight rather than simply adding power. Early monocoque racing cars such as the Lotus 25 had exposed chassis, but the term exoskeletal is more typically reserved for vehicles with an exposed space frame, such as sandrails, dune buggies or specialized light weight track cars.

== Notable examples ==
Examples of exoskeleton cars include the Deronda Type F, produced from 2004, which uses a space-frame chassis and features open suspension and high power-to-weight. The British firm Mills Extreme Vehicles marketed exoskeletal models such as the MEV Rocket, described as a budget response to the Ariel Atom and credited with helping establish the genre.

== Evaluation ==
The exposed frame design allows large longitudinal tubes which increase stiffness, while overall vehicle weight is reduced, thereby enhancing performance via an improved power-to-weight ratio.

The lack of conventional bodywork limits weather protection, comfort and practicality. The high sills and open-wheel layout make ingress/egress more difficult. Also, the upper-frame layout restricts door design and mass-production practicality.

== See also ==
- Vehicle frame
- Dune buggy
- Space frame (vehicle chassis)
- Body-on-frame
- Trophy truck
