= Isuzu MU-X =

Mid-size SUV produced by Isuzu

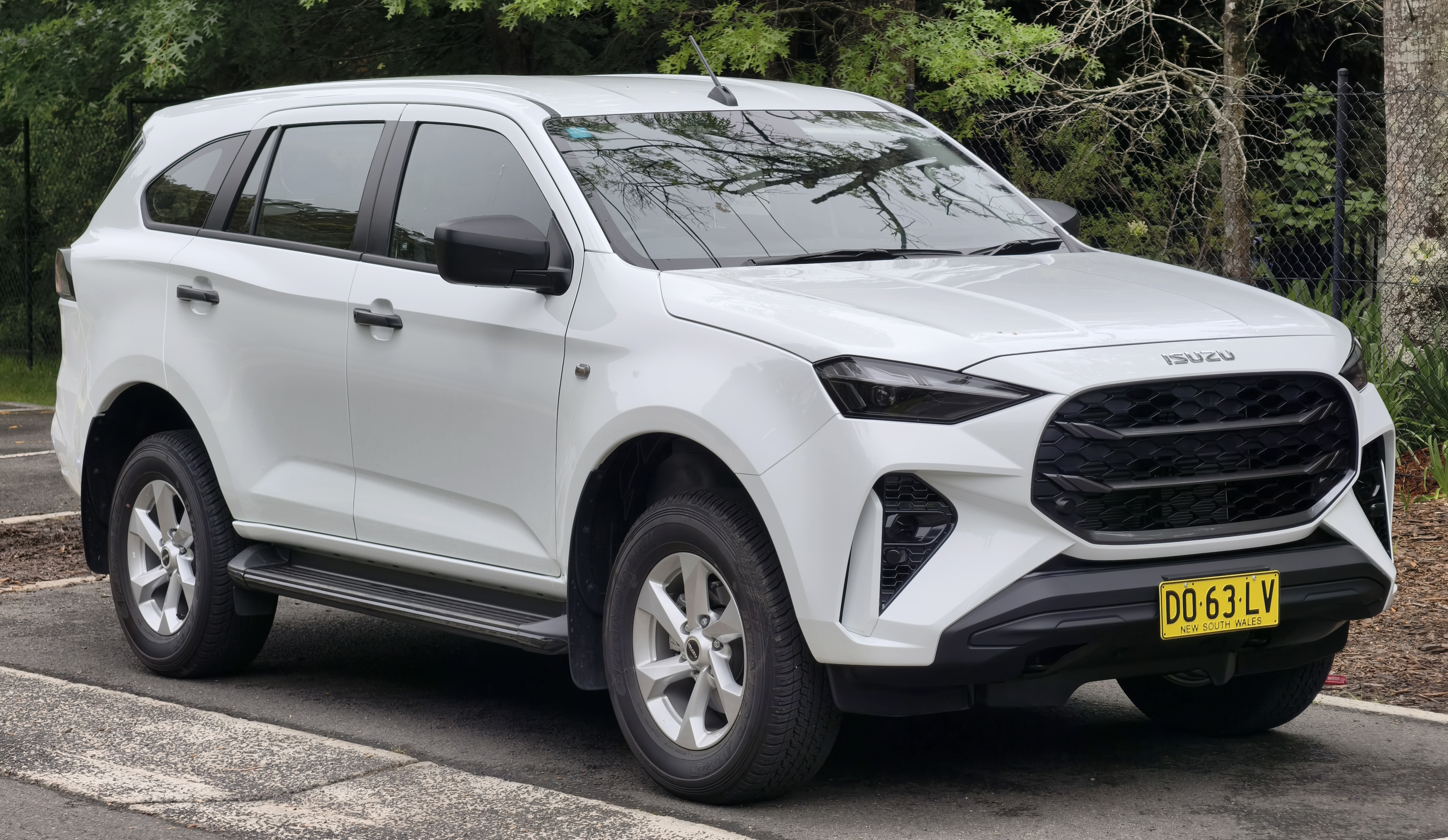
- Second generation MU-X (facelift)

Overview
- Manufacturer: Isuzu
- Production: 2013–present

Body and chassis
- Class: Mid-size SUV
- Body style: 5-door SUV
- Layout: Front-engine, rear-wheel drive; Front-engine, four-wheel drive
- Chassis: Body-on-frame
- Related: Isuzu D-Max

Chronology
- Predecessor: Isuzu MU-7; Isuzu Panther (Indonesia)

The Isuzu MU-X is a mid-size SUV produced by Isuzu. It is a body-on-frame SUV based on the D-Max pickup truck, and the successor to the MU-7.

The name "MU-X" stands for "Multi Utility – eXtreme".

== Predecessor: Isuzu MU-7 (510; 2004) ==
Isuzu MU-7
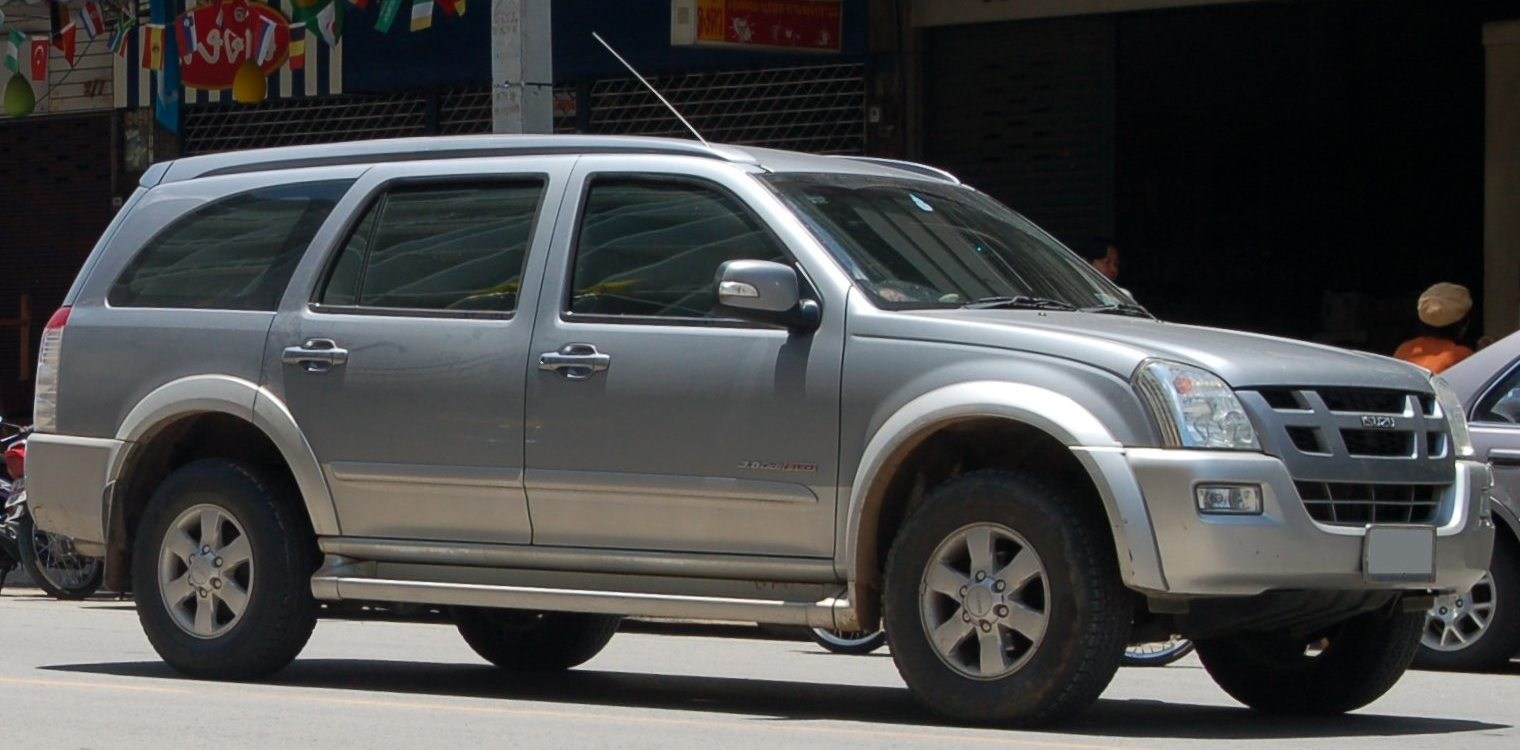

Overview
- Model code: 510
- Also called: Isuzu Alterra (Philippines)
- Production: 2004–2013
- Assembly: Thailand: Samut Prakan (Isuzu Motors Thailand); Philippines: Biñan, Laguna (Isuzu Philippines)

Body and chassis
- Chassis: Body-on-frame

Powertrain
- Engine: Diesel: 3.0 L 4JJ1-TC I4-T (2004–2013); 3.0 L 4JJ1-TCX I4-T (2006–2013)
- Transmission: 5-speed MUA-5H/MUX manual; 4-speed MaxMatic-II/III automatic

Dimensions
- Wheelbase: 3,050 mm (120.1 in)
- Length: 4,955 mm (195.1 in)
- Width: 1,800 mm (70.9 in)
- Height: 1,805 mm (71.1 in)

Chronology
- Predecessor: Isuzu Wizard
- Successor: Isuzu MU-X

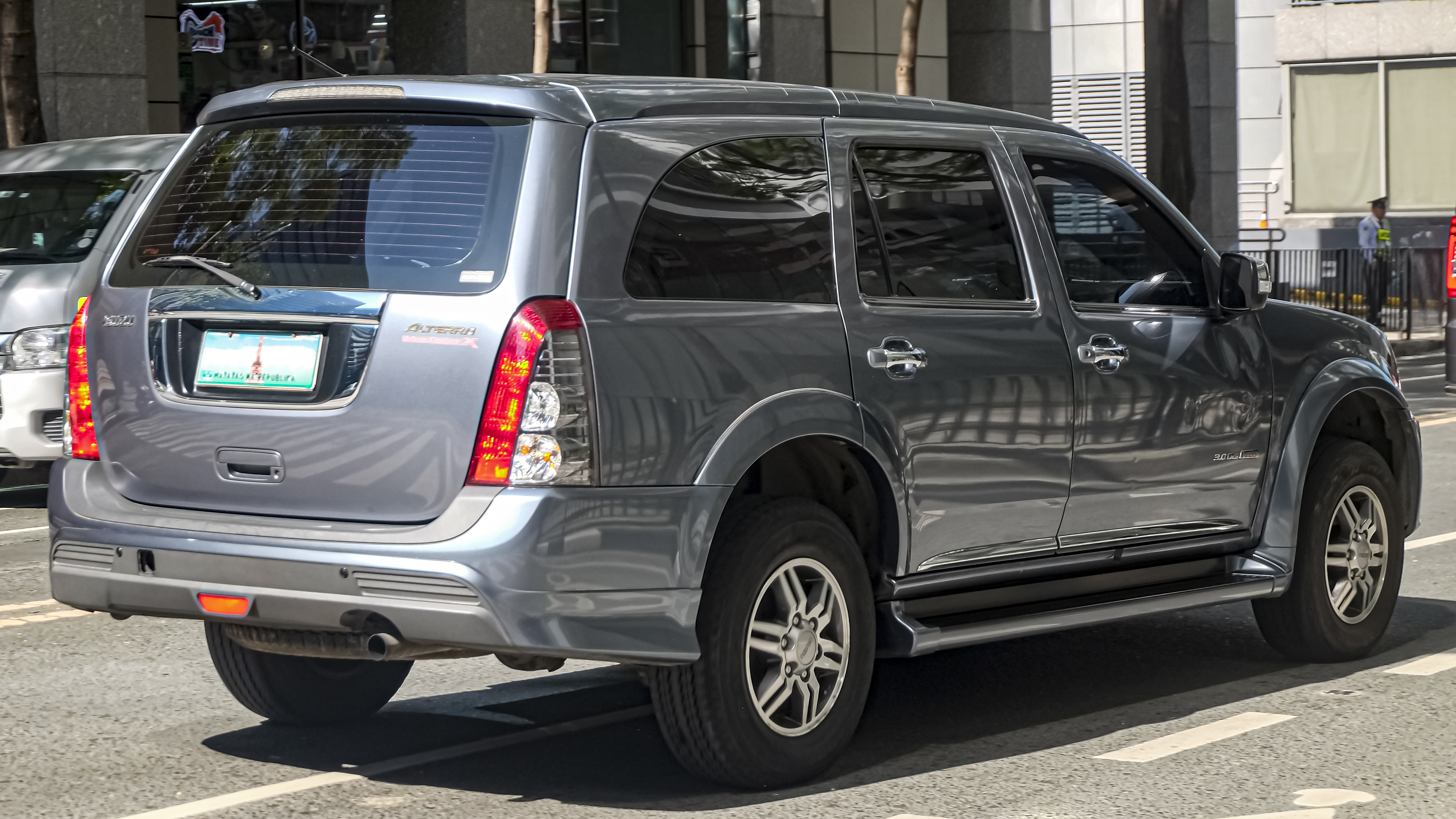
Rear

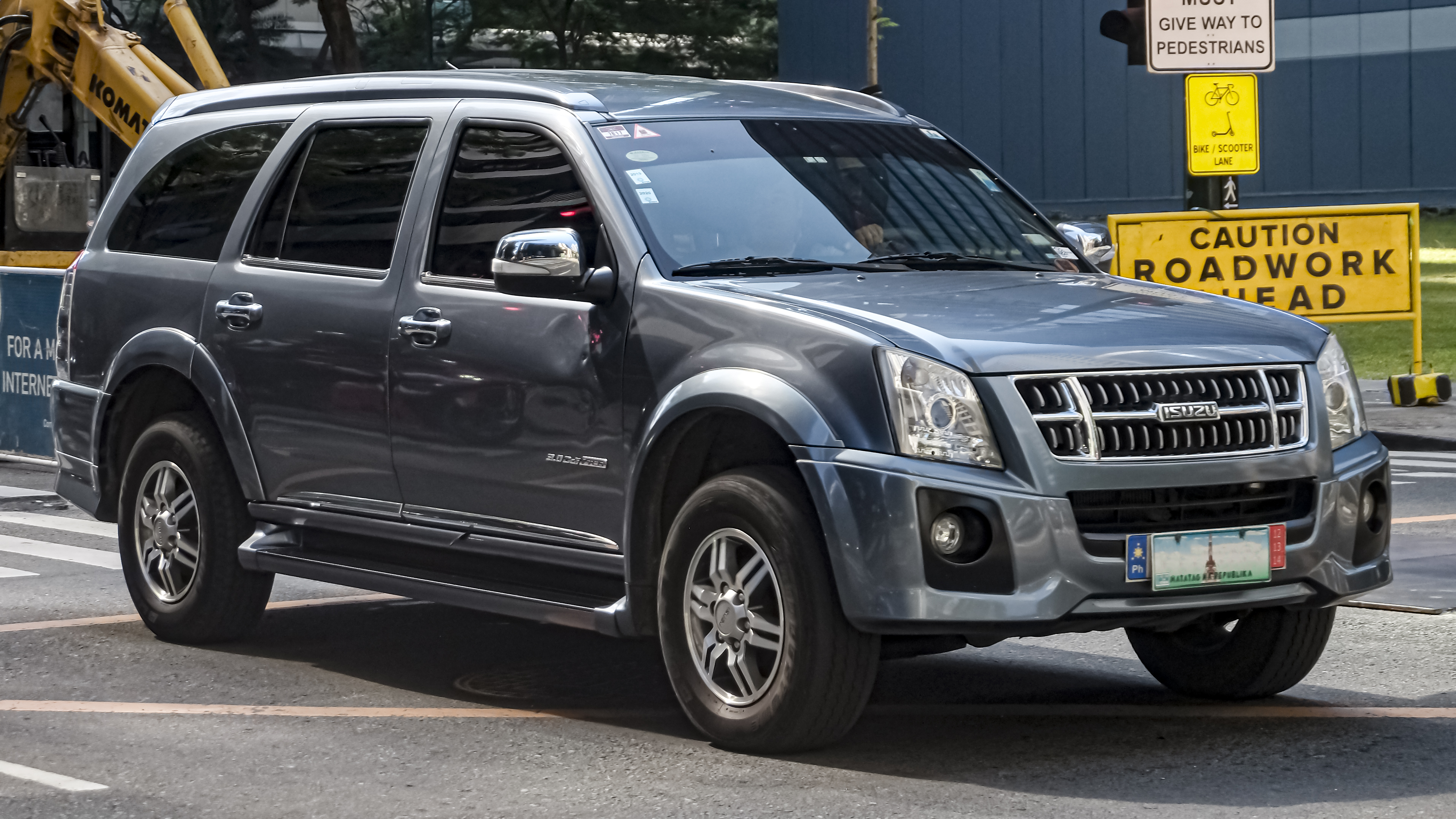
Facelift

The predecessor to the MU-X, the Isuzu MU-7 is a D-Max-based SUV with a three-row seating arrangement. The MU-7 was released in Thailand in November 2004, being advertised as a "Sport Utility Wagon". The MU-7 has the same front fascia and chassis as the D-Max but has a covered rear end instead of a truck bed. Unlike the MU-X, the MU-7 retains the same wheelbase as the D-Max. It was only available in some markets such as Thailand, the Philippines and India. In the Philippines, this model is called the Isuzu Alterra.

The MU-7 was sold with either rear-wheel drive or a 4x4 drivetrain. One engine, the 3.0 L 4JJ1-TC, was available. The car's "MOVE" suspension consists of torsion bar-sprung double wishbones on the front axle and leaf springs on the rear.

In the late third quarter of 2006, the MU-7 drivetrain options were named the Primo (4x2) and Activo (4x4). With a new 3.0 4JJ1-TCX engine option, new transmissions were implemented as well: a five-speed manual transmission and a MaxMatic-III automatic transmission. Also new was the interior, incorporating a console with wood trim and new seat upholstery.

As with the Gold Series trim of the D-Max, both the MU-7 Primo Gold Series and Activo Gold Series also received gold Isuzu badges in 3 locations. All Gold Series models also came equipped with a new navigation entertainment system incorporating a new reverse assist, all optional from early 2008. The Primo and Activo received a Wide Vision blind-spot rear view mirror. Also added was a lower-cost 4x2 model, the S with a 146 PS (107 kW) 3.0-litre engine, which was priced below the Primo.

MU-7 Platinum models were sold in Thailand from 1 November 2008, with tweaked front, fender, and side trim and platinum-painted engines. The MOVE suspension for Activo and Primo models was also retooled. The S model also received an automatic transmission as optional.

MU-7 Super Platinum models were introduced in the same month as the D-Max. Exterior changes include a new front bumper, new alloy wheels (except on the S), and newer blind spot rear view mirrors. Models with the 3.0 VGS Turbo engine also received light silver trim on the hood scoop.

In April 2011, the MU-7 Choiz was revealed at the Bangkok Motor Show, with new alloy wheels and small changes to the interior. In December 2011, the Choiz was facelifted with new alloy wheels. It was available in 4WD, 2WD 3000 VGS Turbo and 2WD 3000 DDi configurations.

== First generation (RF; 2013) ==
First generation
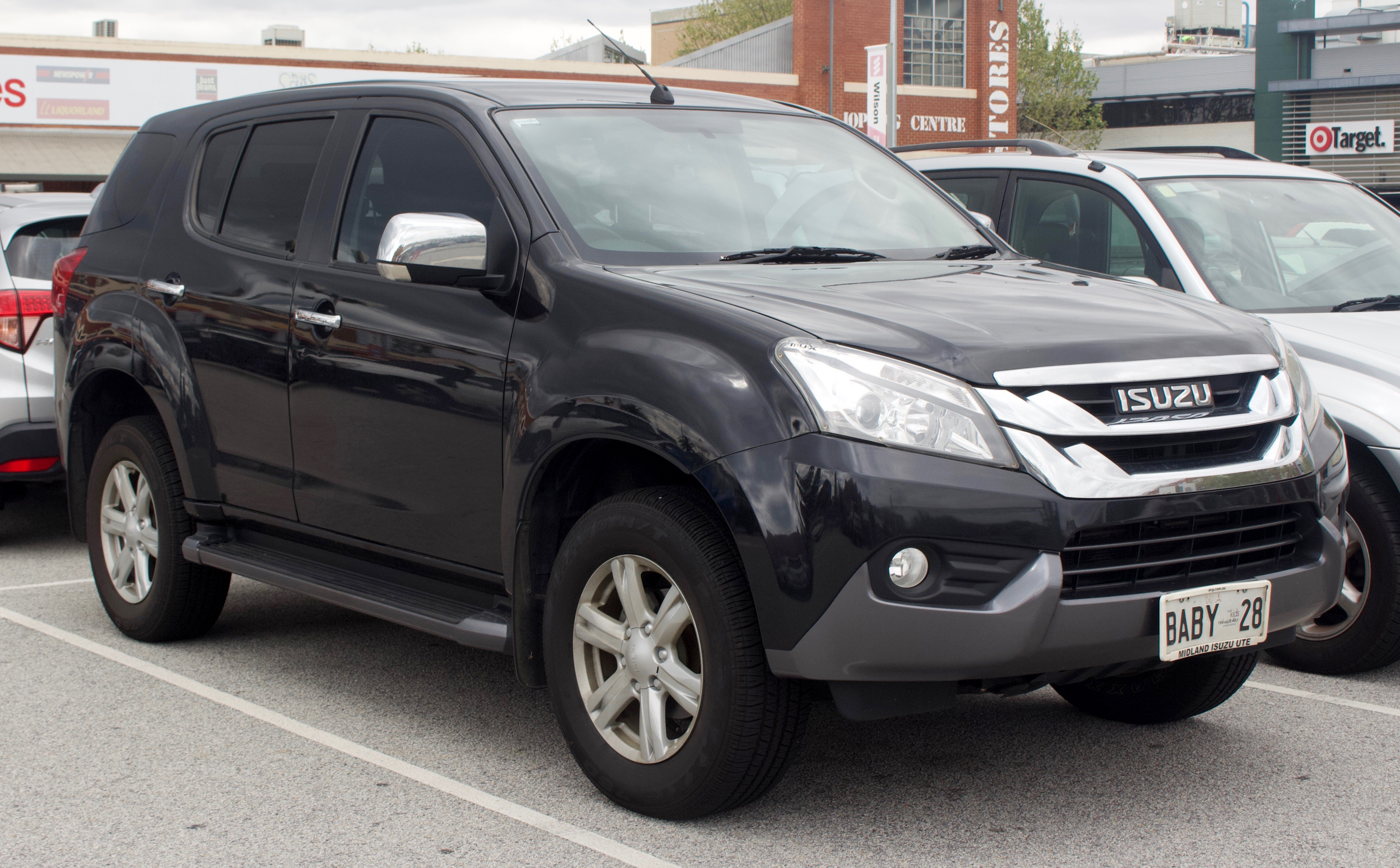

Overview
- Model code: RF
- Production: 2013–2021
- Assembly: Thailand: Samut Prakan (Isuzu Motors Thailand); India: Sri City (Isuzu Motors India); China: Jiangxi (Jiangxi Isuzu)

Body and chassis
- Related: Isuzu D-Max (RT); Chevrolet Colorado (RG); Chevrolet Trailblazer

Powertrain
- Engine: Diesel: 1.9 L RZ4E-TC I4; 2.5 L 4JK1-TCX I4; 3.0 L 4JJ1-TCX I4; Petrol: 2.0 L turbocharged Ford EcoBoost engine (China)
- Transmission: 5-speed manual; 5-speed Aisin TB-50LS automatic; 6-speed manual; 6-speed Aisin AWE6B45 II automatic

Dimensions
- Wheelbase: 2,845 mm (112.0 in)
- Length: 4,825 mm (190.0 in)
- Width: 1,860 mm (73.2 in)
- Height: 1,840 mm (72.4 in)

Chronology
- Predecessor: Isuzu MU-7

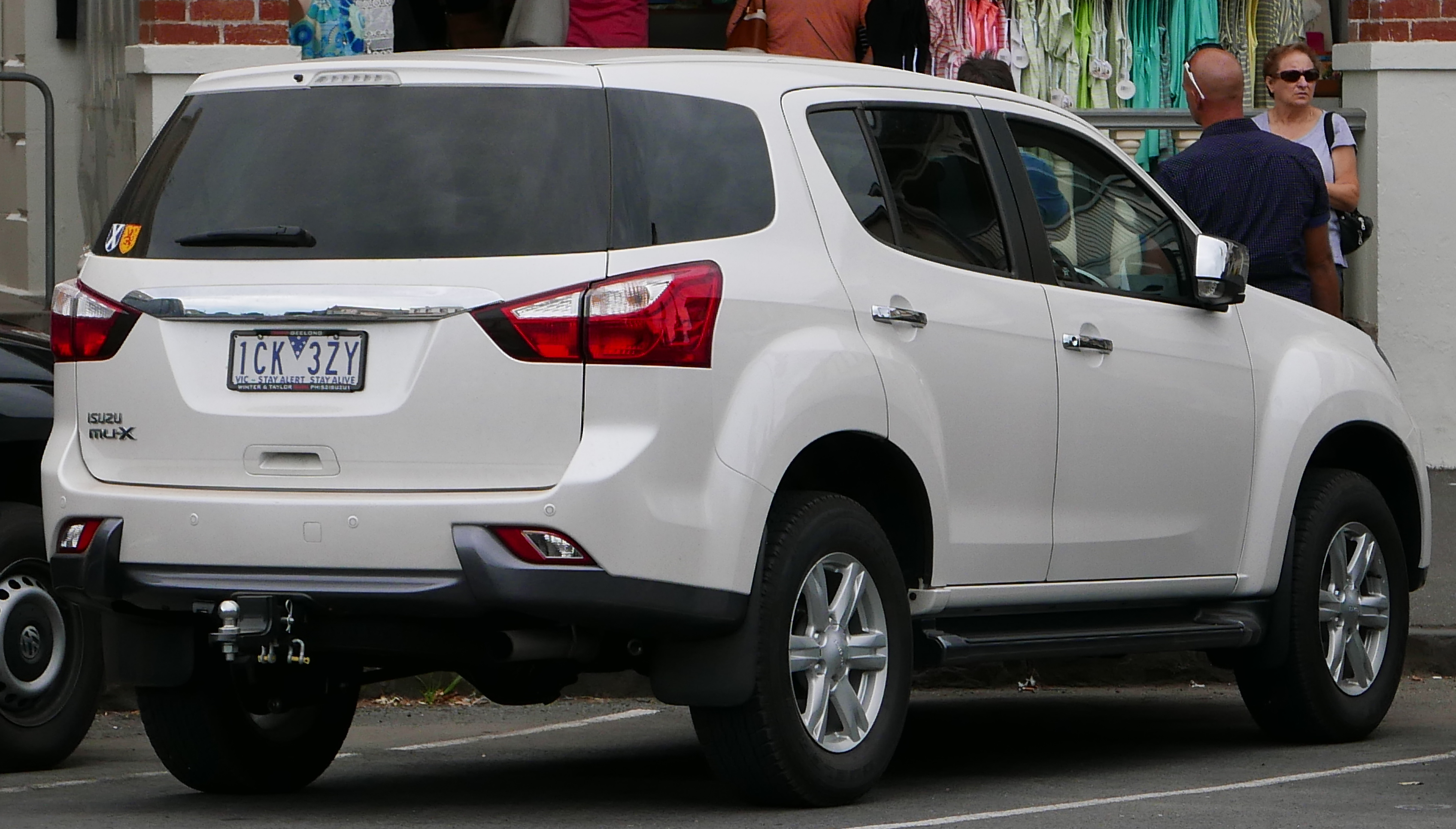
Rear view (pre-facelift)

The MU-X had its world premiere in Thailand on 31 October 2013 and was sold from 6 November 2013. The MU-X is a product from the collaboration between General Motors and Isuzu. As the result, it shared its platform with the Chevrolet Trailblazer and Holden Colorado. Due to an agreement with GM, the Trailblazer was released prior to the MU-X.

In Australia, it was launched in December 2013. To date, the MU-X has been sold only in Thailand, Australia, Paraguay, Indonesia, Philippines, Malaysia, Brunei (until 2016), Vietnam, China and India. Isuzu has plans to market it overseas in 50 countries. In December 2013, the MU-X was showcased at the 2013 Tokyo Motor Show, but is not sold in Japan.

=== Markets ===
==== China ====
In China, the MU-X was launched in May 2015 and was produced by Jiangxi Isuzu Motors.

==== Philippines ====
In the Philippines, the MU-X was launched on 9 September 2014 replacing the Alterra. It was available in three trim levels, LS, LS-M and LS-A. However, only the 2.5-litre engine has been made available due to fuel quality concerns. The two lower-end variants were only available in 2WD with a manual transmission, while the higher-end LS-A can be had in 2WD or 4WD with Terrain Command.

In October 2015, Isuzu Philippines Corporation introduced the 3.0-litre 4JJ1-TC engine with an output of 163 PS (120 kW; 161 hp) and 380 N⋅m (280 lbf⋅ft) of torque. This engine differs from the global 3.0-litre engine as it is still Euro II-compliant and produces less power than the 4JJ1-TCX. Apart from the new engine, a chrome exhaust tip, 3.0 TD chrome emblem, and daytime running lights are fitted as standard on the 3.0 models to differentiate them from the 2.5 models.

On 21 April 2016, the LS-A grade with manual transmission was added to the lineup while the LS-M grade was discontinued. It also received a feature list upgrade.

In September 2017, as part of the 20th anniversary of Isuzu Philippines, the facelifted MU-X debuted in the Philippines. It gets similar features as the Thai-spec model along with the newer Euro IV-compliant 3.0-litre 4JJ1-TCX with Blue Power.

In March 2020, the MU-X gained another feature list upgrade.

==== Thailand ====
In Thailand, the MU-X was available in three trim levels, being: Base (CD), Standard (DVD) and High (DVD Navi).

CD and DVD-trim levels are available with the 2.5-litre engine. These trims are called the 2.5 VGS CD and 2.5 VGS DVD respectively. when equipped with the 5-speed automatic (or 5-speed manual, which is 4x2 only). The DVD Navi trim level is available with both the 2.5- and 3.0-litre engines, with the 2.5-litre engine, it is called 2.5 VGS DVD Navi, In 3.0-litre engine with automatic transmission, it is badged as 3.0 VGS DVD Navi.

The 4x4 (which is 5-speed automatic only) is solely available in the 3.0 VGS DVD Navi trim level.

=== Facelift ===
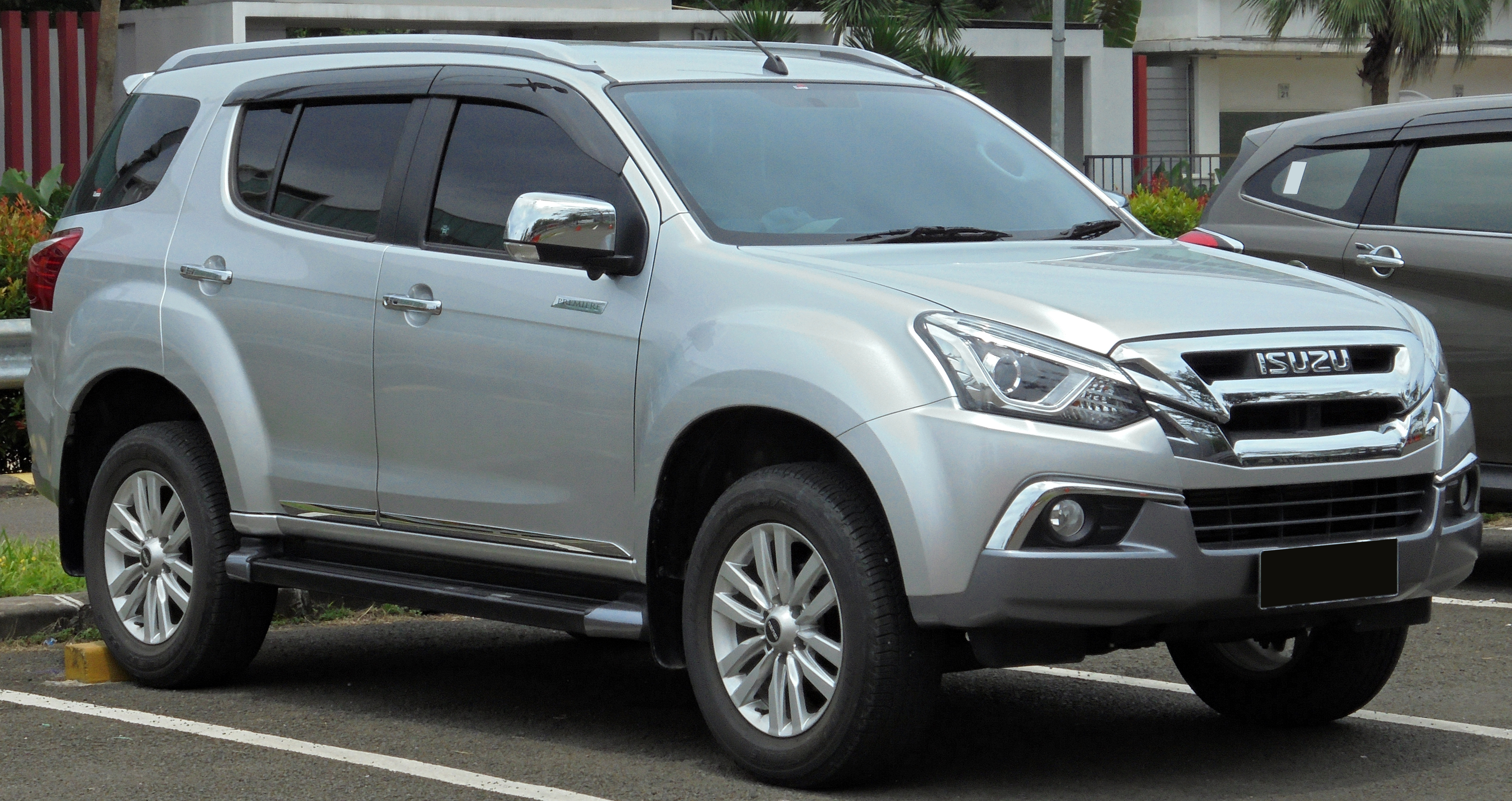
2017 facelift

On 14 February 2017, the facelifted MU-X was revealed in a teaser video and website. It debuted on 4 March 2017 prior to the Bangkok International Motor Show. This facelift including integrated LED front and tail lights, improved interior quality with the addition of soft material, a two-tone interior, and improved NVH. Engines remained the same as the outgoing model.

=== Engines ===
Diesel engines
Model	Code	Engine	Power	Torque	Transmissions	Year
1.9 DDi Blue Power	RZ4E-TC	1,898 cc common rail injection turbodiesel I4	150 PS (110 kW; 148 hp) @ 3,600 rpm	350 N⋅m (36 kg⋅m; 258 lb⋅ft) @ 1,800–2,600 rpm	6-speed manual 6-speed automatic	2016–present
2.5 DDi VGS	4JK1-TCX	2,499 cc common rail injection turbodiesel I4	136 PS (100 kW; 134 hp) @ 3,400 rpm	320 N⋅m (33 kg⋅m; 236 lb⋅ft) @ 1,800–2,800 rpm	5-speed manual 5-speed automatic 6-speed automatic	2013–present
3.0 DDi VGS	4JJ1-TCX	2,999 cc common rail injection turbodiesel I4	163 PS (120 kW; 161 hp) @ 3,550 rpm	380 N⋅m (39 kg⋅m; 280 lb⋅ft) @ 1,800–2,800 rpm	5-speed manual 5-speed automatic 6-speed automatic	2013–present
3.0 DDi VGS	4JJ1-TCX	2,999 cc common rail injection turbodiesel I4	177 PS (130 kW; 175 hp) @ 3,550 rpm	380 N⋅m (39 kg⋅m; 280 lb⋅ft) @ 1,800–2,800 rpm	5-speed manual 5-speed automatic 6-speed automatic	2013–present
3.0 DDi VGS	4JJ1-TCX	2,999 cc common rail injection turbodiesel I4	177 PS (130 kW; 175 hp) @ 3,550 rpm	430 N⋅m (44 kg⋅m; 317 lb⋅ft) @ 2,000 rpm	5-speed manual 5-speed automatic 6-speed automatic	2013–present

=== Safety ===
ANCAP test results* Isuzu MU-X (2013)
Test	Score
Overall	5 /5 stars
Frontal offset	13.58/16
Side impact	16/16
Pole	2/2
Seat belt reminders	2/3
Whiplash protection	Good
Pedestrian protection	Marginal
Electronic stability control	Standard

ANCAP test results* Isuzu MU-X (2013)
Test	Score
Overall	5 /5 stars
Frontal offset	13.58/16
Side impact	16/16
Pole	2/2
Seat belt reminders	0/3
Whiplash protection	Good
Pedestrian protection	Marginal
Electronic stability control	Standard

== Second generation (RJ; 2020) ==
Second generation
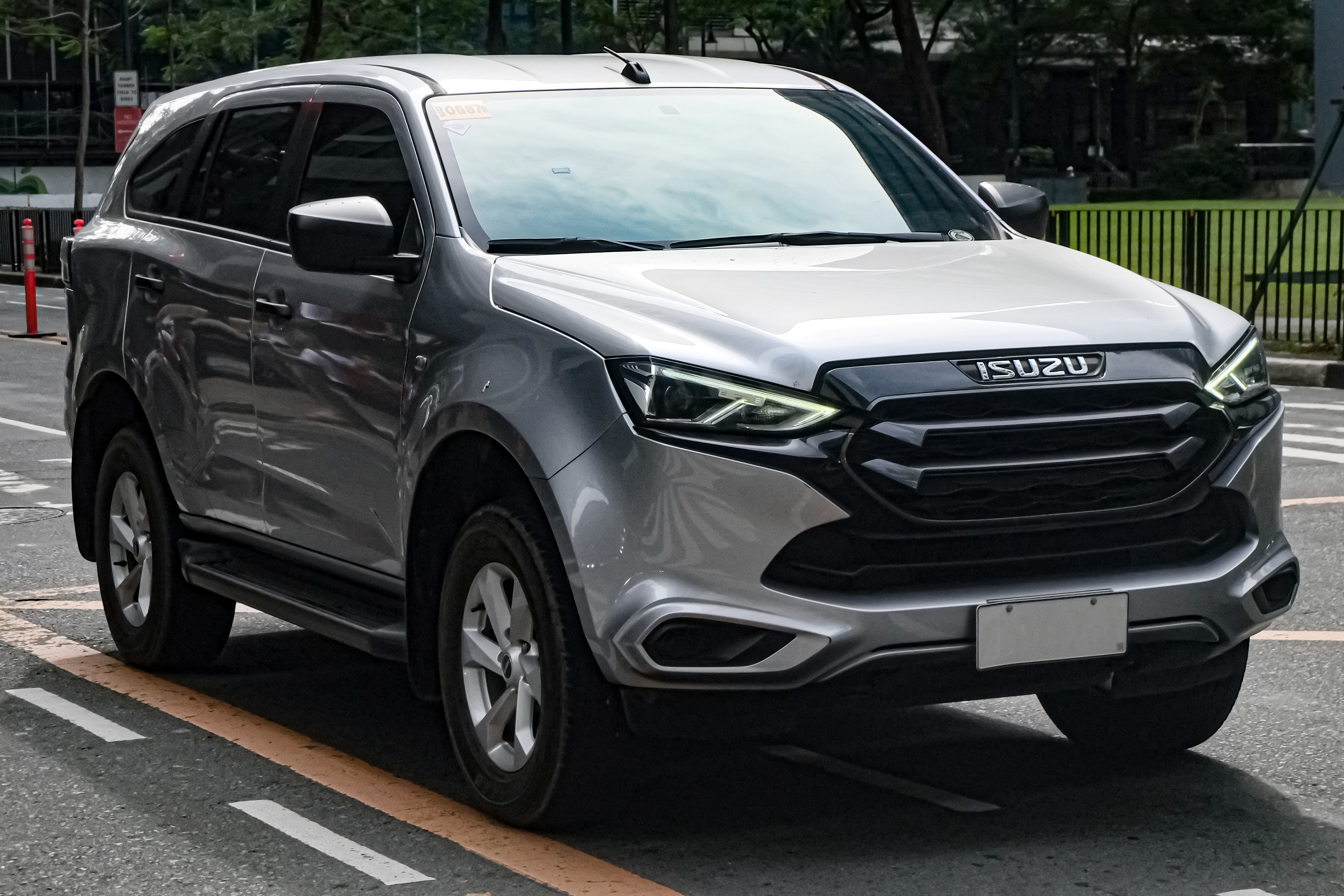

Overview
- Model code: RJ
- Production: 2020–present
- Assembly: Thailand: Samut Prakan (Isuzu Motors Thailand)
- Designer: Hiroshi Sasajima, Tomonobu Nishikawa, Yukinari Kato, Motoyoshi Tono, Shigeya Takahashi, Kunio Yoshida, and Atsushi Serizawa; Taku Sasajima (Facelift)

Body and chassis
- Platform: Isuzu Symmetric Mobility Platform
- Related: Isuzu D-Max (third generation); Mazda BT-50 (TF)

Powertrain
- Engine: Diesel: 1.9 L RZ4E-TC GEN2 I4-T; 2.2 L RZ4F-TCX I4-TT; 2.2 L RZ4F-TC I4-T; 3.0 L 4JJ3-TCX I4-T
- Transmission: 6-speed Aisin AE6 manual; 6-speed Aisin AWE6B45 II Rev-Tronic automatic

Dimensions
- Wheelbase: 2,855 mm (112.4 in)
- Length: 4,850 mm (190.9 in)
- Width: 1,870 mm (73.6 in)
- Height: 1,875 mm (73.8 in)
- Curb weight: 1,820–1,955 kg (4,012–4,310 lb)

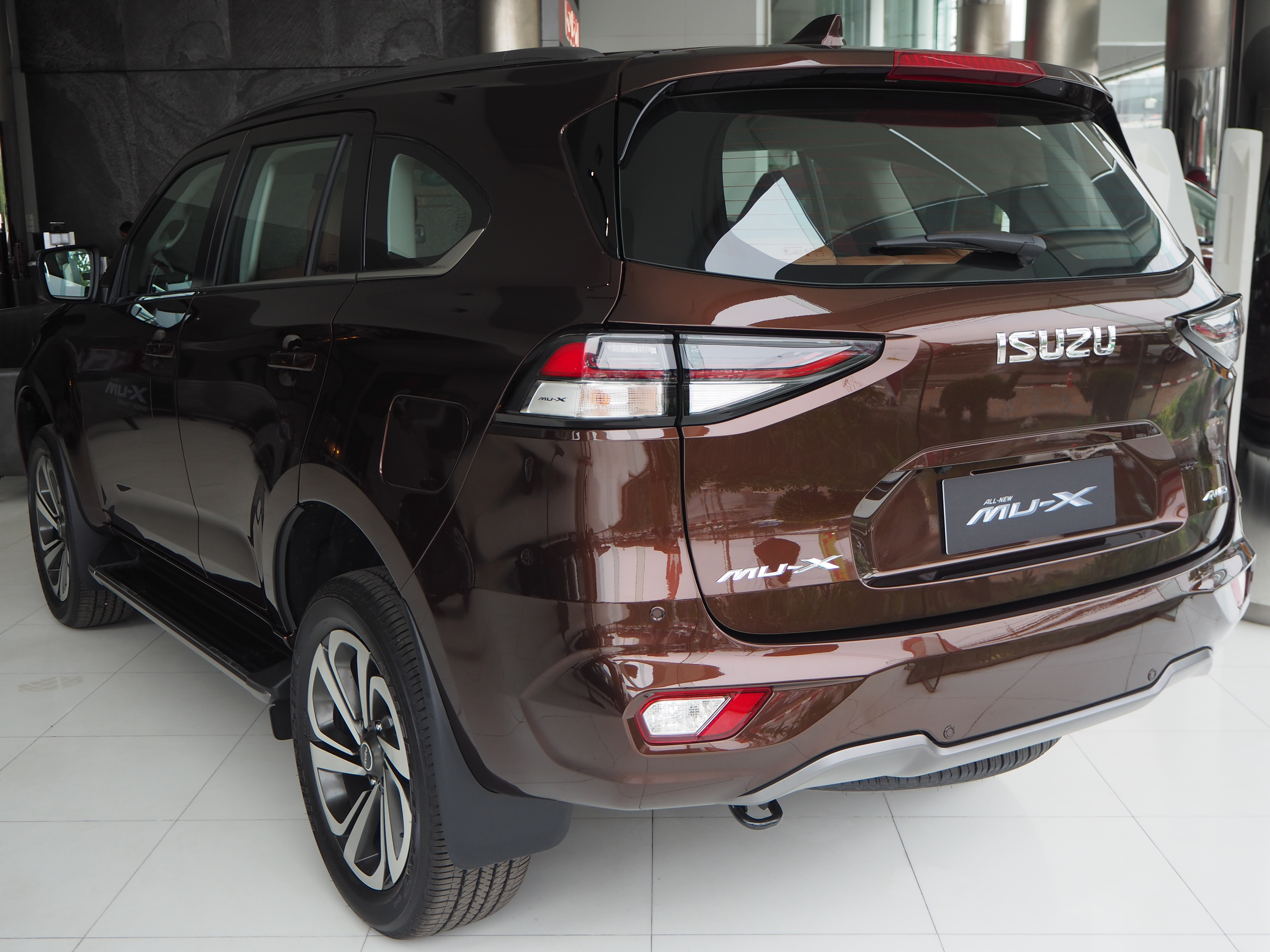
Rear

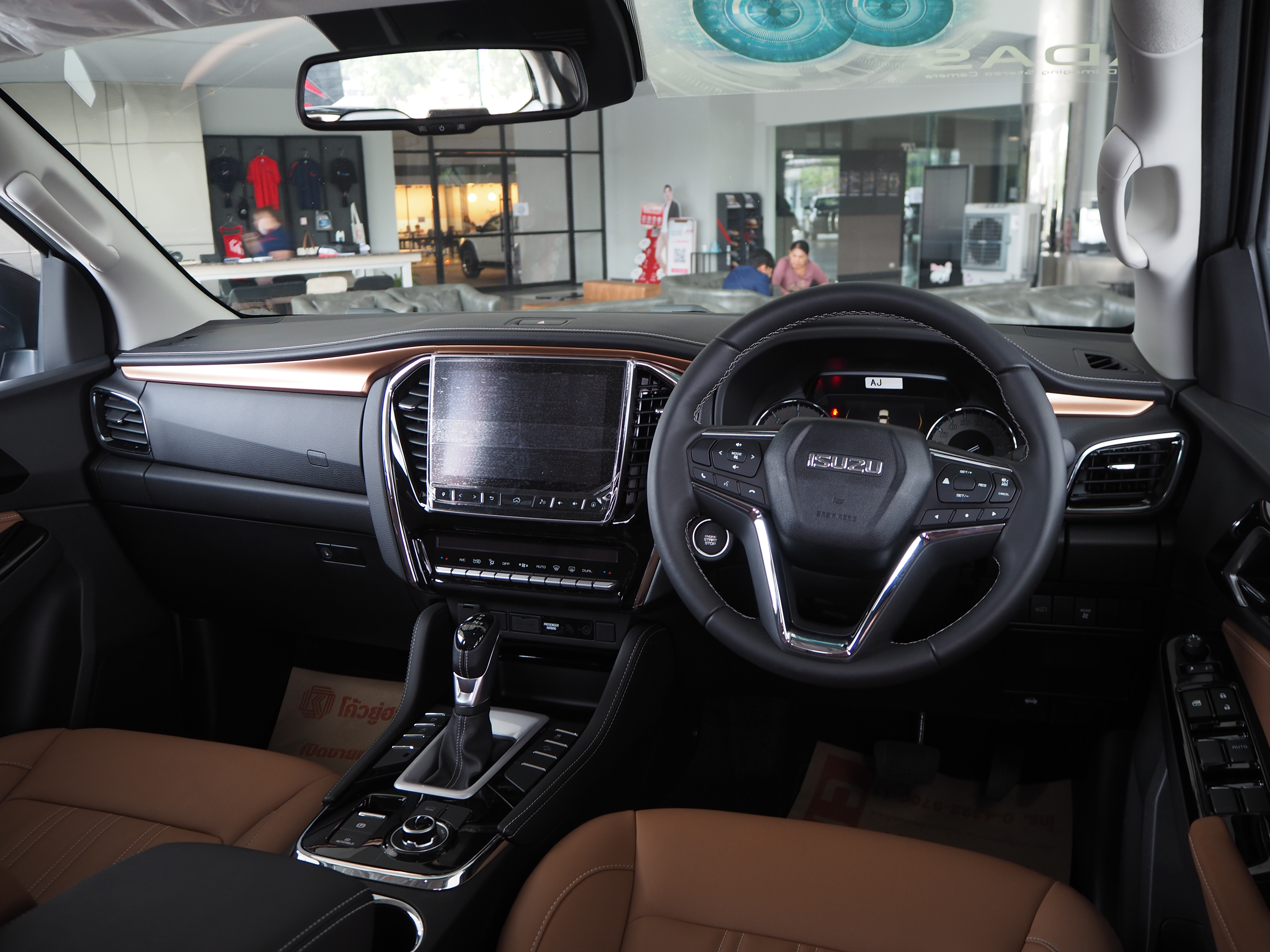
Interior

The second-generation MU-X was revealed on 28 October 2020 in Thailand. It shares the same platform with the third generation D-Max, which in turn is also closely related to the third-generation Mazda BT-50.

=== Markets ===
==== Australia ====
The MU-X was launched in Australia on 30 July 2021, it is offered in three grades: LS-M, LS-U, and LS-T. All variants are powered by a 3.0-litre turbocharged diesel engine paired to an automatic, with the option of 4x2 and 4x4 configurations. In March 2024, the 1.9-litre turbocharged diesel engine was made available for the LS-M and LS-U grades.

The facelifted MU-X debuted in Australia on 20 February 2025 with the addition of the new X-Terrain model. In September 2025, the 1.9-litre turbocharged diesel engine option was replaced with the 2.2-litre diesel turbocharged engine.

==== Indonesia ====
The second generation MU-X was launched in Indonesia on 10 November 2021 at the 28th Gaikindo Indonesia International Auto Show. It is only offered in one configuration, with a 1.9-litre turbocharged diesel engine, an automatic transmission, and 4x4.

In the Indonesian market, Isuzu has shifted its focus for the second generation MU-X for fleet sales, specifically targeting operational vehicles for businesses, especially in the mining industry. As a result, the second generation MU-X in Indonesia is offered only in one variant with fewer features compared to other markets. However, individuals could still purchase the MU-X in the country for personal use.

The facelifted MU-X debuted in Indonesia on 24 July 2025 at the 32nd Gaikindo Indonesia International Auto Show, with the same sole variant from the pre-facelift model.

==== New Zealand ====
The second generation MU-X was launched in New Zealand in October 2021. It is offered in a sole variant, powered by a 3.0-litre turbocharged diesel engine paired to an automatic, with 4x4 configuration.

==== Philippines ====
The second generation MU-X was launched in the Philippines on 22 September 2021. It was initially offered in six variants with five grades: LS 4x2 RZ4E A/T, LS-A 4x2 RZ4E M/T, LS-A 4x2 3.0 A/T, LS-E 4x2 3.0 A/T, and LS-E 4x4 3.0 A/T.

In February 2024, the MU-X received a 360-degree view camera, wireless charger and digital video recorder as standard for the LS-E and LS-A grades. The manual transmission option has been dropped.

The facelifted MU-X debuted in the Philippines on 4 April 2025, with grade and engine choices remain unchanged from the pre-facelift model.

==== South Africa ====
The second generation MU-X was launched in South Africa on 17 November 2021, it is offered with four grades at launch: LS (4x2), LS (4x4), LSE (4x2) and Onyx (4x4), all variants are powered by a 3.0-litre turbocharged diesel engine paired to a 6-speed automatic. In May 2023, the MU-X range was updated in South Africa with additional features for certain grades and the addition of a new grade, LSE (4x4). In August 2023, the MU-X was made available with a 1.9-litre turbocharged diesel engine only for the LS grade in 4x2 configuration.

The facelifted MU-X debuted in South Africa on 6 May 2025, with grade and engine choices remain unchanged from the pre-facelift model.

==== Thailand ====
The second generation MU-X in Thailand is offered with two engine options: a 1.9-litre and 3.0-litre turbocharged diesel engines. The 1.9-litre is used for four variants: 1.9 Active, 1.9 Luxury, 1.9 Elegance and 1.9 Ultimate; while the 4JJ3-TCX engine is exclusive to the 3.0 Elegance, 3.0 Ultimate and 3.0 Ultimate 4WD.

The facelifted MU-X is available in four trim levels: Active, Elegant, Ultimate and RS. The 3.0-litre turbocharged diesel engine is standard on the RS trim but optional on the Elegant and Ultimate trim levels, and a 4x4 option on the RS trim. In November 2024, the 1.9-litre turbocharged diesel engine option was replaced with the 2.2-litre turbocharged diesel engine. In October 2025, the MU-X received ADAS system in all grades, upgraded shock absorbers and the 3.0-litre turbocharged diesel engine was no longer available with the Elegant and Ultimate trims. In February 2026, the 4x4 option was made available for the Ultimate and RS trims equipped with the 2.2-litre turbocharged diesel engine. In October 2026, the 3.0-litre turbocharged diesel engine option was replaced with the 2.2-litre twin-turbocharged diesel engine.

==== Vietnam ====
The second generation MU-X was launched in Vietnam on 23 July 2022 and is offered in four grades: B7 M/T (4x2), B7 Plus A/T (4x2), Prestige A/T (4x2), and Premium A/T (4x4). All variants are powered by a 1.9-litre turbocharged diesel engine.

The facelifted MU-X debuted in Vietnam on 6 June 2025, with variants and engine option remain unchanged from the pre-facelift model. However, the facelift saw the introduction of the new Sport variant.

=== Facelift ===
The facelifted MU-X debuted on 12 June 2024 in Thailand with a new front end design, new taillights and a few interior changes.

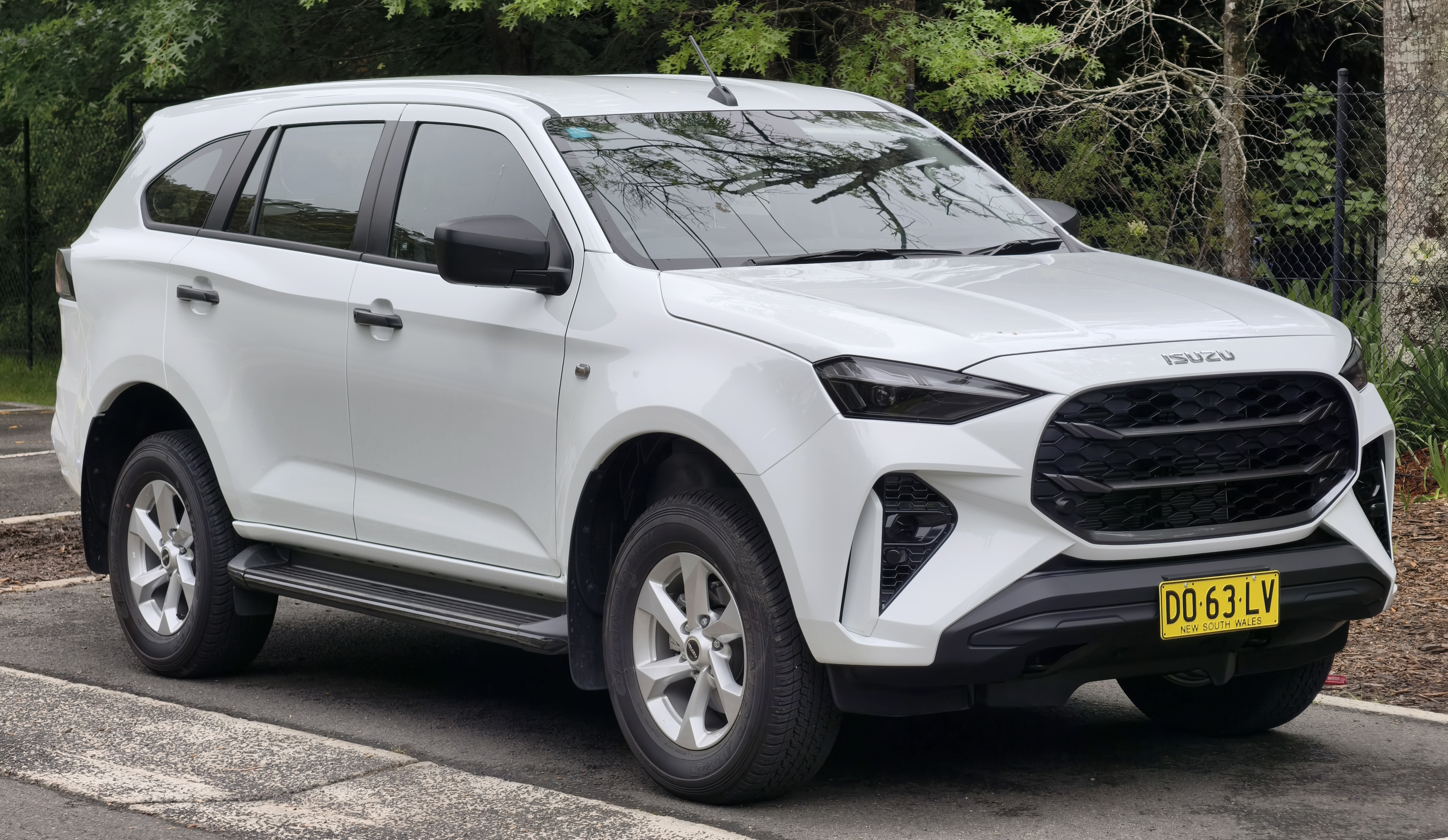
2024 facelift

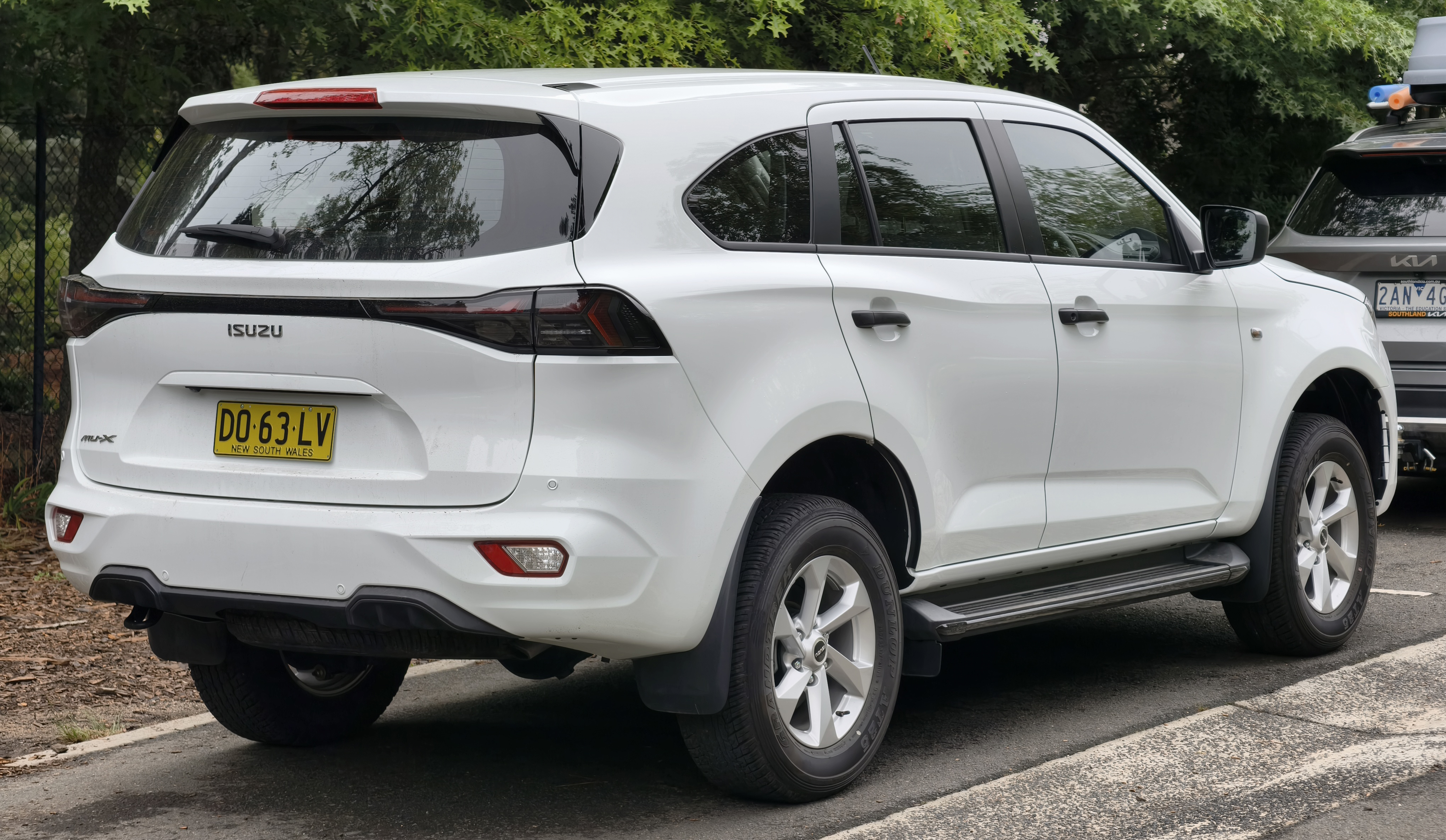
Rear view

=== Engines ===
Diesel engines
Model	Code	Engine	Power	Torque	Transmissions
1.9 Ddi Blue Power	RZ4E-TC GEN2	1,898 cc common rail injection turbo-diesel I4	150 PS (110 kW; 148 hp) @ 3,600 rpm	350 N⋅m (36 kg⋅m; 258 lb⋅ft) @ 1,800–2,600 rpm	6-speed manual (except Thailand); 6-speed automatic
2.2 Ddi MaxForce	RZ4F-TC	2,164 cc common rail injection turbo-diesel I4	163 PS (120 kW; 161 hp) @ 3,600 rpm	400 N⋅m (41 kg⋅m; 295 lb⋅ft) @ 1,600–2,600 rpm	8-speed automatic
2.2 Ddi MaxForce; Bi-Turbo	RZ4F-TCX	2,164 cc common rail injection twin-turbo-diesel I4	204 PS (150 kW; 201 hp) @ 3,600 rpm	500 N⋅m (51 kg⋅m; 369 lb⋅ft) @ 1,600–2,600 rpm	8-speed automatic
3.0 Ddi VGS	4JJ3-TCX	2,999 cc common rail injection turbodiesel I4	190 PS (140 kW; 187 hp) @ 3,600 rpm	450 N⋅m (46 kg⋅m; 332 lb⋅ft) @ 1,600–2,600 rpm	6-speed automatic

=== Safety ===
ANCAP test results Isuzu MU-X (2020, aligned with Euro NCAP)
Test	Points	%
Overall:	5 /5 stars	
Adult occupant:	33.25	87%
Child occupant:	41.99	85%
Pedestrian:	37.63	69%
Safety assist:	13.49	84%

ASEAN NCAP test results Isuzu MU-X (2020)
Test	Points
Overall:	5 /5 stars
Adult occupant:	42.17
Child occupant:	22.64
Safety assist:	22.01

ANCAP test results Isuzu MU-X (2022, aligned with Euro NCAP)
Test	Points	%
Overall:	5 /5 stars	
Adult occupant:	33	86%
Child occupant:	41.99	85%
Pedestrian:	37.63	69%
Safety assist:	13.49	84%

== Sales ==
Year	Thailand	Australia	Philippines	Malaysia (Note: Figures based on registration, may include grey imports and used car imports (Malaysia))	Indonesia
2014	19,040	4,625			464
2015	12,524	6,344		435	1,076
2016	8,855	7,018		301	0
2017	12,371	8,087	13,157	142	750
2018	12,554	9,090		74	544
2019	9,477	8,419		10	527
2020	8,139	7,049		12	108
2021	15,434	10,618	1,083	0	61
2022	20,520	10,987			275
2023	20,851	14,139			355
2024	13,014	17,978			87
