= Flitch beam =

Type of structural member

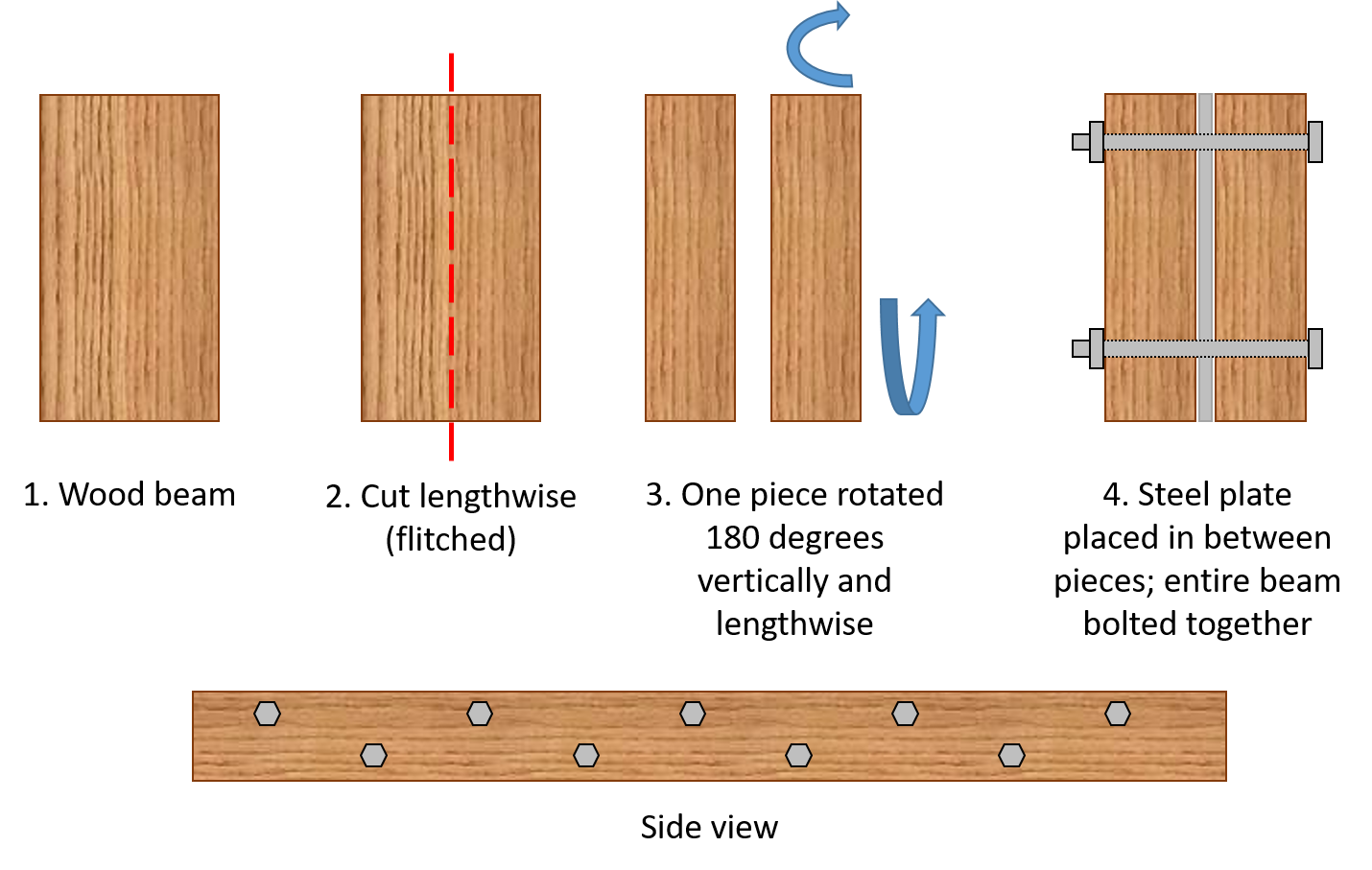
Visual description of how a flitch beam is constructed

A flitch beam (or flitched beam) is a compound beam used in the construction of houses, decks, and other primarily wood-frame structures. Typically, the flitch beam is made up of a vertical steel plate sandwiched between two wood beams, the three layers being held together with bolts. In that common form it is sometimes referenced as a steel flitch beam. Further alternating layers of wood and steel can be used to produce an even stronger beam. The metal plates within the beam are known as flitch plates.^{[1]} Flitch beams were used as a cost-effective way to strengthen long-span wooden beams, and have been largely supplanted by more recent technology.

== History ==
"Flitch" originally referred to a slab of bacon, which was cut into strips lengthwise. Similarly, a wooden beam was flitched by cutting it lengthwise; one half was then rotated 180 degrees both longitudinally and laterally to ensure that any defects were separated. In the 18th century, before the availability of steel beams, pine beams were flitched with hardwood such as oak.

With the availability of affordable steel, flitch beams became a way to strengthen long-span wooden beams cost-effectively while taking up less space than solid wood. An 1883 article from The American Architect and Building News compares three alternatives in a hypothetical railway station "in which the second story is devoted to offices, and where we must use girders to support the second floor of 25-foot span, and not less than 12 feet on centres if we can avoid it. This would give us, to be supported by the girder, a floor area of 12' x 25' = 300 square feet" and 31,500 pounds of load. After performing calculations the beams compare as follows:

Beam Material	Size	Cost
Pine	14" x 17"	$25.75
Iron	Two 12" girders	$83.32
Flitch-plate	12" x 14"	$70.70

The article also cites the fire-retardant character of the flitch beam, "in case of a fire would not probably affect the iron until the wooden beams were badly burned."

With the advent of high-strength engineered lumber, the advantages of flitch-beams disappeared. For example, comparing the capacity of 2 beams spanning 18 feet:

Beam Composition	Allowable Applied Load In Pounds Per Linear Foot
3½ʺ × 11¼ʺ laminated veneer lumber (LVL) member	398
2 × 12 flitch beam constructed of ½ʺ steel plate with two laminations of #2 SPF	386

Additionally, use of this type of beam has greatly declined due to the high cost of labor. Engineered lumber can be cut to length and installed much like sawn lumber; the flitch requires shop fabrication and/or field bolting. This, coupled with a much increased self-weight of the beam (11.4 pounds (5.2 kg) for engineered wood vs. 25.2 pounds (11.4 kg) for a flitch beam), decreases the viability of the system.

== Modern uses ==
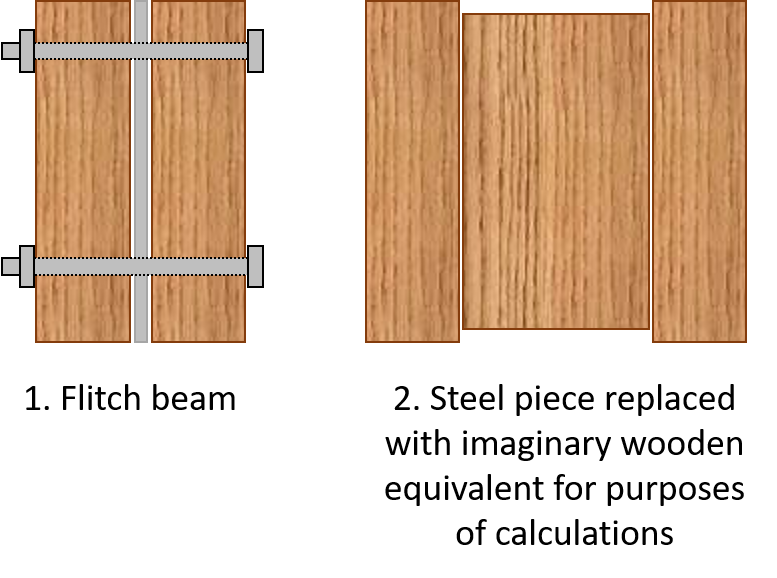
Visual description of how the strength of a flitch beam is measured

Flitch beams are currently mainly used in historic renovations, where they can be used to reinforce aged lumber supports, or for aesthetic purposes, where exposed beams with the appearance of wood and the strength of steel are required. An adaptive use project in the UK, changing stables into offices, required cutting the beam supporting a floor down its entire length, and then inserting a similarly sized steel plate. The resulting flitched beam was then secured with resin and bolts, preserving appearance while providing strength. Flitch beams were used as columns in a two-story new construction. Glulam beams were used to support the second floor and the roof. This allowed the appearance of wooden columns, while providing the necessary strength.

The method for calculating the size of a flitch beam to be used in construction is straightforward, using the transformed-section method. The steel plate is treated as an equally stiff piece of wood, with its width modified by the ratio of their moduli of elasticity. This allows the deflection of the entire beam to be calculated as if it were entirely made up of wood.

There is modest business activity involving flitch beams with The Timber Research and Development Association (TRADA) developing a new flitch beam, a construction software program offering calculation for flitch beam designs, and at least one firm offering pre-fabricated flitch beams in various configurations.
