= Duramax I4 engine =

Duramax I4 LWN
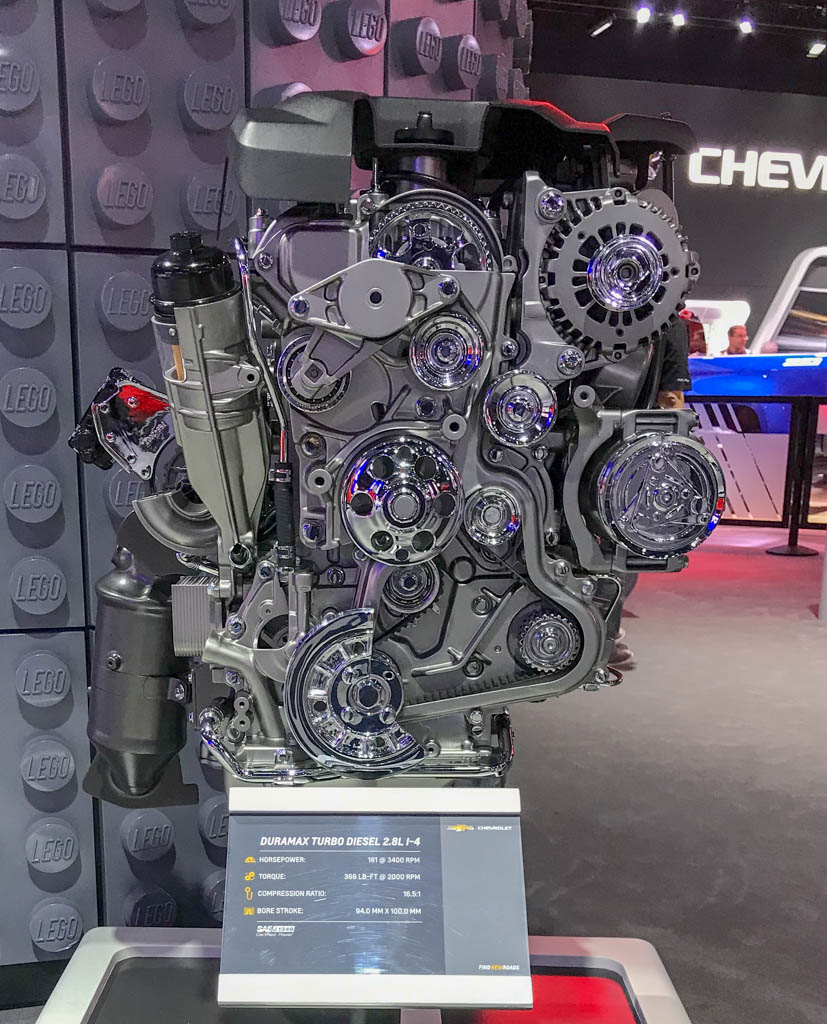
- Duramax LWN

Overview
- Manufacturer: General Motors Thailand; GM Brazil
- Production: 2015 – Present

Layout
- Configuration: I4
- Displacement: 2.8 L; 169.4 cu in (2,776 cc)
- Cylinder bore: 3.70 in (94 mm)
- Piston stroke: 3.94 in (100 mm)
- Cylinder block material: Cast gray iron
- Cylinder head material: Aluminum
- Valvetrain: DOHC 4 valves x cyl.
- Valvetrain drive system: Belt
- Compression ratio: 16.5:1; 15:5:1 (New generation)

Combustion
- Turbocharger: Honeywell/Garrett variable-geometry vane with intercooler
- Fuel system: High-pressure common-rail direct injection
- Management: Denso
- Fuel type: Diesel
- Cooling system: Water-cooled

Output
- Power output: 181 hp (135 kW); 204 hp (152 kW) (New generation)
- Torque output: 369 lb⋅ft (500 N⋅m); 376 lb⋅ft (510 N⋅m) (New generation)

Emissions
- Emissions target standard: EPA Tier 3 Euro 5 / PROCONVE L7; Euro 6c / PROCONVE L8
- Emissions control systems: DOC, SCR, DPF, EGR

The Duramax I4 engine is a family of turbocharged diesel I4 engines sold by General Motors in 2.5 and 2.8 liter sizes as an option for the Chevrolet Colorado, GMC Canyon, Chevrolet Express, and GMC Savana in southeast Asia and Oceania (Australia / New Zealand) from 2012, and in North America from 2016 through 2022. They are closely related to the VM Motori R 425 and A 428, and were produced at the General Motors Thailand plant in Rayong and currently by GM Brazil in São José.

== History ==
GM purchased a 50% stake in VM Motori from Penske Automotive in 2007. In 2010, VM released the A 428 (four-cylinder, 2.8 L displacement), developed from the earlier R 428, which was sold in North America briefly as an optional engine for the Jeep Liberty for the 2005 and 2006 model years. Fiat acquired the other half of VM from Penske in 2011 and purchased GM's share in 2013; as part of the sale, GM retained the rights to build engines that had been developed during its ownership, including the A 428.

In 2011, GM completed a new engine plant in Rayong, Thailand, commencing production in September of the R 425 and A 428 as Duramax XLD25 and XLD28, respectively, for the Chevrolet Colorado and Trailblazer sold in southeast Asia and, under the Holden marque, in Oceania. In 2013, these engines were updated as the Duramax LKH (2.5L) and LWH (2.8L), improving output and fuel consumption.

The Rayong plant began producing the 2.8L Duramax I4 LWN starting in 2015, modified to meet emissions regulations in the United States, until its closure in 2020.

In 2021, GM announced additional investment in the São José dos Campos plant in Brazil, where efforts began to begin production on a new-generation LWN.

By 2025, the upgraded LWN began shipping with the newly-facelifted Chevrolet S10 and Trailblazer in South America, superseding the XLD28 as the standard diesel engine option.

== Engine RPO codes ==
=== XLD25 ===
As originally released, the Duramax XLD25 had an output of 110 kW (150 hp) at 3,800 RPM and 350 N⋅m (260 lbf⋅ft) at 2,000 RPM.

- 2012–2013 Chevrolet Colorado

=== XLD25 LP2 ===
RPO XLD25 (LP2) was sold in Thailand, meeting Euro 4 emissions standards. It is a turbocharged 16V DOHC 2.5 L; 152.5 cu in (2,499 cc) engine with common-rail direct injection. The bore and stroke are 92 and 94 mm (3.62 and 3.70 in), respectively, with a rated output of 132 kW (177 hp; 179 PS) at 3,600 rpm and 440 N⋅m (320 lbf⋅ft) at 2,000 rpm.

- 2014–? Chevrolet Colorado
- 2017–2020 Chevrolet Trailblazer

=== XLD28 ===
As originally released, the Duramax XLD28 had an output of 132, 147 kW (177, 197 hp) at 3,800 RPM and 440, 470, 500 N⋅m (320, 350, 370 lbf⋅ft) at 2,000 RPM, depending on the transmission.

- 2012–2020 Chevrolet Trailblazer
- 2012–2022 Chevrolet Colorado

=== LWN ===
RPO LWN was first introduced in 2016 and continued until 2022, after GM Thailand was dissolved in 2020. It is a 16-valve design with high-pressure common-rail direct injection. The diesel engine was discontinued in North America after the 2022 model year following the closure of GM's Rayong plant.

The following trucks use the LWN:

- 2016–2022 Chevrolet Colorado / GMC Canyon (North America)
- 2017–2022 Chevrolet Express / GMC Savana (North America)
- 2021–Present M1301 Infantry Squad Vehicle (US Army)

=== LWN (New generation) ===
The new generation LWN has an output of 204 hp (152 kW) at 3200 rpm and 376 lb.-ft (510 Nm) at 1600-2400rpm. It features a redesigned turbo, a revised piston bowl design for heat resistance, and redesigned fuel injector nozzles with a 200 bar increase in fuel pressure.

- 2025–Present Chevrolet S10 (South America)
- 2025–Present Chevrolet Trailblazer (South America)
