= Chevrolet TrailBlazer (SUV) =

American mid-size sport utility vehicle

Chevrolet Trailblazer/TrailBlazer
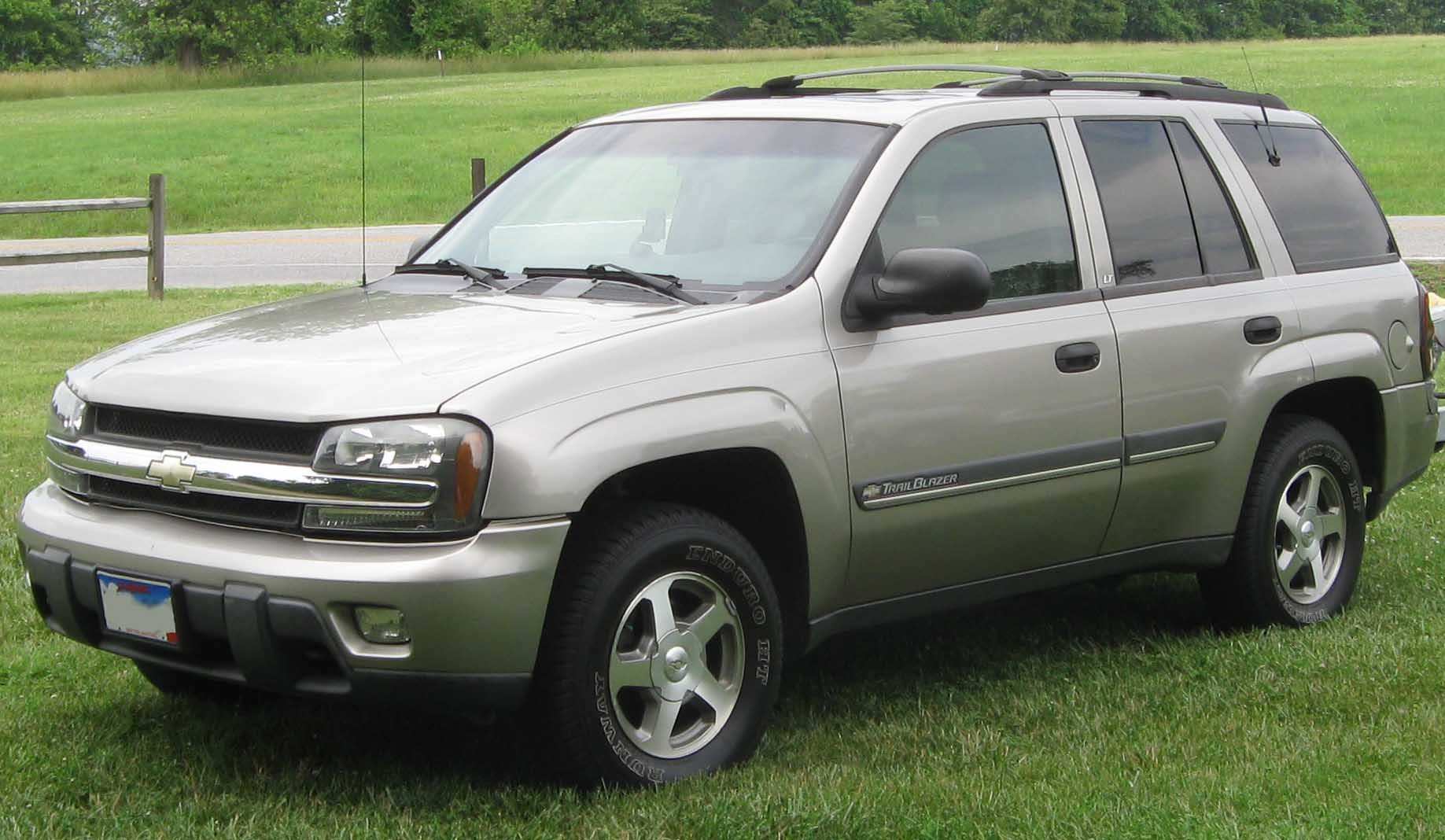

Overview
- Manufacturer: Chevrolet
- Production: 1998–2001 (as Blazer trim line); 2001–2008 (separate model, North America); 2011–2020 (Asia); 2011–present (South America)

Body and chassis
- Class: Mid-size SUV
- Body style: 5-door SUV
- Layout: Front-engine, rear-wheel-drive; Front-engine, four-wheel-drive
- Chassis: Body-on-frame

Chronology
- Predecessor: Chevrolet S-10 Blazer

The Chevrolet TrailBlazer (also known as Trailblazer) is a mid-size SUV produced by Chevrolet, a division of General Motors. The nameplate was first used in North America from 2001 to 2008; in 2009, it was replaced by the Traverse, as a crossover SUV. In 2011, production of a newly redesigned version of the Trailblazer for the Asian and Brazilian markets began.

== Blazer trim line (1998) ==
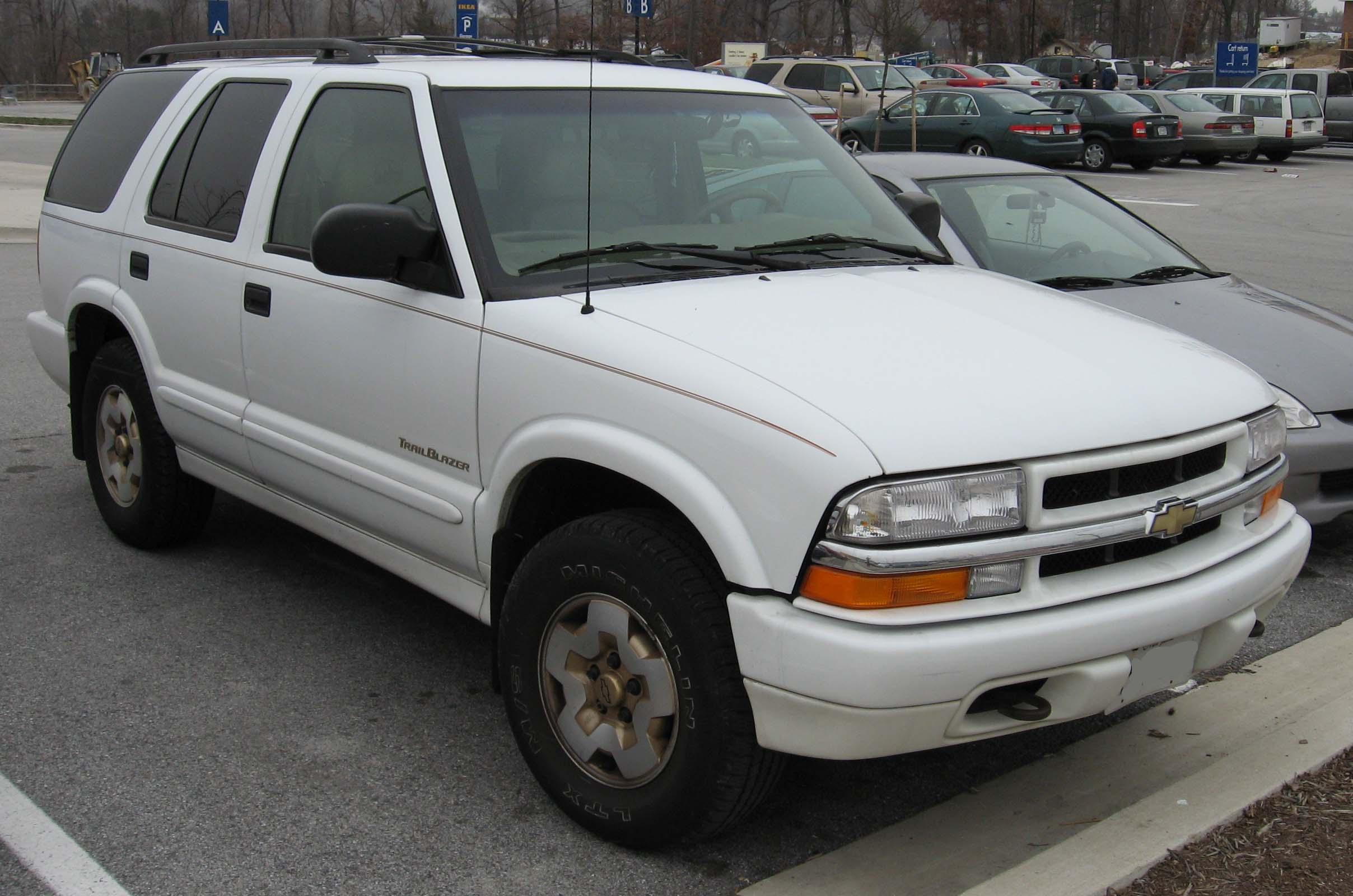
1999–2001 Chevrolet Blazer TrailBlazer

The TrailBlazer name was first introduced for the 1999 model year as an upscale trim level of the compact 4-door Chevrolet S-10 Blazer. It offered additional features on top of the previously top-of-the-line Chevrolet S-10 Blazer LT trim level, including an AM/FM stereo with single-disc CD player and optional remote cassette player, OnStar, color-keyed front and rear bumpers, side cladding, a leather-wrapped steering wheel, upgraded alloy wheels, a full-size spare tire and wheel, and upgraded cloth seating surfaces with power front bucket seats. Options such as a Bose premium sound system, leather-trimmed seating surfaces with heated front seats, power sunroof, and gold accents for the exterior emblems were all available for the original TrailBlazer trim package. The TrailBlazer trim was discontinued after 2001, when an all-new TrailBlazer model was introduced as a mid-size SUV. Production of the S-10 Blazer overlapped until the 2005 model year.

== First generation (KC; 2001) ==
First generation (KC)
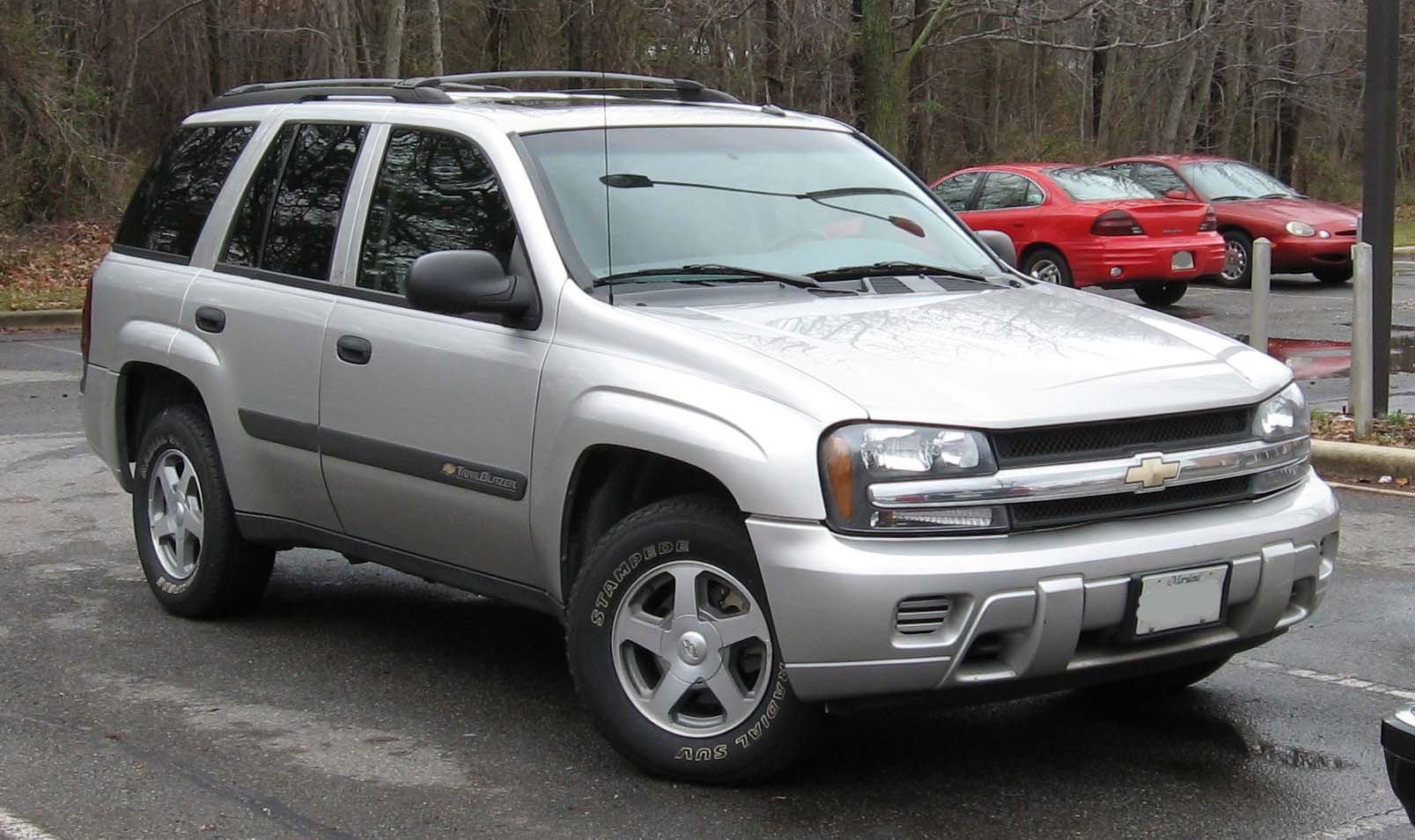

Overview
- Production: 2001–2008
- Model years: 2002–2009 (U.S. and Canada)
- Assembly: United States: Moraine, Ohio (Moraine Assembly); Oklahoma City, Oklahoma (Oklahoma City Assembly); Russia: Kaliningrad, Kaliningrad Oblast; Venezuela: Valencia
- Designer: Bill Davis (1997, 1998)

Body and chassis
- Platform: GMT360/GMT370 (EXT)
- Related: Buick Rainier; GMC Envoy; Isuzu Ascender; Oldsmobile Bravada; Saab 9-7X

Powertrain
- Engine: Gasoline: 4.2 L LL8 I6; 5.3 L LM4 V8; 5.3 L LH6 V8; 6.0 L LS2 V8
- Power output: 203.5 kW (273 hp; 277 PS) (4.2 L); 225 kW (302 hp; 306 PS) (5.3 L); 294 kW (394 hp; 400 PS) (6.0 L)
- Transmission: 4-speed 4L60E automatic; 4-speed 4L70E automatic (6.0 L)

Dimensions
- Wheelbase: Standard: 2,870 mm (113 in); EXT: 3,277 mm (129 in)
- Length: Standard: 4,872 mm (191.8 in); EXT: 5,278 mm (207.8 in)
- Width: 1,897 mm (74.7 in)
- Height: Standard: 1,892 mm (74.5 in) (2002–2003); 1,842 mm (72.5 in) (2004–2009); EXT: 1,958 mm (77.1 in) (2002–2003); 1,918 mm (75.5 in) (2004–2009)

Chronology
- Successor: Chevrolet Equinox (North America); Chevrolet Traverse (TrailBlazer EXT) (North America)

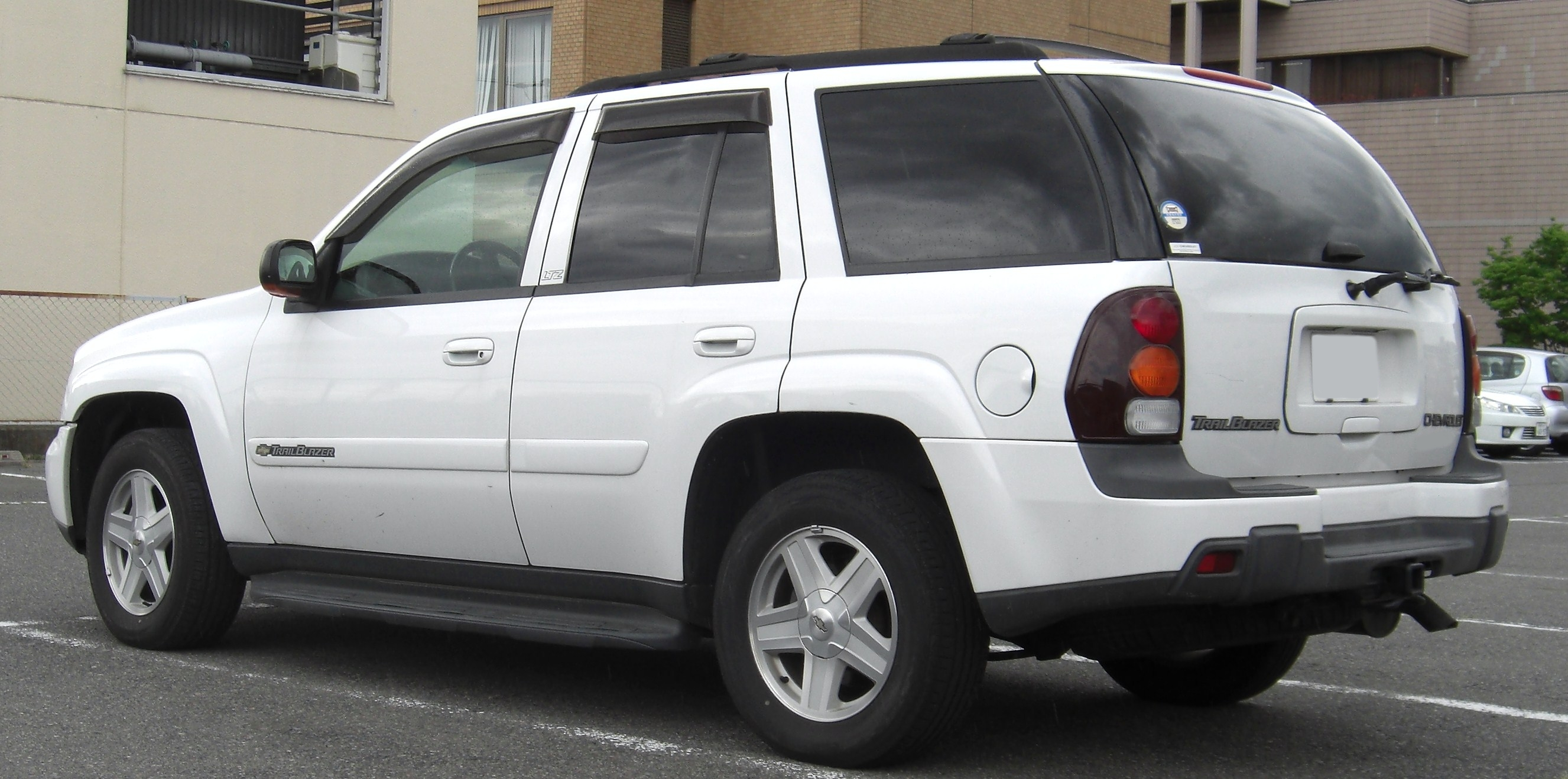
2002–2005 Chevrolet TrailBlazer, with modification to meet Japanese standards.

The first-generation TrailBlazer is based on a truck platform officially known as GMT360, with all models having four-wheel-drive layout as an option with both automatic engagement and the more traditional "Auto," "2-High," "4-High," and "4-Low" gearings, except the SS model which features an all-wheel-drive system. The TrailBlazer features an independent front suspension, and a five-link rear suspension. A G80 locking rear differential is available as an option on all models except for the SS, which has a G86 LSD as standard. An LTZ trim level had upgraded interior features (leather), upgraded sound system (Bose), and alloy wheels. All TrailBlazers came factory-equipped with a detachable towing hitch.

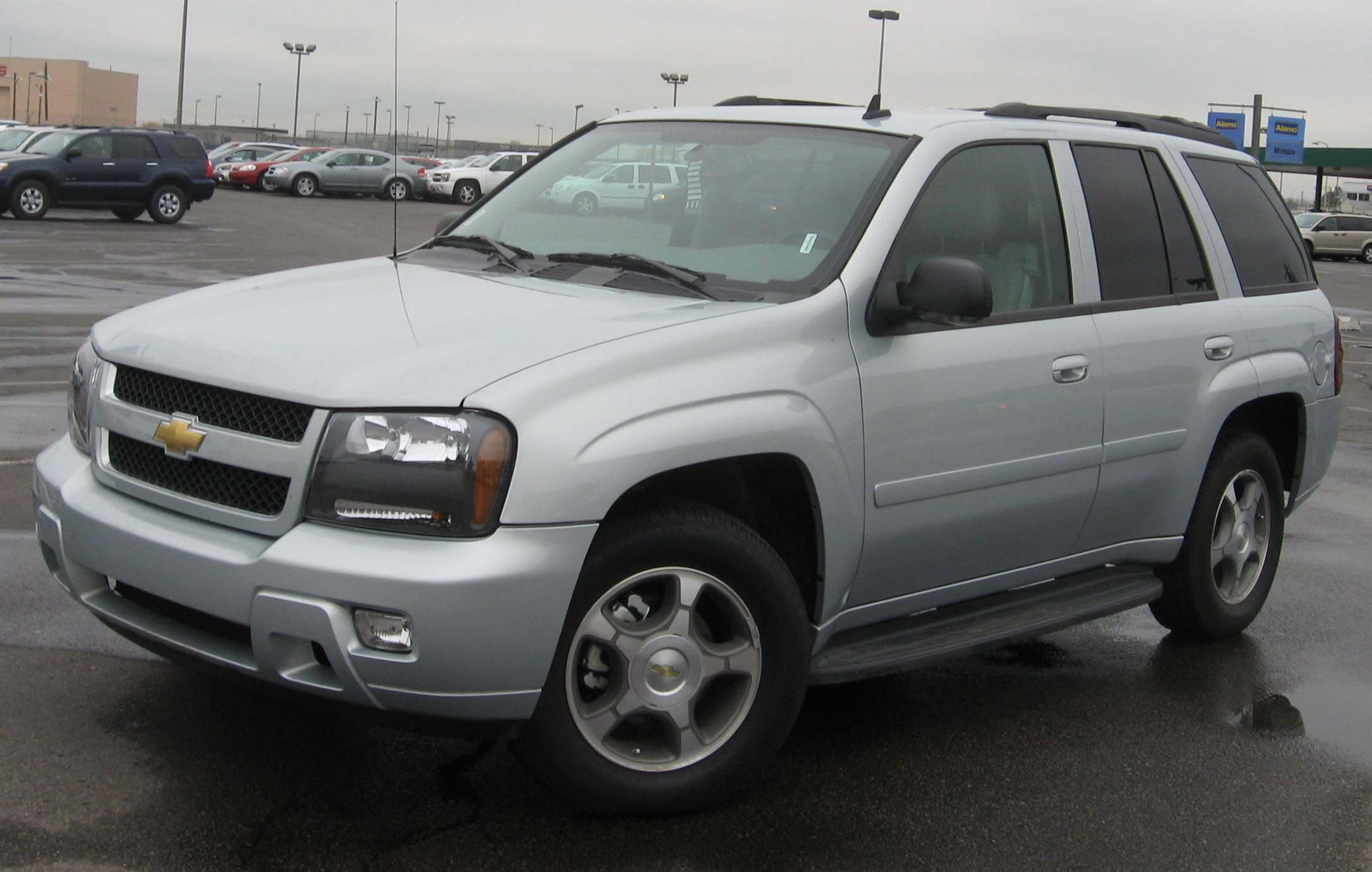
2006–2008 Chevrolet TrailBlazer LT

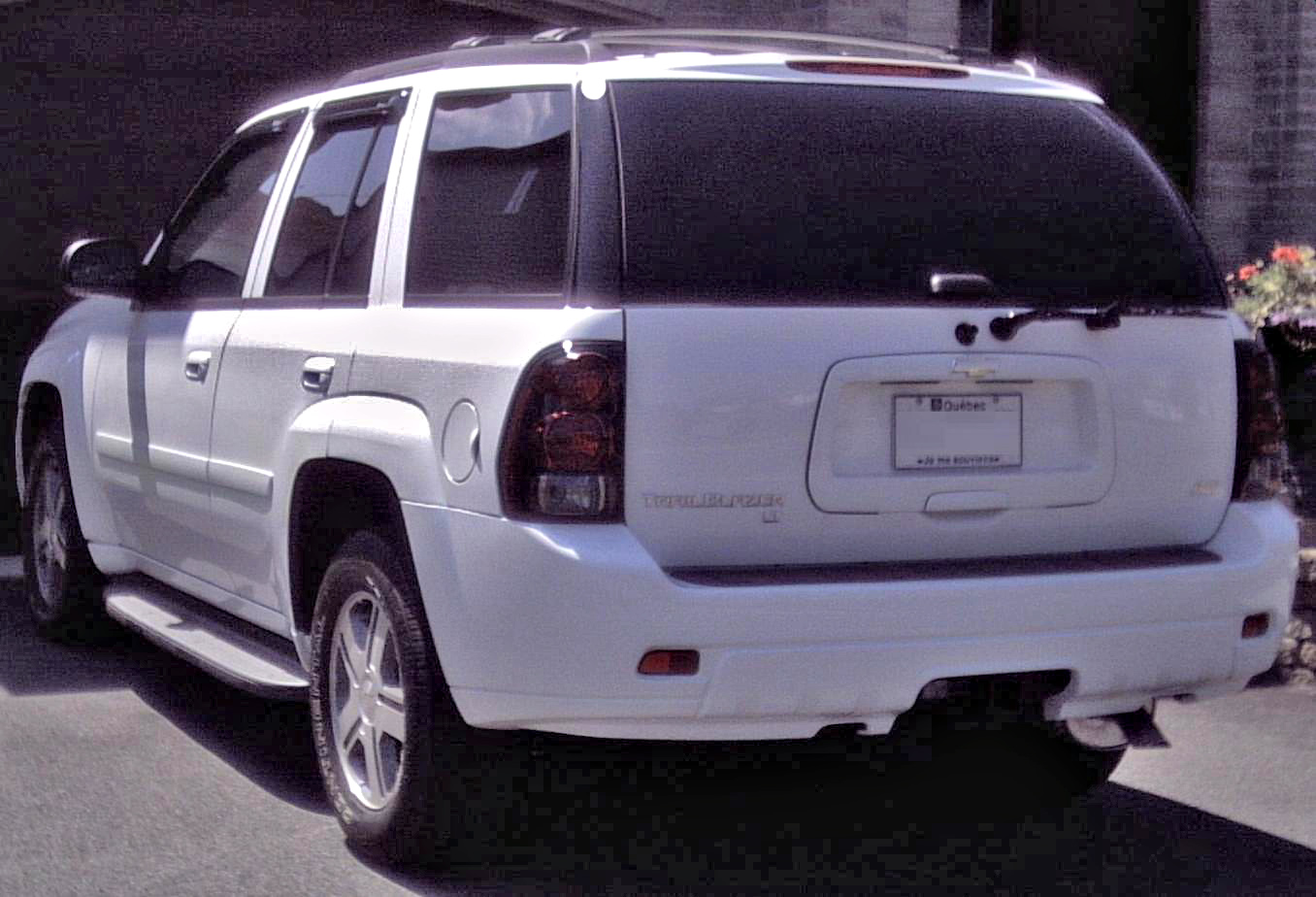
2006–2008 Chevrolet TrailBlazer (rear view)

The TrailBlazer was updated in 2005 for the 2006 model year. An updated front fascia on all models (except for the base version) and new interior trim were included with the refresh. The SS received trim-specific front and rear fascias plus color-matched side skirts.

=== Engines ===
The TrailBlazer came standard with an all-aluminum 4.2L Atlas LL8 inline-six engine that produced up to 203.5 kW (273 hp; 277 PS) and 376 N⋅m (277 lb⋅ft) of torque, or an optional aluminum LM4 5.3L V8 engine producing up to 225 kW (302 hp; 306 PS) and 447 N⋅m (330 lb⋅ft) of torque. The inline-six engine option made the TrailBlazer the most powerful six-cylinder SUV in its class at the time of production. The Active Fuel Management system on the LH6 5.3L V8 engine shuts off four of the eight cylinders during highway travel and idle to conserve fuel. The inline-six versions of the TrailBlazer produce up to 20 miles per US gallon (12 L/100 km; 24 mpg_{‑imp}) on the highway, according to United States Environmental Protection Agency estimates.

The TrailBlazer won the North American Truck of the Year award in 2002. The 4.2L engine appeared on the Ward's 10 Best Engines list from 2002 to 2005 with innovative features such as DOHC, variable valve timing on the exhaust camshaft, and GM's patented lost-foam casting process.

- 2002–2009 LL8 4.2L I6
- 2003–2004 LM4 5.3L V8
- 2005–2009 LH6 5.3L V8
- 2006–2009 LS2 6.0L V8

=== Trim levels ===
Throughout its production run, the TrailBlazer was available in several different trim levels.

The LS was the base trim level of the TrailBlazer, and included a plentiful amount of standard equipment, including aluminum-alloy wheels, four-wheel disc brakes, the 4.2L Vortec inline six-cylinder gasoline engine, a four-speed automatic transmission, cloth seating surfaces, a full-size, matching spare tire with black-painted steel spare wheel, an AM/FM stereo with single-disc CD player, a six-speaker audio system, power windows, door locks, and mirrors, keyless entry, a 65/35 split-folding rear bench seat, dual-zone climate control, cruise control, and a Driver's Information Center. Optional features included a combination cassette and single-disc CD player or a six-disc CD player, a power front driver's seat, a security system, satellite radio (later models), and OnStar.

The LT was the mid-level trim of the TrailBlazer, and added further convenience items to the base LS trim, including upgraded aluminum-alloy wheels, a power front driver's seat, a security system, and a leather-wrapped steering wheel. Optional features included a Bose six-speaker premium amplified audio system, a combination cassette and single-disc CD player or a six-disc, in-dash CD changer, luxury leather-trimmed seating surfaces, dual heated front bucket seats, a power front passenger's seat, a driver's memory system for front driver's seat, mirrors, and radio pre-set settings, a power moonroof, a rear DVD entertainment system by Panasonic (newer models), polished aluminum-alloy wheels, OnStar, a touch-screen radio with a GPS navigation system (later models), and a universal garage door opener system with travel note recorder.

The LTZ was the top-of-the-line trim level of the TrailBlazer, and added further luxury features to the already well-equipped LT trim, including a Bose six-speaker premium amplified audio system, a six-disc, in-dash CD changer, luxury leather-trimmed seating surfaces, dual heated front bucket seats, OnStar, a universal garage door opener system with travel note recorder, a power moonroof, and upgraded interior trim. The LTZ was also offered with a North Face Edition package like the Chevy Avalanche with unique interior and exterior trim. Additional options included polished aluminum-alloy wheels, a touch-screen radio with a GPS navigation system (later models), and a rear DVD entertainment system by Panasonic. This trim was only offered for the 2002 and 2003 model years.

The SS, introduced for the 2006 model year, was the performance-oriented model of the TrailBlazer, and was based on either the LS or LT trim, depending on the equipment package selected (see the specific models above for standard and optional equipment, which is identical to those trim levels). The differences included unique interior trim, unique polished aluminum-alloy wheels, a unique leather-wrapped steering wheel with an "SS" center emblem, "SS" emblems on the polished wheel center caps, "SS" embroidery for both front bucket seats, unique premium cloth or luxury leather-trimmed seating surfaces, a 4L70E transmission, and a 6.0L LS2 V8 gasoline engine.

=== EXT ===
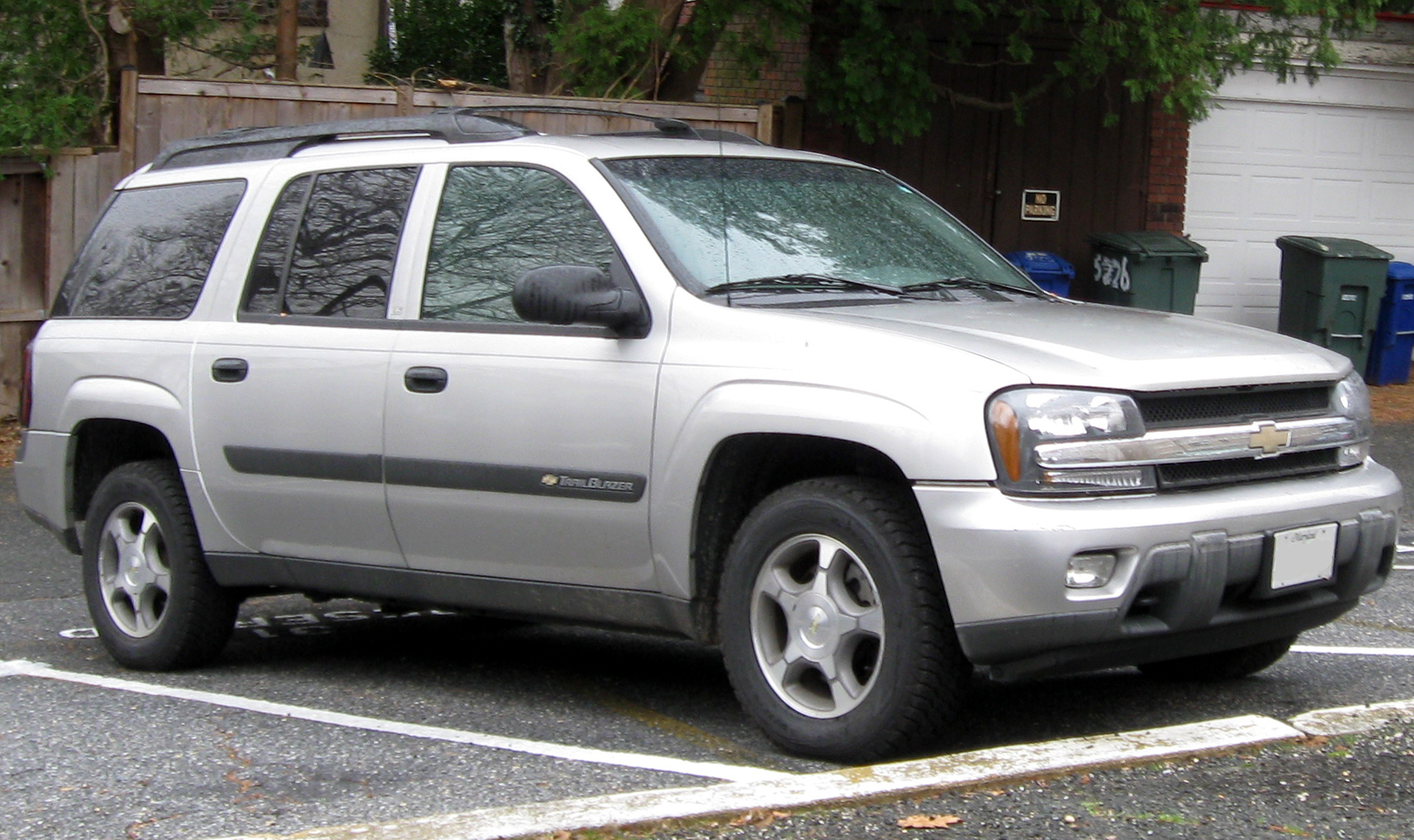
2002–2004 Chevrolet TrailBlazer EXT

The TrailBlazer was also available as a 3-row, 7-passenger EXT version. This vehicle was 410 mm (16 in) longer and had a higher roofline in the rear to allow easier access to the third row of seats. Chevrolet disguised the higher roofline using roof racks. The TrailBlazer EXT platform was given the internal designation GMT370, which was shared with the GMC Envoy XL and Isuzu Ascender LWB; long-wheelbase versions of the Oldsmobile Bravada, Buick Rainier, and Saab 9-7X were never offered.

Production of the EXT model was handled by the Oklahoma City Assembly plant in Oklahoma City, Oklahoma. The last TrailBlazer EXT rolled off the assembly line on February 20, 2006, because GM had reportedly closed that plant, making 2006 the final year for the TrailBlazer EXT.

The EXT could be identified by its much straighter rear doors, which do not extend into the rear wheel arches.

=== SS ===
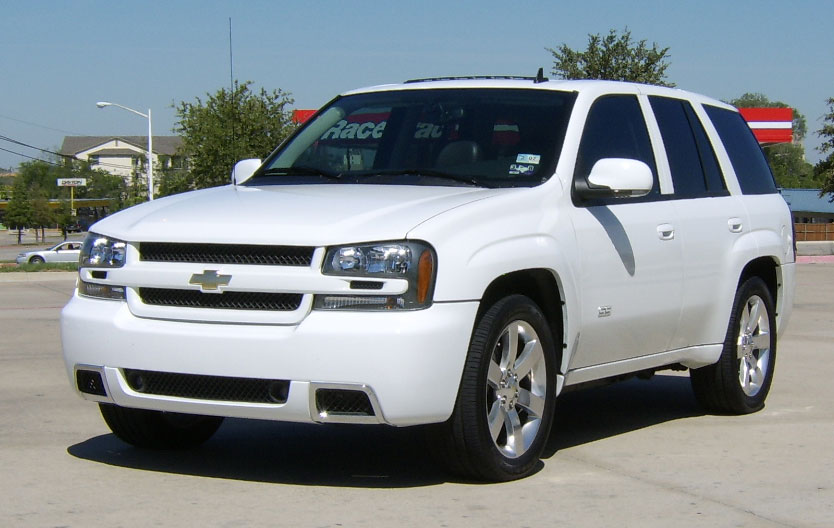
2006 Chevrolet TrailBlazer SS

An SS model was introduced for the 2006 model year. This was the first time a production SUV wore the Super Sport badge, which was first introduced with the 1961 Impala. The TrailBlazer SS came standard with a 6.0L LS2 V8 engine which produced up to 395 bhp and 400 lb-ft (540 nm) of torque, the same standard engine as the 2005–2007 C6 Corvette, except with different exhaust (more restrictive) and a taller intake manifold to better use the engine's torque characteristics in the much heavier body. The suspension was stiffened and lowered from the factory, with an air-leveling system in the rear, and rode on 20 in (510 mm) wheels wearing 255 mm (10.0 in) wide tires—all which contributed to much improved handling. The TrailBlazer SS also came with a 4.10 rear axle ratio, improving off-the-line acceleration, and was available in both rear-wheel-drive and all-wheel-drive configurations. About 1.7% of total TrailBlazer production had the SS package (Regular Production Option code B4U).

Calendar Year	Total TrailBlazer SS Sales
2006	9,361
2007	10,726
2008	5,744
2009	610
Total	26,441

=== Safety ===
IIHS tests in early 2009 gave early TrailBlazers an Acceptable overall rating in the frontal offset test, while 2005–2009 models received an Acceptable rating. For 2008 models, side-curtain airbags became standard. At that time, the TrailBlazer received a Marginal overall side impact rating, tested with optional side airbags present. Torso-type side airbags were not available then.

2007 National Highway Traffic Safety Administration (NHTSA) Crash Test Ratings:

- Frontal Driver:
- Frontal Passenger:
- Side Driver:
- Side Rear Passenger:
- Rollover 2wd:
- Rollover 4wd:

=== Yearly American sales ===
Calendar Year	Total American sales
2001	115,103
2002	249,568
2003	261,334
2004	283,484
2005	244,150
2006	178,493
2007	151,985
2008	119,905
2009	22,287
Total	1,626,309

=== Discontinuation ===
The next-generation TrailBlazer was to be built on an upgraded version of the current GMT360 platform called the GMT361. It was scheduled to be launched in spring 2007, but in January 2006, GM decided to refresh the current platform under the code GMT360NG. However, in June 2006, GM announced that the GMT360NG platform had been cancelled because of high development costs. GM decided to keep the current TrailBlazer until the 2009 model year (2008 in Mexico).

Buick instead had the Enclave, a GM Lambda platform–based crossover SUV to replace the Rainier (along with the Rendezvous and the Terraza minivan), while GMC had the GM Theta platform–based crossover SUV Terrain to replace the Envoy. Saab replaced the 9-7X with the Cadillac SRX–based 9-4X, which was discontinued only nine months after its introduction as a result of Saab's bankruptcy.

The TrailBlazer was replaced by the Traverse in 2009. GM had closed the Moraine plant on December 23, 2008, ending production of all GMT360 products. The last TrailBlazer rolled off the Moraine line on December 16, 2008, a week before the plant's closure. The closing of the last factory that manufactured the SUVs was the subject of a 2009 HBO documentary The Last Truck: Closing of a GM Plant.

=== Recall ===
In 2012, General Motors and Isuzu recalled more than 258,000 SUVs in the U.S. and Canada to fix short-circuits in power window and door lock switches that could cause fires. The recall covered TrailBlazer, Envoy, Rainier, Ascender, and 9-7X SUVs from the 2006 and 2007 model years. The SUVs were sold or registered in 20 U.S. states, Washington, D.C., and Canada, where salt and other chemicals are used to clear roads in the winter.

== Second generation (RG; 2011) ==
Second generation
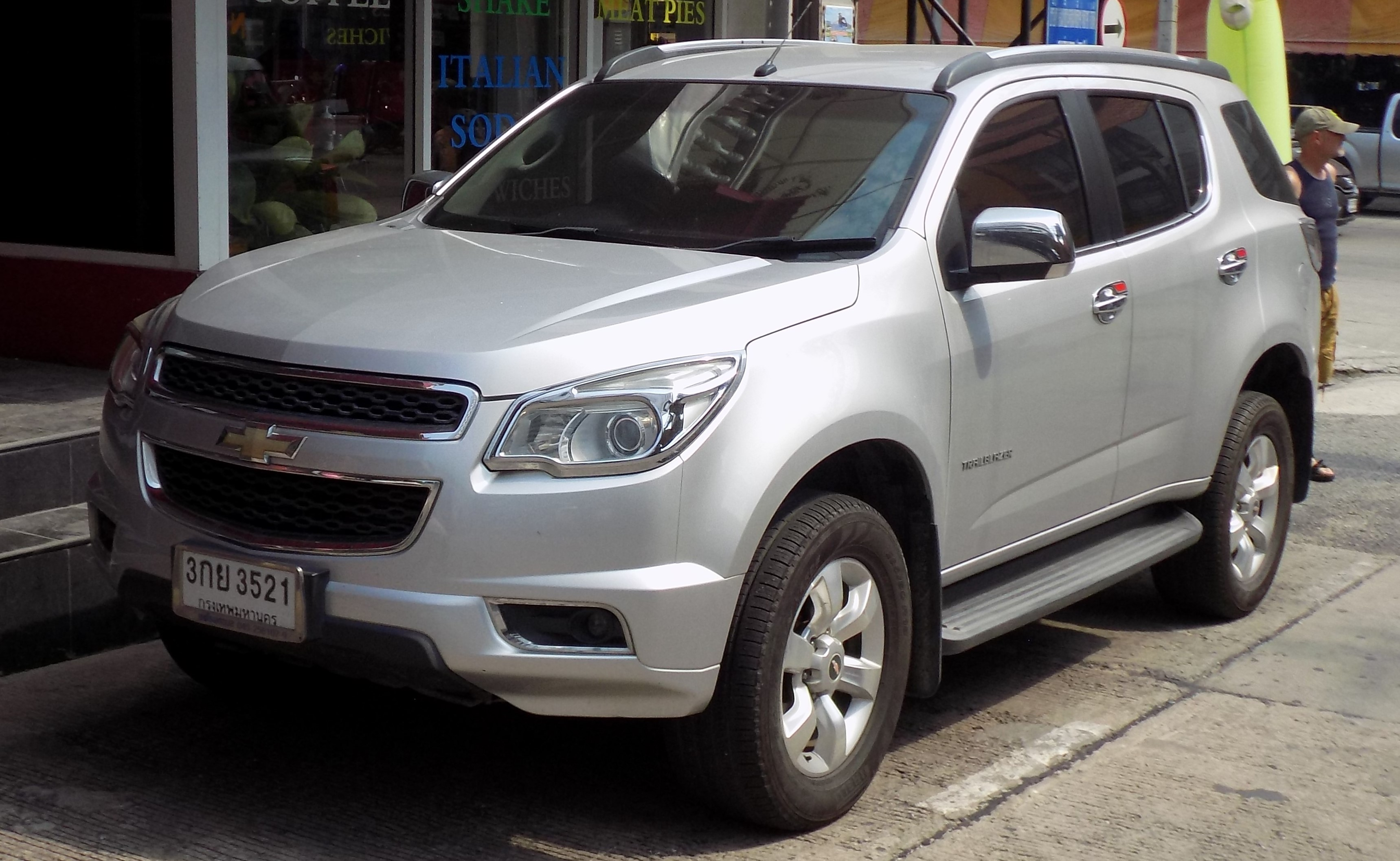

Overview
- Also called: Holden Colorado 7 (Australia and New Zealand, 2012–2016); Holden Trailblazer (Australia and New Zealand, 2016–2020)
- Production: 2011–present (South America); 2012–2020 (Thailand); 2013–2015 (Russia)
- Assembly: Thailand: Rayong (GM Thailand); Brazil: São José dos Campos (GM do Brasil); India: Halol, Gujarat (GM India); Russia: St. Petersburg (SKD)

Body and chassis
- Platform: GMT31XX
- Related: Chevrolet Colorado; Isuzu MU-X (RF)

Powertrain
- Engine: Gasoline: 3.6 L LFX V6; Diesel: 2.5 L Duramax I4-T; 2.8 L Duramax I4-T
- Power output: 110–132.5 kW (148–178 hp; 150–180 PS) (2.5 L); 132.5–147 kW (178–197 hp; 180–200 PS) (2.8 L); 178–208 kW (239–279 hp; 242–283 PS) (3.6 L)
- Transmission: 6-speed manual; 6-speed automatic

Dimensions
- Wheelbase: 2,845 mm (112.0 in)
- Length: 4,887–4,952 mm (192.4–195.0 in)
- Width: 2,132 mm (83.9 in)
- Height: 1,848–1,852 mm (72.8–72.9 in)

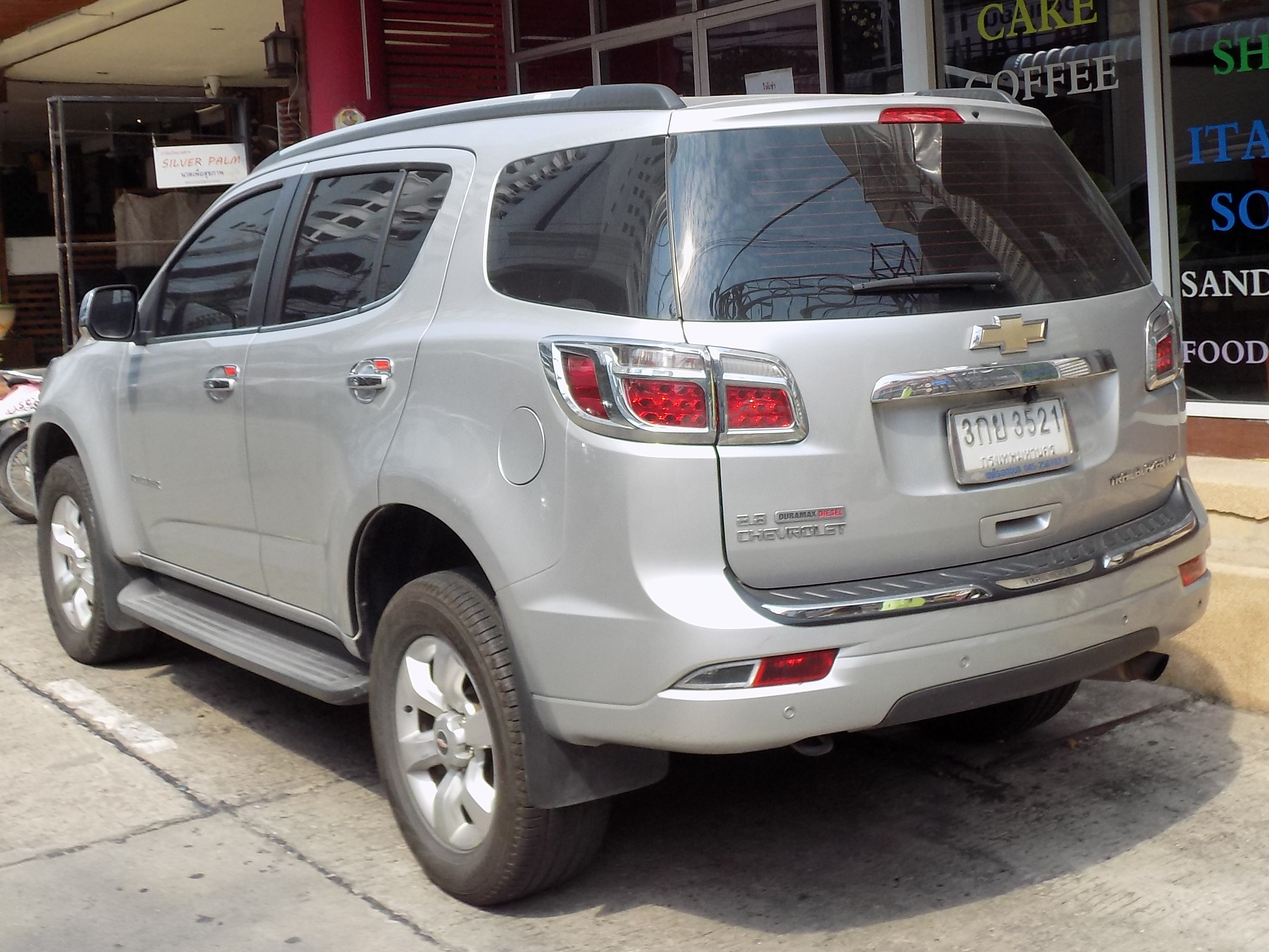
Rear (pre-facelift)

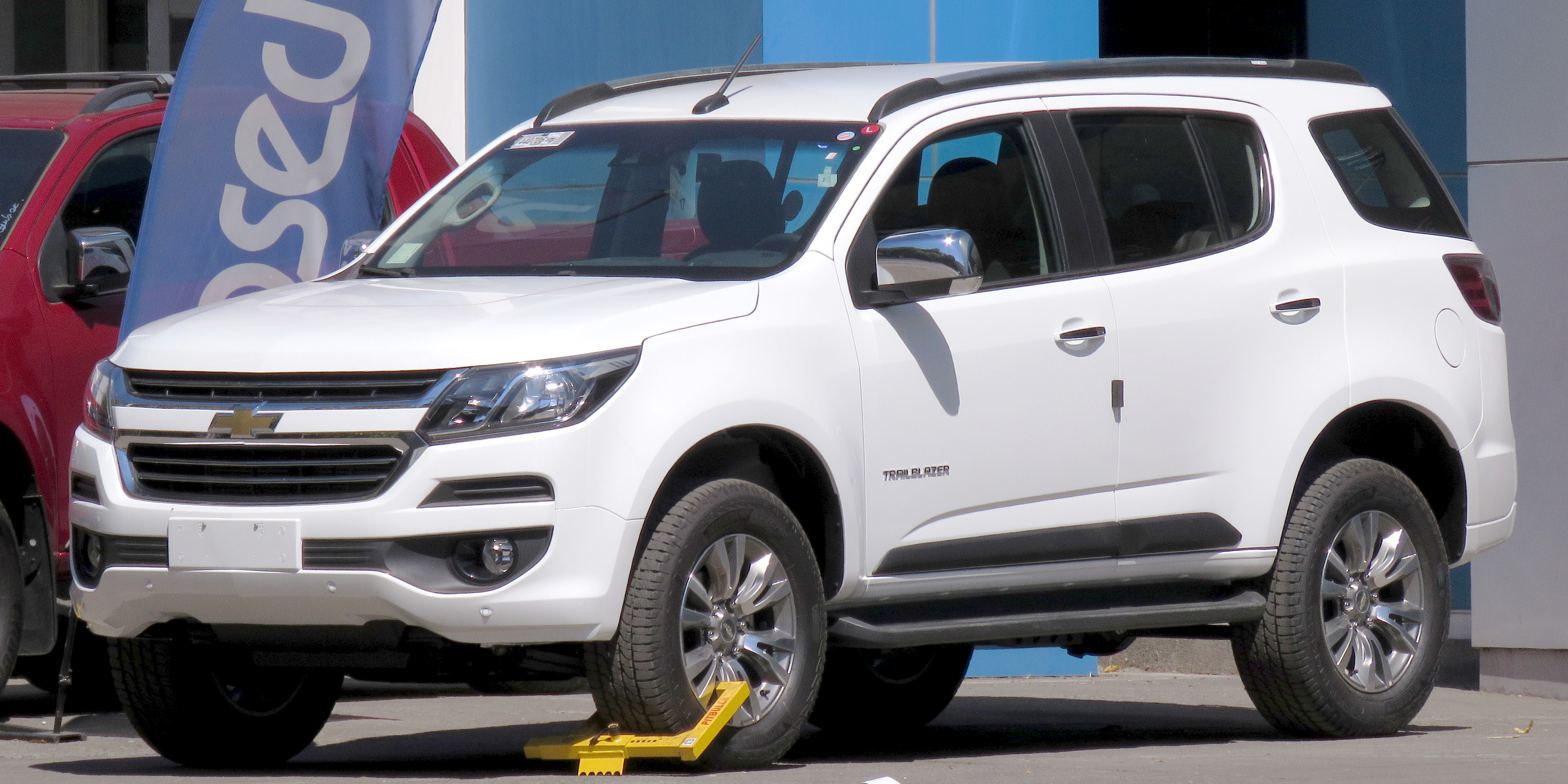
First facelift

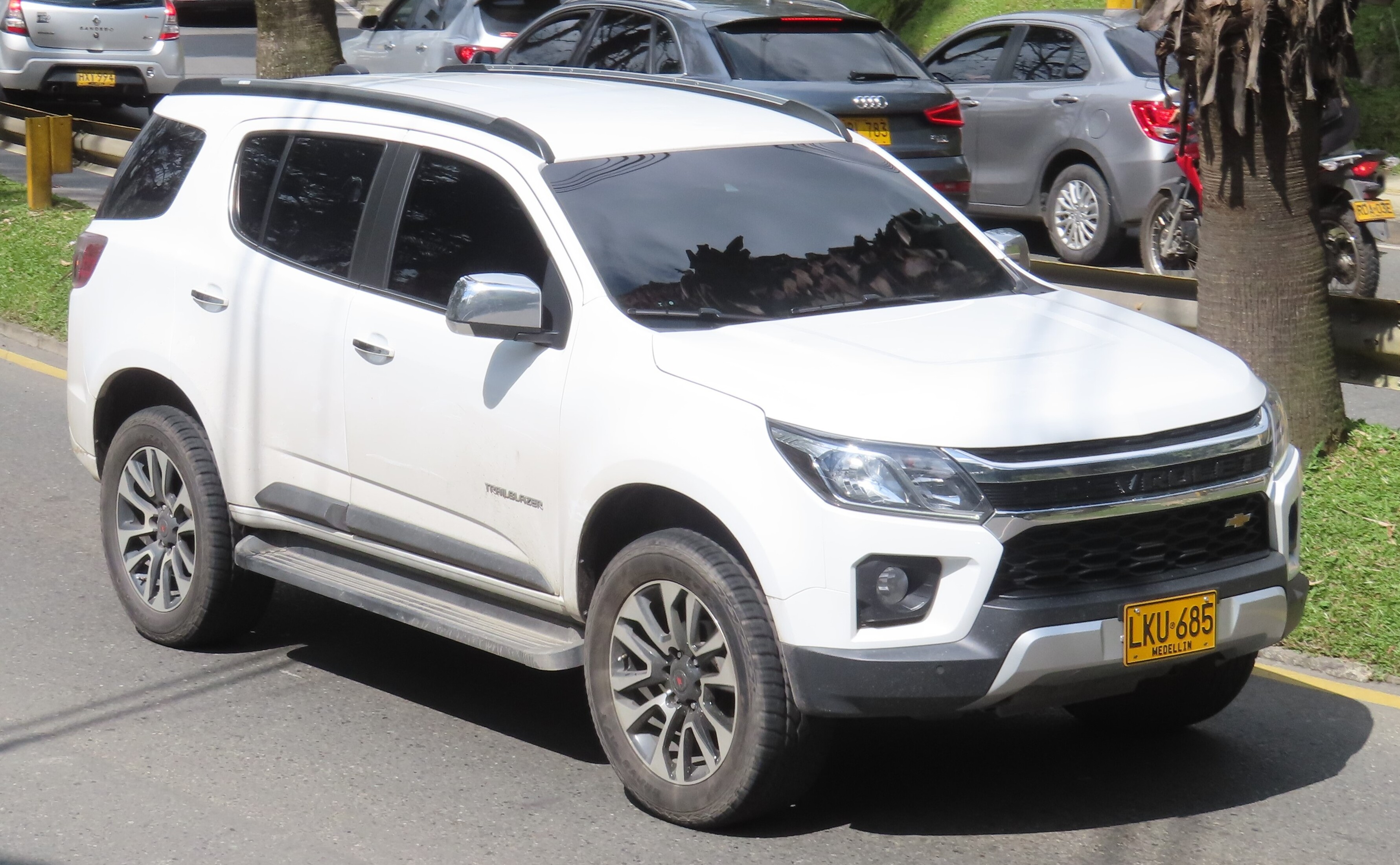
Second facelift

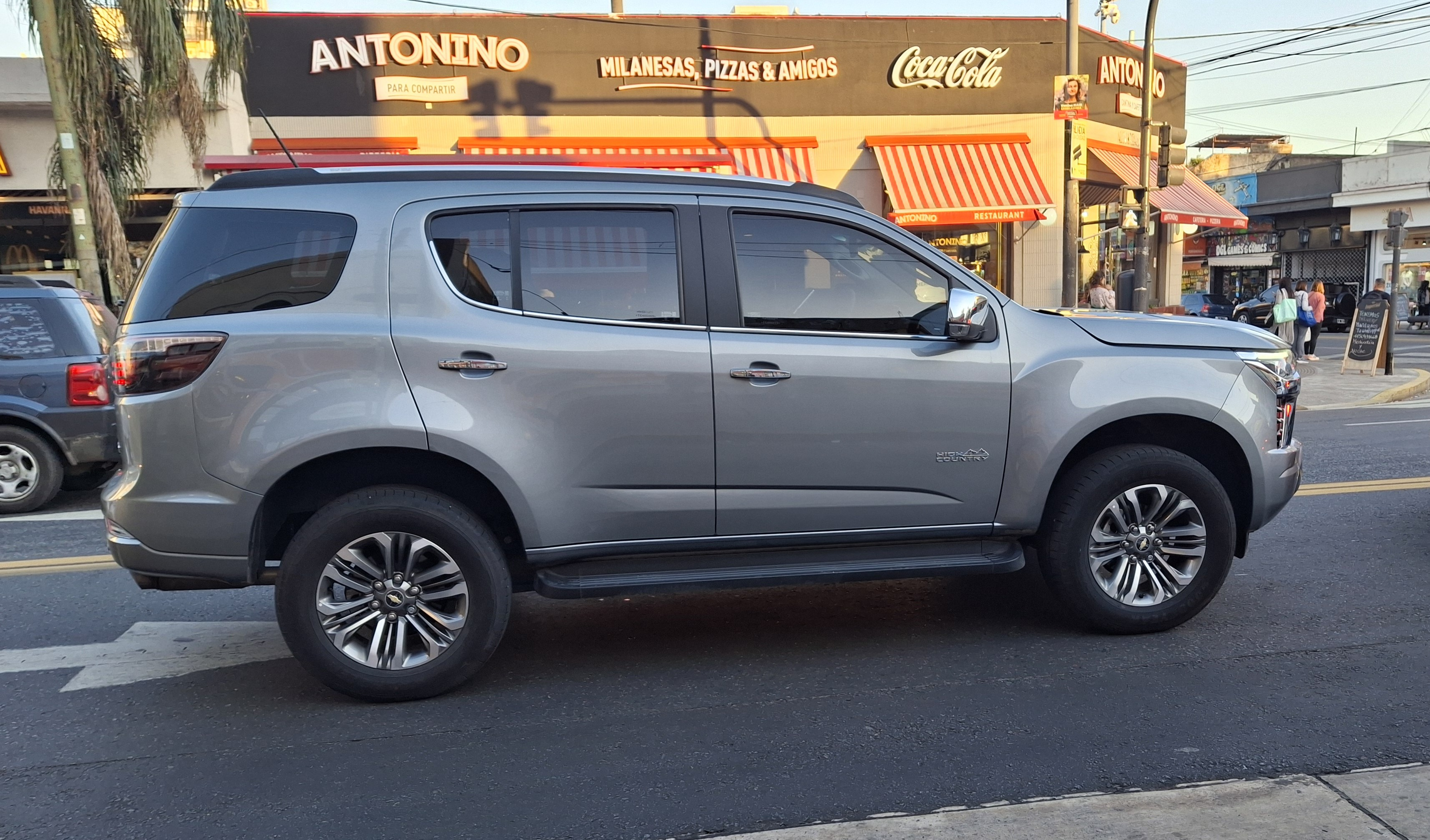
Third facelift with updated alloys

The second generation (stylized as Trailblazer instead of TrailBlazer) was unveiled as a concept at the 2011 Dubai Motor Show, and as a production model at the Bangkok Motor Show on March 21, 2012. As is the case with the original K5 Blazer (1969–1994), Tahoe (since 1995), Suburban (since 1935), and S-10 Blazer (1983–2005), the second-generation Trailblazer is based on a truck frame, namely the second-generation Colorado. The bodywork from the A-pillar back is entirely different as it takes the form of an SUV with an enclosed roof, tailgate and three rows of seats. Unlike the Colorado, the rear suspension is a five-link system connected to coil springs but retains the live axle.

The second generation Trailblazer is built in Thailand and in Brazil. It was also sold in some of the Southeast Asian countries, India, South Africa, and the Middle East, and also sold in Australia as the Holden Colorado 7 from 2012 to 2016, and being rebadged as the Trailblazer in 2017. The first-generation Isuzu MU-X also shared the platform with the second-generation Trailblazer.

The third-facelift was unveiled on 17 April 2024.

=== Engines ===
The second generation Trailblazer comes with three engine options, two of them are diesels, one featuring a Duramax 2.5 L that produces 110–132.5 kW (148–178 hp; 150–180 PS) and 350–440 N⋅m (260–320 lb⋅ft) of torque as standard, and an optional Duramax 2.8 L that produces 132.5–147 kW (178–197 hp; 180–200 PS) and 470–500 N⋅m (350–370 lb⋅ft) of torque. For the Brazilian, South African, and Middle Eastern markets, the 3.6 L V6 gasoline engine option that produces 178 kW (239 hp; 242 PS) (in the Brazilian market, the 2015 version producing 208 kW (279 hp; 283 PS)) and 360 N⋅m (270 lb⋅ft) of torque is also available.

The 2.8 L diesel engine have several new parts, namely a water-cooled variable-geometry turbocharger, high-pressure common-rail fuel delivery system, exhaust gas recirculation (EGR) system, intake manifold, cylinder head, cylinder block, balance shaft unit, and Engine Control Module (ECM).

=== Holden Colorado 7/Trailblazer ===
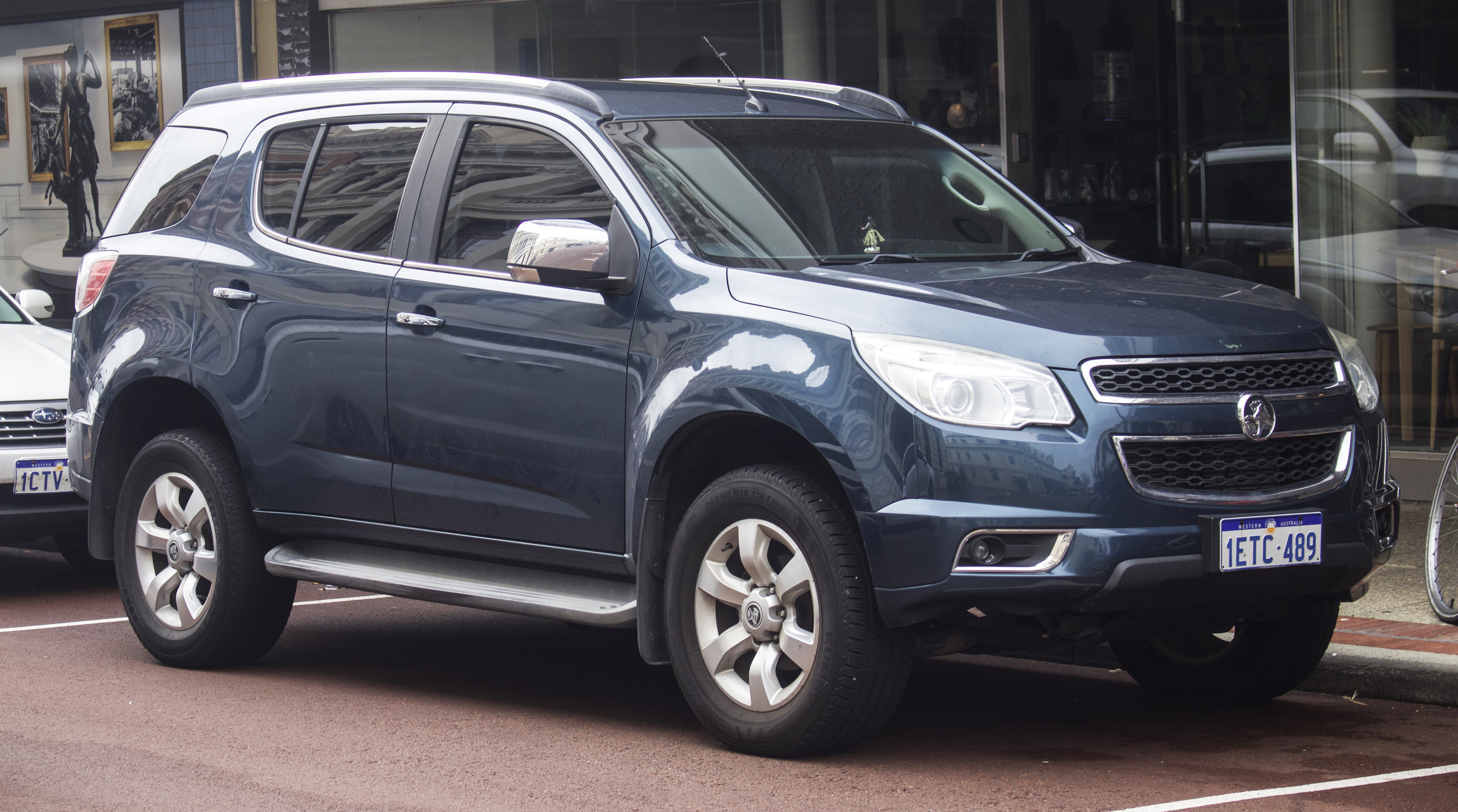
Holden Colorado 7

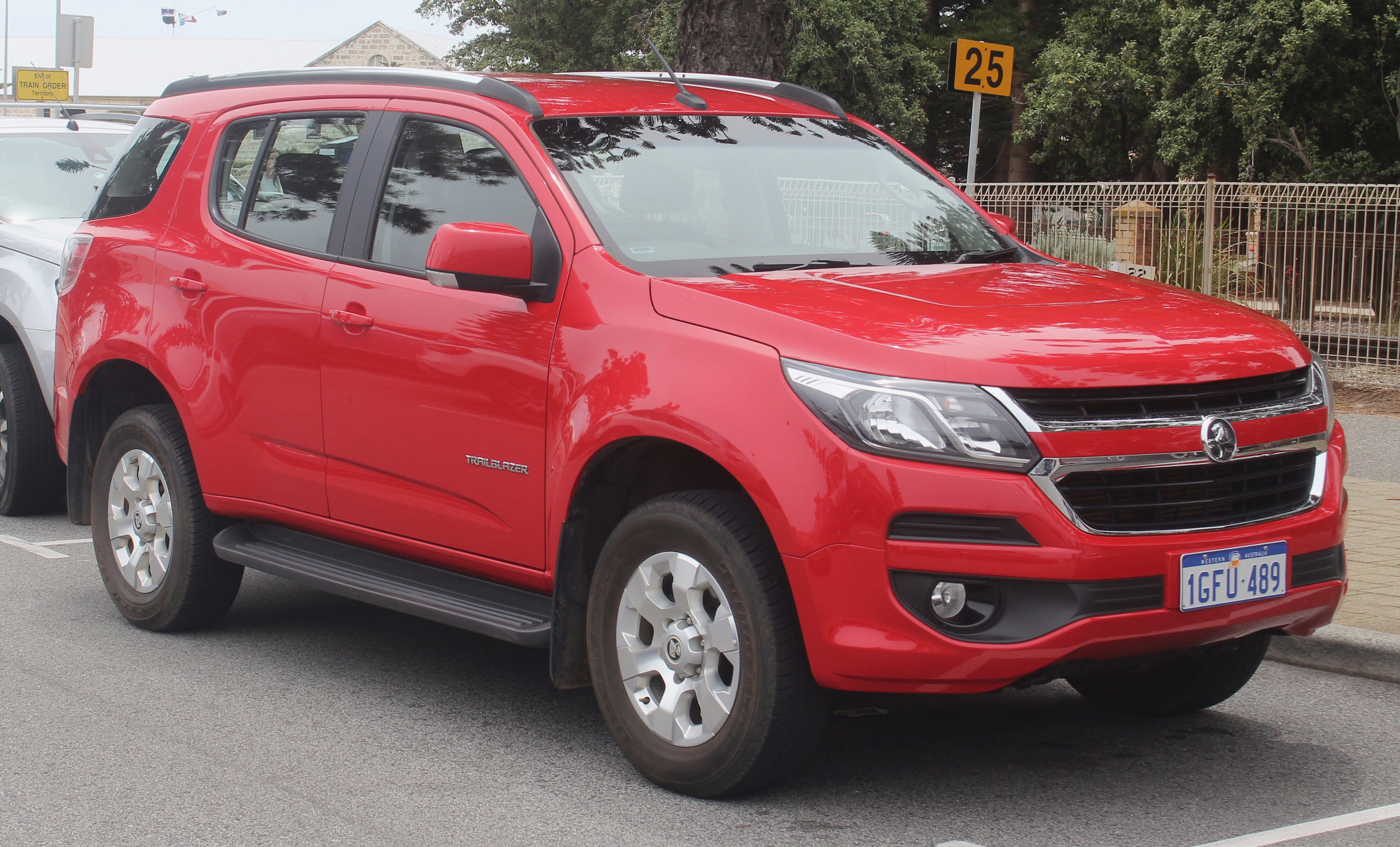
Holden Trailblazer (facelift)

The Trailblazer was sold in Australia since 2012 as the Holden Colorado 7. The range consists of two trim levels; LT and LTZ. Standard equipment for all Colorado 7s includes cruise control, body-colored bumpers, side steps, front fog lights, aluminum roof rails, rear parking sensors (in addition to the rear camera), Bluetooth phone connectivity, USB input, roof mounted climate control vents for second and third rows, and a leather-wrapped steering wheel with multifunction controls. The LTZ adds 18-inch wheels, projector headlights, exterior chrome highlights, leather seats, a premium sounds system, a six-way adjustable driver's seat, higher grade interior trim elements, and LED tail-lights. The Colorado 7 is powered by the same VM Motori 2.8 L turbo-diesel engine as the Colorado.

At its first model update in 2016, the Colorado 7 was renamed to Trailblazer.

=== Sales ===
Year	Brazil	Thailand
2012	283	
2013	3,285	
2014	2,285	2,855
2015	1,790	1,592
2016	1,943	1,185
2017	3,281	1,150
2018	3,854	2,196
2019	3,363	3,091
2020	2,823	672
2021	3,324	
2022	3,210	
2023	1,659	
2024	2,061	

=== Safety ===
ANCAP test results* Holden Colorado 7 all variants (2012)
Test	Score
Overall	5 /5 stars
Frontal offset	15.09/16
Side impact	16/16
Pole	2/2
Seat belt reminders	2/3
Whiplash protection	Good
Pedestrian protection	Adequate
Electronic stability control	Standard

ANCAP test results* Holden Trailblazer all variants (2016)
Test	Score
Overall	5 /5 stars
Frontal offset	13.89/16
Side impact	16/16
Pole	2/2
Seat belt reminders	2.6/3
Whiplash protection	Good
Pedestrian protection	Good
Electronic stability control	Standard
