= General Motors Thailand =

Holding company of GM

General Motors (Thailand) Limited
- Company type: Subsidiary
- Industry: Automotive
- Founded: 1993
- Defunct: 2020; 6 years ago
- Fate: Ceased production and sales
- Successor: Great Wall Motors Thailand (physical plant)
- Headquarters: Pluak Daeng, Rayong, Thailand; Bangkok, Thailand
- Products: Automobiles; Internal combustion engines
- Production output: 1,361,000 vehicles and 500,000 powertrains (total per August 2019)
- Brands: Chevrolet; Saab; Holden (export)
- Number of employees: 1,900 (February 2020)
- Parent: General Motors (100%)
- Subsidiaries: General Motors Powertrain (Thailand) Limited; Chevrolet Sales (Thailand) Limited
- Website: chevrolet.co.th

General Motors (Thailand) Limited (GMT) was a holding company of sales and manufacturing subsidiaries of General Motors (GM) in Thailand.

The company was registered in 1993 as a sales company, and opened its manufacturing plant in 2000. At its height, GM Thailand exported vehicles to most regions in the world, including South America, Central America, Europe, Africa, the Middle East, Southeast Asia, Australia and Japan.

In February 2020, GM announced that it would withdraw from the Thai market and the Rayong plant would be acquired by Great Wall Motors by the end of 2020. The company continued to support existing Chevrolet owners for ongoing aftersales, warranty and service.

== History ==
General Motors cars, particularly Opel and Holden cars were assembled in Thailand from 1970 through several local assemblers, including Bangchan General Assembly and Asoke Motors. Several models assembled in the era were the Holden Monaro LS, Chevrolet De Ville and Opel Rekord.

In May 1996, General Motors decided to build a manufacturing plant in Eastern Seaboard Industrial Estate in Rayong for its Southeast Asian expansion. Investment to neighbouring Indonesia was ruled out due to the requirement of 60 percent local content imposed by the Indonesian government, while the Thailand government granted GM's request to drop the local content requirement. The site is located right next to AutoAlliance Thailand, a plant jointly owned by fellow Detroit carmaker, Ford Motor Company along with Mazda.

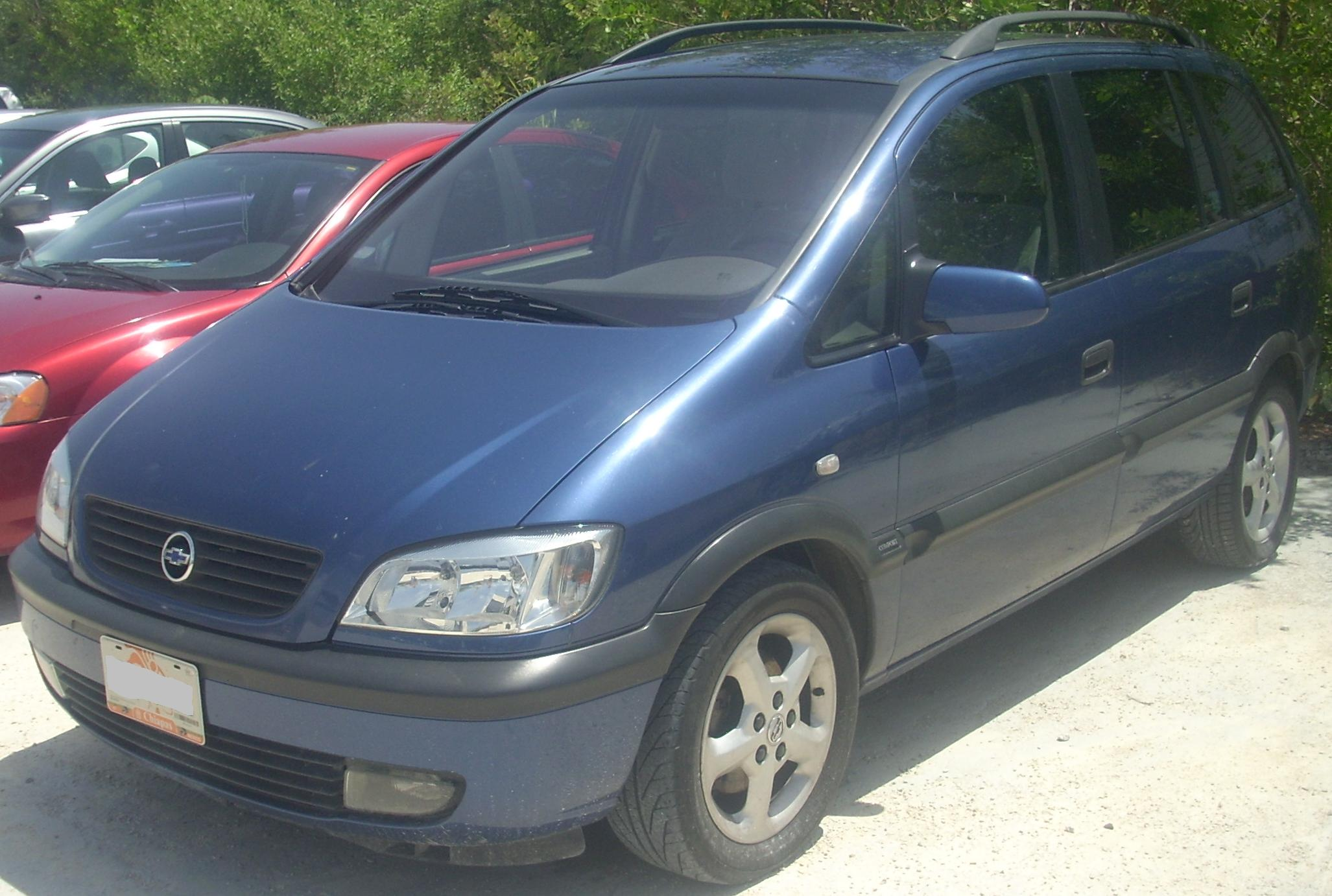
The Chevrolet Zafira was the first product produced by GM Thailand

Modelled after GM's Eisenach plant in Germany, the Rayong plant was scheduled to produce 100,000 to 150,000 vehicles annually, with 80 percent of these to be exported. The plant was opened in May 2000, producing the Chevrolet Zafira. The Zafira was exported to the neighbouring Southeast Asian countries and Mexico, and also exported to Australia as the Holden Zafira and Japan as the Subaru Traviq. By 2002, the Zafira was the number one selling car in Thailand's domestic family wagon segment with 3,946 units sold. Between 2002 and 2004, the plant also assembled the Alfa Romeo 156 under contract with Fiat. The company also imported and distributed Saab vehicles to the country. Starting in 2003, the Holden Commodore was badged as the Chevrolet Lumina in Thailand for the VY and VZ model series. Exports lasted until 2005.

Following GM's acquisition of Daewoo Motors, GM Thailand started manufacturing several Chevrolet-badged Daewoo subcompact and compact passenger cars, starting from the Chevrolet Optra sedan in June 2003, Optra estate in March 2005, and both Aveo sedan and Captiva in June 2007. For one-ton pickups, GM Thailand manufactured the Colorado, an Isuzu-derived pickup from March 2004. It was exported to Australia as the Holden Colorado from 2008.

In August 2008, GM invested US$445 million to build an engine and transmission plant. Located adjacent to the assembly plant, the plant was opened in 2011 as the General Motors Powertrain (Thailand) Limited. It produced the 2.5 L and 2.8 L Duramax diesel engine, later also exported to the United States.

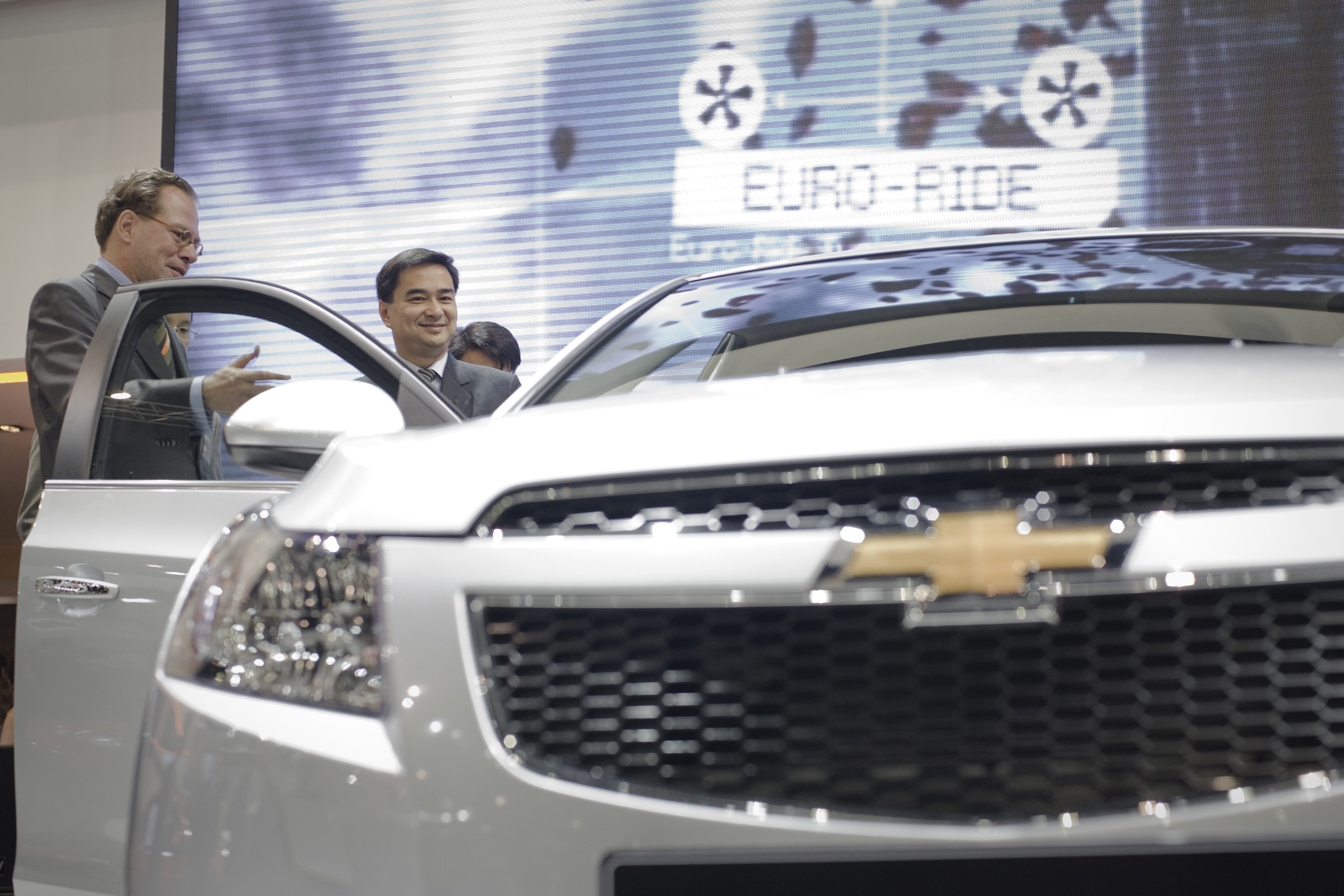
Abhisit Vejjajiva, then prime minister of Thailand, viewing the Chevrolet Cruze at the Motor Expo 2010 held in IMPACT Muang Thong Thani Exhibition Center

After losing market share for years, GM announced a restructuring plan for its Thailand operations in February 2015. The plan included phasing out passenger cars and focusing on SUVs and pickups instead. As a result, the Sonic was discontinued in May 2015 and the Cruze followed in 2017. Later, GM Thailand also stopped production of the Captiva in 2018, leaving the Trailblazer SUV and Colorado pickup in the line-up. GM executives were considering the Trax subcompact SUV to be produced in the country. However, a business case for the Trax could not be justified due to thin margins and low sales forecast. In March 2019, the company announced its plan to market the second generation Captiva in Thailand. It was showcased at the Bangkok International Motor Show 2019 and released to the market in September 2019. Imported from Indonesia, the car is a rebadged Baojun 530/Wuling Almaz.

On 17 February 2020, Andy Dunstan, President of GM Strategic Markets, Alliances and Distributors, announced that Chevrolet would be withdrawn from the Thai domestic vehicle market and GM would cease vehicle and powertrain production at the Rayong manufacturing facilities. Chinese automaker Great Wall Motor agreed to acquire the plant by the end of 2020 to help its expansion in ASEAN. This decision also led to the demise of the Holden brand in Australia and New Zealand, as GM Thailand was the main source of Holden trucks. GM Thailand's last vehicle, a blue Chevrolet Colorado, rolled off the Rayong line in May 2020 as the 934,758th Colorado produced by GM Thailand.

== Products ==
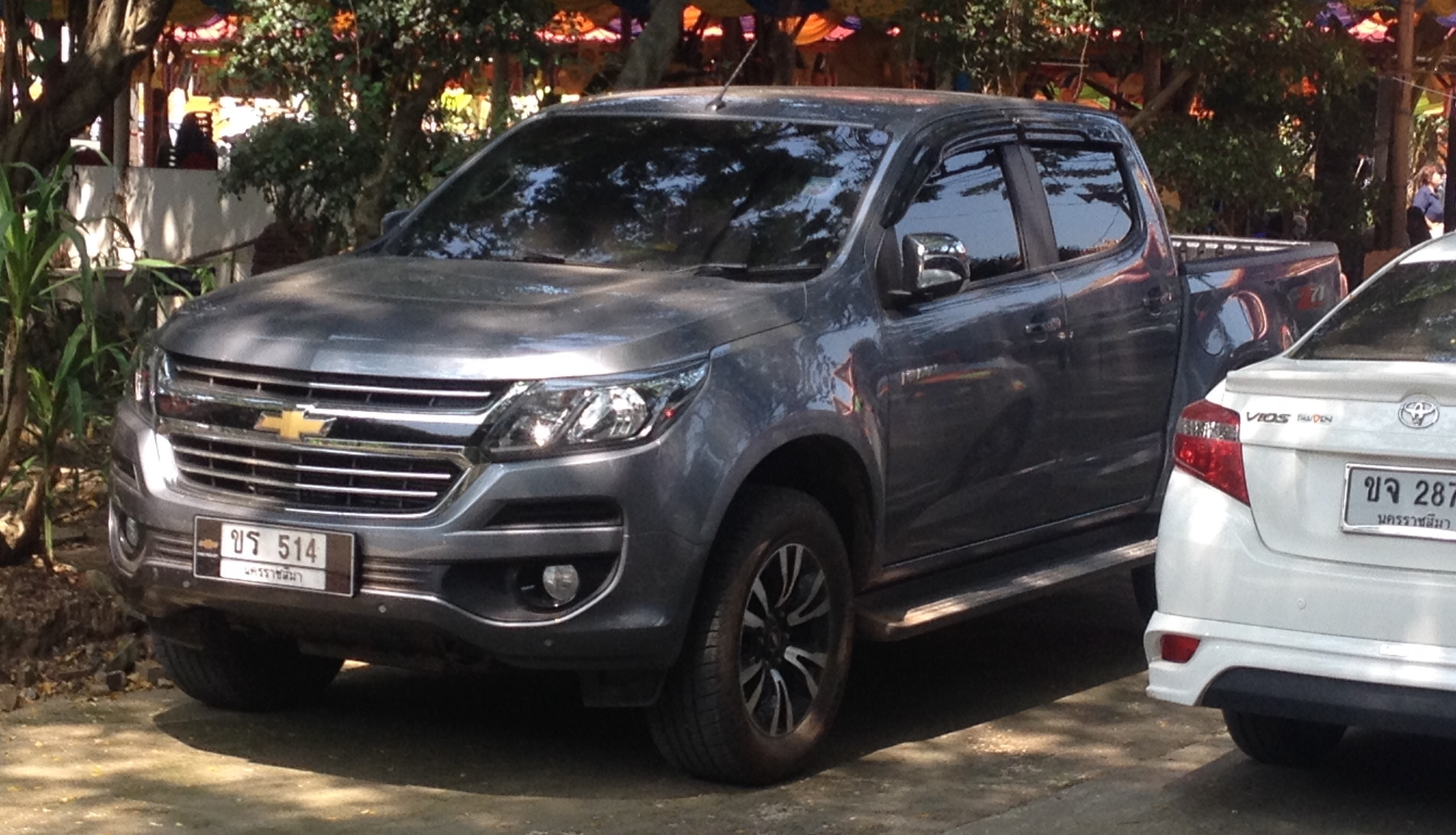
Throughout its operations, GM Thailand had produced 934,758 Colorados.

=== Manufactured locally by GM Thailand ===
- Chevrolet Colorado (2004–2020)
- Chevrolet Trailblazer (2012–2020)
- Chevrolet Captiva (2007–2018)
- Chevrolet Cruze (2010–2017)
- Chevrolet Sonic (2012–2015)
- Chevrolet Aveo (2006–2012)
- Chevrolet Optra (2003–2010)
- Chevrolet Zafira (2000–2007)
- Subaru Traviq (2001–2004)
- Alfa Romeo 156 (2002–2004)

=== Imported ===
- Chevrolet Captiva (2019–2020, imported from SGMW Indonesia)
- Chevrolet Spin (2013–2015, imported from GM Indonesia)
- Chevrolet Lumina (2003–2005, imported from Holden Australia)

== Domestic sales ==
Calendar year	Sales	Rank
2005	33,939	6
2011	31,503	
2014	25,799	8
2015	17,456	9
2016	14,931	9
2017	18,771	9
2018	20,313	10
2019	15,161	10
