= Covini C6W =

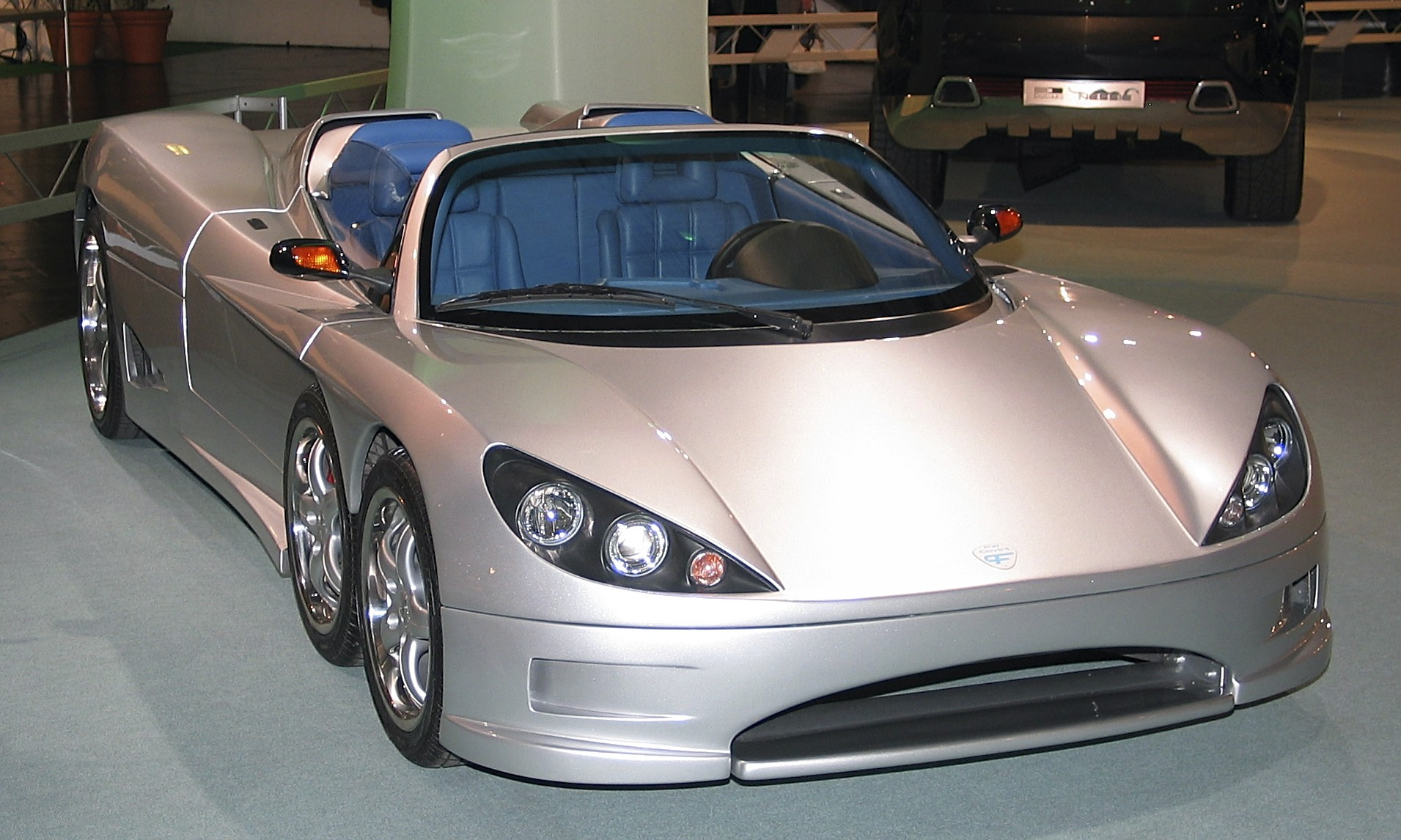

Overview
- Manufacturer: Covini Engineering
- Production: March 2, 2004 – September 30, 2016
- Designer: Ferruccio Covini

Body and chassis
- Class: Sports car (S)
- Body style: 2-door coupé
- Layout: RMR layout

Powertrain
- Engine: 4.2 L Audi V8
- Transmission: 6-speed manual

Dimensions
- Wheelbase: 2,750 mm (108.3 in)
- Length: 4,180 mm (164.6 in)
- Width: 1,990 mm (78.3 in)
- Height: 1,080 mm (42.5 in)
- Curb weight: 1,150 kg (2,535 lb) (dry weight)

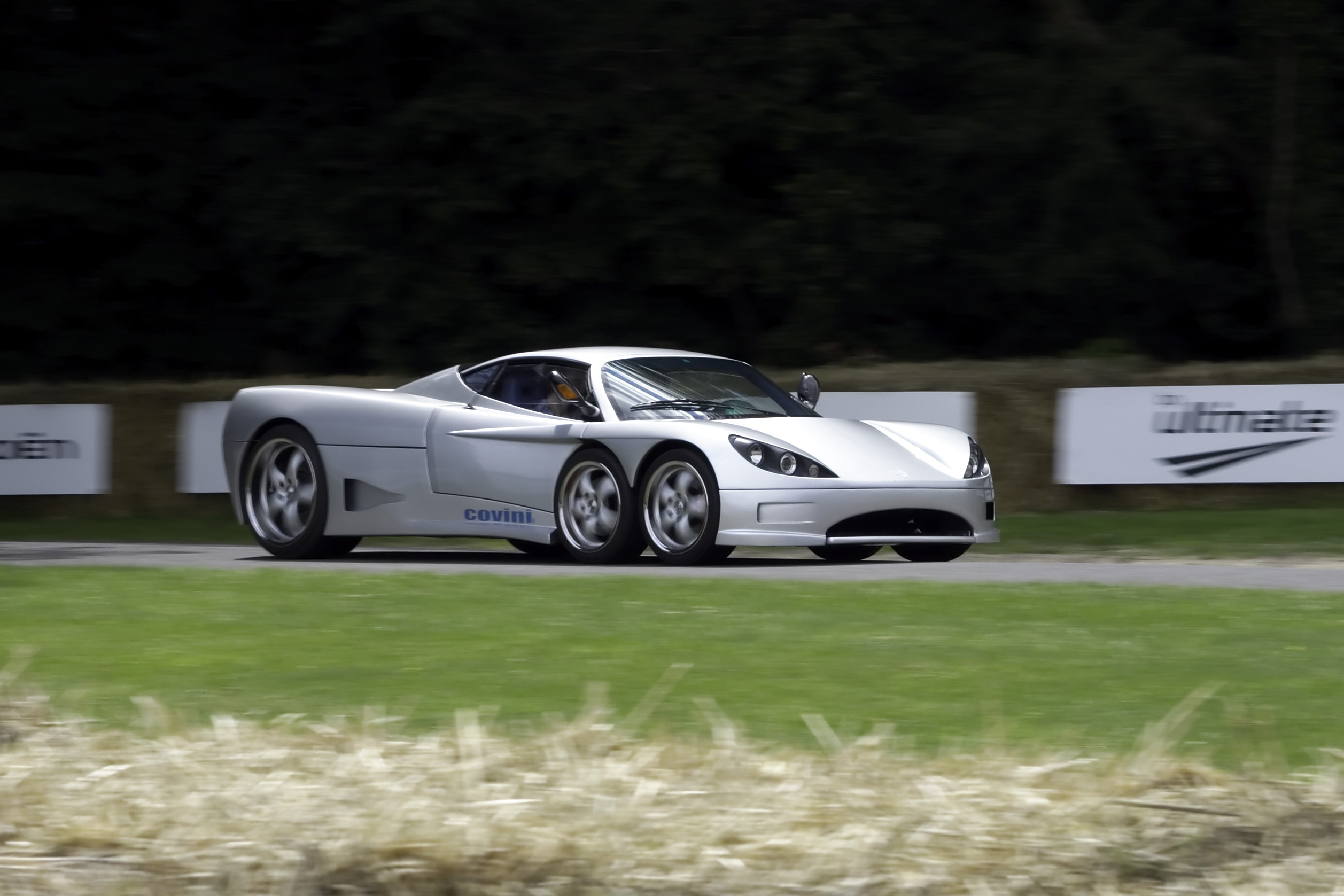
C6W on track

The Covini C6W is an Italian 2-seat 2-door sports coupé with a removable roof section. Inspiration for the car was taken from the 1976 Tyrrell P34, which had two pairs of smaller front wheels, a principle applied to the C6W. The project was started in 1974, but abandoned shortly after, and left dormant into the 1980s due to the lack of availability of low-profile tires at the time. In 2003, the project was revived and in 2004, the C6W was shown in prototype form. In 2005, a slightly revised version debuted at the Salon International de l'Auto, featuring new wheels, new roof structure and a refreshed interior, and went into limited production of 6-8 cars per year, as a result of a tie-up between PMI and Covini Engineering. The car features a mid-mounted 4.2L V8 engine and has a top speed of 186 mph (299 km/h).

== Construction ==
- Construction: Fiberglass and carbon fiber body over tubular steel frame
- Front brakes: Brembo disc brakes, with ABS
- Engine: 4.2 L (256.3 in³) naturally aspirated Audi V8
- Fuel feed: Direct petrol injection
- Maximum power: 440 PS (324 kW; 434 hp) at 6400 rpm
- Maximum torque: 470 N⋅m (347 lb⋅ft) at 2700 rpm

== See also ==
- Panther 6
- Tyrrell P34

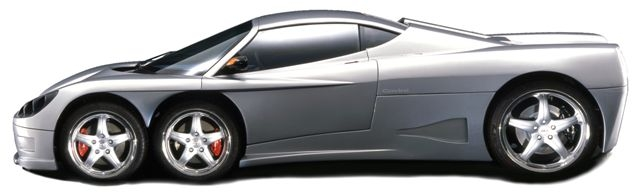
Side view
