= Covini Engineering =

Coordinates: 45.063251°N 9.440114°E

- Industry: Car manufacturing
- Founded: 1978; 48 years ago
- Founder: Ferruccio Covini
- Headquarters: Castel San Giovanni, Piacenza, Italy

Covini Engineering is an Italian car manufacturer that was formed in 1978 by Ferruccio Covini. The company is generally best known for the Covini C6W, a 6-wheeled sports car that has two axles (four wheels) in the front of the car. This company Is located in Castel San Giovanni, Piacenza.

Covini's first prototype, the Covini T44, was a 4x4 off-road vehicle with a body consisting entirely of flat, interchangeable panels. It was powered by a 2,000 cc turbocharged diesel motor. However, the T44 never saw actual production beyond the one prototype. Over the following 20 years, Covini developed several two-door sport cars with diesel engines: the T46, B24, T40, and C36. These all remained at the prototype stage, except for the B24, which Covini claims was produced, with about 9 being made.

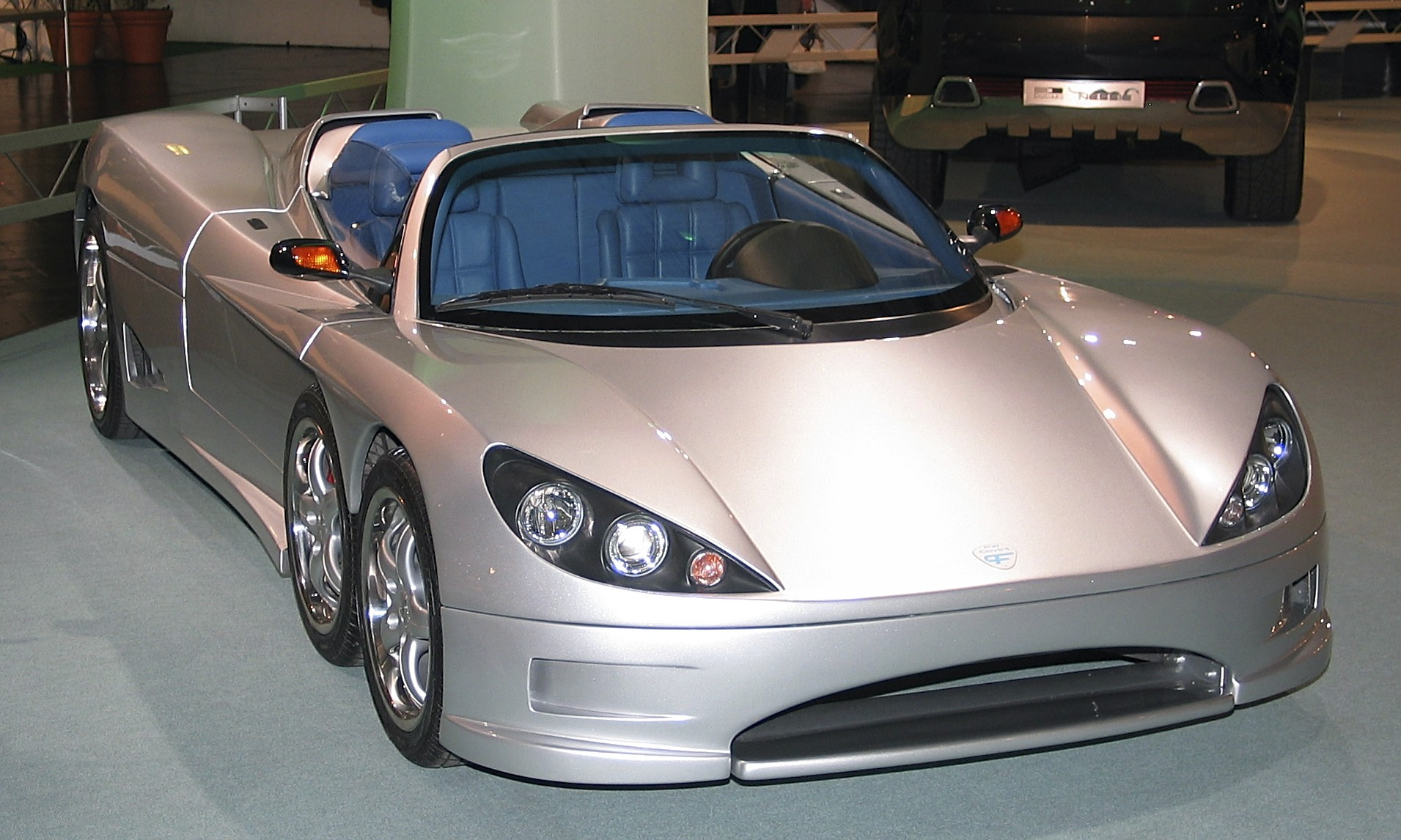
Covini C6W

In 2008, after several years of renderings and photographs, Covini officially announced the public release of the C6W. The peculiar 6-wheel format draws inspiration from the Tyrrell P34 Formula One car of the 1970s.

Apart from developing its own prototypes, the organization has also done consulting and design work on other projects. The firm contributed to the redesign of the Cadillac STS for the European market, as well as for the design of the Callaway C7. Outside of the automotive industry, Covini also worked on the Dragonfly Project, which was an attempt to build an ultralight helicopter.

== T44 ==
the Covini T44 Soleado was a 4x4 off-road vehicle with a body consisting entirely of flat, interchangeable panels. It was powered by a 2,000 cc turbocharged diesel motor producing 84 PS (83 hp; 62 kW), paired with a 5-speed manual transmission. The design, patents and prototype were reportedly bought in 1980 by VM Motori, to be produced by Alfa Romeo. Alfa Romeo went bankrupt two years later in 1982, and production of the T44 never materialized, beyond the one prototype, which was sold to an Italian body shop in 1994.

== T46 ==
The Covini T46 was reportedly built in 1979, and was powered by a 3,600 cc diesel engine. It later evolved into the T40 in the 1980s.

== B24 ==
Covini B24 Turbocooler
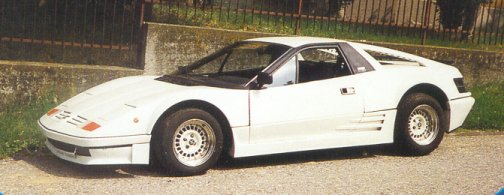

Overview
- Manufacturer: Covini Engineering
- Also called: Covini BT424; Covini Sirio
- Production: 1981 (9 produced)
- Designer: Ferruccio Covini

Body and chassis
- Body style: 2-door coupe
- Layout: RMR layout

Dimensions
- Curb weight: 1,050 kg (2,310 lb)

The Covini B24 Turbocooler or Sirio is an experimental car built by Covini Engineering and unveiled to the public in January, 1981, at the Geneva Motor Show. It is based on the earlier Lombardi FL1 prototype, introduced in 1972, which Covini bought and modified with a new powertrain and rear buttresses. It was built to test new technologies, such as the air-liquid intercooler. The B24 was powered by a 2.4 L (2,393 cc) VM Motori turbodiesel I4 engine that produces 95 kW (127.4 hp, 130 PS) at 4,300 rpm. Covini claims that the B24 was produced in limited quantities for the U.S. market, with about 9 being made (including a few BT424 models with Lancia Gamma petrol engines), but no confirmed pictures are known to exist of these cars. The B24 reportedly has a top speed of 205 km/h (127 mph), which Covini claim makes it the first road-legal diesel vehicle to exceed 200 km/h (124 mph).

== T40 ==
Covini T40
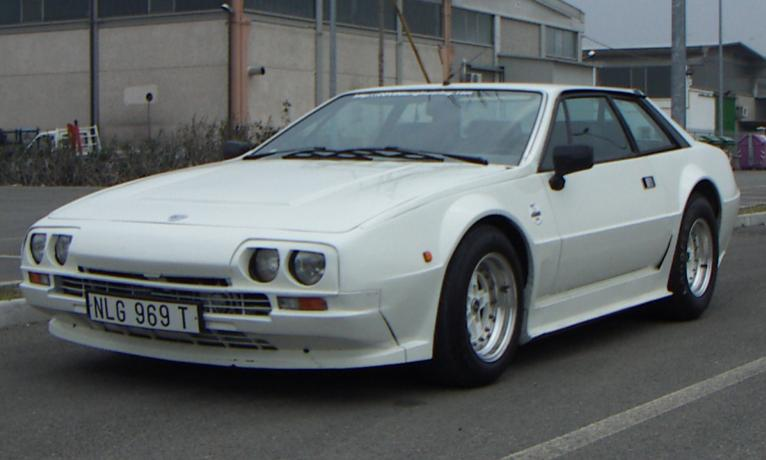

Overview
- Manufacturer: Covini Engineering
- Also called: Covini Summit
- Production: 1985
- Designer: Ferruccio Covini

Body and chassis
- Body style: 2-door coupe
- Layout: FR layout

Powertrain
- Engine: 3.5L turbo-diesel I5
- Transmission: 5-speed manual

The Covini T40 Overboost is a car designed by Ferruccio Covini and built by Covini Engineering in 1985. It is a 4-seater coupe. It was sometimes known by its nickname "Summit", because it is an evolution of the earlier Covini T46 prototype from 1979. The car is powered by a 3.5 L (3,500 cc) VM Motori 5-cylinder Turbo-diesel engine that produces 165 kW (221 hp, 224 PS) at 4,300 rpm. It can accelerate from 0-100 kmh (0-62 mph) in 7.5 seconds and has a top speed of 235 km/h (146 mph).

== C36 ==
Covini C36

Overview
- Manufacturer: Covini Engineering
- Production: 1998

Body and chassis
- Body style: 2-door coupe
- Layout: RMR layout

Powertrain
- Engine: 3.6L turbo-diesel I6
- Transmission: 6-speed manual

Dimensions
- Curb weight: 1,050 kg (2,310 lb)

The Covini C36 Turbotronic is a concept car produced by Covini Engineering and introduced in 1998 at the Turin Auto Show. The C36 is powered by a mid-mounted 3.6 L (3,600 cc) VM Motori turbo-diesel I6 engine that produces 170 kW (228 hp, 231 PS) at 4,200 rpm and 320 nm (236 ft lb) of torque at 2,850 rpm. It features a composite body made from a combination of fiberglass and carbon fiber, Brembo brakes and a 6-speed manual transmission. The C36 in its final prototype form reached a top speed of 300 km/h (186 mph) with its VM Motori diesel engine.

== See also ==
- Covini C6W
- Tyrrell P34
- VM Motori
