= VM Motori =

Italian diesel engine manufacturer

VM Motori S.p.A.
- Type: Subsidiary
- Industry: Automotive
- Founded: 1947; 79 years ago
- Headquarters: Cento, Italy
- Products: Diesel engines
- Number of employees: 350
- Parent: Stellantis (2011-2025); Marval Group (2025-present)
- Website: www.vmmotori.it

VM Motori S.p.A. is an Italian diesel engine manufacturer headquartered, along with its main production facilities, in Cento, Emilia-Romagna. Founded in 1947, it was a wholly-owned subsidiary of Stellantis from 2011 to 2025, when it was acquired by Marval Group.

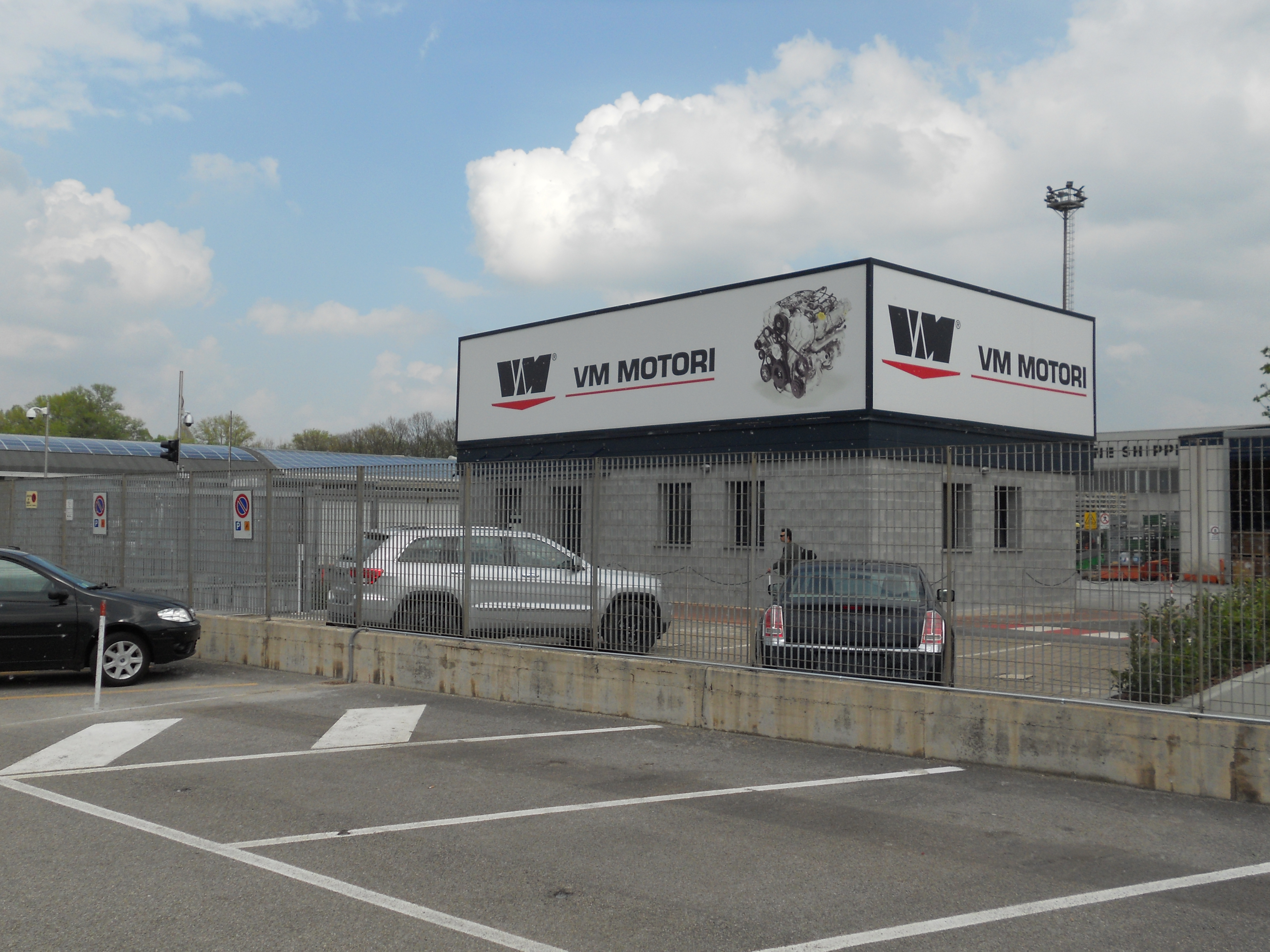
Entrance of VM

== History ==
VM Motori was founded in 1947 by two entrepreneurs, Claudio Vancini and Ugo Martelli (hence the initials "VM") in 1947.

In 1971, VM merged with Stabilimenti Meccanici Triestini, a Trieste-based industrial joint venture that included Finmeccanica (now Leonardo), who took a majority stake in the combined company. The company was referred to as "Finmeccanica VM" for many years.

As part of Finmeccanica's restructuring in 1989, its stake in VM Motori was sold to company management, backed by Midland Montagu, in a leveraged buyout. This left VM with only its Cento plant.

Detroit Diesel bought VM Motori in 1995. In 2000, Detroit was purchased by DaimlerChrysler.

In 2003, Penske Corporation purchased a 51% stake in VM Motori; in 2007, Penske bought the remaining 49% from Detroit Diesel and subsequently sold 50% of it to General Motors.

In September 2008, GAZ Group announced plans to purchase a 50% stake from Penske, but ultimately cancelled them in February 2009.

On 11 February 2011, Fiat Powertrain Technologies and Penske reached an agreement under which FPT would purchase Penske's 50% stake in VM Motori.

Fiat Group Automobiles (now Stellantis) acquired GM's remaining 50% stake of VM Motori on 28 October 2013.

In more recent years, VM Motori had shifted its focus to industrial and marine applications (its original fields of business), having stopped automobile engine development in 2022. This, combined with Stellantis' continued effort to focus on EVs, culminated on September 9, 2025, in Stellantis selling VM to Gamma Holdings, a company run by a group of Italian investors that control Marval Group, an Italian powertrain component manufacturer. The sale was completed on December 19.

== Products and licensing ==
In 1947, the company produced the first Italian air-cooled diesel engine with direct injection.

In 1964, the company introduced entire new families of air-cooled diesel engines for fishing boats and the industrial machine markets.

1974 saw the introduction of a new series of high-speed (4,200 rpm) HR-series, pre-combustion chamber, water-cooled, turbocharged engines.

The Alfa Romeo Alfetta, produced in Arese, rolled off the line with a VM Motori engine under the bonnet in 1979, signaling VM's move to the OEM automotive market. This was Italy's first turbodiesel engine. The engines still retained some maritime features, such as individual heads for each cylinder - a design which made it easier to produce different cylinder configurations.

During the 1980s, British Leyland chose VM engines as the smoothest, most petrol-like units available for diesel models of their Range Rover and Rover SD1; the choice continued with the later Rover 800.

The Covini B24, T40 and C36 models all used VM Motori turbodiesel engines ranging from 4 to 6 cylinders.

The after-cooled, electronic-combustion, "Turbotronic" engine was unveiled in 1990. It was supplied to Alfa Romeo, Chrysler, Ford, General Motors, and Rover.

In 1995, when OEM automotive sales accounted for 75% of income, a major deal with Chrysler saw agreements to supply engines for their Jeep Cherokee, Jeep Grand Cherokee and Voyager (2.5-litre) models. VM Motori's R 428 DOHC (a 2.8-litre common rail turbodiesel) was chosen for the Jeep Liberty CRD (Cherokee). From 2005, the R 428 was used in the Chrysler Grand Voyager and made its way into the Dodge Nitro.

In 1998, VM Motori introduced the R 420, a new 2.0-litre four-cylinder turbocharged unit, along with a 1.5-litre three-cylinder derivative, the R 315. Both engines featured a single overhead camshaft, four valves per cylinder, and common rail direct fuel injection. They were licensed to the South Korean manufacturer Hyundai. (Note: At that time VM Motori was owned by the Detroit Diesel Corporation, which in turn was owned by DaimlerChrysler, to whom Hyundai had an alliance with since 2000.) The 1.5-litre was used in the second generation Hyundai Accent, the Hyundai Getz and the Hyundai Matrix. These were produced and marketed between the fall of 2001 and the end of 2005. The 2.0-litre was used in many Hyundai and Kia models as the only diesel variant.

In 2004, GM Daewoo licensed the 1.5-litre and 2.0-litre common rail engine designs, and built a dedicated engine plant, which started production 2006. The 2.0 L diesel was used in the Daewoo Winstorm (also badged as the Chevrolet Captiva, and in the related Opel Antara), the Daewoo Lacetti (also badged as the Chevrolet Lacetti), the Daewoo Tosca (also badged as the Chevrolet Epica) and the Chevrolet Cruze.

In 2001, the 2.5-litre R 425 made its debut in the Chrysler Voyager. From 2012 to 2020, this engine, branded under the Duramax series (first as the XLD25 and later the LKH), was used in the Holden Colorado and the Thai-market Chevrolet Colorado. The TX4 London style taxicab also uses the R 425.

The company is also selling its products to off-highway applications, such as marine and defense. MTU Friedrichshafen holds the exclusive sales rights for VM Motori off-highway engines outside of Italy.

In June 2010, VM Motori started the production of the A 428, an updated successor to the R 428 for Euro 5 compliance, to power the 2011 Jeep Wrangler, 2011 Jeep Cherokee and 2012 Lancia Voyager. From 2013, it was also used in the Holden Colorado, followed by the Chevrolet Colorado in 2014 (once again branded as a Duramax).

In January 2011, VM Motori launched the A 630, a 3.0L V6 with Variable Valve Timing. By a collaboration with Fiat Powertrain Technologies, the engine featured FPT's Common Rail Multijet2 technology for improved performance, fuel economy and NVH. In 2013, the engine was redesigned to comply with Euro5+ emissions standards.

The first application of the A 630 DOHC was the 2011 Grand Cherokee. From 2014 to 2023, the same engine—rebranded as the EcoDiesel—was used in the Ram 1500, Jeep Grand Cherokee, Jeep Wrangler, and Jeep Gladiator, and (in lightly tuned form) the Maserati Ghibli III. The A 630 won several awards, making Ward's 10 Best Engines list in 2014, 2015 and 2016. Stellantis has sold upwards of 20 vehicles with the engine but an estimated 50,000 of them have failed. The engine has been a subject of several class action lawsuits.

== See also ==
- List of Italian companies
- List of VM Motori engines
