= PROCONVE =

Programa de Controle da Poluição do Ar por Veículos Automotores - PROCONVE (automobiles) and PROMOT (motorcycles) is a division of IBAMA that regulates vehicular emissions in Brazil.

The European emission standards (used in many Latin American countries) are taken as a reference.

Standards for light vehicles are indicated by the letter 'L'. For heavy vehicles, 'P' is used (pesados). A number indicates an increasingly stricter norm for each class. Currently Ln pairs up with Pn+1.

== Partial timeline ==
From 1 January 2012, all new heavy vehicles in Brazil must comply with Proconve P7 (similar to Euro 5)

From 1 January 2015, all new light vehicles in Brazil must comply with Proconve L6 (similar to Euro 5).

From 1 January 2022, all new light vehicles in Brazil must comply with Proconve L7 (similar to Euro 6).

From 1 January 2023, all new heavy vehicles in Brazil must comply with Proconve P8 (similar to Euro 6).

From 1 January 2025, the new light vehicle fleets in Brazil must comply with the first stage of Proconve L8 (automaker average).
