= Bangkok International Motor Show =

Motor show

The Bangkok International Motor Show is a motor show. It is also known as the "Thailand Motor Show" among automotive enthusiasts. The show takes place annually at the Challenger 1-3, Impact, Muang Thong Thani, Nonthaburi Province, a northern suburb of Bangkok, Thailand. The Bangkok Motor Show was the first motor show in Thailand, and it remains the largest in the country.

The Bangkok International Motor Show is organized by the Grand Prix International Co. Ltd. It was founded by Dr. Prachin Eamlumnow in 1979. The official co-sponsors of the show are the Royal Automobile Association of Thailand, the Ministry of Industry, the Ministry of Tourism and Sports, the Tourism Authority of Thailand, and the Thai Auto-Parts Manufacturers Association.

Despite having the similar title and takes place at the same location with the Thailand International Motor Expo, they are not related.

== Bangkok International Motor Show Accreditation by OICA ==
The International Organization of Motor Vehicle Manufacturers was founded in Paris in 1919. It is known as the "Organisation Internationale des Constructeurs d’Automobiles" (OICA). The OICA provides international accreditation to motor shows across the globe, including the Bangkok International Motor Show.

== History ==
=== First Motor Show in Thailand (2–6 April 1979) ===
The first motor show in Thailand took place from 2 April 1979, to 6 April 1979. It received 380 visitors during the first 5 days it was open to the public. The Motor Show became a big annual event on the Thailand Automotive Calendar, and a decade later, Prachin Eamlumnow (founder of the Bangkok Motor Show) was nicknamed the "King of the Motorshow."

=== Calendar of the Bangkok International Motor Show ===
Below is a list of all the Bangkok International Motor Show dates.

Motor Show	Year	Dates	Venue	Number of Visitors
1st Bangkok International Motor Show	1979	2 – 6 April 1979	Lumpini Park	380,000
2nd Bangkok International Motor Show	1980	12 – 16 November 1980	Suan Amporn	398,200
3rd Bangkok International Motor Show	1982	3 – 7 May 1982	Suan Amporn	405,000
4th Bangkok International Motor Show	1983	11 – 15 May 1983	Suan Amporn	409,275
5th Bangkok International Motor Show	1984	12 – 18 May 1984	Suan Amporn	410,510
6th Bangkok International Motor Show	1985	29 April – 5 May 1985	Suan Amporn	431,017
7th Bangkok International Motor Show	1986	29 April – 5 May 1986	Suan Amporn	445,714
8th Bangkok International Motor Show	1987	27 April – 3 May 1987	Suan Amporn	524,671
9th Bangkok International Motor Show	1988	26 April – 2 May 1988	Suan Amporn	649,587
10th Bangkok International Motor Show	1989	29 May – 4 June 1989	Suan Amporn	790,296
11th Bangkok International Motor Show	1990	25 April – 1 May 1990	Suan Amporn	1,105,000
12th Bangkok International Motor Show	1991	27 April – 5 May 1991	Suan Amporn	1,302,570
13th Bangkok International Motor Show	1992	24 April – 2 May 1992	Suan Amporn	1,690,736
14th Bangkok International Motor Show	1993	4 – 12 May 1993	Suan Amporn	1,753,438
15th Bangkok International Motor Show	1994	30 April – 8 May 1994	Suan Amporn	1,981,384
16th Bangkok International Motor Show	1995	29 April – 7 May 1995	Suan Amporn	1,781,018
17th Bangkok International Motor Show	1996	27 April – 5 May 1996	Suan Amporn	2,087,539
18th Bangkok International Motor Show	1997	26 April - 5 May 1997	Suan Amporn	1,904,521
19th Bangkok International Motor Show	1998	1 – 9 April 1998	BITEC Bangna	1,587,629
20th Bangkok International Motor Show	1999	27 April – 4 May 1999	BITEC Bangna	1,769,459
21st Bangkok International Motor Show	2000	1 – 9 April 2000	BITEC Bangna	1,650,750
22nd Bangkok International Motor Show	2001	31 March – 8 April 2001	BITEC Bangna	1,650,750
23rd Bangkok International Motor Show	2002	29 March – 7 April 2002	BITEC Bangna	1,730,500
24th Bangkok International Motor Show	2003	29 March – 7 April 2003	BITEC Bangna	1,600,000
25th Bangkok International Motor Show	2004	26 March – 4 April 2004	BITEC Bangna	1,660,000
26th Bangkok International Motor Show	2005	25 March – 3 April 2005	BITEC Bangna	1,693,200
27th Bangkok International Motor Show	2006	24 March – 2 April 2006	BITEC Bangna	1,659,500
28th Bangkok International Motor Show	2007	30 March – 8 April 2007	BITEC Bangna	1,595,600
29th Bangkok International Motor Show	2008	30 March – 8 April 2008	BITEC Bangna	1,675,939
30th Bangkok International Motor Show	2009	26 March – 6 April 2009	BITEC Bangna	1,600,000
31st Bangkok International Motor Show	2010	26 March – 6 April 2010	BITEC Bangna	1,800,000
32nd Bangkok International Motor Show	2011	25 March – 5 April 2011	Impact Muang Thong Thani	1,900,000
33rd Bangkok International Motor Show	2012	28 March – 8 April 2012	Impact Muang Thong Thani	1,959,588
34th Bangkok International Motor Show	2013	27 March – 7 April 2013	Impact Muang Thong Thani	1,756,121
35th Bangkok International Motor Show	2014	26 March – 6 April 2014	Impact Muang Thong Thani	1,779,904
36th Bangkok International Motor Show	2015	25 March – 5 April 2015	Impact Muang Thong Thani	1,730,000
37th Bangkok International Motor Show	2016	23 March – 3 April 2016	Impact Muang Thong Thani	1,650,000
38th Bangkok International Motor Show	2017	29 March – 9 April 2017	Impact Muang Thong Thani	1,600,000
39th Bangkok International Motor Show	2018	28 March – 8 April 2018	Impact Muang Thong Thani	1,620,000
40th Bangkok International Motor Show	2019	27 March – 7 April 2019	Impact Muang Thong Thani	1,600,000
41st Bangkok International Motor Show	2020	15 – 26 July 2020	Impact Muang Thong Thani	1,049,046
42nd Bangkok International Motor Show	2021	24 March – 4 April 2021	Impact Muang Thong Thani	1,340,000
43rd Bangkok International Motor Show	2022	23 March – 3 April 2022	Impact Muang Thong Thani	1,578,898
44th Bangkok International Motor Show	2023	22 March – 2 April 2023	Impact Muang Thong Thani	1,620,459
45th Bangkok International Motor Show	2024	27 March – 7 April 2024	Impact Muang Thong Thani	1,610,972
46th Bangkok International Motor Show	2025	26 March – 6 April 2025	Impact Muang Thong Thani	1,601,011
47th Bangkok International Motor Show	2026	25 March – 5 April 2026	Impact Muang Thong Thani	1,798,312
48th Bangkok International Motor Show	2027	24 March – 4 April 2027	Impact Muang Thong Thani	TBA
49th Bangkok International Motor Show	2028	TBA	Impact Muang Thong Thani	TBA
50th Bangkok International Motor Show	2029	TBA	Impact Muang Thong Thani	TBA
51st Bangkok International Motor Show	2030	TBA	Impact Muang Thong Thani	TBA
52nd Bangkok International Motor Show	2031	TBA	Impact Muang Thong Thani	TBA
