= Ford Ranger (Americas) =

American series of pickup trucks

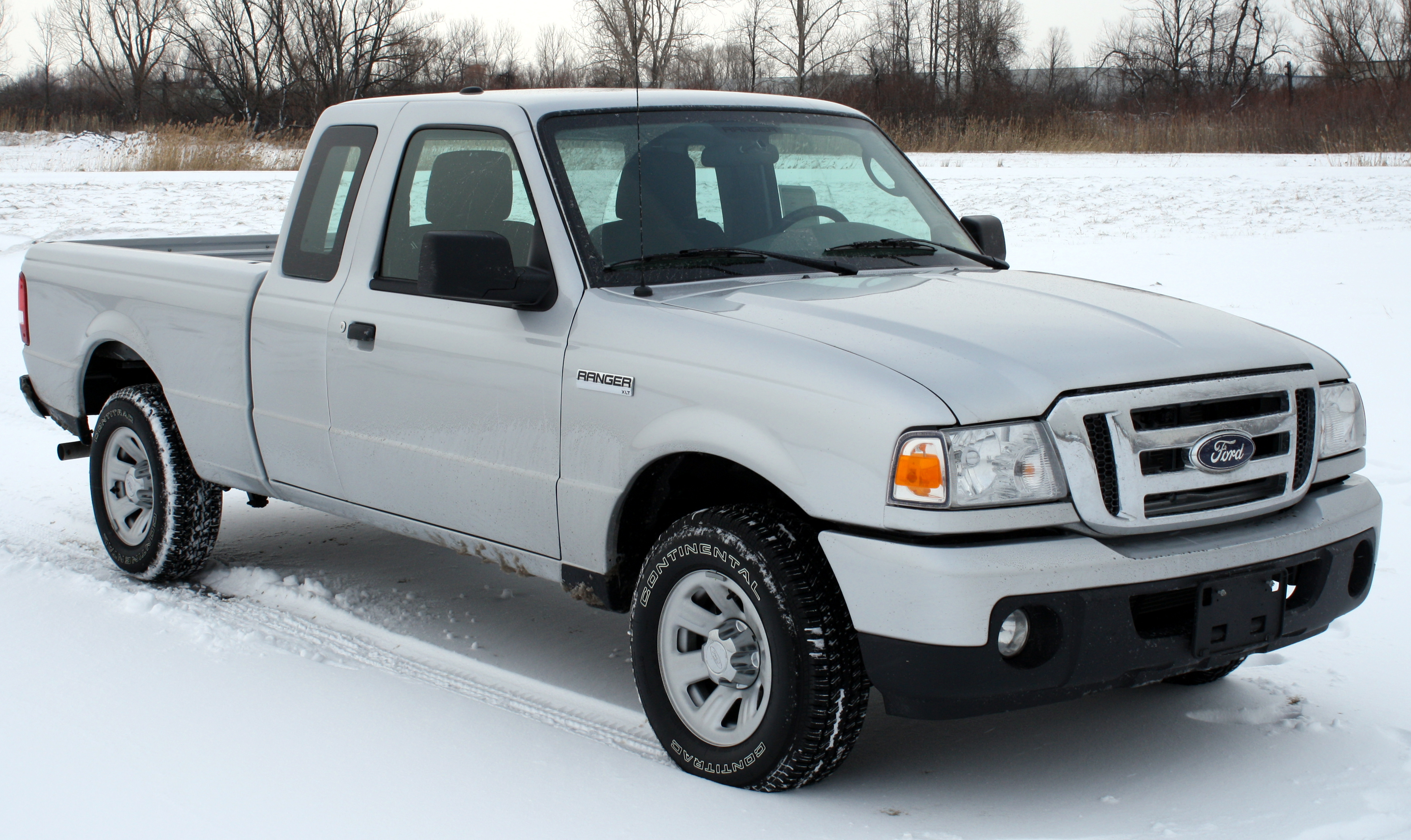
- 2011 Ford Ranger XLT

Overview
- Manufacturer: Ford Motor Company
- Production: 1982–2011; October 2018 – present
- Model years: 1983–2012; 2019–present

Body and chassis
- Class: Compact pickup truck (1983–2012); Mid-size pickup truck (2019–present)
- Layout: Front-engine, rear-wheel drive or four-wheel drive

Chronology
- Predecessor: Ford Courier

The Ford Ranger is a range of pickup trucks manufactured and marketed by Ford Motor Company in North and South America under the Ford Ranger nameplate. Introduced in early 1982 for the 1983 model year, the Ranger is currently in its fifth generation. Developed as a replacement for the Mazda-sourced Ford Courier, the model line has been sold across the Americas; Ford of Argentina began production of the Ranger for South America in 1998.

Through its production, the model line has served as a close rival to the Chevrolet S-10 and its Chevrolet Colorado successor (and their GMC counterparts), with the Ranger as the best-selling compact truck in the United States from 1987 to 2004. From 2012 to 2018, the Ranger model line was retired in North America as Ford concentrated on its full-size F-Series pickup trucks. For the 2019 model year, Ford introduced a fourth generation of the Ranger (after a seven-year hiatus). The first mid-size Ranger in North America, the model line is derived from the globally marketed Ford Ranger (revised to fulfill North American design requirements).

The first three generations of the Ranger were produced by Ford at its Louisville Assembly (Louisville, Kentucky), Edison Assembly (Edison, New Jersey), and Twin Cities Assembly (Saint Paul, Minnesota) facilities; the final 2012 Ranger was the final vehicle produced at the St. Paul facility. The current fourth-generation Ranger is manufactured by Ford at Wayne Stamping & Assembly (Wayne, Michigan). Ford of Argentina produced the Ranger in its General Pacheco plant from 1998 to 2011; it replaced the North American–designed version of the Ranger with the current Ranger T6 for 2012 production.

== Development ==
=== Ford Courier (1972–1982) ===
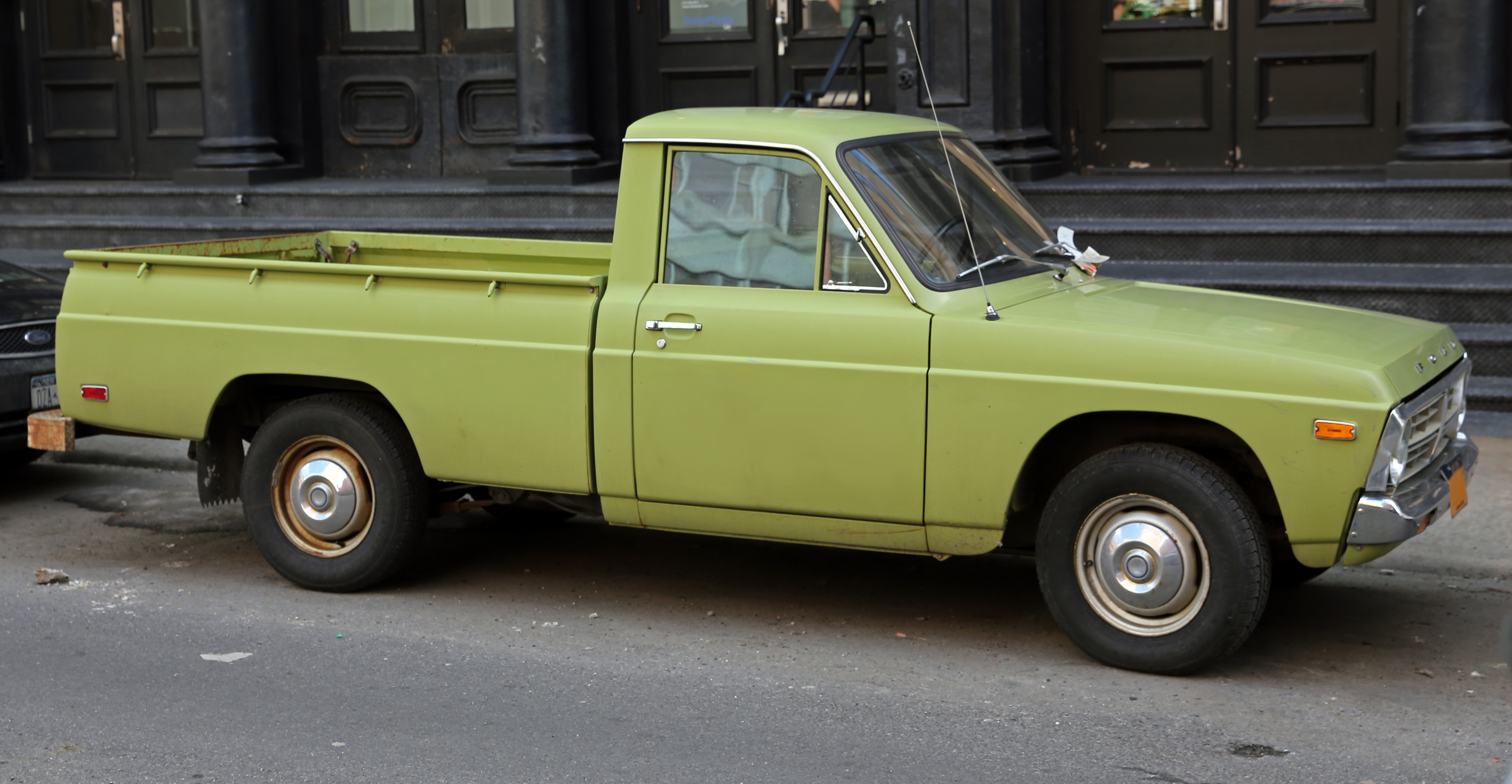
1975 Ford Courier

For the 1972 model year, the Ford Courier was introduced as the first compact pickup truck sold by Ford. Following the rise of the compact truck segment during the 1960s, Ford entered into a partnership with Mazda to market the Mazda B1800 in North America; the Courier would become the first of several jointly manufactured vehicles between the two companies from the 1970s into the 2000s. Along with minimizing the risk for Ford of developing a vehicle in an unfamiliar market segment, the partnership provided Mazda with critically needed funds.

While sharing the cab and chassis with its Mazda counterpart, to increase its sales potential in North America, the Courier adapted design elements of the Ford F-Series, with twin round headlamps, silver grille, and "FORD" lettering on the hood above the grille. In 1977, the Courier and B1800 (later B2000) were redesigned with a larger cab, redesigned pickup bed, and tailgate. While closer in appearance to its Mazda counterpart, the Courier was given signal/parking lamps inset in the grille (rather than the bumper); an optional 2.3L Ford engine was not available in the Mazda pickups.

From 1972 to 1982, the Ford Courier was manufactured alongside the Mazda B-Series in Hiroshima, Japan. To avoid the 25% Chicken Tax on imported trucks, both vehicles were imported as chassis-cab trucks (taxed at 4% tariff). Following their importation to United States, pickup truck beds shipped separately from Japan were installed before shipment to dealers.

=== Project Yuma (1976–1982) ===
In 1976, Ford commenced development on "Project Yuma" as a replacement for the Courier. In addition to designing the first domestically produced compact truck, another key factor driving the $700 million project was compliance with the fuel economy standards of the mid-1980s. At the launch of the project in 1976, Ford predicted that for the company to properly comply with 1985 CAFE standards, nearly 50% of pickup trucks sold in the United States would require a four-cylinder engine. In 1976, compact trucks held a 5% share of pickup truck sales, with Ford predicting an expansion to 50% by 1985, equaling nearly a million sales per year.

Project Yuma was centered around quality and fuel efficiency. At the beginning of the project, Ford researched additional elements that were valued by potential compact truck buyers. Along with flexibility for both work and personal use, Ford found that buyers desired additional interior room, including three-across seating, comfortable seats, and headroom and legroom for a six-foot-tall driver; other minor details were discovered such as five-bolt wheels and a larger ashtray.

During design, the body underwent extensive wind tunnel testing, to meet a planned 20 MPG fuel efficiency target (on its own, the standard front bumper spoiler added 1 MPG); its 0.45 drag coefficient bested that of the two-door Ford Mustang. To further improve fuel economy, the Ranger increased the use of high-strength steel and other lightweight materials, including a magnesium clutch housing, aluminum transfer case (for four-wheel drive), and a magnesium clutch/brake pedal bracket. To further save weight, the design of the front suspension was computer-optimized, rendering the front stabilizer bar optional. Though narrower than the F-Series and other full-size competitors, the cargo bed of the Ranger was given the capability to transport a four-foot-wide sheet of material (considered an industry measure of space in pickup truck bed design) through the use of recesses to insert supports across the bed, allowing such material to be placed above the wheel wells.

The 1979 fuel crisis nearly doomed the Yuma/Ranger project, as it occurred between launch of the 1979 Ford LTD and 1980 Ford F-Series. After selling nearly one million F-Series trucks in 1978, in 1980, Ford had yet to gain a profit from its redesign of the F-Series. Ford President Don Petersen kept the compact truck project alive for several reasons. By 1980, General Motors was developing its own domestically produced compact truck, with the Chevrolet S-10/GMC S-15 providing a potential competitor. Petersen also felt that, if equipped correctly, buyers would pay nearly the same for a compact truck as a full-size truck (such as the F-100).

Around 1980, the Project Yuma truck took on the Ford Ranger name, adopting the name of the mid to upper-level trim used by the Ford F-Series since 1965. In anticipation of the compact truck line, 1981 marked the final use of the Ranger trim for the F-Series and Bronco (replaced by XLS for 1982).

== Production ==
The Ranger was produced at the Louisville Assembly Plant in Louisville, Kentucky, from 1982 to 1999. From 1993 to 2004, production also was sourced from Edison Assembly in Edison, New Jersey. For its entire production run until 2011, the Ranger was produced at the Twin Cities Assembly Plant in St Paul, Minnesota. The final 2012 Ranger produced on December 16, 2011, ended 86 years of production at Twin Cities Assembly as well as the production of all compact pickups in the United States.

In 2008, Ford made its first plans to end production of the Ranger in North America, although its high productivity spared it from The Way Forward. Twin Cities Assembly (built in 1925) was the oldest Ford factory in the world. Ford later extended the closure date of the factory to 2011, but in June 2011, a final closure date was announced. As Twin Cities was the sole production location of the Ranger in North America (from 1982), its closure brought the production of the Ranger to an end after 29 model years. The 2011 model year was the final model year for retail sales, with a shortened 2012 model year for fleet sales; the final North American market Ranger (a white SuperCab Sport produced for pest-control company Orkin) was produced just before 10 a.m. local time on December 16, 2011.

Over its production life, the chassis and suspension of the Ranger would be used for several compact Ford trucks and sport-utility vehicles. During the 1990s and 2000s, Mazda adopted a badge-engineered version of the Ranger, for their B-Series nameplate (the reverse of the Ford Courier produced by Mazda).

In 2015, as part of contract negotiations with the United Auto Workers, leaked reports over the future of the Michigan Assembly Plant included the potential decision of replacing Ford Focus and Ford C-Max production with an American-market version of the global Ranger. Along with the revival of the Ranger nameplate, the UAW negotiations also included a potential revival of the Ford Bronco SUV. At the 2017 North American International Auto Show, Ford confirmed the return of the Ranger and Ford Bronco, with the Ford Ranger as a 2019 model-year vehicle.

== First generation (1983) ==
First generation
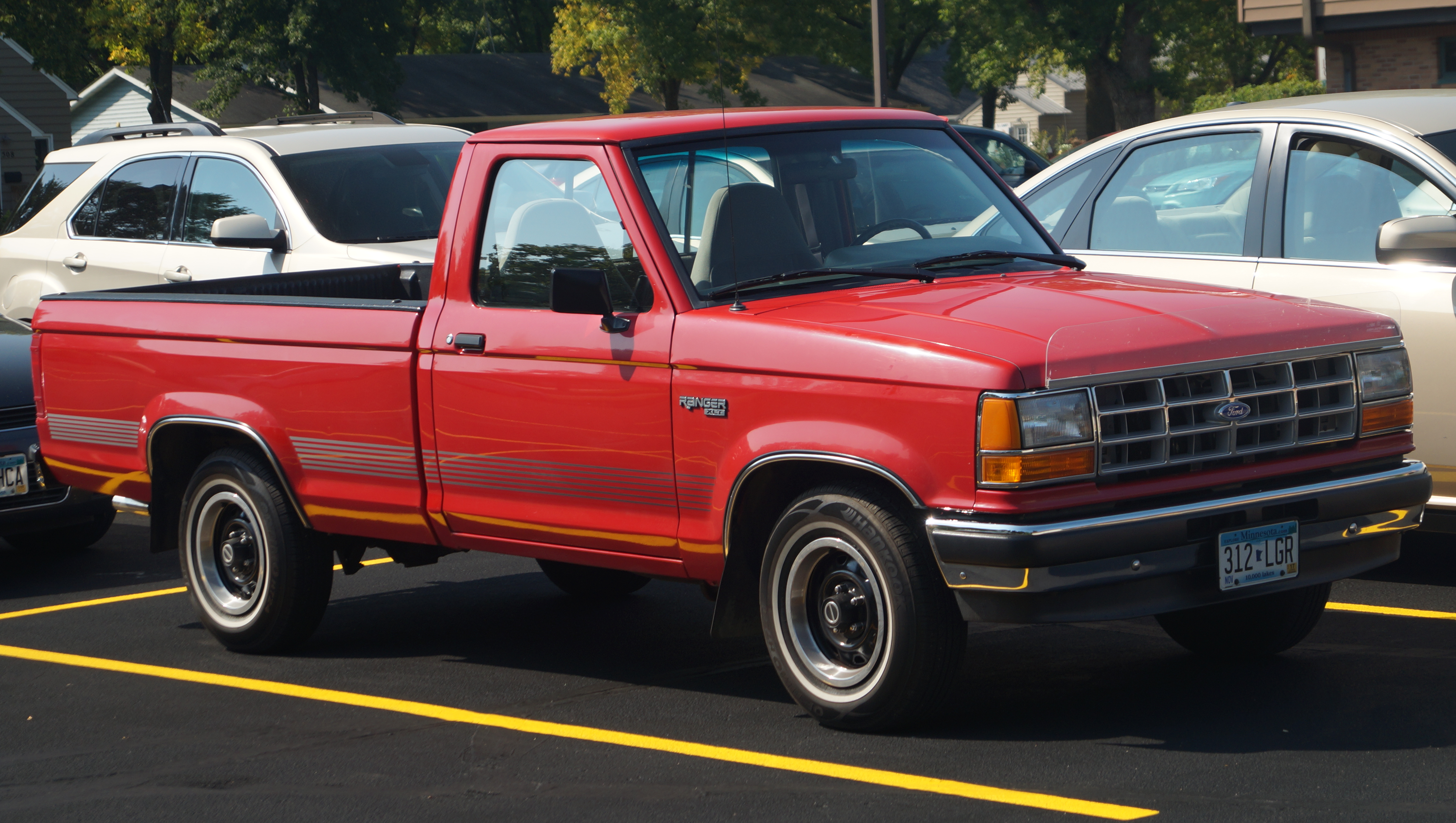
- 1989–1992 Ford Ranger XLT (facelift)

Overview
- Production: January 1982 – 1992
- Model years: 1983–1992
- Assembly: United States: Louisville, Kentucky; United States: St Paul, Minnesota

Body and chassis
- Body style: 2-door regular cab 2-door extended cab
- Related: Ford Bronco II; Ford Explorer (first generation)

Powertrain
- Engine: Inline-four engines: 1983–1988: 2.0 L Lima I4; 1983–1992: 2.3 L Lima LL23 I4; V6 engines: 1983–1986: 2.8 L Cologne V6; 1986–1990: 2.9 L Cologne V6; 1990–1992: 3.0 L Vulcan V6; 1990–1992: 4.0 L Cologne V6; Diesel engines: 1983–1984: 2.2 L Perkins 4.135 I4 (diesel); 1985–1987: 2.3 L Mitsubishi 4D55 I4 (turbo diesel)
- Transmission: Manual transmissions: 4-speed Toyo Kogyo TK4; 5-speed Toyo Kogyo TK5; 5-speed Mitsubishi FM132; 5-speed Mitsubishi FM145; 5-speed Mitsubishi FM146; 5-speed Mazda M5OD-R1; Automatic transmissions: 3-speed C3; 3-speed C5; 4-speed A4LD

Dimensions
- Wheelbase: Standard bed 107.9 in (2,741 mm); Long bed 113.9 in (2,893 mm); SuperCab; 125 in (3,175.0 mm)
- Length: Standard bed 1983–1988:175.6 in (4,460 mm); 1989–1992:176.5 in (4,483 mm); Long bed 1983–1988:187.6 in (4,765 mm); 1989–1992:188.5 in (4,788 mm); SuperCab; 1983–1988:192.7 in (4,895 mm); 1989–1992:193.6 in (4,917 mm)
- Width: 1983–1988: 66.9 in (1,699 mm); 1989–1992: 66.8 in (1,697 mm)
- Height: 64 in (1,626 mm) (4×2); 66.7 in (1,694 mm) (4×4)

The first Ranger rolled off the Louisville assembly line on January 18, 1982. While initially slated for a traditional autumn release, to more closely compete with the introduction of the Chevrolet S-10, Ford advanced the launch of the 1983 Ranger several months, with the first vehicles reaching showrooms in March 1982.

Initially sold alongside its Courier predecessor, the first 1983 Ranger was priced at US$6,203 (equivalent to $20,694 in 2025). While far smaller in exterior size than the F-Series, 4×4 Rangers offered a payload of 1,600 pounds, matching or exceeding the F-100 in payload capacity. For 1984, the Ford Bronco II two-door SUV was introduced. Similar in size to the 1966–1977 Bronco, the Bronco II used a shortened version of the Ranger chassis, along with much of its interior components.

For the 1989 model year, the Ranger underwent a major mid-cycle revision to improve its exterior aerodynamics and interior ergonomics. For 1991, the Ford Explorer SUV was derived from the facelifted Ranger, sharing its front fascia, chassis, and interior components.

=== Chassis specification ===
The first-generation Ranger uses a body-on-frame chassis design; while using a chassis developed specifically for the model line, the Ranger adopts many chassis design elements from the F-Series. Along with traditional leaf-spring rear suspension, the Ranger is fitted with Twin I-Beam independent front suspension. To minimize unsprung weight, the Twin I-Beams were constructed of stamped high-strength steel (rather than forged steel).

Rear-wheel drive was standard, with part-time four-wheel drive as an option (never offered in the Courier). Dependent on configuration, the Ranger was produced in three wheelbases: 107.9 inches (6-foot bed), 113.9 inches (7-foot bed), and 125 inches (SuperCab, introduced in 1986).

For 1989, rear-wheel anti-lock brakes became standard.

==== Powertrain ====
From 1983 to 1992, the first-generation Ranger was powered by 2.0L and 2.3L versions of the Ford "Lima" inline-4; the 2.8L, 2.9L, and 4.0L Ford Cologne V6; the 3.0L Ford Vulcan V6; and four-cylinder diesel engines sourced from Mazda (Perkins) and Mitsubishi. Two long-running engines associated with the Ford light trucks made their debut in the first-generation Ranger; the twin spark-plug version (with distributorless ignition) of the Pinto engine was introduced in 1989, remaining in use through 2001. In 1990, the 4.0L Cologne V6 was introduced; in modified form, the engine was used through the 2012 model-year discontinuation of the Ranger in North America.

A four-speed manual transmission was standard on all engines for 1983 and 1984, with a five-speed manual as an option; a three-speed automatic was offered on 2.3L and 2.8L engines. For 1985, the five-speed manual became the standard transmission, with a four-speed automatic offered on non-diesel Rangers. For 1989, the Mazda M5OD-R1 transmission became the standard transmission.

1983–1992 Ford Ranger engine specifications
Engine	Configuration	Production	Output
Ford Pinto LL20 I4	121 cu in (2.0 L) SOHC I4	1983–1988	73 hp
Ford Pinto LL23 I4	140 cu in (2.3 L) SOHC I4	1983–1984 (1-bbl) 1985–1992 (EFI)	1983–1984: 80 hp 1984–1988: 90 hp 1989–1992: 100 hp
Ford Cologne V6	170 cu in (2.8 L) OHV V6 177 cu in (2.9 L) OHV V6 244 cu in (4.0 L) OHV V6	1983–1985 (2.8L) 1986–1992 (2.9L) 1990–1992 (4.0L)	2.8L: 115 hp 2.9L: 140 hp (1986–1990); 145 hp (1991–1992); 4.0L: 160 hp
Ford Vulcan V6	182 cu in (3.0 L) OHV V6	1991–1992 (RWD only)	140 hp
Mazda S2 I4 diesel (Perkins 4.135)	135 cu in (2.2 L) OHV I4 naturally aspirated, IDI	1983–1984	59 hp
Mitsubishi 4D55 I4 diesel	143 cu in (2.3 L) SOHC I4 turbocharged, IDI	1985–1986	86 hp

=== Body design ===
Slightly larger than the Courier, the first-generation Ranger was approximately 18 inches shorter and 11 inches narrower than an equivalently configured F-100/F-150. While proportioned similar to the Chevrolet S-10 and Japanese-sourced compact trucks, it adopted exterior design elements from the F-Series, including its twin headlamps, chrome grille, "FORD" tailgate lettering, tail-lamps, and cab proportions. In line with the Courier, the Ranger was offered with two pickup bed sizes; a standard 6-foot length and an extended 7-foot length. In 1986, a third configuration was introduced with the advent of the Ranger SuperCab. Extended 17 inches behind the front doors for additional cab space, the SuperCab was offered with the 6-foot bed length; four-wheel-drive SuperCabs were sold only with V6 engines.

During its production, the first-generation Ranger was offered with several seating configurations. A three-passenger bench seat was standard, with various types of bucket seats offered (dependent on trim level). As part of the 1989 mid-cycle update, a 40/60 split-bench seat was introduced. The SuperCab was offered with a pair of center-facing jump seats, expanding capacity to five.

From 1983 to 1988, the interior saw few major revisions. In 1986, the instrument cluster was revised, allowing the fitment of a tachometer. To streamline production, the Ranger shared interior components with other Ford vehicles, sharing the steering column, door handles, and window controls from the Ford Escort, Ford F-Series, and Ford Bronco; nearly the entire driver's compartment of the Ford Bronco II was directly sourced from the Ranger.

For 1989, the Ranger underwent a mid-cycle redesign with new front fenders, a restyled hood and grille, and flush-mounted composite headlamps (with larger marker lamps). To further improve aerodynamics, the front bumper was redesigned and enlarged to fit more closely with the front fenders. Badging was revised; the fender icons were restyled, and the "FORD" lettering on the right-hand side of the XLT-significant tailgate trim panel was switched for a blue oval. The interior was given a redesign, including new door panels, new seats, and an all-new dashboard (introducing a glovebox). To improve ergonomics, the instrument panel was redesigned for improved legibility, with automatic transmission Rangers receiving a column-mounted gearshift; manual-transmission versions saw the removal of the key-release button from the steering column.

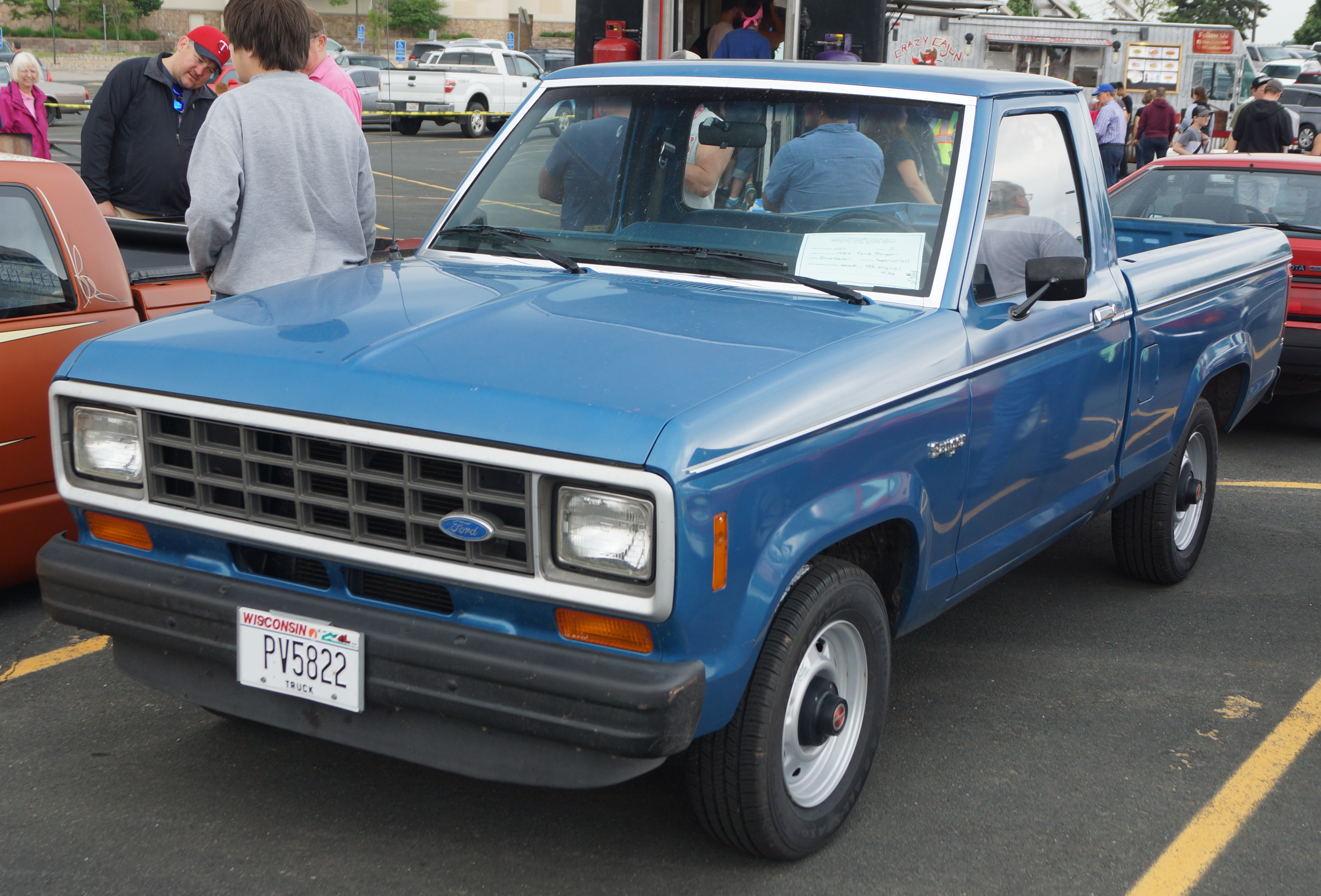
1984 Ford Ranger

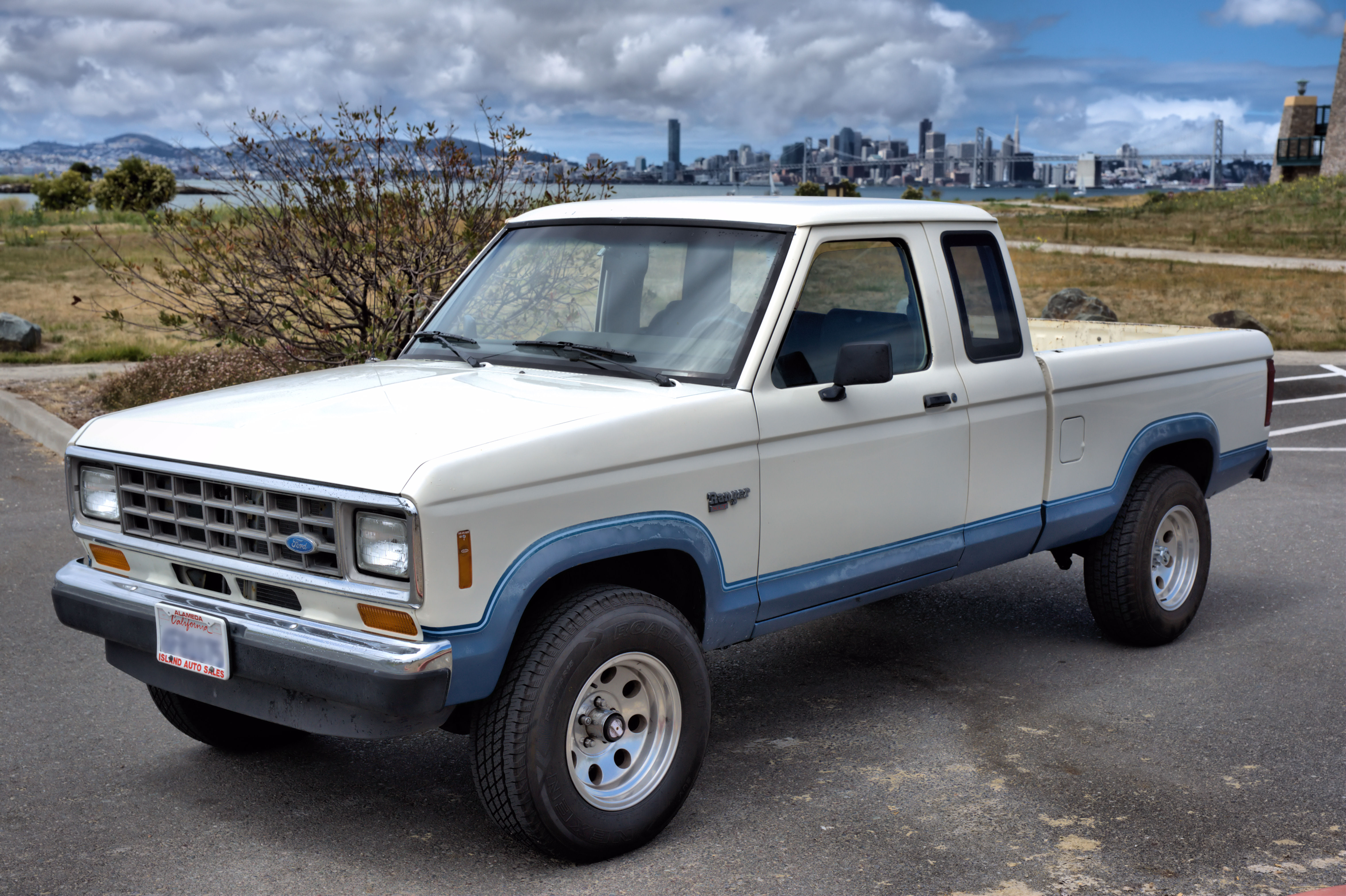
1988 Ford Ranger XLT SuperCab 4×4

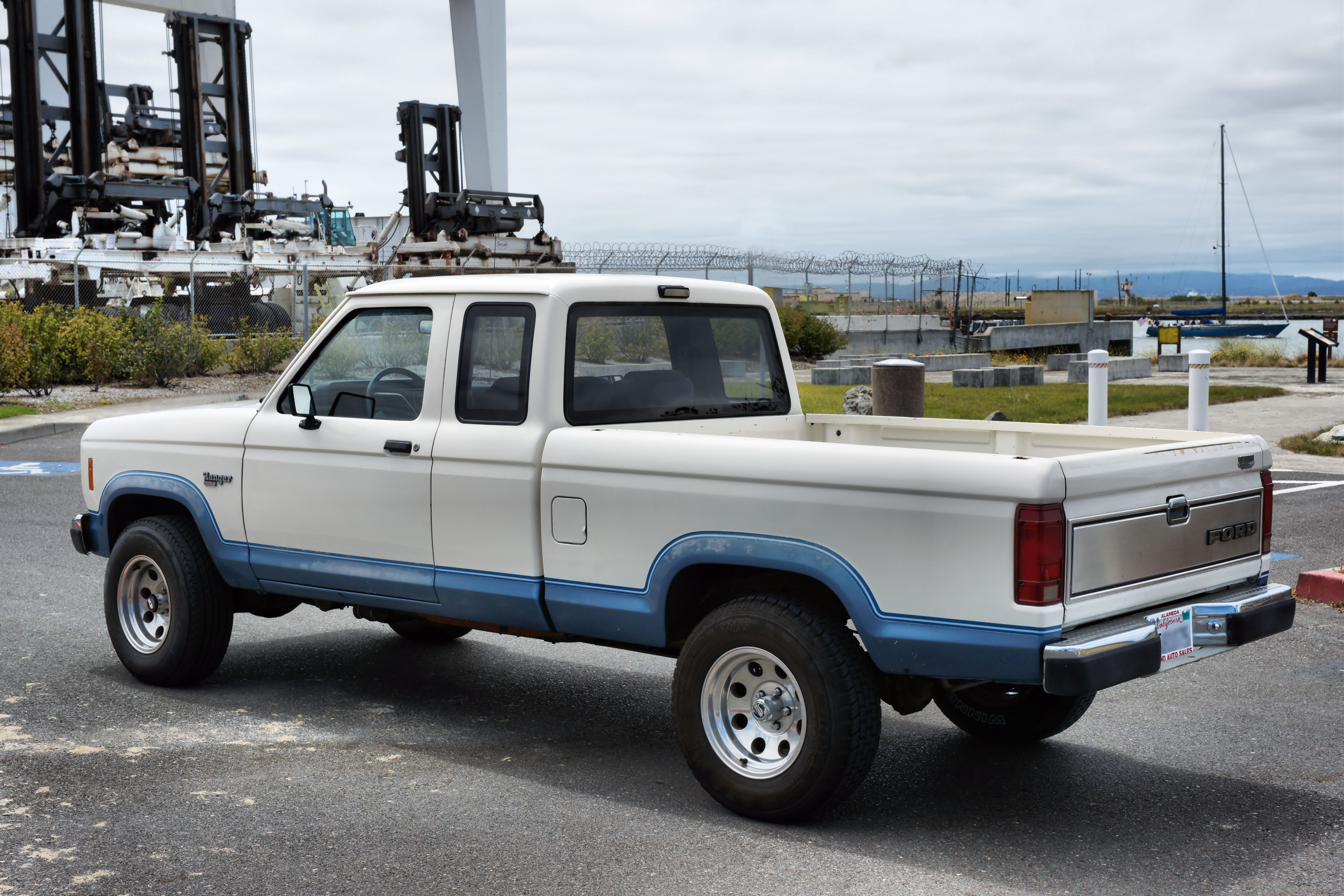
1988 Ford Ranger XLT SuperCab 4×4, rear

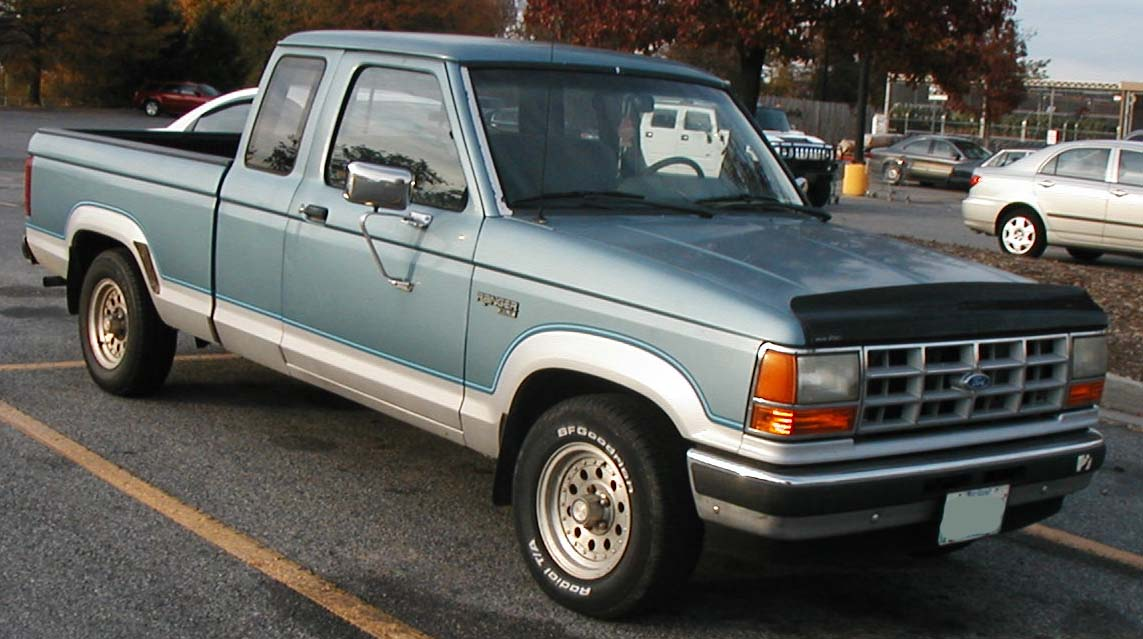
Facelift Ford Ranger XLT SuperCab

=== Trim ===
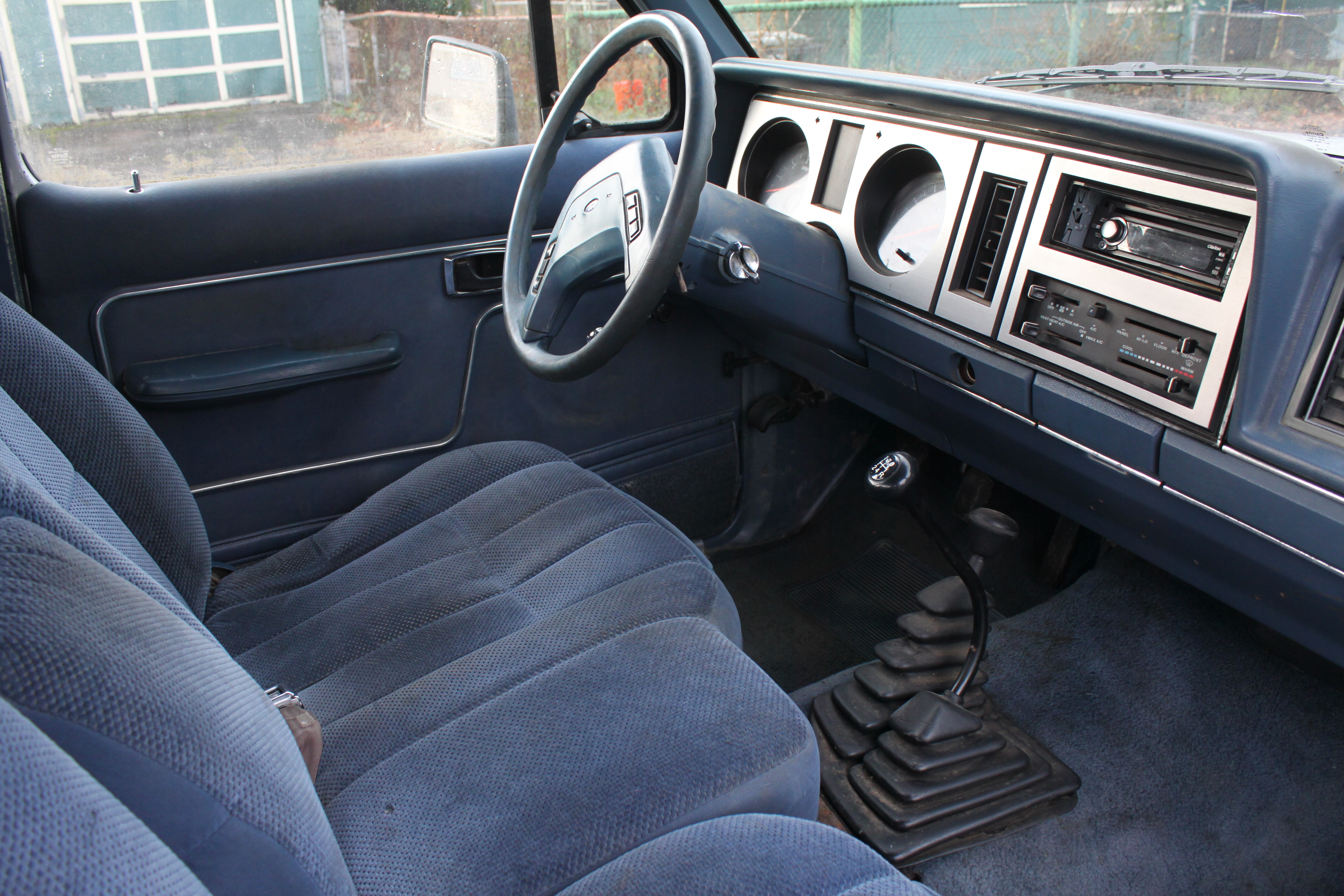
1987 Ford Ranger XLT SuperCab 4x4 interior

The first-generation Ranger was marketed in five trim levels: S, Ranger, XL, XLS, and XLT. Intended largely for fleet sales, the Ranger S (introduced in 1984) was offered with virtually no available options. While still largely a work truck, the Ranger XL offered color-keyed trim, floor mats, and chrome bumpers. The XLS was marketed as the sportiest version of the Ranger, offering bucket seats, blackout trim, and tape stripe packages (essentially the successor to the 1970s "Free Wheeling" trims) while the XLT was offered with two-tone exteriors, chrome exterior trim, and upgraded interior trim.

The Ranger STX was introduced in 1985 for Ranger 4x4s on the West Coast of the United States, becoming fully available for 1986. Offering a "sport" suspension and larger tires, the STX was denoted by the offering of a bucket-seat interior and model-specific two-tone paint scheme.

- S – Included: Vinyl upholstery, tachometer (only on 4×4 models), halogen headlamps, black foldaway mirrors, and manual transmission.
- Sport – Added: power steering, tachometer on 4×2 and 4×4 models, rear step bumper, an AM stereo with digital clock or an AM/FM stereo with cassette player and clock, and aluminum rims.
- Custom – same as S.
- XLT – Added: cloth upholstery, sliding rear window, chrome rear step bumper, brushed-aluminum tailgate appliqué, and deluxe wheel trim.
- STX – Added: tachometer on 4×2, floor console, fog lamps, an AM/FM stereo with clock, and sport cast aluminum rims.

==== Ranger GT ====
Following an initial late-1986 introduction in California, Ford marketed the Ranger GT "sport pickup" option package from 1987 to 1989. Offered only with regular-cab trucks equipped with two-wheel drive, the GT initially was offered for short-bed Rangers and introduced for long-bed vehicles during the model year. The Ranger GT was available in either red, white, or blue paint colors; chrome trim was painted body color. Equipped similar to a Ranger XLT, the interior of the GT featured two bucket seats and a center console. For 1988, a ground effects package was added, including a redesigned body-color front bumper (integrating the fog lamps).

Powered by a 140 hp 2.9L V6 (paired with either a 5-speed manual or 4-speed automatic transmission), the Ranger GT was equipped with front and rear anti-roll bars, a limited-slip differential, and performance tires. In 1989, the Ford Truck Public Affairs office constructed a one-off prototype, fitting a Ranger GT with a 220 hp V6 from the Ford Taurus SHO and a 5-speed manual transmission from a Mustang GT.

After the decision not to series-produce the variant with the SHO V6, the Ranger GT was shelved for 1990.

== Second generation (1993) ==
Second generation
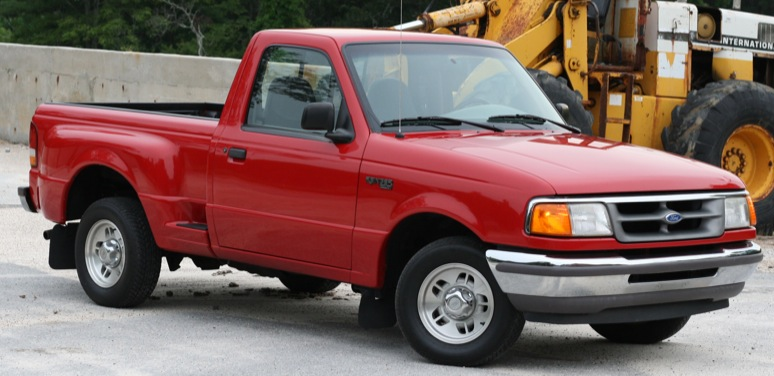

Overview
- Also called: Mazda B Series
- Production: August 1992 – July 1997
- Model years: 1993–1997
- Assembly: United States: Louisville, Kentucky; United States: St. Paul, Minnesota; United States: Edison, New Jersey; Argentina: General Pacheco

Body and chassis
- Body style: 2-door regular cab pickup 2-door extended cab pickup

Powertrain
- Engine: 2.3 L OHC I4; 3.0 L Vulcan V6; 4.0 L Cologne V6
- Transmission: Manual; 5-speed Mazda M5OD-R1; Automatic; 4-speed A4LD; 4-speed 4R44E; 4-speed 4R55E; 5-speed 5R55E

Dimensions
- Wheelbase: 107.9 in (2,741 mm); 113.9 in (2,893 mm); 125.2 in (3,180 mm)
- Length: 184.3 in (4,681 mm); 196.3 in (4,986 mm); 198.2 in (5,034 mm)
- Width: 69.4 in (1,763 mm)

After a ten-year production run, Ford introduced the second generation of the Ranger for the 1993 model year with much of its chassis carried over from the previous generation. Sharing no body panels with its predecessor, the redesigned Ranger shifted from a smaller-proportioned F-Series to a more aerodynamic design, no longer sharing its front fascia with the Ford Explorer. For the first time in the compact segment, the Ranger offered a stepside-style bed with the Ranger Splash.

For the 1994 model year, Ford commenced production of the Ranger for Mazda, who began to sell the model line as the B-Series pickup truck (effectively in reverse of the 1972–1982 agreement that produced the Ford Courier).

For 1995, the second-generation Ranger underwent a mid-cycle revision; in 1996, the model line became the first compact pickup to offer dual airbags.

=== Chassis specification ===
The second-generation Ranger carried much of its chassis design from its predecessor, with a leaf-sprung rear suspension and a Twin-I-Beam independent front suspension. Two wheelbases were carried over from the previous generation: 107.9 inches (short bed), 113.9 inches (long bed), with the SuperCab lengthened to 125.2 inches (0.2 inches longer).

Rear-wheel drive remained standard, with four-wheel drive as an option; a Dana 35 TTB front axle was used. With four-wheel drive Rangers, a manually shifted transfer case was standard; a "Touch Drive" electronically shifted transfer case was an option, using automatic-locking front-wheel hubs.

For 1995, the front brakes were revised, adopting two-piston brake calipers from the Ford Explorer; four-wheel anti-lock brakes were standardized on Rangers with 4-wheel drive and/or the 4.0L V6.

==== Powertrain ====
The standard engine on the second-generation Ranger was again the 2.3L inline-4 (retuned to 98 hp). The 2.9L V6 was retired, with the Ranger sharing two optional V6 engines with the Aerostar. The 140 hp 3.0L V6 became standard on STX trim and SuperCab 4x4s (retuned to 145 hp in 1995). The 160 hp 4.0L V6 (also shared with the Explorer) remained an option.

The Mazda M5OD 5-speed manual remained the standard transmission for all three engines. In 1995, the A4LD 4-speed automatic was replaced by two electronically controlled transmissions: the lighter-duty 4R44E (for the inline-4 and 3.0L V6) and the heavier-duty 4R55E (for the 4.0L V6). In 1997, the latter was replaced by the 5-speed 5R55E automatic, marking the first 5-speed automatic of an American manufacturer.

1992–1997 Ford Ranger powertrain details
Engine	Configuration	Production	Maximum output	Transmission
Ford Pinto LL23 I4	140 cu in (2.3 L) SOHC I4	1993-1997	1993–1994: 98 hp (73 kW) 133 lb⋅ft (180 N⋅m) 1995–1997: 112 hp (84 kW) 135 lb⋅ft (183 N⋅m)	Mazda 5-speed M5OD-R1 manual Ford A4LD 4-speed automatic Ford 4R44E 4-speed automatic
Ford Vulcan V6	182 cu in (3.0 L) OHV V6	1993-1997	1993–1994: 140 hp (104 kW) 160 lb⋅ft (217 N⋅m) 1995–1997: 145 hp (108 kW) 165 lb⋅ft (224 N⋅m)	Mazda 5-speed M5OD-R1 manual Ford A4LD 4-speed automatic Ford 4R44E 4-speed automatic
Ford Cologne V6	244 cu in (4.0 L) OHV V6	1993-1997	160 hp (119 kW) 225 lb⋅ft (305 N⋅m)	Mazda 5-speed M5OD-R1 manual Ford A4LD 4-speed automatic Ford 4R55E 4-speed automatic Ford 5R55E 5-speed automatic

=== Body design ===
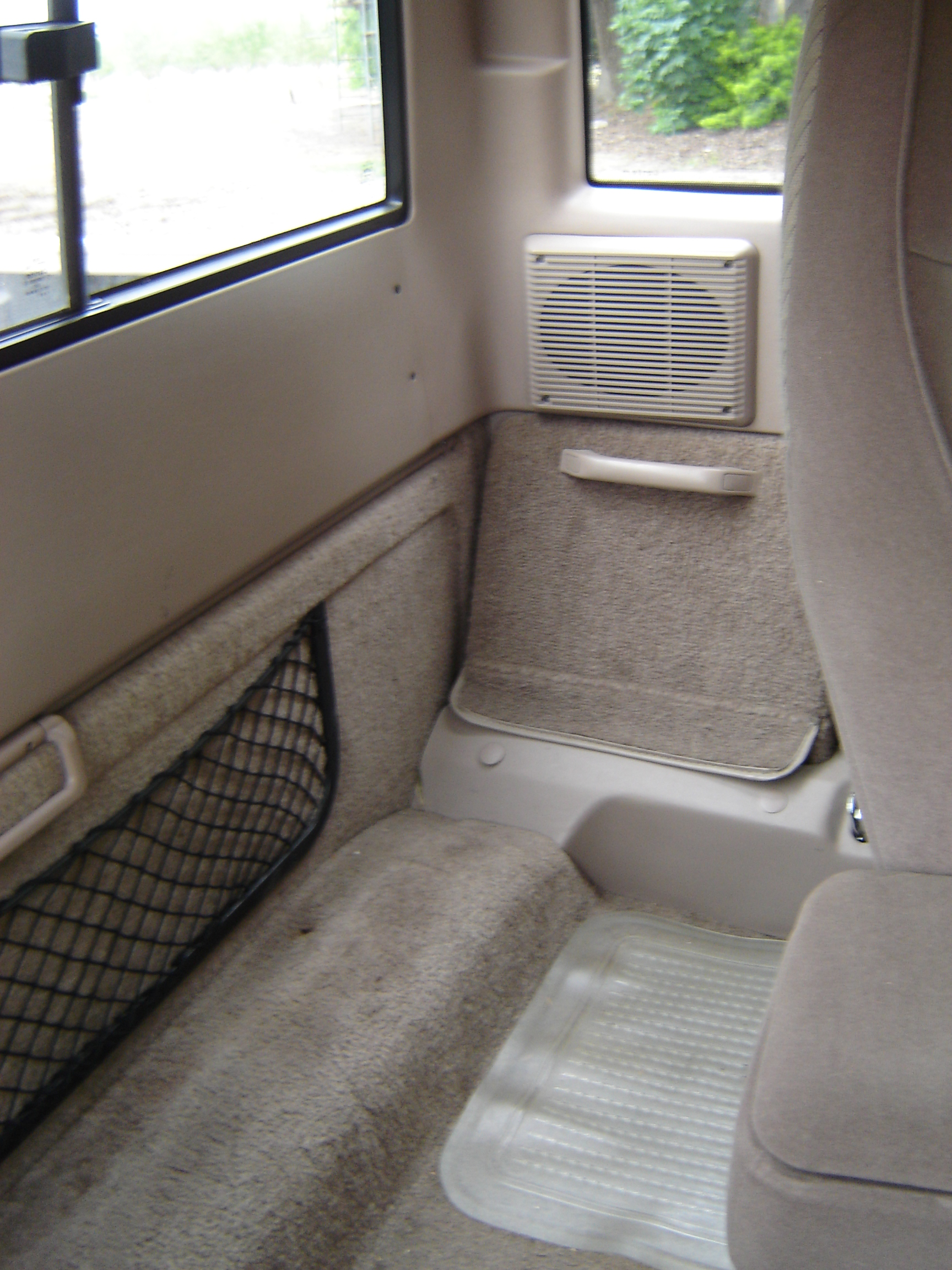
Ford Ranger SuperCab (jump seat stowed)

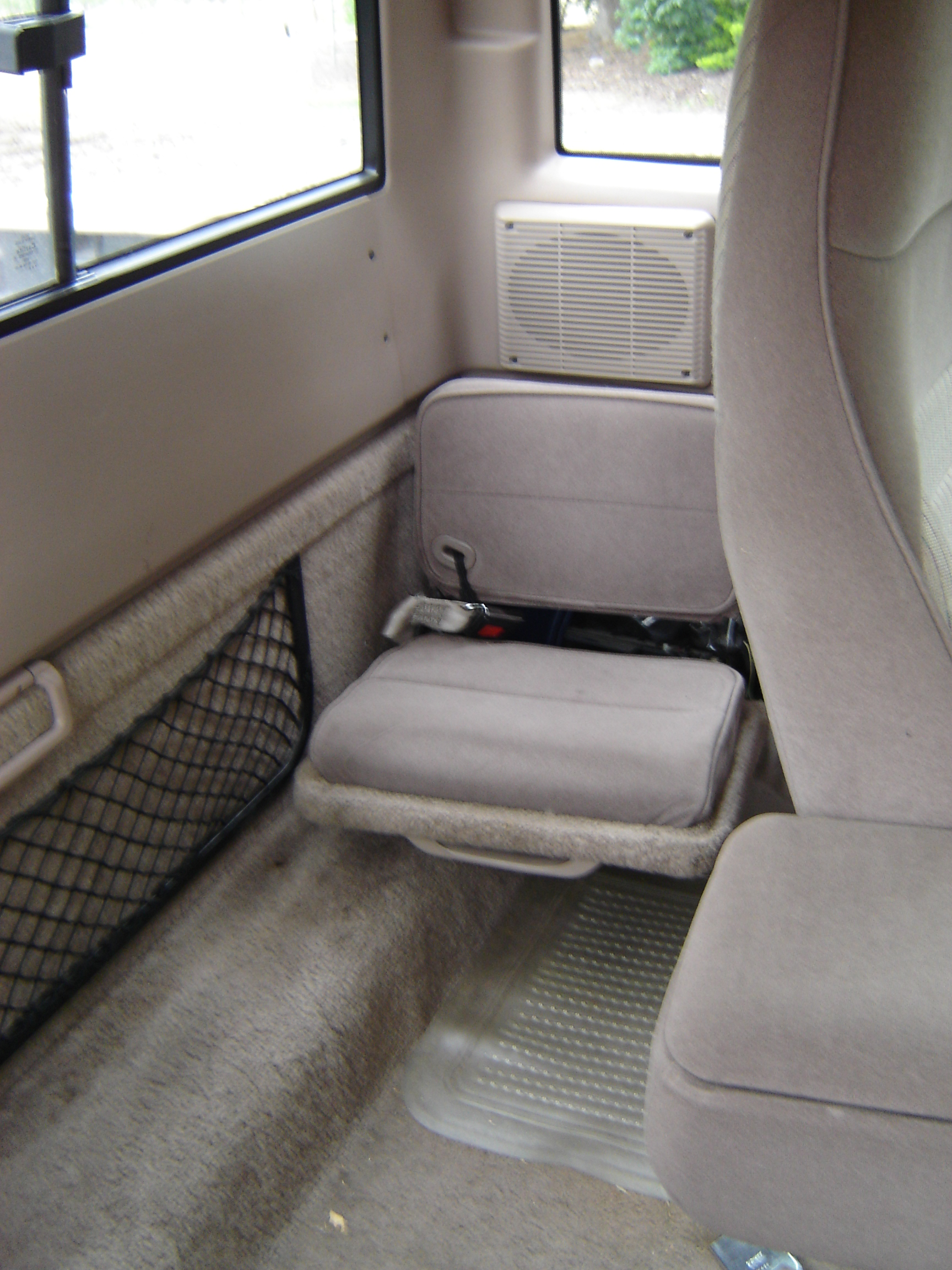
Ford Ranger SuperCab (jump seat in position)

The second-generation Ranger saw major changes centered around the exterior, sharing no body panels with its predecessor. In line with the Aerostar and Explorer, the Ranger adopted more aerodynamic body contours, with flush-mounted door glass, a lower hoodline, taller and wider doors (exterior rain gutters were eliminated, in line with the Ford Taurus); sideview mirror brackets were eliminated. In a major departure from other compact pickup trucks, the cab was widened nearly three inches, matching the mid-size Dodge Dakota in width.

The interior of the second-generation underwent a smaller degree of change (compared to the exterior). While the seats and door panels were new, the dashboard was nearly carryover from 1989 to 1992. For 1994, the instrument panel saw the introduction of a six-digit odometer; the doors saw the addition of side impact guard beams. In a functional change, the 1994 Ranger adopted R134a Freon (CFC-free) air conditioning.

For 1995, the Ranger underwent a mid-cycle revision for the exterior and interior. Distinguished by a revised grille (common for both rear-wheel drive and 4×4 Rangers), the 1995 Ranger shared its dashboard with the second-generation Explorer, with more ergonomic controls and a double DIN radio head unit. Alongside the introduction of a standard driver-side airbag, a power-operated driver seat became an option (for SuperCab Rangers). For 1996, a passenger-side airbag was introduced as an option; to allow the use of a child safety seat, a key-operated lockout was supplied with the airbag option.

As with the first generation, the second-generation Ranger was offered in three basic body styles: a regular cab with 6- or 7-foot bed lengths, or a SuperCab extended cab (with short bed). In 1992, Ford introduced the first FlareSide bed for the Ranger with the Splash trim (see below); in 1996, the FlareSide bed became an option for all short-bed Rangers. In a break from its predecessor, rear-wheel drive and 4×4 Rangers were fitted with different grille designs, with a six-hole design for 2WD models; 4×4 models were given a single-slot design. For 1995, all Rangers adopted a four-hole grille.

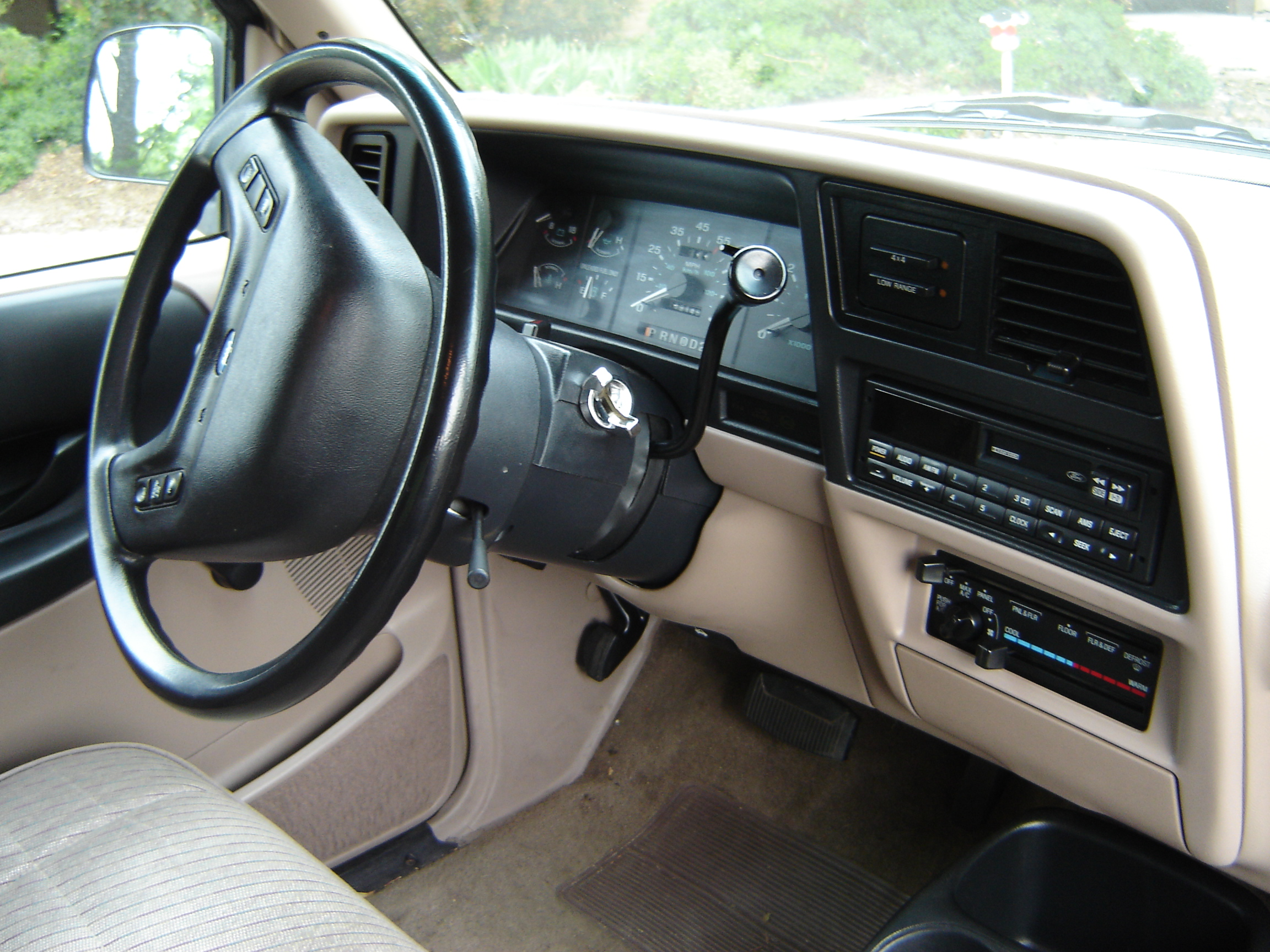
1993–1994 Ranger dashboard (1989–1992 are similar)

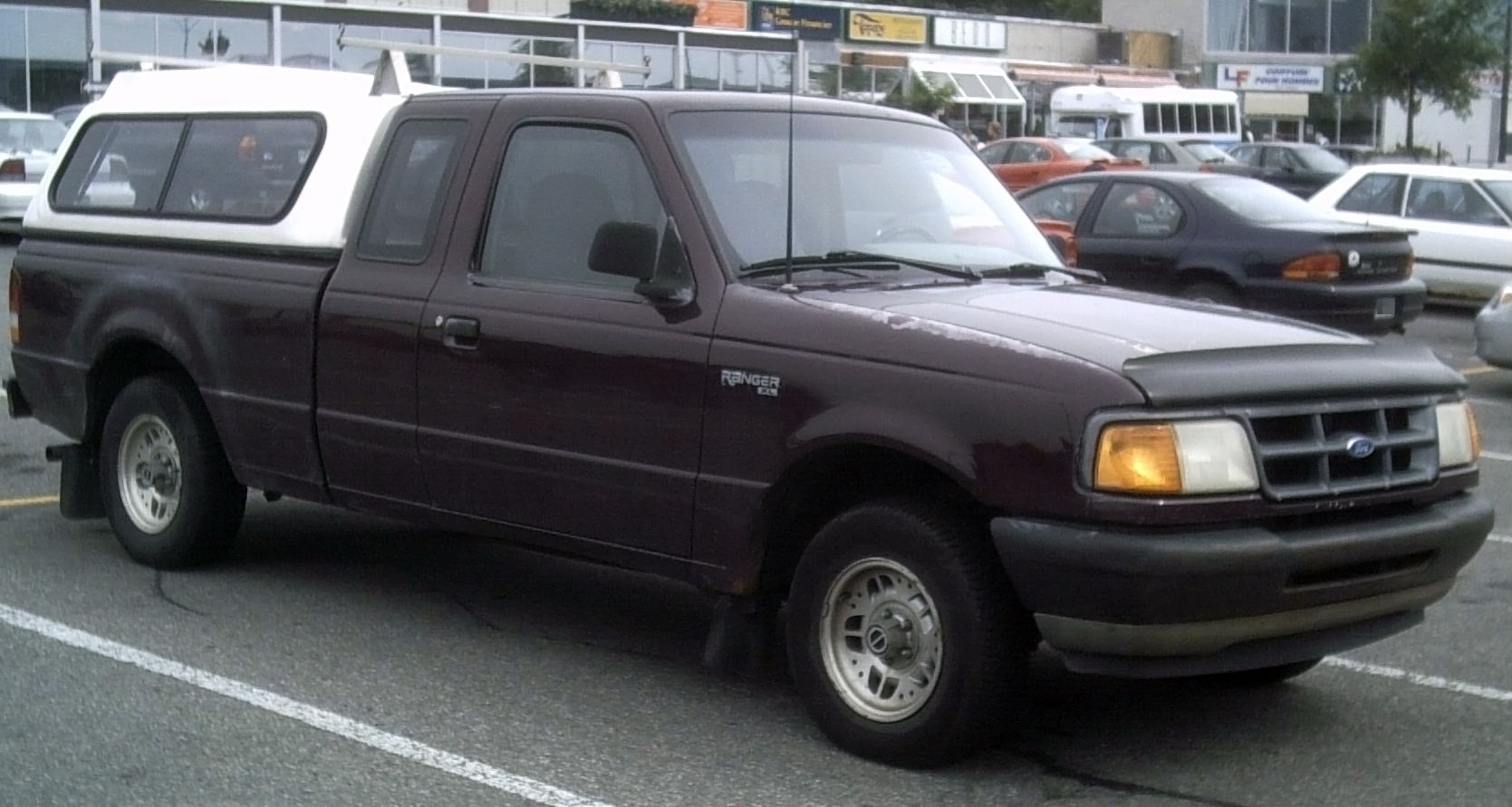
1993–1994 Ranger XL SuperCab

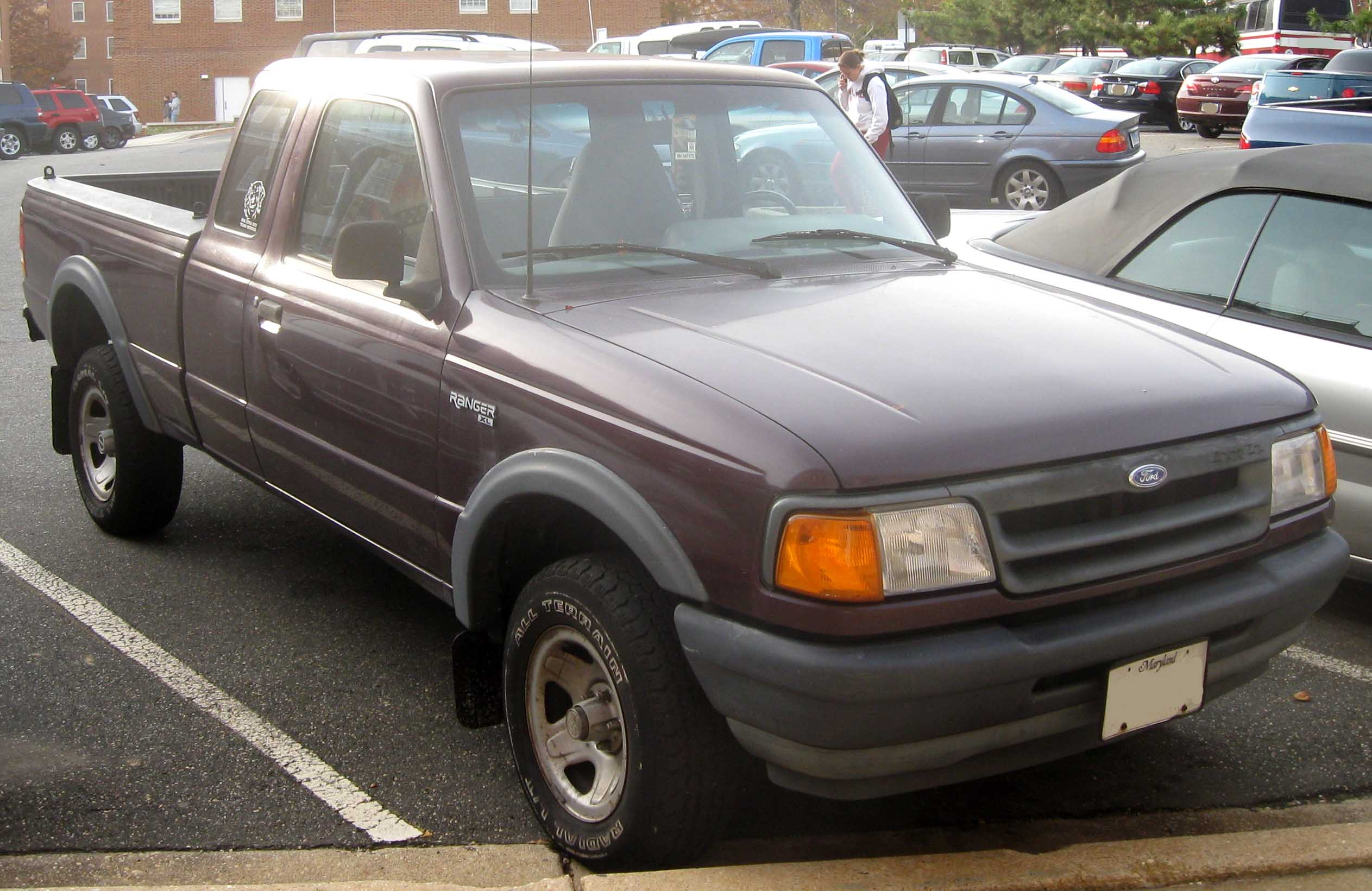
1993–1994 Ranger XL Sport 4×4

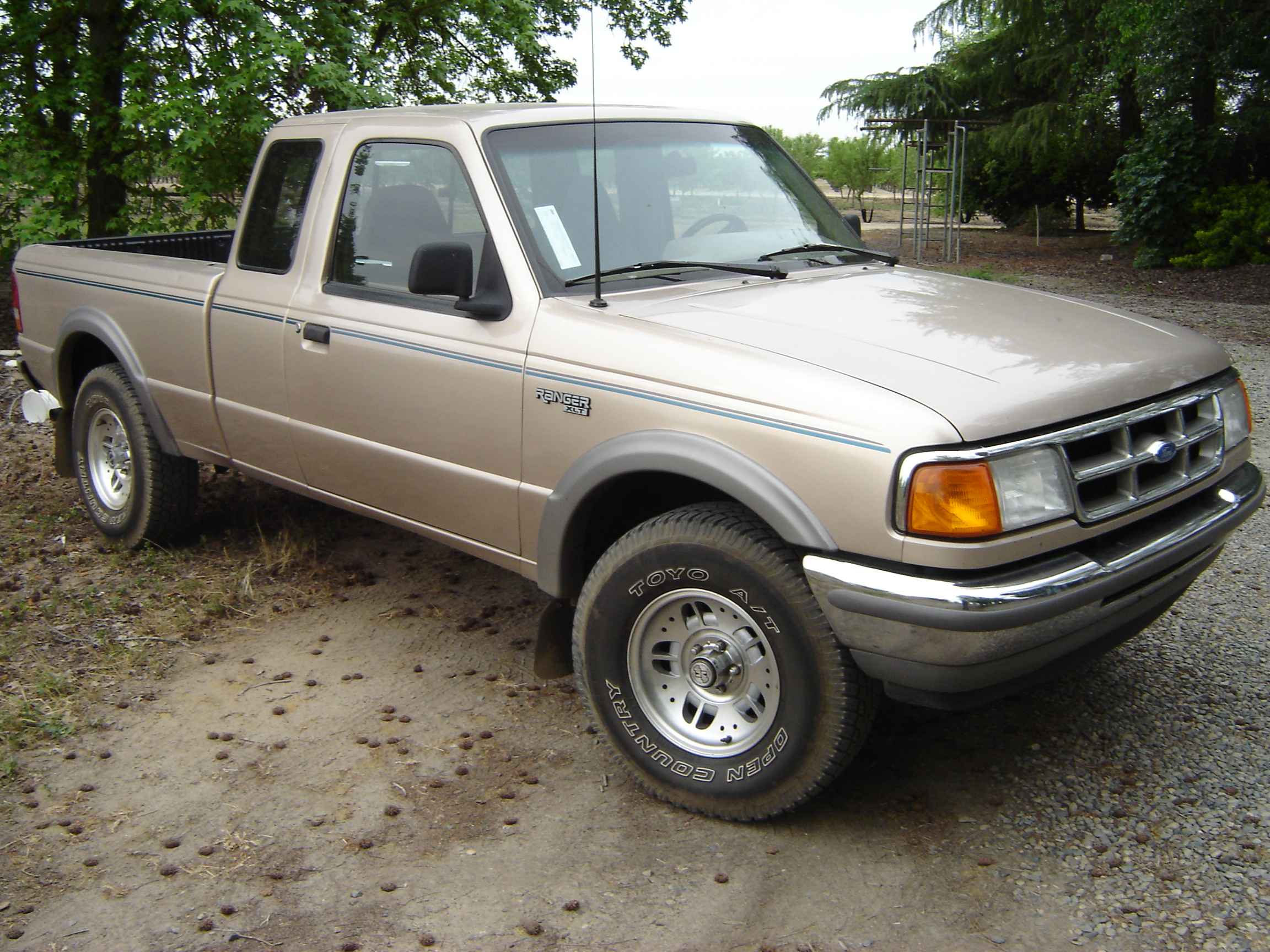
1994 Ford Ranger XLT 4×4

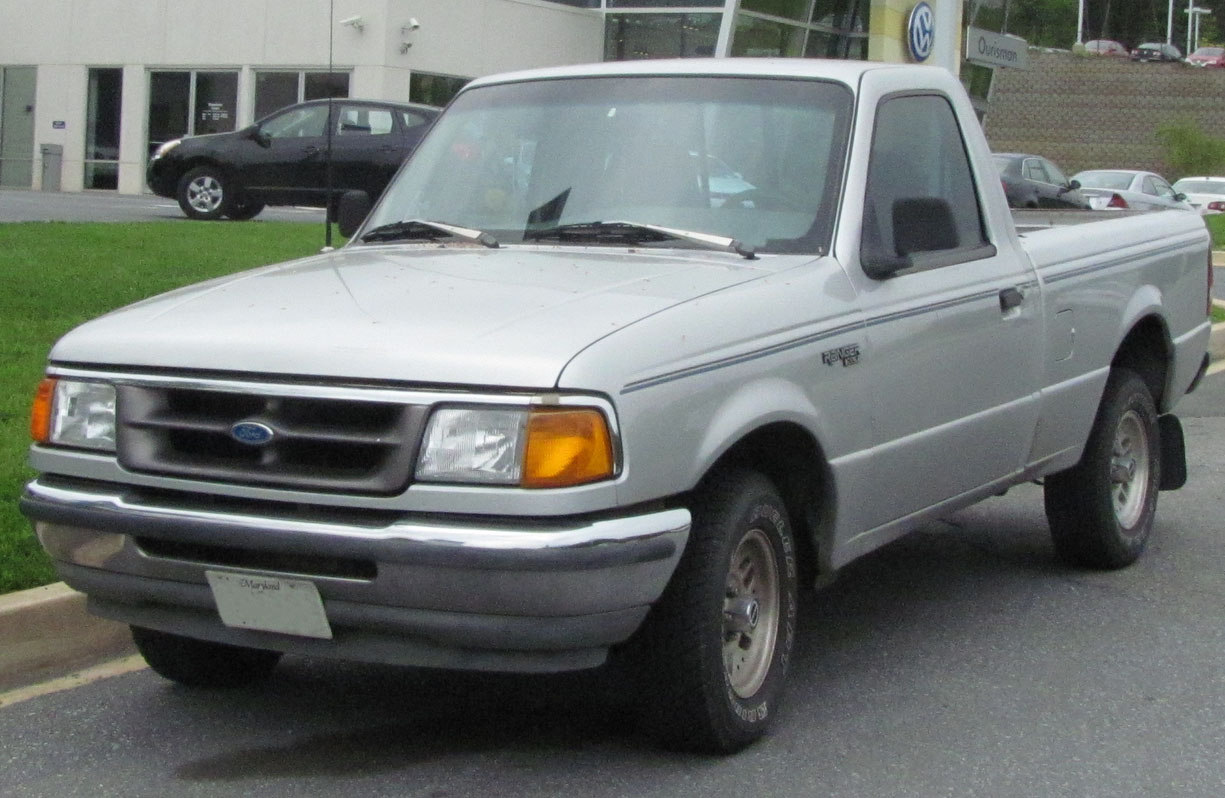
1995–1997 Ranger XLT

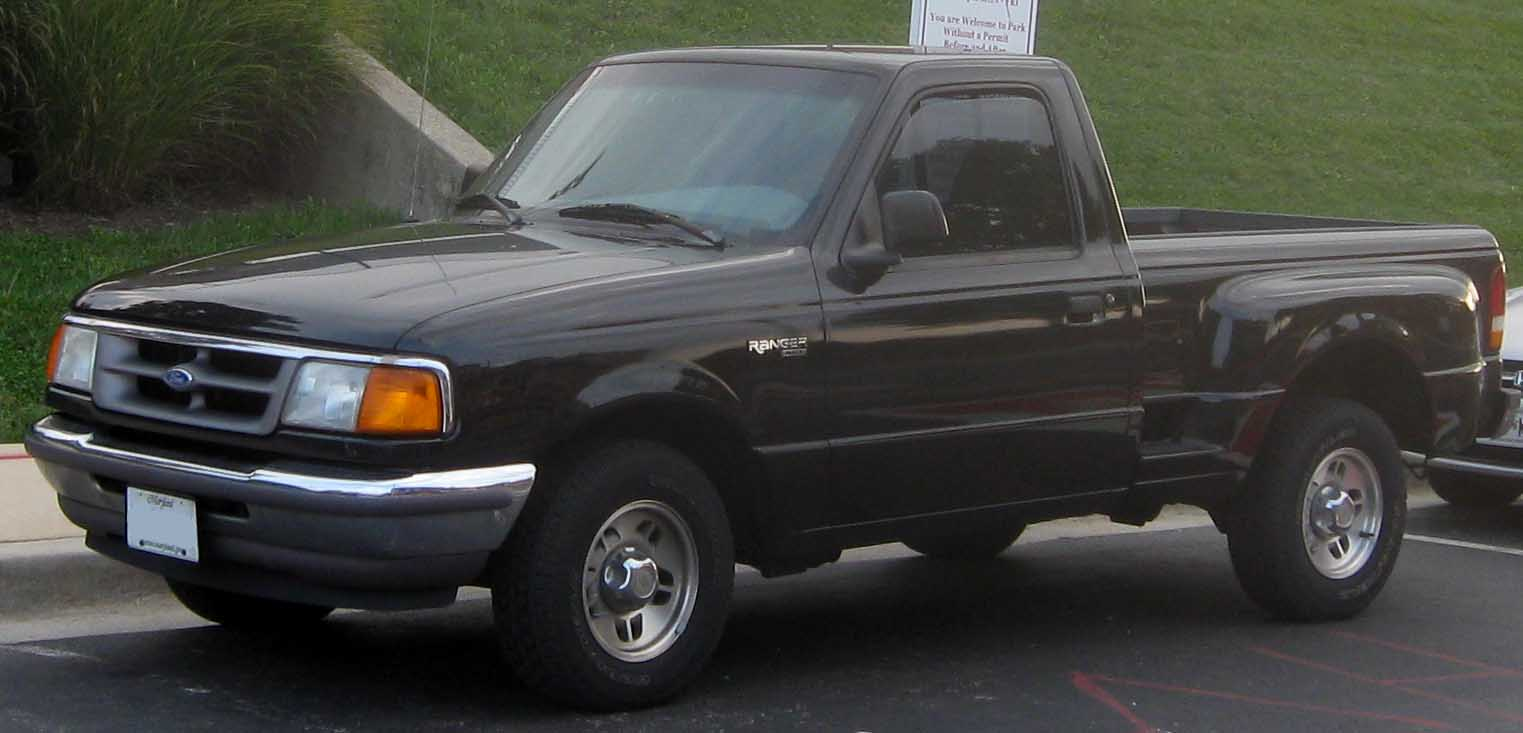
1996–1997 Ranger XLT Flareside

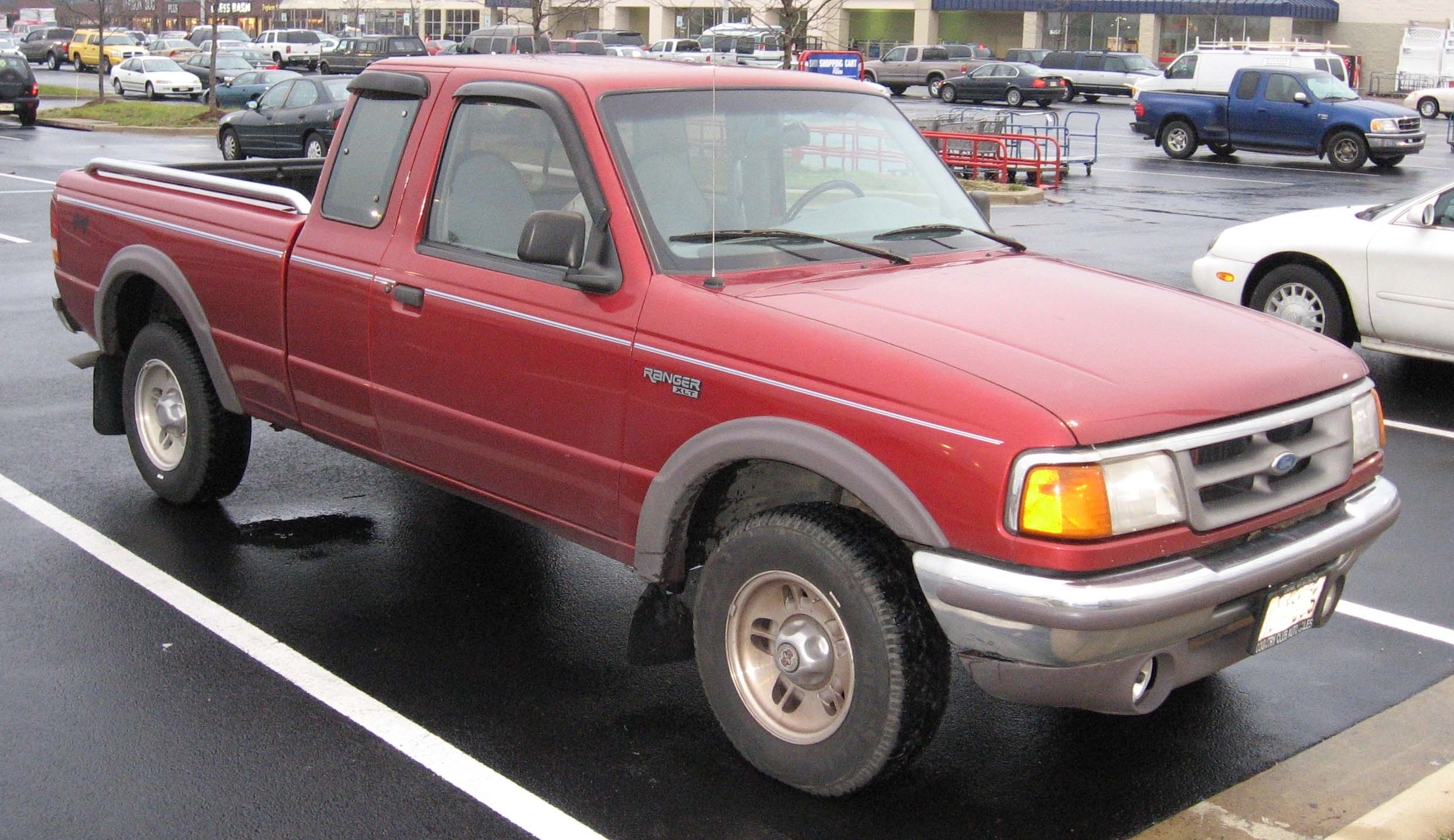
1995–1997 Ranger STX (XLT) 4x4

=== Trim ===
The second-generation Ranger largely carried over the trim lines from its predecessor. The base Ranger S (meant largely for fleets) was discontinued, with the XL becoming the standard Ranger trim. Alongside the standard XL was the XL Sport, Splash, XLT, and STX. For 1995, the STX trim became exclusive to 4×4 Rangers.

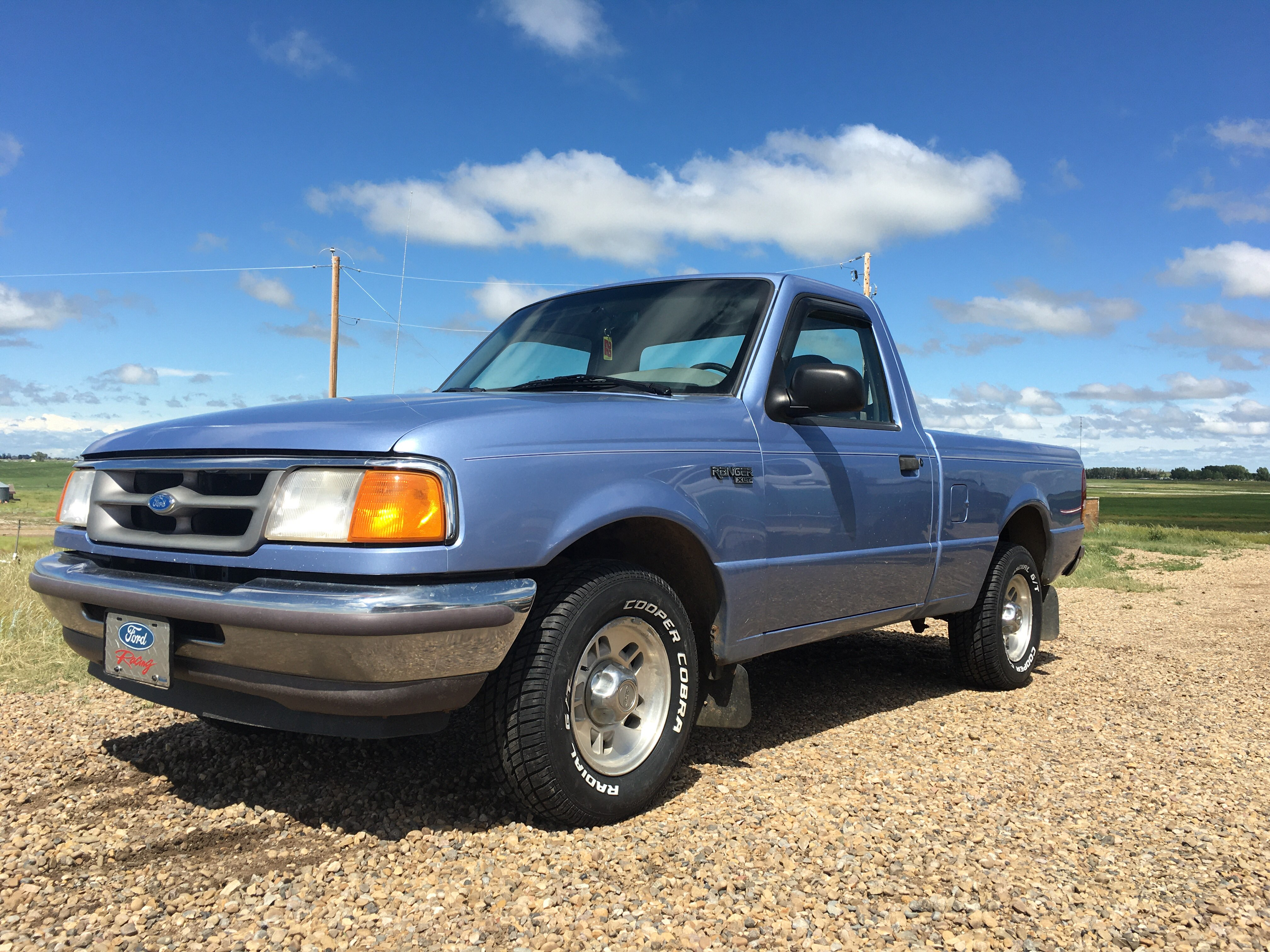
1997 Ranger XLT (Power Mirrors)

- XL – Included: Vinyl upholstery, bench seat, tinted glass, tachometer on 4×4, and steel rims.
- XL Sport – Added: sport tape stripe.
- XLT – Added: Floor consolette, cloth upholstery, an AM/FM stereo with clock, and full-faced steel wheels.
- STX – Added: cloth upholstery, captains chairs with floor console, power steering, an AM/FM stereo with cassette player and clock, and tachometer.

==== Ranger Splash ====
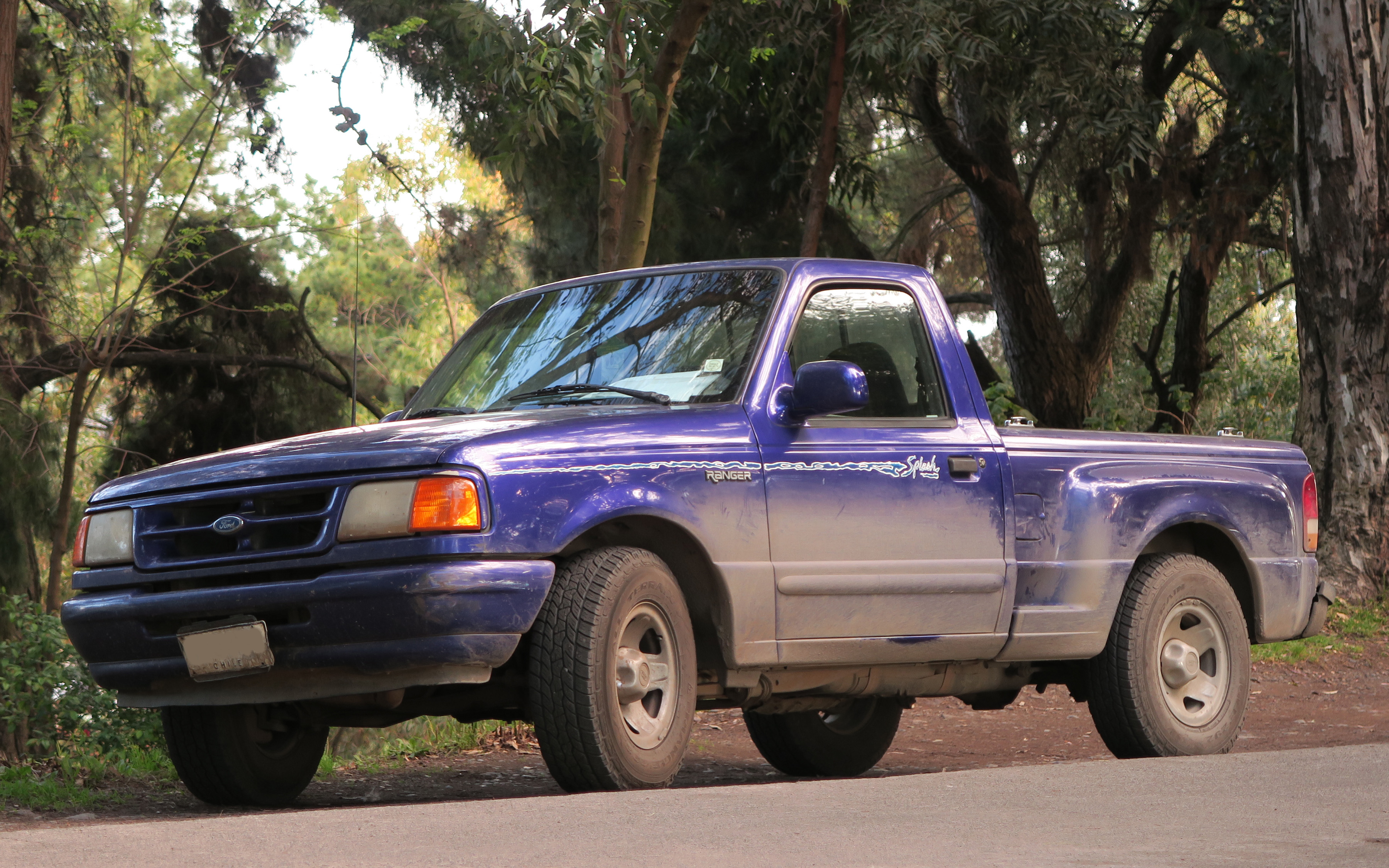
1995 Ford Ranger Splash (regular cab)

Introduced for the 1993 model year, the Ranger Splash was a sub-model of the second-generation Ranger. Alongside the Flareside pickup bed, the Splash was fitted with a lowered suspension (1 inch in rear, 2 inches in front for 2WD versions); all versions were fitted with 4×4 Ranger grilles. The monochromatic exterior was fitted with special vinyl "Splash" decals on the sides and the tailgate. The Splash models offered optional bucket seats with a console, and optional electronic side mirrors.

Rear-wheel-drive Splashes were fitted with chrome steel wheels, while 4×4 versions were fitted with aluminum wheels.

== Third generation (1998) ==
Third generation
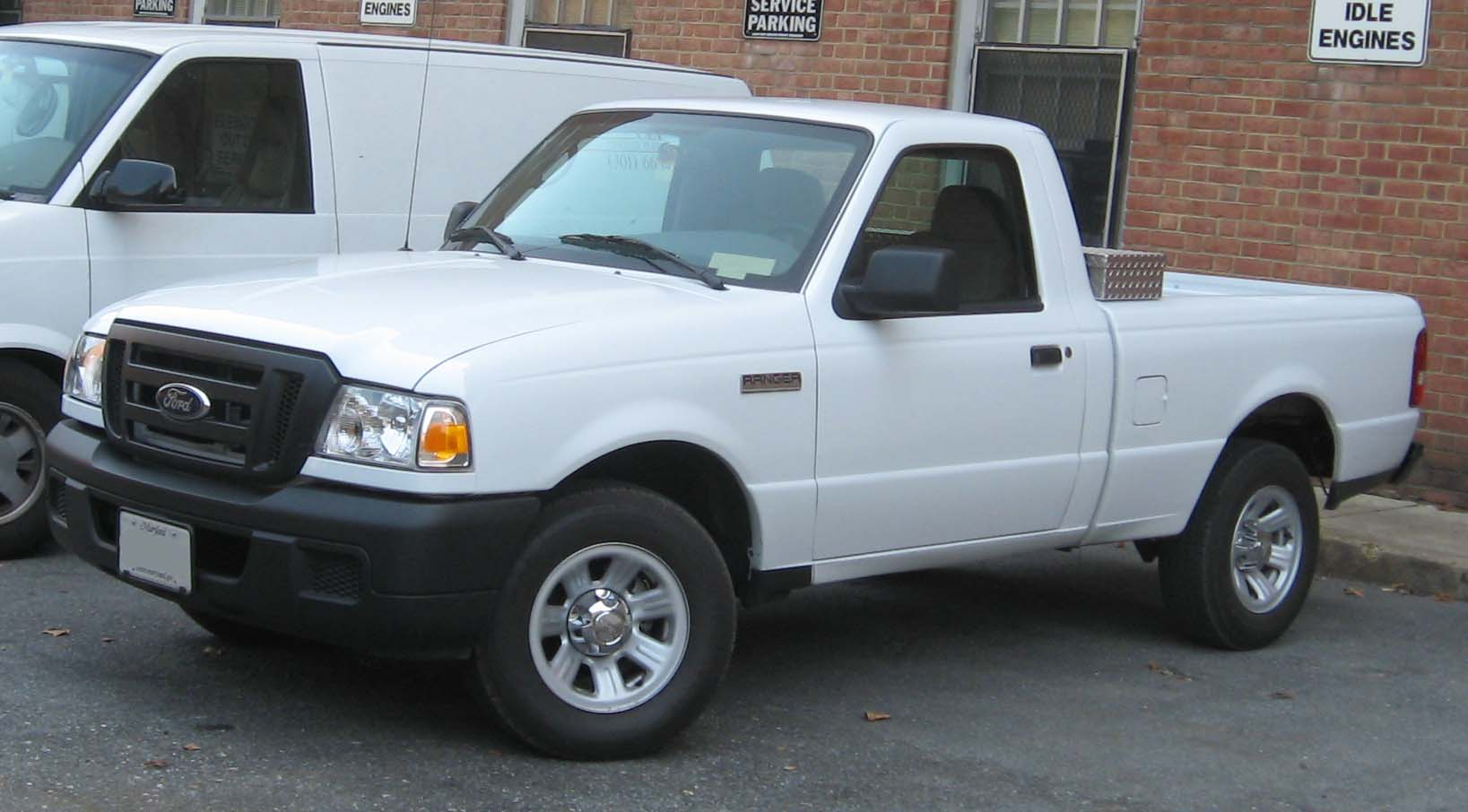
- 2006–2008 version

Overview
- Also called: Mazda B Series
- Production: August 1997 – December 16, 2011
- Model years: 1998–2011 (USA & Canada); 1998–2012 (South America and Mexico)
- Assembly: United States: St. Paul, Minnesota; United States: Edison, New Jersey; Argentina: General Pacheco

Body and chassis
- Body style: 2-door regular cab pickup 2-door extended cab pickup (1998–2012); 4-door extended cab pickup (1999–2012); 4-door crew cab pickup (South America)
- Related: Ford Explorer Sport Trac

Powertrain
- Engine: Gasoline: 2.3 L Duratec DOHC I4; 2.5 L Pinto LL25 I4; 3.0 L Vulcan OHV V6 (gasoline/E85); 4.0 L Cologne OHV V6; 4.0 L Cologne SOHC V6
- Transmission: Manual: 5-speed Mazda M5OD-R1; Automatic: 4-speed 4R44E; 5-speed 5R55E

Dimensions
- Wheelbase: 111.6 in (2,835 mm); 117.6 in (2,987 mm); 125.9 in (3,198 mm)
- Length: 188.5 in (4,788 mm); 200.5 in (5,093 mm); 202.9 in (5,154 mm)
- Width: 70.3 in (1,786 mm)
- Height: 68.3 in (1,735 mm); 69.4 in (1,763 mm)

For the 1998 model year, a third generation of the Ranger made its debut. While visually similar to the previous generation, extensive upgrades were made to the chassis, suspension, and drivetrain. In line with the larger F-150 and Super Duty trucks, SuperCab Rangers gained the option of two rear-hinged doors for 1999, becoming the first model line in the compact truck segment to do so.

Several variants of the Ranger were derived from this generation. Ford of Argentina introduced a crew-cab variant of the Ranger for South America in 1998; the Ford Ranger EV was the first electric vehicle produced by Ford in the United States. The Ford Explorer Sport Trac mid-size pickup truck shared its wheelbase (and some components) with the Ranger.

The 2011 model year was the final model year for regular sales of the Ranger in North America; following a short run of 2012 production exclusively for fleet sales, the final vehicle was produced by Twin Cities Assembly on December 15, 2011; the 2012 Ranger Sport SuperCab 4×4 was the final vehicle produced by the facility.

=== Chassis specification ===
The third-generation Ranger received a redesigned frame; replacing full-length C-channel construction, the frame rails forward of the firewall became fully boxed. Coinciding with the larger two-door cab, wheelbases were lengthened, with the model line offered in 111.6 inches (two-door, 6-foot bed), 117.6 inches (two-door, 7-foot bed), and 125.9 inches (2+2 door SuperCab, 6-foot bed).

As with the two previous generations, a rear-wheel drive configuration was standard; on four-wheel drive, front-wheel hubs were vacuum-locked from the dashboard. From 2001 onward, the vacuum-locked front hubs were replaced by front hubs that were permanently engaged to the front axle.

Following the 1995 Ford Explorer and 1997 Ford F-150, the third-generation Ranger abandoned the long-running Twin I-Beam front suspension, introducing a short/long-arm (SLA) configuration. To further improve handling, recirculating-ball steering was replaced by a rack-and-pinion steering configuration.

==== Powertrain ====
From 1998 to 2001, the standard engine for the Ranger was a new 2.5 L version of the Lima four-cylinder, with the stroke increased by 7 mm (0.28 in) over the previous 2.3 L unit. Additionally, a higher-flow cylinder head using narrower 7 mm (0.28 in) valve stems was fitted and eight crank counterbalance weights were now used instead of four. With the larger displacement and other changes it now produced 117 hp (87 kW). The optional 3.0 L Vulcan V6 and 4.0 L Cologne V6 engines carried over. During the 2001 model year, the 2.5 L engine was replaced by a 2.3 L DOHC engine (later also used by the Ford Focus). The same year, the Ranger adopted the overhead-cam version of the 4.0 L V6 (originally introduced in the Explorer). Following the 2008 model year, the 3.0 L V6 ended production, the Ranger having been the sole vehicle offered with the engine by that time.

For all five engines, the third-generation Ranger was offered with a Mazda-produced 5-speed manual transmission as standard equipment; in 2001, the 4.0 L V6 was paired with the heavier-duty M5OD-R1HD version. The 2.5 L I4 was offered with an optional 4-speed automatic along with the 3.0 L V6; in 2001, a 5-speed automatic became an option for those engines.

1998–2012 Ranger powertrain details
Engine	Configuration	Production	Maximum Output	Transmission
Ford Pinto LL25 I4	153 cu in (2.5 L) SOHC I4	1998 – early 2001	1998–1999: 117 hp (87 kW) 149 lb⋅ft (202 N⋅m); 2000–2001: 119 hp (89 kW) 146 lb⋅ft (198 N⋅m)	Mazda 5-speed M5OD-R1 manual Ford 4R44E 4-speed automatic
Ford Duratec I4 (Mazda L3-NS)	138 cu in (2.3 L) DOHC 16V I4	Late 2001 – 2012	2001–2003: 135 hp (101 kW) 153 lb⋅ft (207 N⋅m); 2004–2011: 143 hp (107 kW) 154 lb⋅ft (209 N⋅m)	Mazda 5-speed M5OD-R1 manual Ford 5R55E 5-speed automatic
Ford Vulcan V6	182 cu in (3.0 L) OHV V6	1998–2008	1998–1999: 145 hp (108 kW)178 lb⋅ft (241 N⋅m); 2000–2001:150 hp (112 kW) 190 lb⋅ft (258 N⋅m); 2002: 146 hp (109 kW) 180 lb⋅ft (244 N⋅m); 2003–2004: 154 hp (115 kW) 180 lb⋅ft (244 N⋅m); 2005–2008: 148 hp (110 kW) 180 lb⋅ft (244 N⋅m)	Mazda 5-speed M5OD-R1 manual Ford 4R44E 4-speed automatic (1998-2000); Ford 5R44E 5-speed automatic (2001-2008)
Ford Cologne V6	245 cu in (4.0 L) OHV V6	1998–2000	160 hp (119 kW) 225 lb⋅ft (305 N⋅m)	Mazda 5-speed M5OD-R1 manual Ford 5R55E 5-speed automatic
Ford Cologne SOHC V6	245 cu in (4.0 L) SOHC V6	2001–2012	207 hp (154 kW) 238 lb⋅ft (323 N⋅m)	Mazda 5-speed M5OD-R1HD manual Ford 5R55E 5-speed automatic

=== Body design ===
In contrast to its 1993 redesign, the third-generation Ranger saw relatively conservative changes to its appearance. To increase interior space on regular-cab Rangers, the cab was expanded over 3 inches rearward (through a longer wheelbase). Through the deletion of Twin-I-Beam suspension, designers were able to lower the hoodline, which was introduced with new fenders and a grille (sharing design influences from the 1997 F-150). With the exception of a passenger-airbag lockout switch, the interior saw little change since its 1995 redesign.

The third-generation Ranger saw several updates through its production. For 2001, the front fascia was redesigned with a new grille and headlamps; the amber turn signals were deleted from the taillamps. For 2004, the grille was enlarged (in the style of the F-150); for the first time since 1995, the interior saw several revisions, with new front seats (to meet updated federal safety requirements) and a new instrument panel (new digital odometer) and steering wheel. 2005 marked the final year for the FlareSide bed option.

For 2006, the Ranger received its final major exterior update (as the model line was planned for a 2008 discontinuation). The grille was restyled into a "3-slot" configuration (in line with the F-Series), adding clear-lens headlamps and parking lamps; the sideview mirrors were replaced with a rectangular design. The rear of the Ranger underwent several changes, with redesigned taillamps and a larger Ford Blue Oval centred on the tailgate. For the first time since 1989, the Ranger fender badging was redesigned (with a larger design).

For 2007, the Ranger received several interior updates including a slightly altered steering wheel design, updated power equipment controls, an updated headlight control switch, and an MP3 auxiliary jack standard in place of where the airbag key-switch once was. Aside from an ESC button in 2010, this would mark the final cosmetic update for the Ford Ranger’s interior up until discontinuation in 2011.

For the 2010 model year, Ford introduced optional graphics packages for the Ranger, installed by dealers. The extended-length bed was removed from retail sale, becoming exclusive to the XL Fleet model.

From 2004-2009, Rangers equipped with the Pioneer 290 watt audio package were given a large full split centre console.

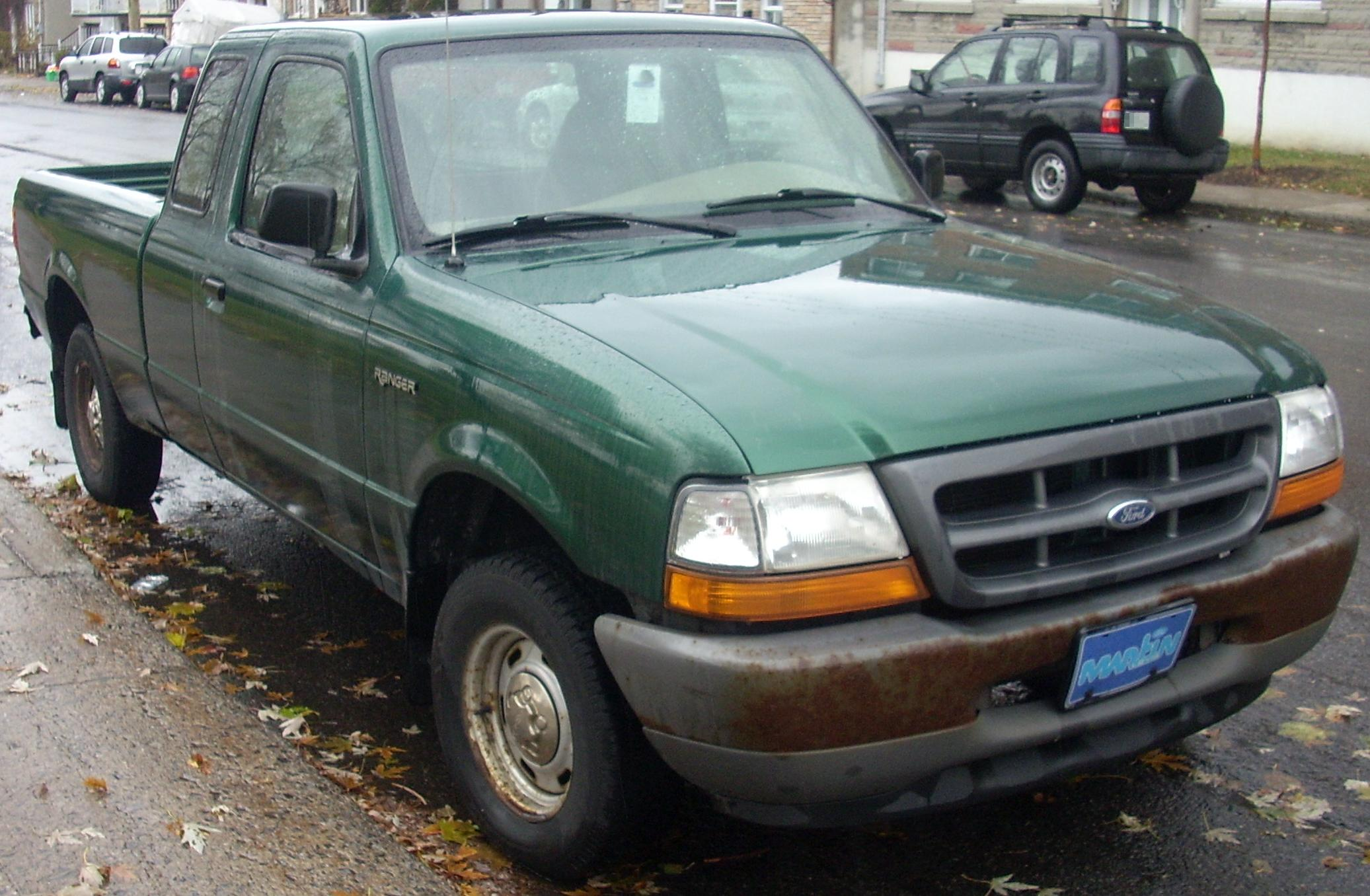
1998–2000 Ford Ranger XL SuperCab

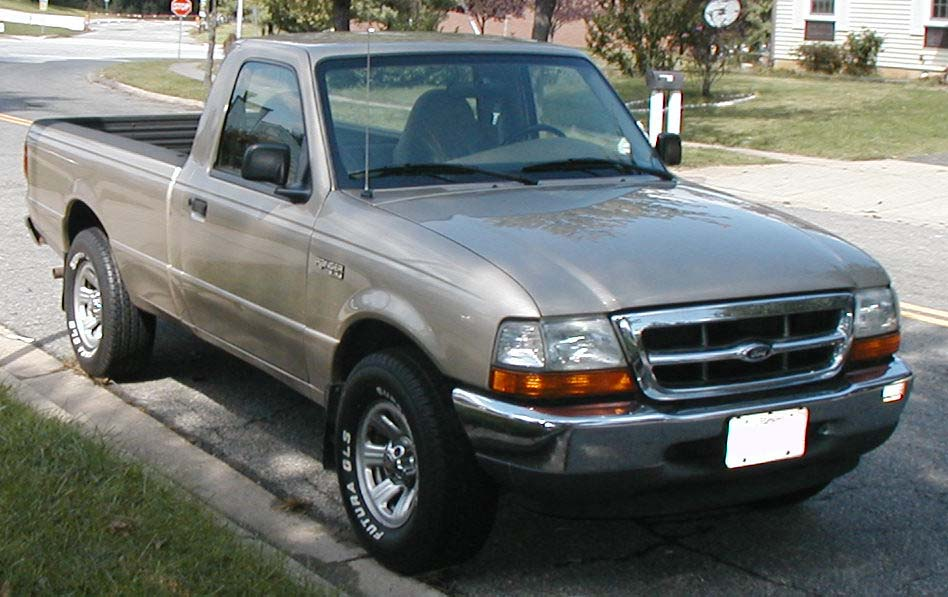
1998–2000 Ford Ranger XLT

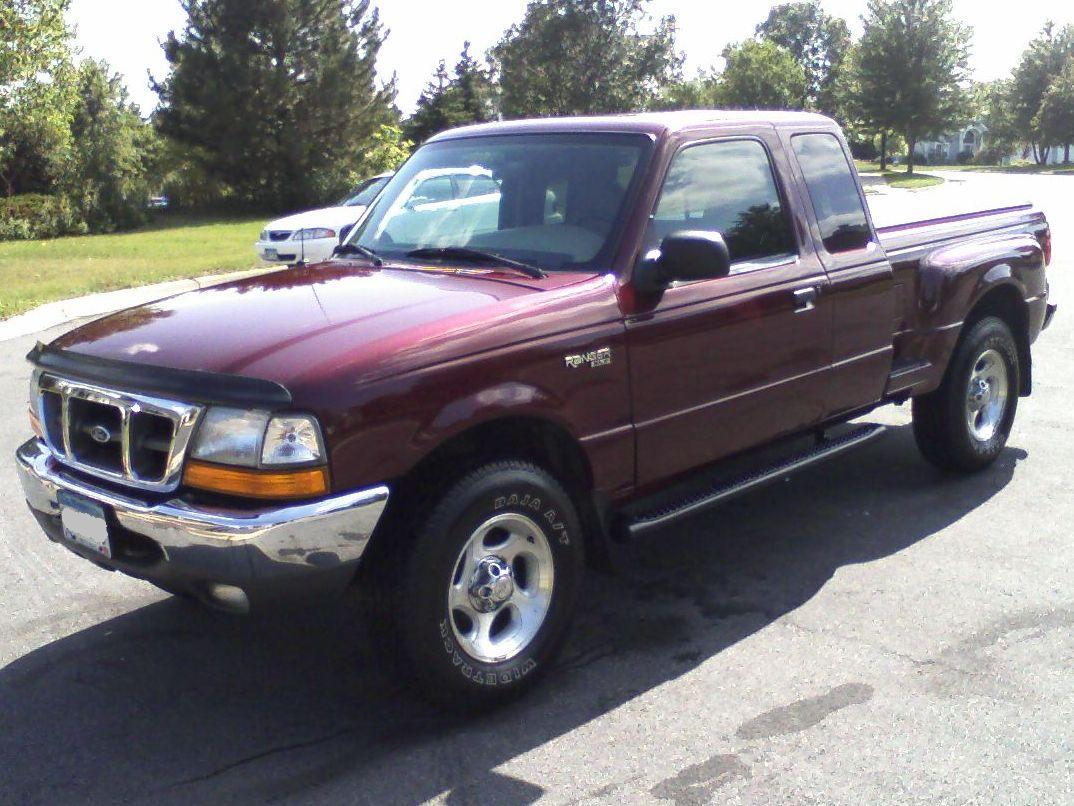
2000 Ford Ranger XLT Flareside

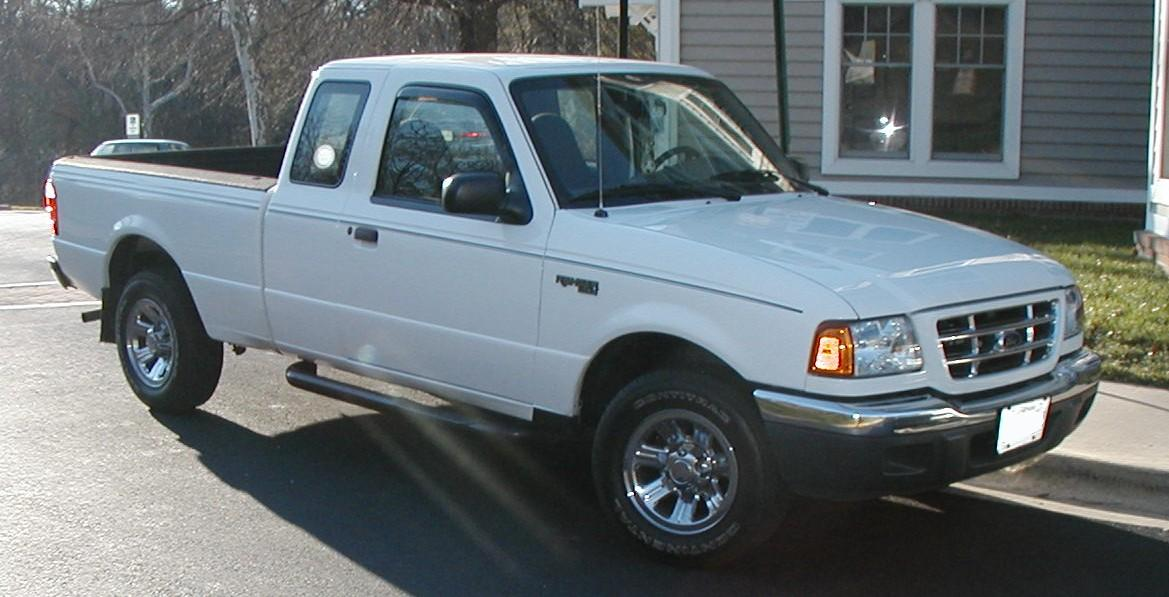
2001–2003 Ford Ranger XLT SuperCab

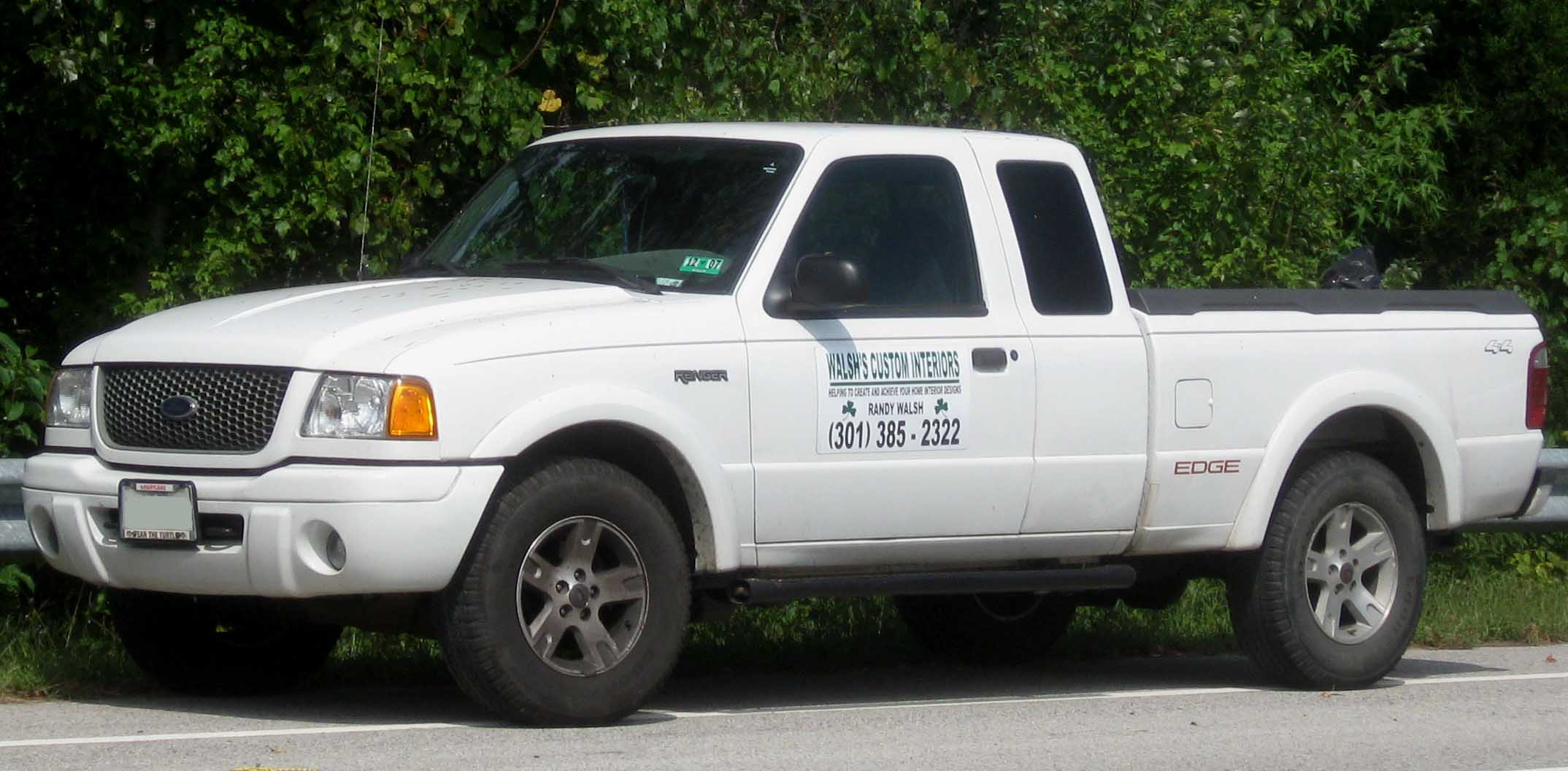
2001–2003 Ford Ranger Edge SuperCab

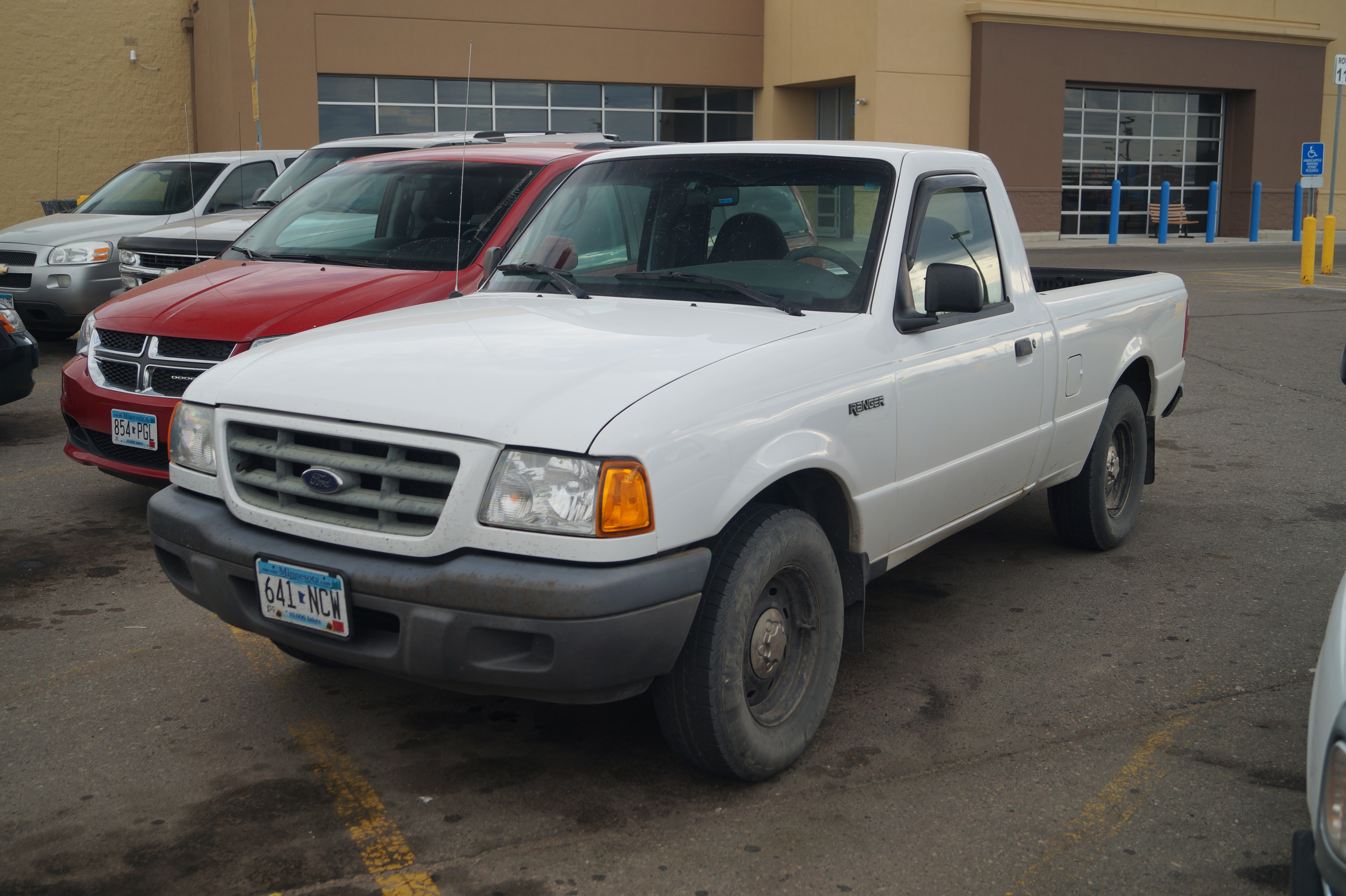
2003 Ford Ranger XL

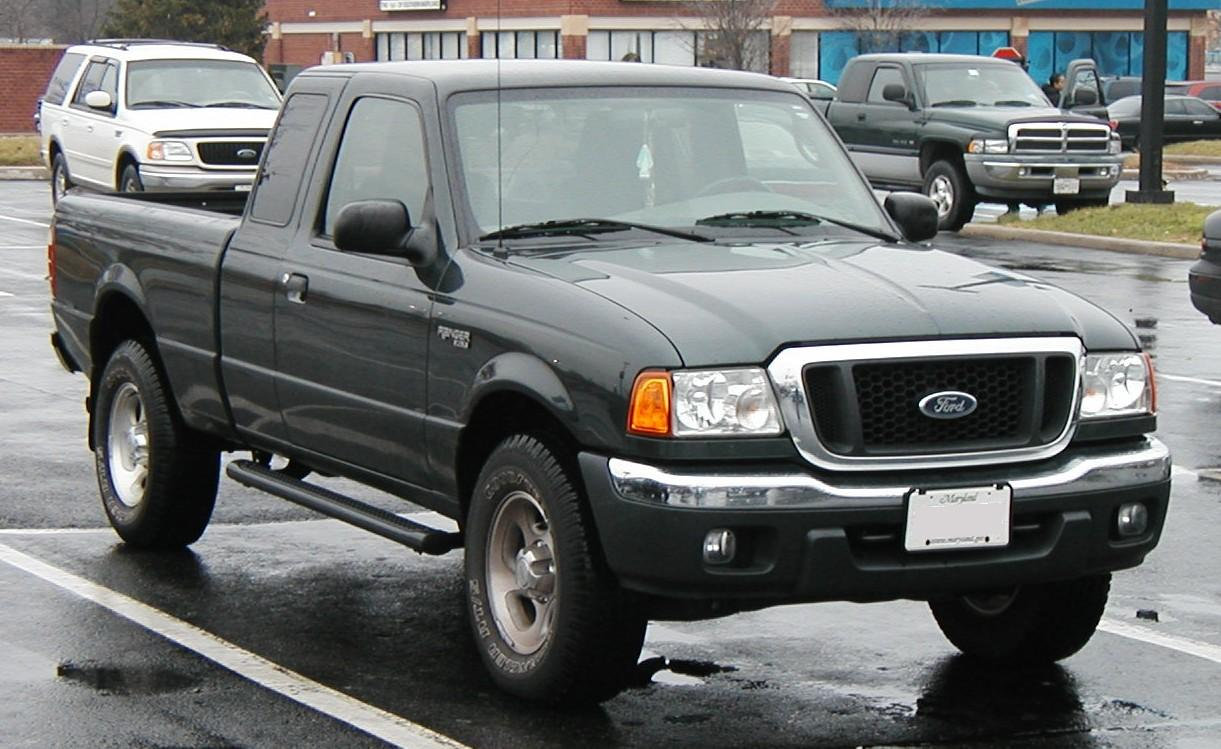
2004–2005 Ford Ranger XLT SuperCab 4×4

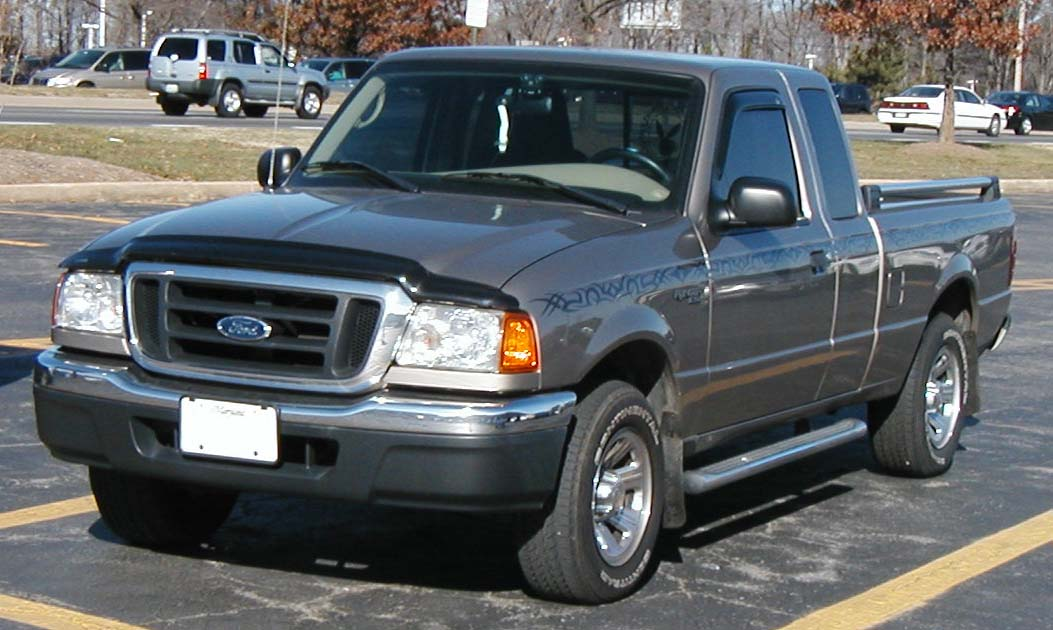
2004–2005 Ford Ranger XLT SuperCab

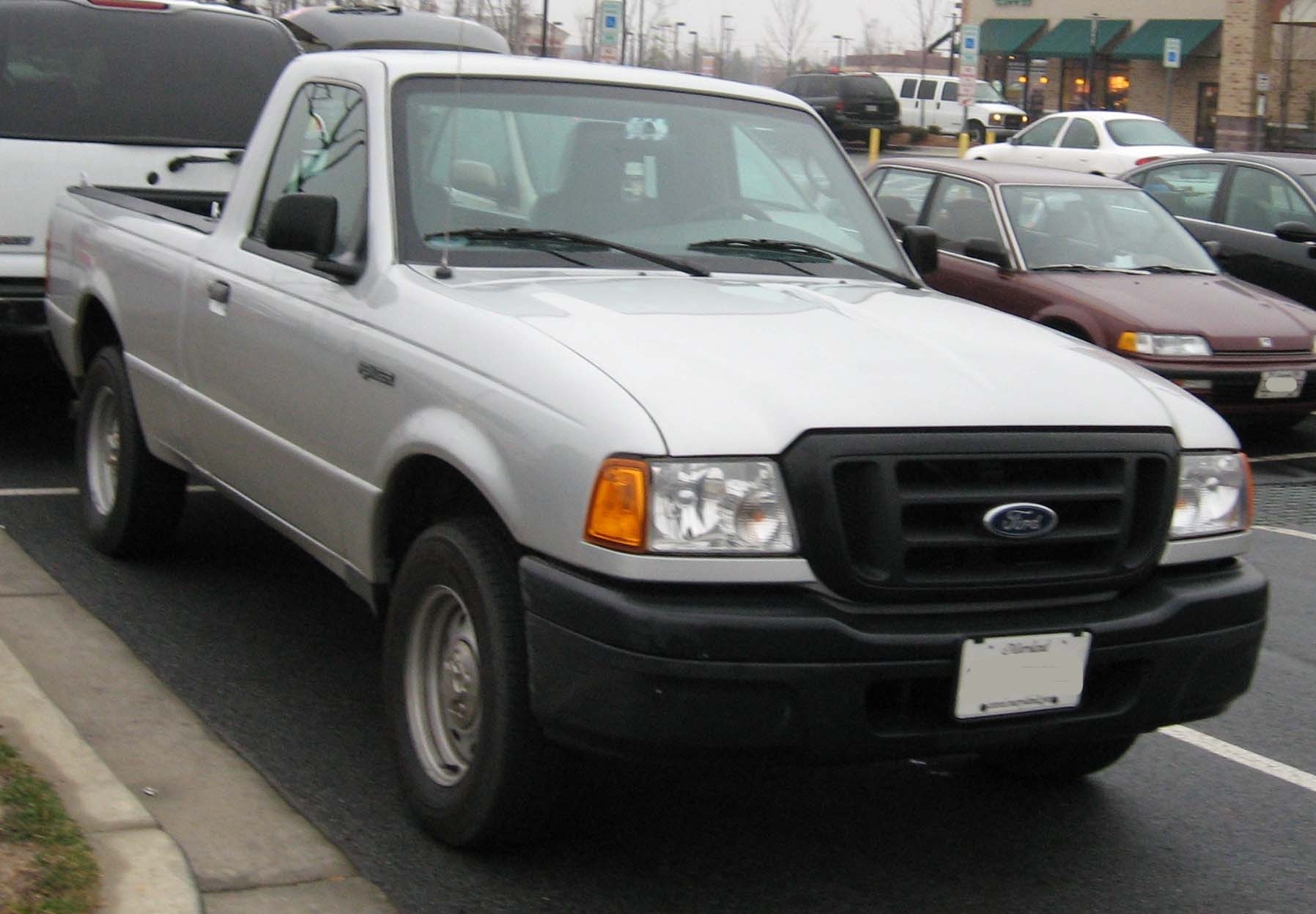
2004–2005 Ford Ranger XL

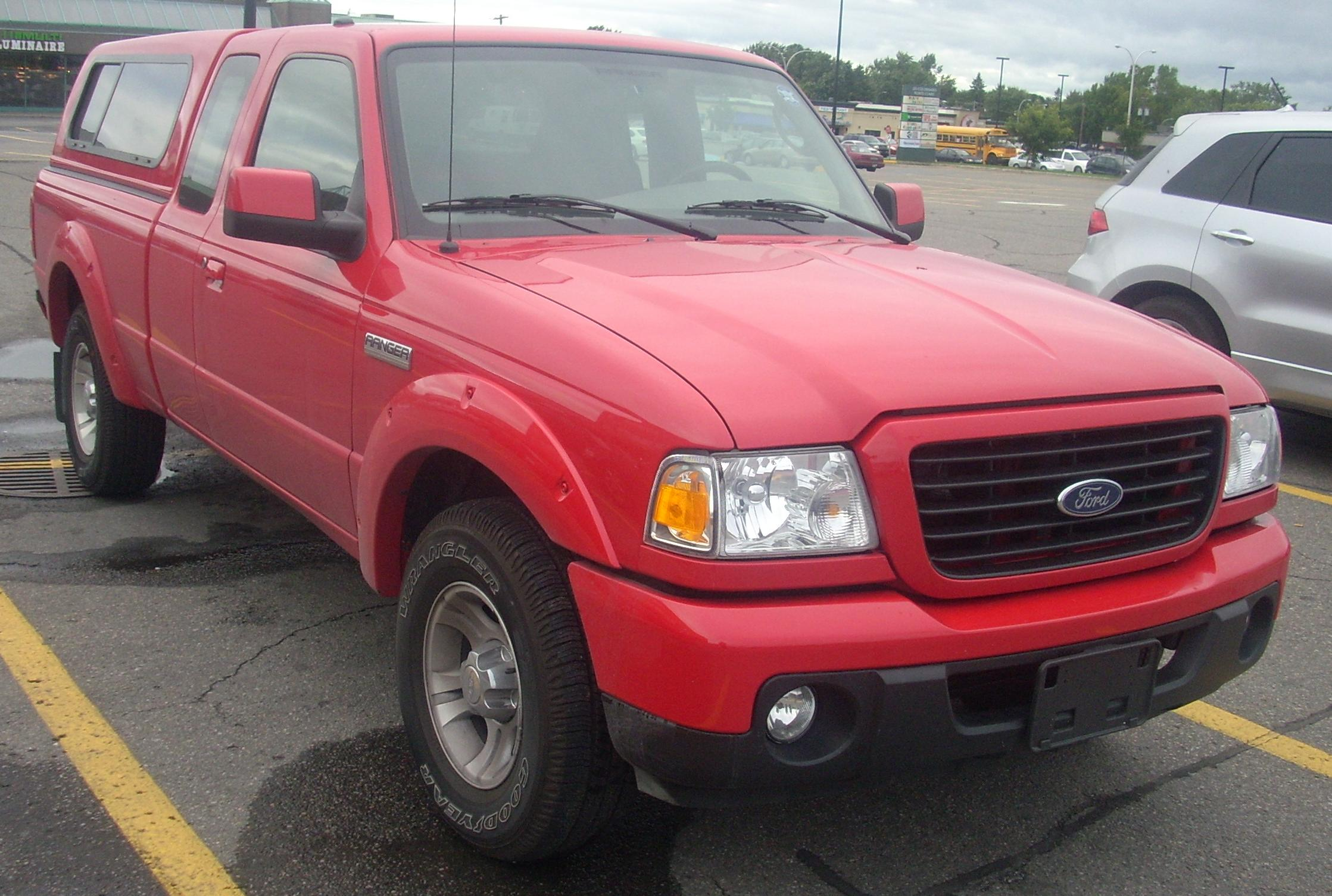
2006–2008 Ford Ranger STX SuperCab

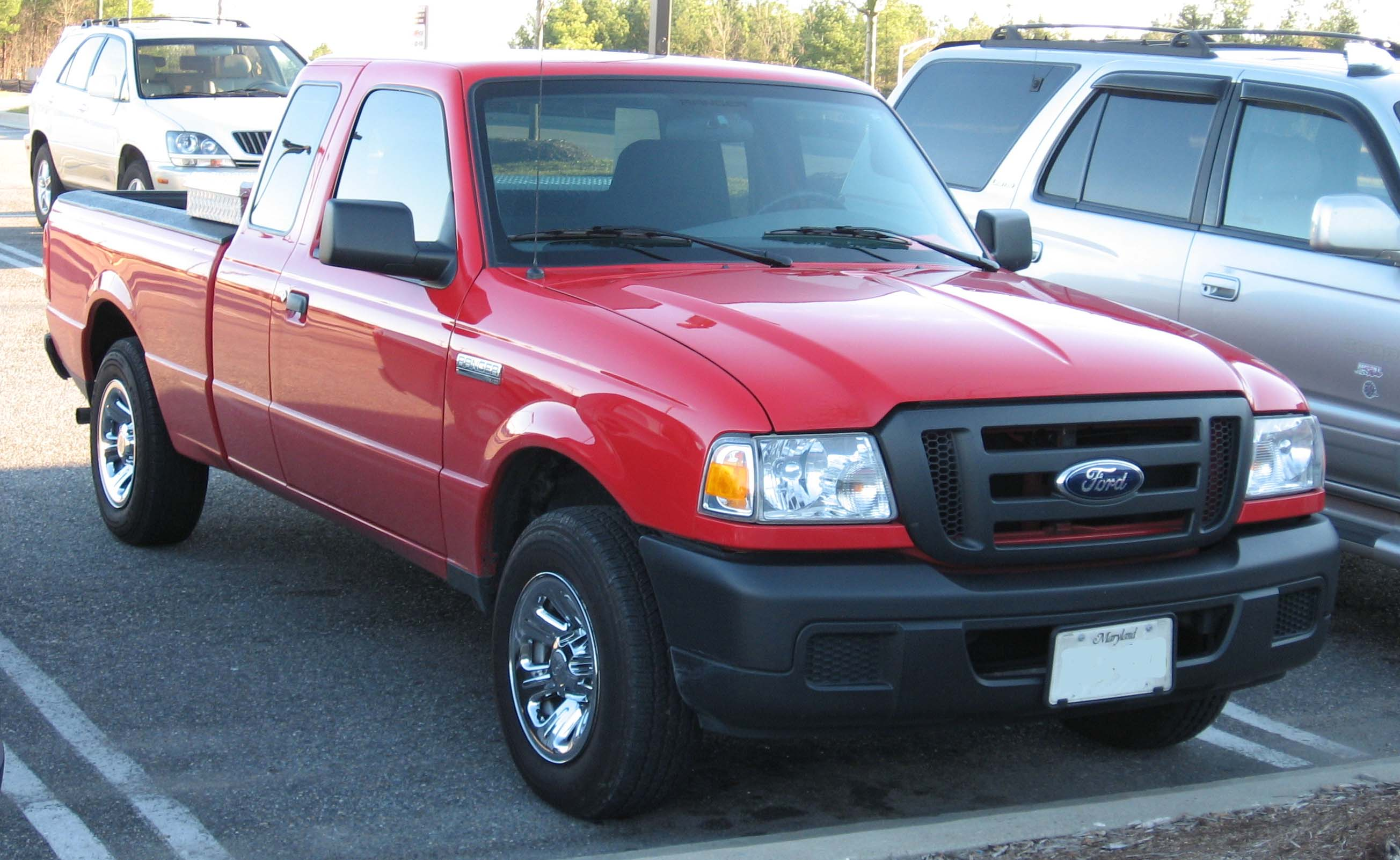
2006–2007 Ford Ranger XL SuperCab

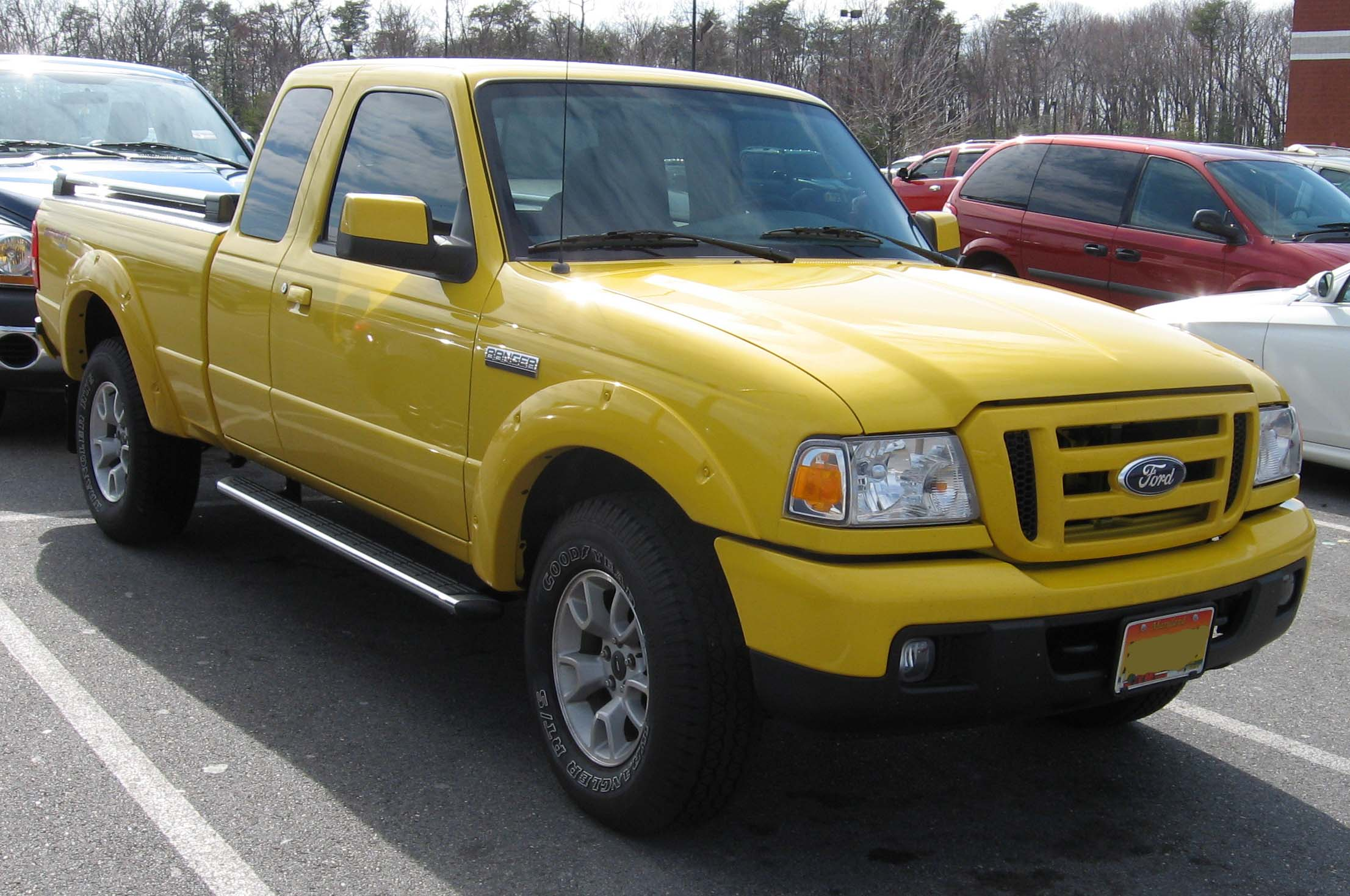
2006–2007 Ford Ranger Sport 4x4 SuperCab

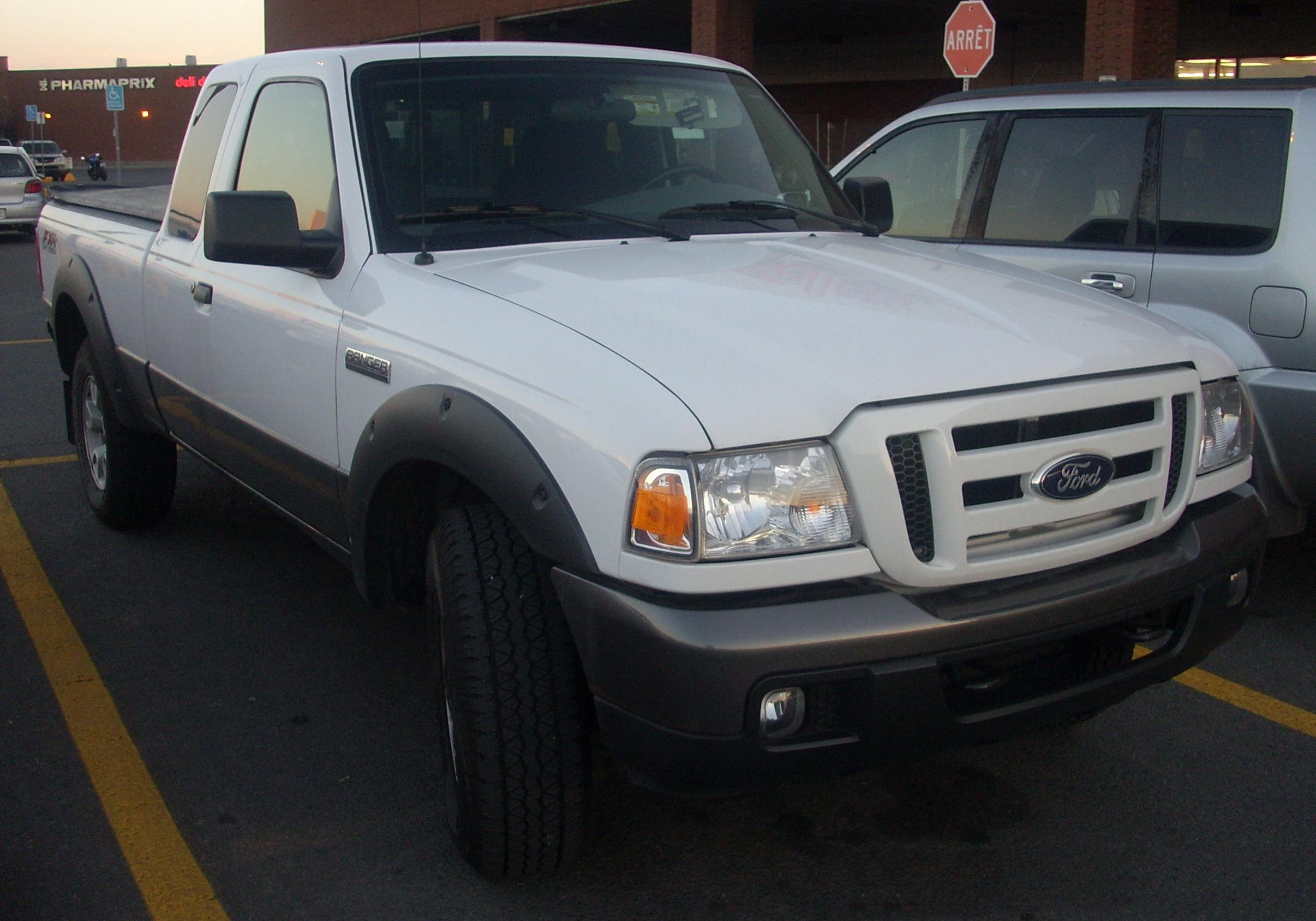
2008 Ford Ranger FX4 SuperCab

=== Trim ===
At its launch, the third-generation Ranger was marketed with the XL and XLT trims; the long-running STX trim level was discontinued and the Splash trim was discontinued after 1998. For further differentiation between the XL and XLT, for 1999, Ford introduced Sport and Off-Road variants of each trim (effectively replacing the Splash and STX, respectively); a low-content XL Fleet model was also offered.

For 2001, the Ranger Edge was introduced, with the FX4 and Tremor following in 2002. For 2005, the Ranger Tremor was deleted and the STX returning; the Ranger Edge effectively became the Ranger Sport for 2006.

Several adjustments were made to the Ranger trims during the late 2000s. After 2007, the STX was discontinued, with 2009 serving as the final year for the FX4 in the United States (though it remained available in Canada for 2010 and 2011 model years). From 2010 onward, the XL, XLT, and Sport were offered; the latter two included Sirius radio as an optional feature, beginning in 2007.

==== Ranger Edge (2001–2005) ====
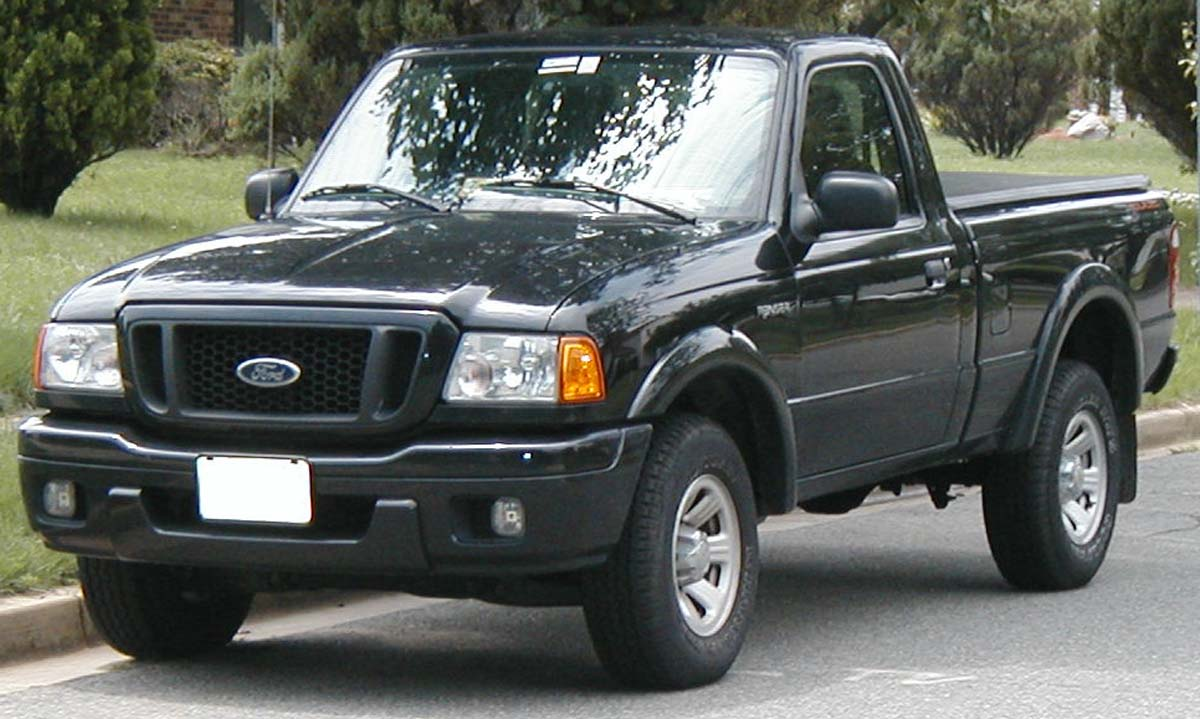
2004–2005 Ford Ranger Edge

For 2000, Ford introduced the XL Trailhead option, offering the suspension and higher ride height of a 4x4 Ranger on a rear-wheel drive vehicle. For 2001, the option became the Edge trim level for the Ranger; slotted between the XL and XLT. Distinguished by a monochromatic exterior, Edge also served as a successor to the 1990s Splash trim. To expand the trim offering, Ford introduced the Edge Plus (combining several XLT features with the Edge), along with a 4x4 variant with the 4.0L V6 (as the Edge already was produced with the front suspension and tires of the 4x4).

Following the 2005 model year, the Ranger Edge was repackaged as the Ranger Sport (as Ford shifted the Edge nameplate to a mid-size CUV); the Sport would be produced through the 2012 model year.

==== Ranger FX4 (2002–2009) ====
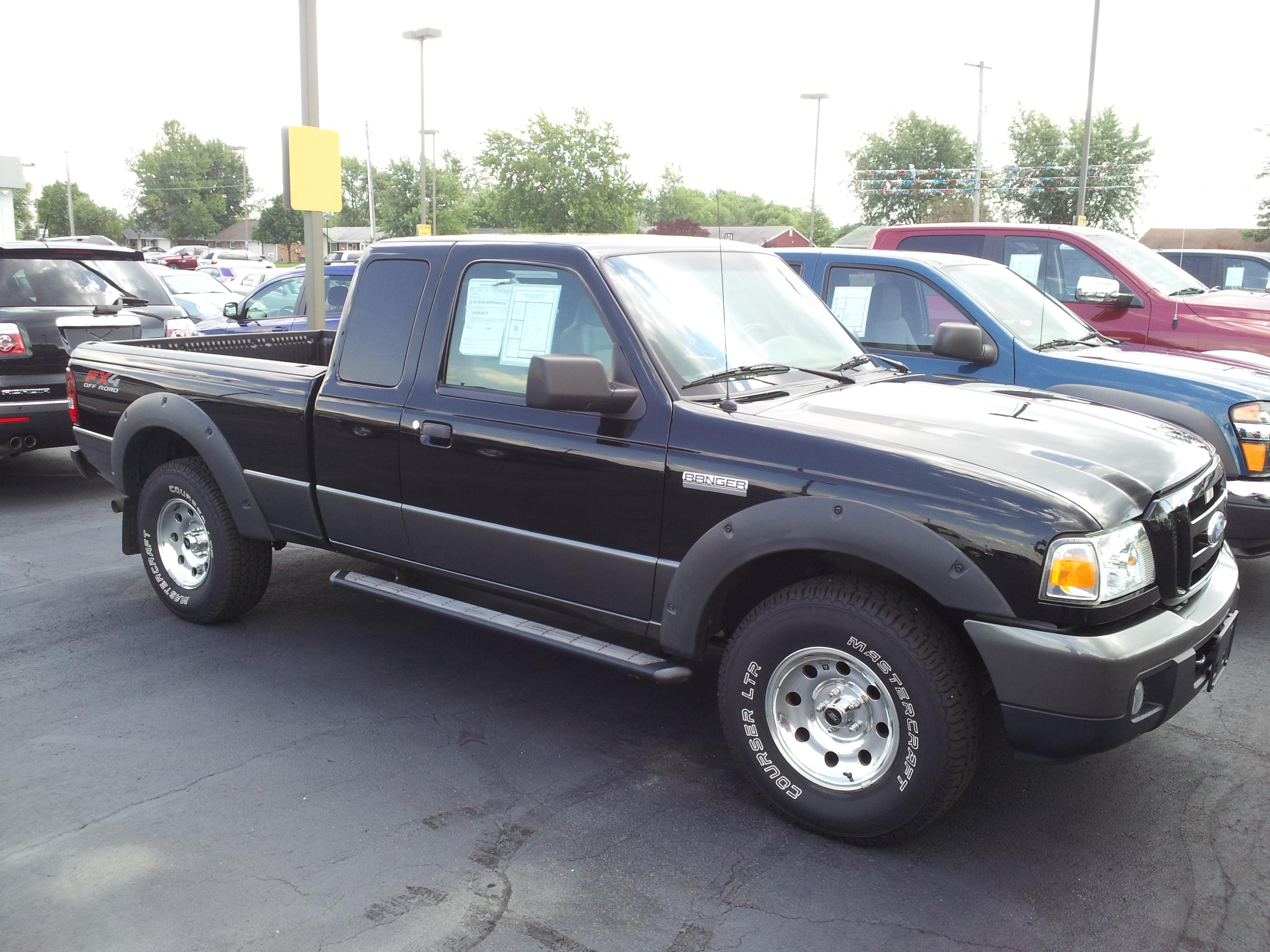

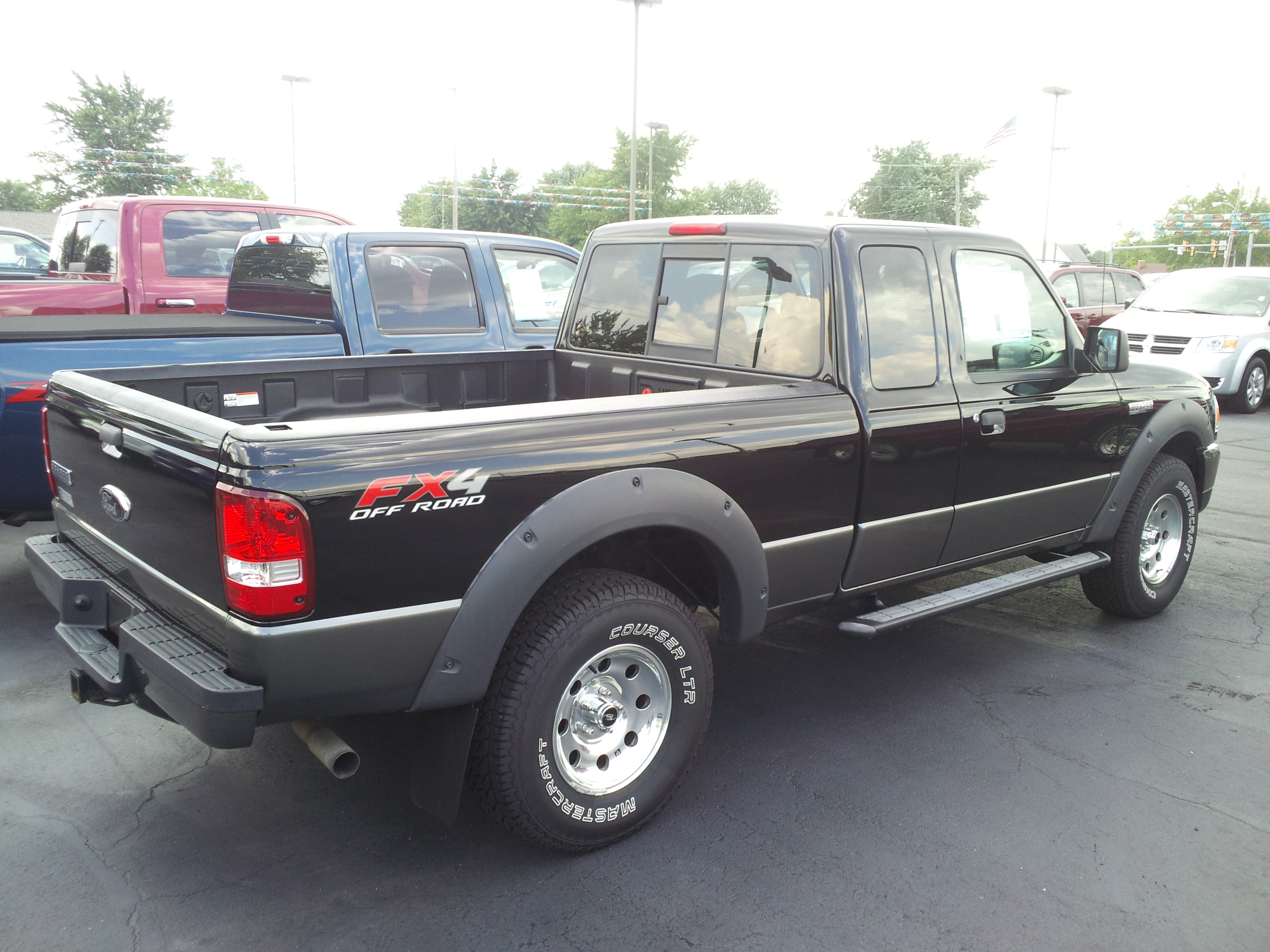
2006 Ford Ranger FX4 Off-Road

From 2002 to 2009. the Ranger FX4 was offered as the flagship of the Ranger model line, produced with heavy-duty off-road components.

Introduced as the Ranger FX4 for 2002, the off-road option package came standard with the 4.0L V6, including a manual transfer case, 31-inch all-terrain tires on 15-inch Alcoa wheels, a Ford 8.8 rear axle with a limited-slip differential and three skid plates. The interior was given two-tone bucket seats (leather seats becoming optional in 2006) with heavy-duty rubber floor mats.

For 2003, the FX4 model line was expanded, as Ford introduced the Ranger FX4 Off-Road; the previous FX4 became the FX4 Level II. Intended as a lower-cost version, the FX4 Off Road does not have the Torsen limited-slip rear axle, Bilstein shocks, or Alcoa wheels on 31-inch tires; instead, the FX4 Off-Road uses off-the-shelf Ford components. To distinguish the two model lines, the FX4 Off-Road was given a chrome grille and front bumper (for 2006, the Off-Road received a body-color grille). While the Level II was never sold with a FlareSide bed option, the configuration was offered on the Off-Road for 2003 and 2004. Likewise, 2003 and 2004 FX4 Off-Road was also available in a regular cab configuration through special order.

For 2008, Ford consolidated the two FX4 model lines, withdrawing the Level II. While retaining the FX4 Off-Road name, the new model line adopted a number of features from the Level II, including three skid plates, a Torsen differential (as an option), heavy-duty shocks (Rancho units replacing Bilsteins), and two-tone bucket seats with heavy-duty rubber flooring. After the 2009 model year, the FX4 was discontinued in the United States (2011 for Canada).

According to Ford, 17,971 Level IIs were built from 2002 through 2007 (including the 2002 FX4); 45,172 FX4 Off Roads were built from 2003 to 2009.

==== Ranger Tremor (2002–2004) ====
For the 2002 model year, the Ranger Tremor was introduced as an option package. In line with the 1990s Ranger Splash, the Tremor was largely an appearance option package, with its content centered around a high-end audio system. Including a 485-watt 4-speaker stereo system, the Tremor included a cassette/CD player, white-gauge instruments, monochromatic exterior, badging, and 16-inch wheels.

For 2003, the Tremor became a stand-alone trim level, lasting through 2004.

=== Safety ===
The Ranger was the first small pickup to introduce dual airbags as safety features. It received an "acceptable" frontal crash test rating from the Insurance Institute for Highway Safety when they were first tested in 1998, while many of its competitors received "marginal" or "poor" ratings at that time. The exception was the Toyota Tacoma, which also got an "acceptable" rating.

The 2007 model year introduced a newly mandated tire pressure monitoring system (TPMS), as well as replacing the airbag key switch with an automatic passenger seat integrated sensor.

The 2010 model year brought the addition of front seat combination head and torso airbags to improve passenger safety in a side-impact collision and earned "good" rating through the Insurance Institute for Highway Safety's side impact test. Also, electronic stability control was added for the 2010 models as standard equipment.

In the Roof Strength Test conducted by Insurance Institute for Highway Safety, the 2010 Ranger earned an Acceptable rating.

== Fourth generation (2019) ==
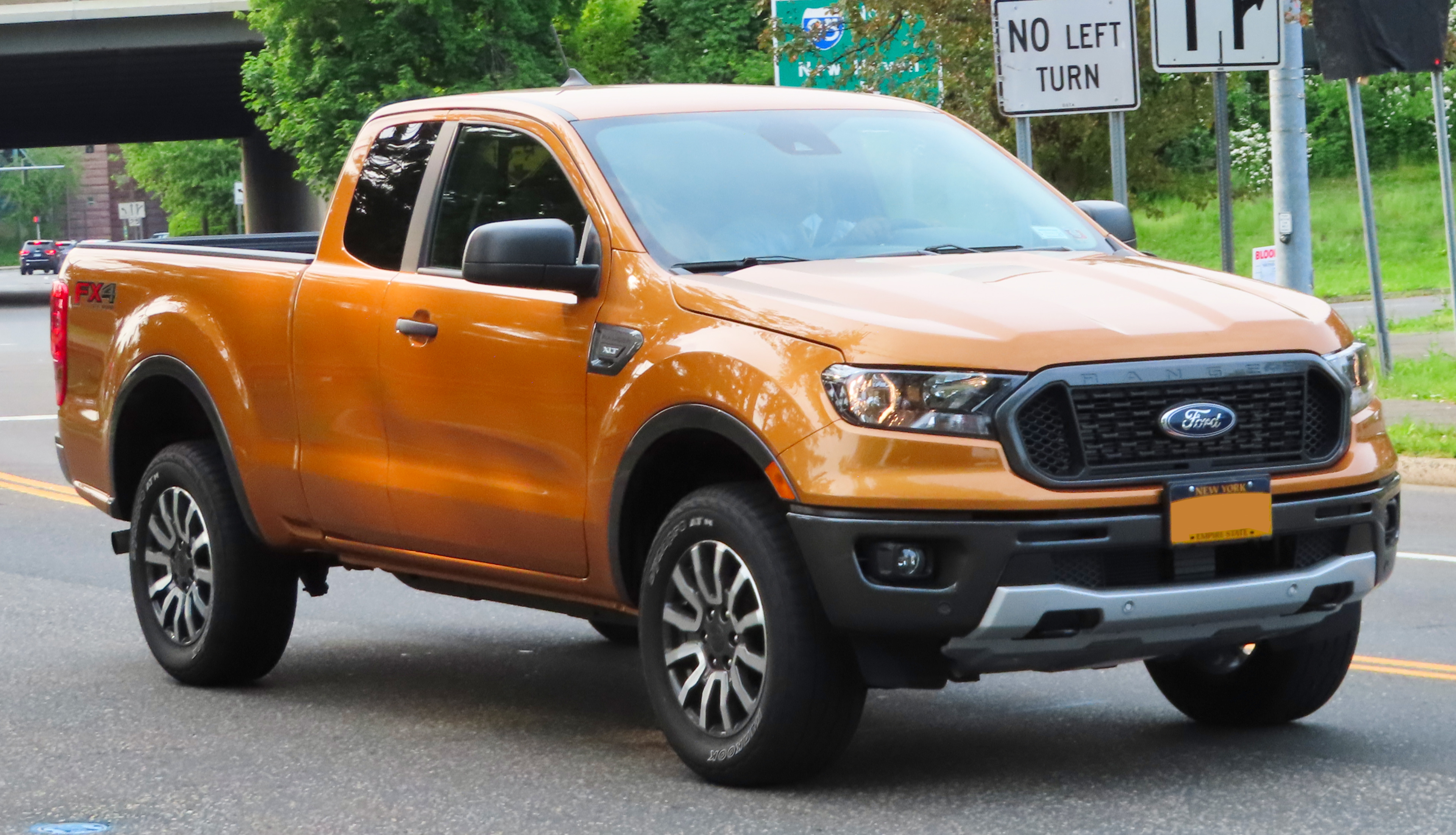
2019 Ford Ranger XLT FX4 SuperCab

Ford had intended to release a new North American Ranger for 2004, codenamed P273, but the project was cancelled.

For the 2019 model year, the fourth-generation Ranger was introduced, going on sale in January 2019. Returning after an eight-year hiatus (2012 production was not marketed for retail sale), the fourth-generation Ranger became the first of the model line produced as a mid-size pickup. Developed from the Ranger T6 designed by Ford Australia, the Ranger underwent several design changes to its frame and bumpers.

Along with its shift in size segments, the fourth generation marks several firsts for the Ranger in North America. The two-door standard-cab configuration is no longer produced; all examples are SuperCabs or SuperCrews. While Ford Argentina produced crew-cab Rangers during the 1990s and 2000s, this is the first Ranger offered with four full doors in the United States and Canada. For the first time, no V6 engine nor any manual transmission is offered; a 2.3-liter turbocharged inline-4 and a 10-speed automatic is the sole powertrain offering (as of 2020 production).

The fourth-generation Ranger is produced by Ford at its Michigan Assembly Plant in Wayne, Michigan.

== Fifth generation (2024) ==
The North American fifth generation of the Ranger debuted on May 10, 2023 (after having gone on sale globally in November 2021) and went on sale later the same year. However, the ongoing global supply chain crisis has delayed the 2024 Ranger's manufacturing start date several times, and the Ranger's production was halted by the 2023 United Auto Workers strike from mid-September to the end of October. The Ranger lineup features a Raptor version for the first time powered by the same 3.0-liter EcoBoost twin-turbocharged gasoline V6 engine from the Explorer ST and Bronco Raptor. The 2.3-liter EcoBoost from the previous generation carries over as the truck's base engine, while the 2.7-liter twin-turbo EcoBoost V6 shared with the Bronco and F-150 is available as an optional engine on the XLT and Lariat trims, producing 315 hp (235 kW; 319 PS); regardless of engine choice, all North American Rangers are mated to the 10R60 10-speed automatic transmission. Unlike the previous generation, the P703 Ranger was engineered for the American market from the beginning of its development. While the North American Ranger is visually similar to its global counterpart, the third brake light is relocated from the tailgate to the top of the cab, and amber side markers are added to the front quarter panels.

== Variants ==
=== Ford Ranger EV (1998–2002) ===
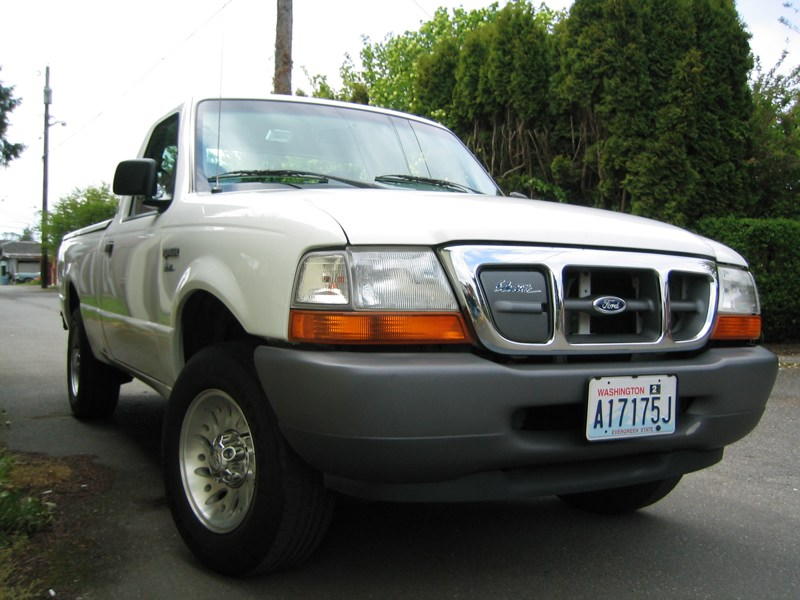
Ford Ranger EV

The first battery electric vehicle produced by Ford in North America, the Ford Ranger EV was produced from 1998 to 2002. Originally fitted with lead-acid batteries, Nickel metal hydride (NiMH) batteries were introduced for 1999. While using the frame of a 4×4 Ranger, the Ranger EV was rear-wheel drive with a rear-mounted driveline. It is also the only rear-wheel drive American-produced Ford fitted with a de Dion rear suspension. Externally, the Ranger EV is primarily distinguished from a standard Ranger by its grille; the Ranger EV has a grille-mounted charging port on the right third of its grille.

During its production, 1,500 Ranger EVs were produced; as with most electric vehicles of the 1990s, it was offered exclusively through lease. While most fleet-leased Ranger EVs were returned to Ford after the end of the lease and dismantled, some Ranger EVs leased by individuals were purchased and may remain in use but there is no available data.

=== Mazda B-Series/Mazda Truck (1994–2010) ===
For 1994, Mazda North America ended imports of the B-series from Japan, entering into an agreement with Ford to market a rebadged version of the Ranger as the B-series in the United States and Canada. For Mazda, whose 1986–1993 B-series had struggled in North America, the new B-series was a variant of one of the highest-selling compact trucks. In addition, selling a truck produced in the United States allowed Mazda to entirely circumvent the 25% "chicken tax".

The Mazda B-Series adopted both cab configurations of the Rangers; all units were produced with Styleside beds (revised in design for the Mazda line). Mechanically identical to the Ranger, the B-Series was offered with the same engines and transmissions; both two-wheel drive and 4×4 versions were offered. In line with previous Mazda pickup trucks, badging was related to engine displacement, with the B2300 sold with the 2.3-liter inline-four, and the B3000 and B4000 receiving the 3.0 and 4.0-liter V6s respectively.

To distinguish the Mazda from the Ranger, stylists gave the B-Series its own front fascia, pickup truck bed, and wheel designs; the extended cab (Cab Plus) received chrome window trim and blacked-out B-pillars. At its launch, the B-Series was offered in SE and LE trim lines (equivalent to Ranger XL and XLT). For 1997, the trim levels were revised, becoming SE-5 and SE-5+; for 1998, the SX and SE were offered, remaining through the rest of the production run.

As the two model lines were nearly identical, the Ford-produced B-Series closely followed the development of the Ranger in its body and chassis. For 1997, Mazda dropped the B3000 (separately from Ford), returning it for 1998. For 1998, the B-series underwent the same body and chassis upgrades as the Ranger. Along with a redesign of the front fascia, Mazda received an all-new pickup truck bed (with vestigial fenders/steps); in a mechanical change, an enlarged standard engine created the B2500. As a running change during the model year, Cab Plus (SuperCab) models received two rear-hinged doors, a first in the pickup truck segment. For 2001, an all-new standard engine replaced the B2500 with the return of the B2300; the B4000 received an overhead-cam engine.

For 2002, Mazda remarketed the model line, relaunching the B-Series in North America as the renamed Mazda Truck. While the Truck name was all-new, all B-Series fender badging denoting engine size remained. Separate from the Ranger, the Mazda Truck received what would be its final exterior update; on a redesigned front fascia, the Mazda badge was centered into the grille. After 2007, the B3000 was discontinued (Ford ended production of the 3.0L Vulcan V6 within a year). As Mazda North America began to shift away from pickup truck sales, the Mazda Truck was withdrawn from the United States after the 2009 model year; leftover production was sold in Canada for 2010.

The final Mazda Truck was produced by Twin Cities Assembly on December 11, 2009, ending 37 years of pickup truck sales by Mazda North America.

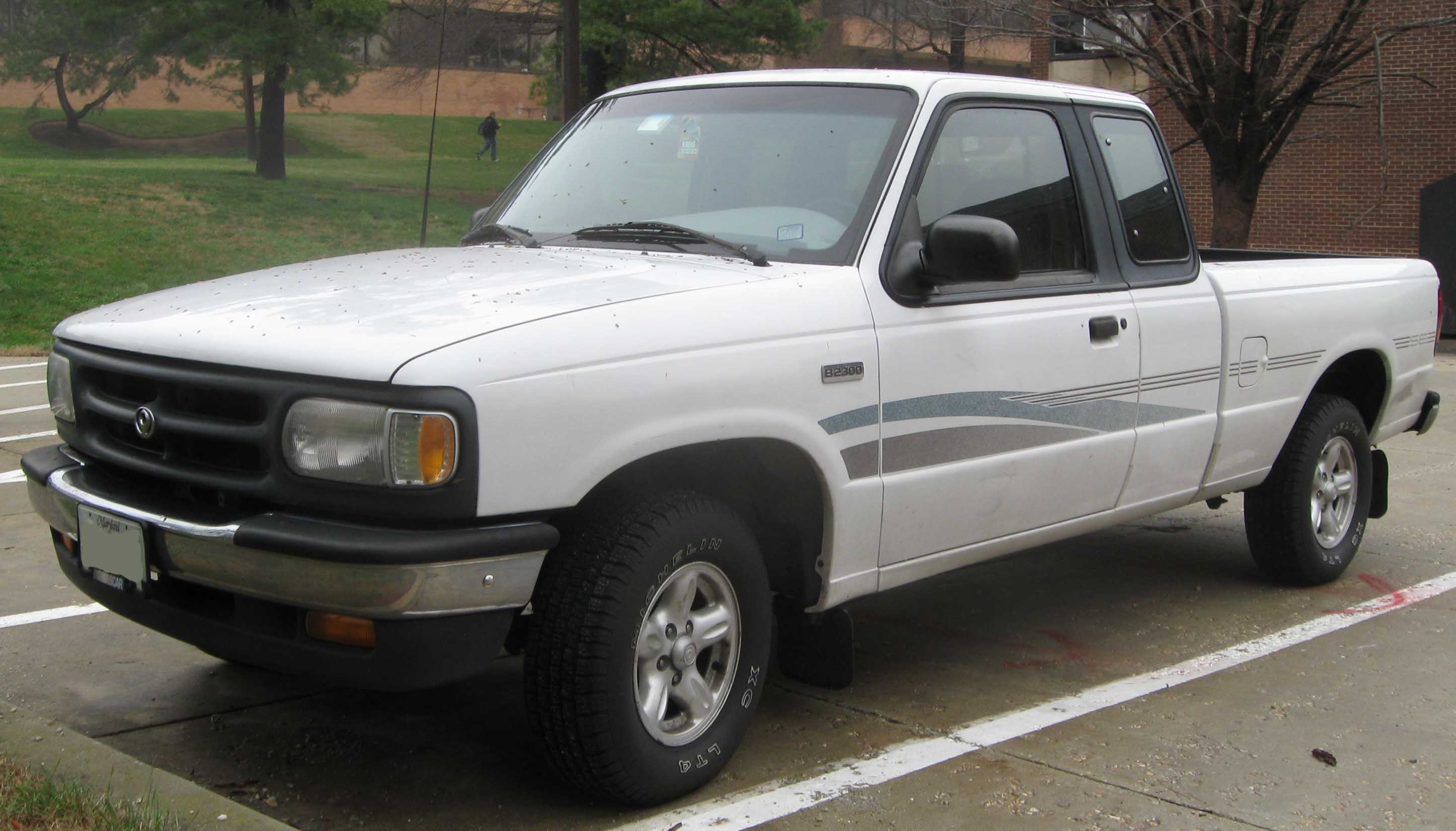
1994–1997 Mazda B2300 SE Cab Plus

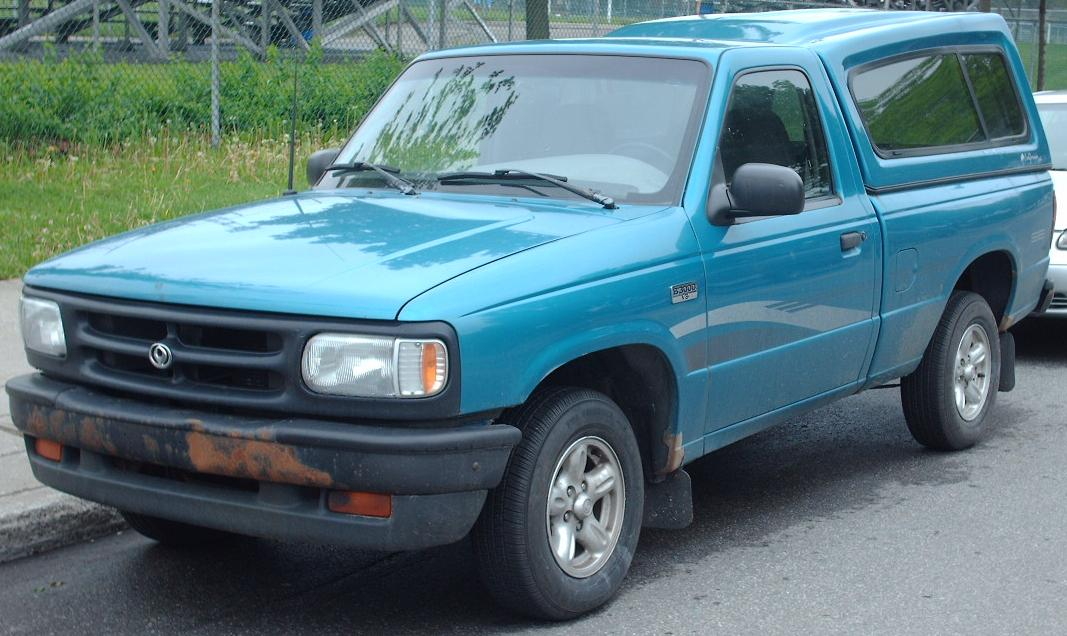
1994–1997 Mazda B3000 SE

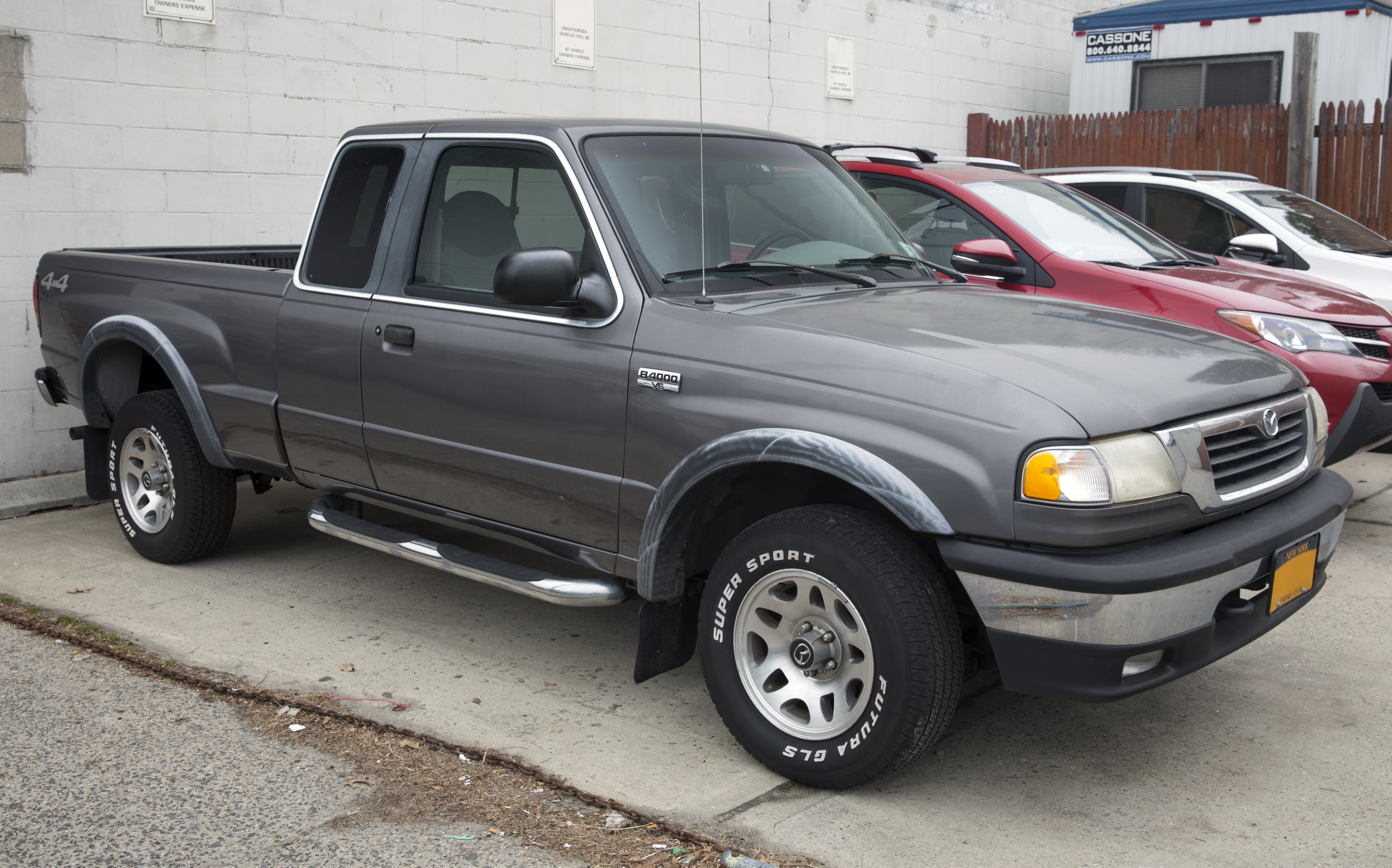
1998–2001 Mazda B4000 Cab Plus (2000)

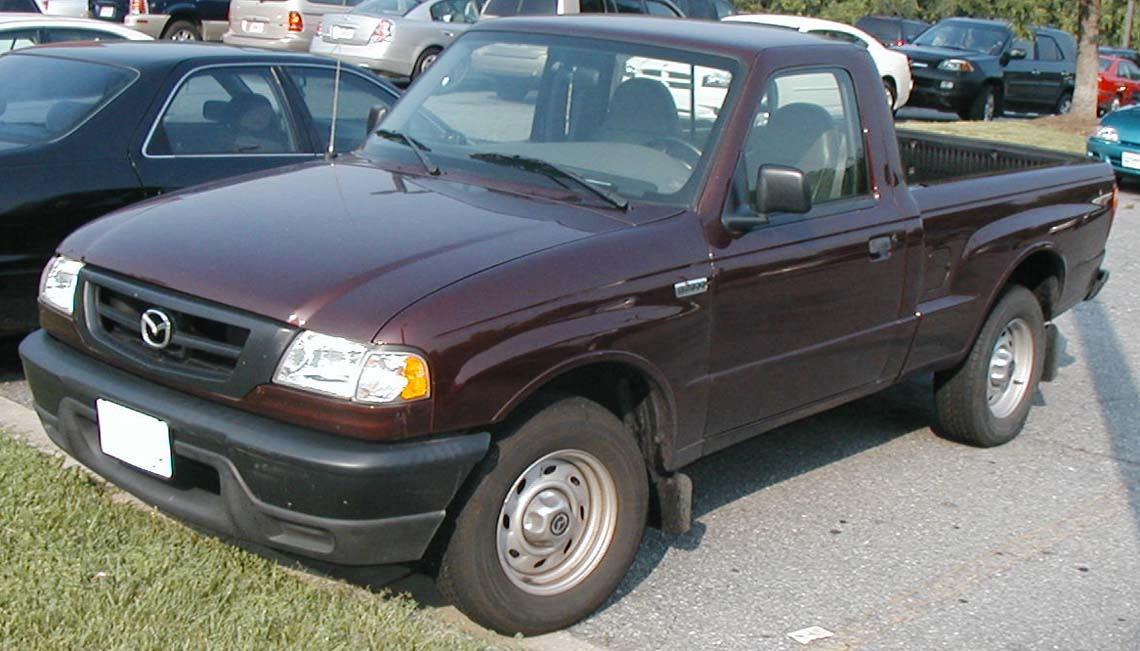
2002–2006 Mazda Truck B2300 SX

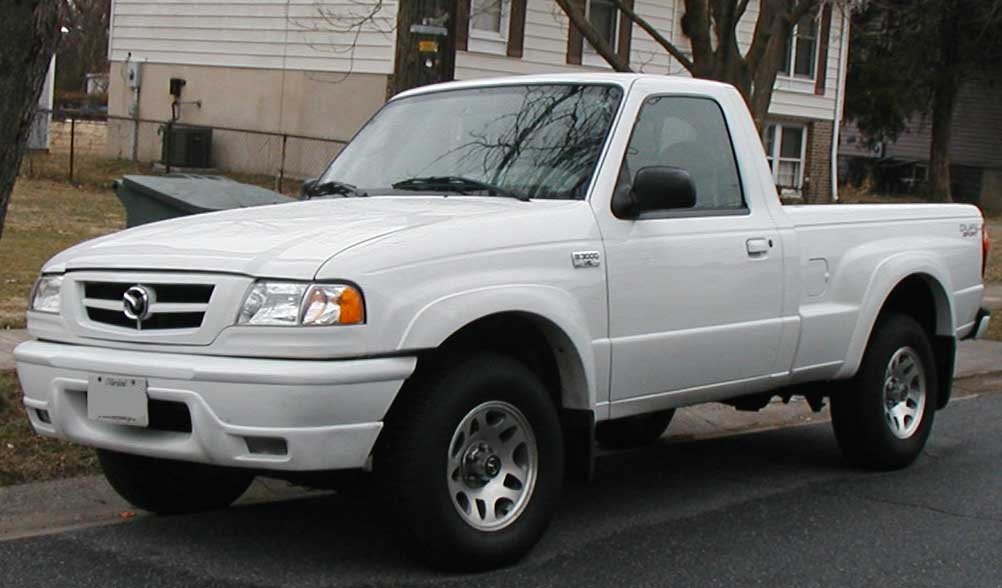
2002–2007 Mazda Truck B3000 4×4 Dual Sport

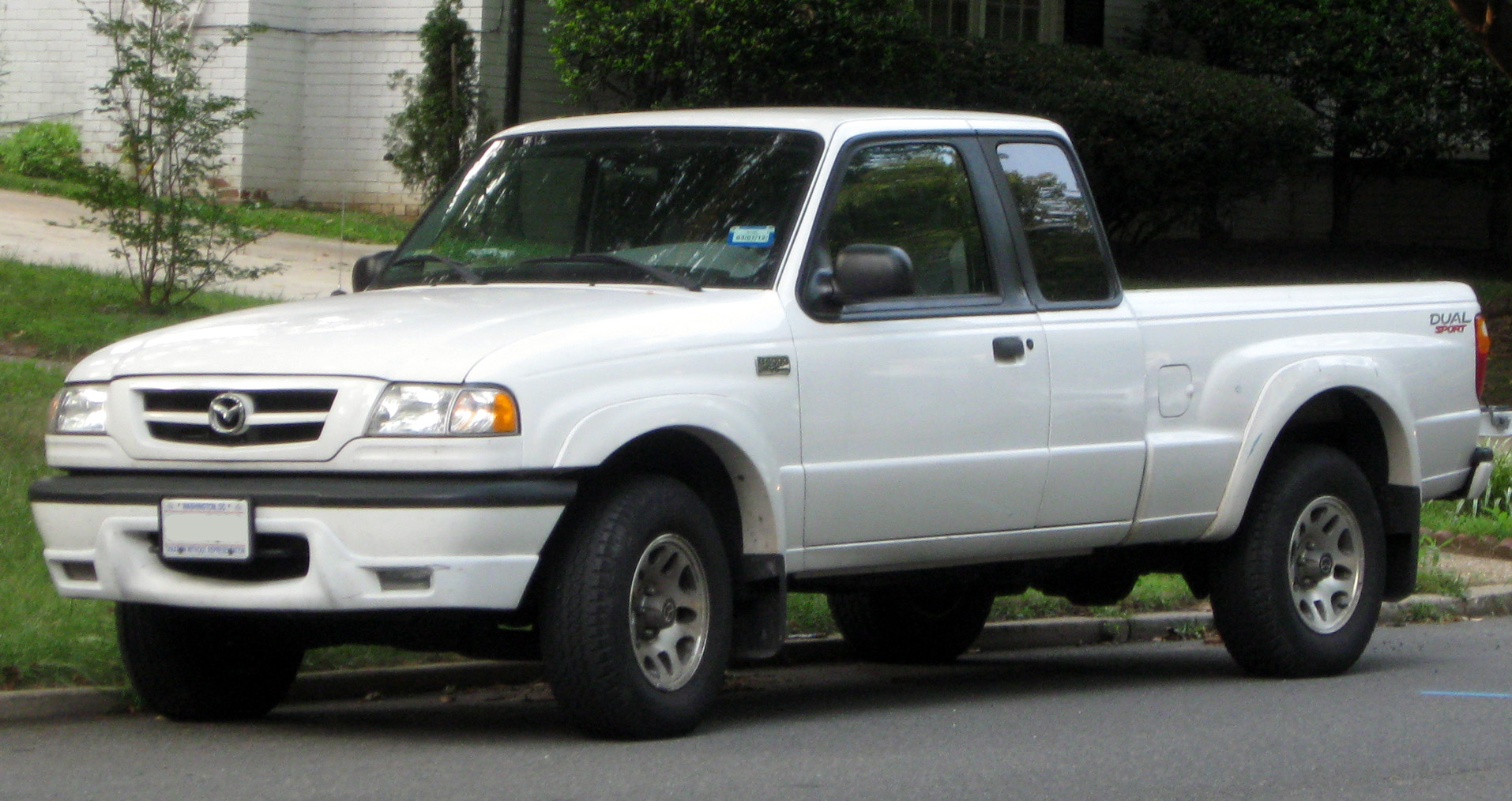
2002–2009 Mazda Truck B4000 4×4 Cab Plus Dual Sport

=== South American production (1996–2011) ===
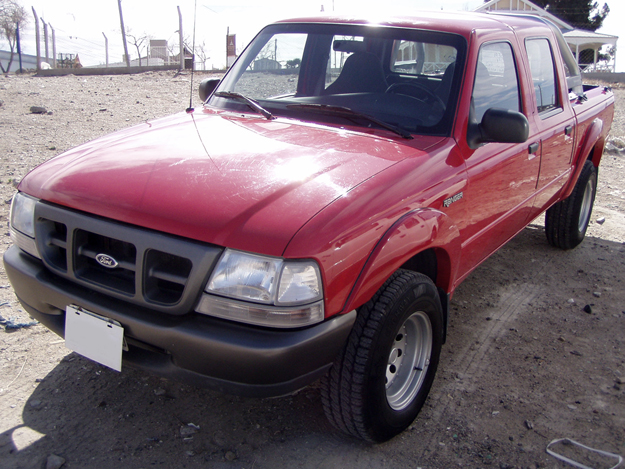
1998–2003 Ford Ranger double cab (South America)

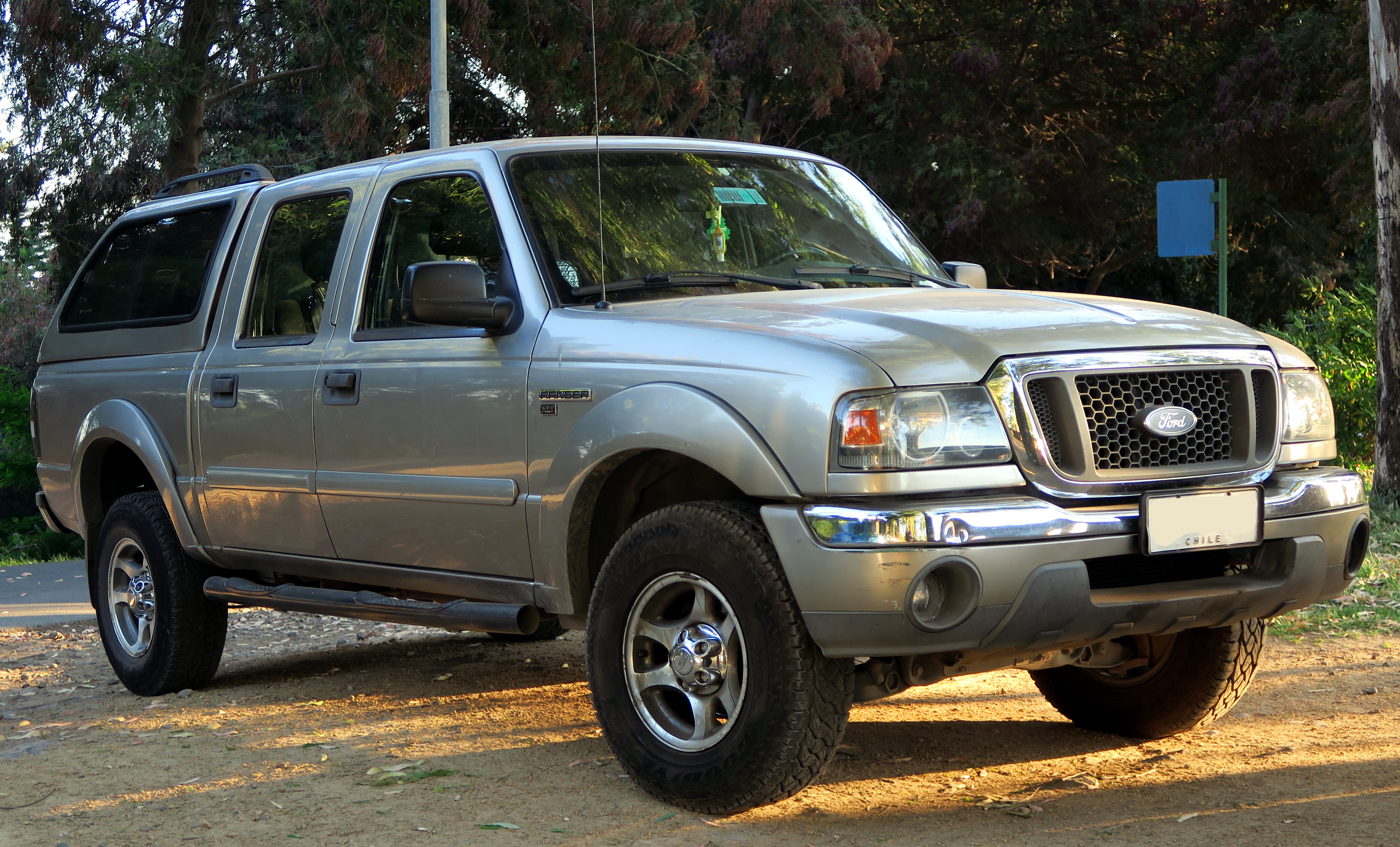
2009 Ford Ranger 2.3 XLT double cab

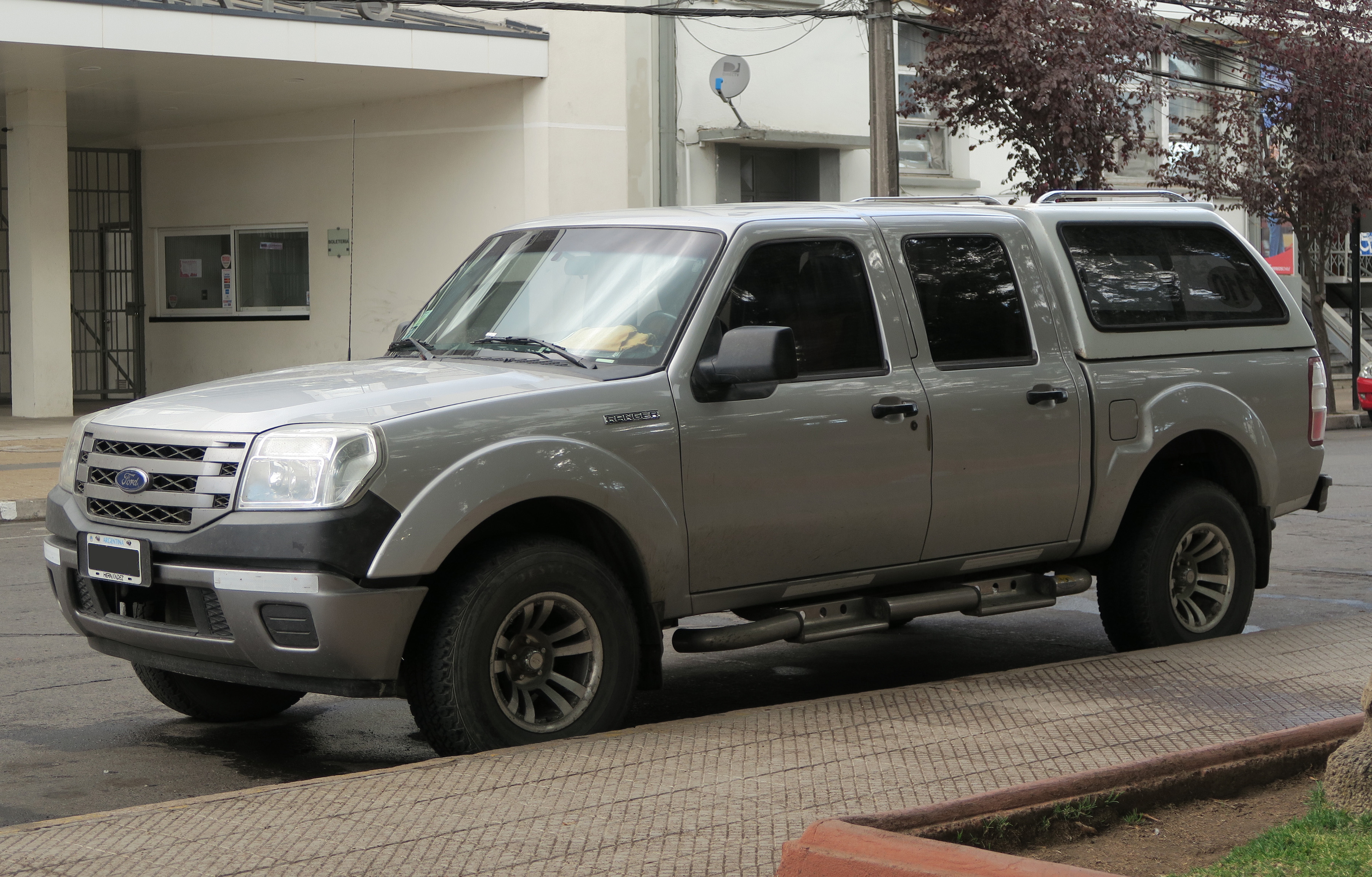
2012 Ford Ranger 2.3 XL double cab

In 1995, Ford began exports of the Ranger from the United States to Argentina; initial exports started with two-door SuperCab equipped with the 4.0-liter gasoline Cologne V6. As demand increased, Ford made the decision to produce it locally in Buenos Aires, Argentina, at the Ford General Pacheco Assembly Plant for the local market and subsequently for the rest of Latin America.

The first Rangers produced at General Pacheco were built in 1996, with Ford offering single cab versions with gasoline engines. By November 1997, supply was increased with both diesel and gasoline engines, two-wheel and four-wheel drive, and different levels of equipment. After two years of local production, Ford of Argentina introduced a redesigned version of the Ranger for 1998. Featuring the same updates as its counterpart in the United States, a new four-door double cab body variant exclusive to South America made its debut. As Ford was developing the functionally similar Ford Explorer Sport Trac at the time, the double-cab Ford Ranger was not produced or marketed in the United States or Canada.

Starting in 1998, Ford began to phase out the Ford Courier name on its Mazda-produced compact pickups sold globally in favor of the Ranger nameplate (though the Courier remained in use in Australia). Consequently, exports of the North American-produced Ranger were primarily limited to South America, including Argentina, Brazil, and Chile. To better match the needs of local buyers, Ford of Argentina offered three different turbodiesel powertrain options, including a 2.5-liter turbocharged four-cylinder diesel with 115 hp (85 kW) starting in 1998, a 2.8-liter with 135 hp (99 kW) starting in 2002 and a 3.0-liter with 163 hp (122 kW) and 280 lb⋅ft (380 N⋅m) of torque mated to an Eaton FSO-2405-A five-speed manual transmission starting in 2004.

The 2001 exterior facelift given to North American Rangers was not carried over to South American versions, with the 1998 front bodywork remaining until the 2003 model year. For 2004, both versions were given the same grille (though Argentine-produced versions were designed with projector-style headlamps). Following a US$156.5 million upgrade to the General Pacheco factory in 2007, several upgrades were made to the South American Ranger; a number of them would diverge the model from its US counterpart. For 2008, the Ranger received a makeover with a grille and headlights similar to the 2006 North American version; bed extenders became available for all boxes.

For 2010, Ford of Argentina gave the Ranger its largest facelift since 1992. Exclusive to South America, the update replaced the hood, front fenders and bumper with a more aggressive design; to allow for a more aggressive stance, large wheel arches were included. For the first time, the Ranger adopted the Ford three-bar corporate grille; the door handles were redesigned, shifting to a loop-style design. The interior was largely unchanged, as were the powertrain offerings. A new option (for Argentina and Brazil) included an engine powered by compressed natural gas, making it the first pickup truck to offer a factory-built natural gas vehicle (NGV) commercially available in those countries.

In 2012, Ford of Argentina replaced the US-derived Ranger with the larger Ranger T6. Designed by Ford of Australia, the Ranger T6 consolidated the Ford- and Mazda-based versions of the Ranger onto a single platform sold globally, introduced to North America for 2019.

Although plans were made to produce and sell the Ranger crew cab version in the United States and Canada, Ford could not get the crew cab models to pass Side Impact crash testing.

Ford Ranger (Argentina) wheelbases and bed lengths:

- 1998–2012 – 111.5 inches (2,831 mm) – 6 ft. bed (1,732mm) Single Cab
- 1998–2012 – 117.6 inches (2,987 mm) – 7 ft. bed (2,129mm) Single Cab
- 1998–2012 – 125.7 inches (3,192 mm) – 5 ft. bed (1,467mm) Double Cab

Engines:

Engine	Years	Power	Torque
2.3 L Duratec HE gasoline I4	2004–present	148 hp (110 kW)	159 lb⋅ft (216 N⋅m)
3.0 L Power Stroke diesel I4	2004–present	163 hp (122 kW)	280 lb⋅ft (380 N⋅m)

== Sales ==
Ford Ranger sales (1985–2012, 2019–)
Calendar year	US sales
1985	247,042
1986	269,490
1987	305,295
1988	298,579
1989	184,125
1990	280,610
1991	233,503
1992	247,777
1993	340,184
1994	344,744
1995	309,085
1996	288,393
1997	298,796
1998	328,136
1999	348,358
2000	330,125
2001	272,460
2002	226,094
2003	209,117
2004	156,322
2005	120,958
2006	92,420
2007	72,711
2008	65,872
2009	55,600
2010	55,364
2011	70,832
2012	19,366
2019	89,571
2020	101,486
2021	94,755
2022	57,005
2023	32,334
2024	46,205
