= Compression =

Compression may refer to:

== Physical science ==
- Compression (physics), size reduction due to forces
- Compression member, a structural element such as a column
- Compressibility, susceptibility to compression
- Gas compression
- Compression ratio, of a combustion engine
- Compression (geology)

== Information science ==
- Bandwidth compression, reducing effort in data transmission
- Data compression, reducing the data required for information
  - Audio compression (data), reducing the data required for audio
  - Compression artifact, defect in data due to compression
  - Image compression, of digital images
  - Video compression
- One-way compression function, a cryptographic primitive

== Medicine ==
- Brain compression, a medical condition
- Compression bandage
- Pressing on the lower abdominal area in an intravenous pyelogram
- Cold compression therapy, for minor injuries

== Other ==
- Amplifier gain compression, due to nonlinearity
- Compression (dance), several techniques
- Compression (functional analysis)
- Compression (phonetics), running syllables together
- Dynamic range compression, reducing audio dynamic range

== See also ==
- Compaction (disambiguation)
- Compress
- Compress (medical)
- Compression garment
- Compressor (disambiguation)
- Decompression (disambiguation)
- Expansion (disambiguation)
