= Compressor (disambiguation) =

A compressor is a mechanical device that increases the pressure of a gas by reducing its volume.

Compressor may also refer to:

- A device that performs Compression (disambiguation)
- Compressor (audio signal processor), for dynamic range compression
- Compressor (software), a video and audio media compression and encoding application

== See also ==
- Compression (disambiguation)
- Compaction (disambiguation)
- Decompression (disambiguation)
- Expansion (disambiguation)
- Kompressor (disambiguation)
- Compressor Hot Springs, a place in California, U.S.
- Supercharger
- Turbocharger
