= Compaction =

Compaction may refer to:

- Soil compaction, for mechanically induced compaction near the ground surface
- Compaction of ceramic powders
- Compaction (geology), part of the process of lithification involving mechanical dewatering of a sediment by progressive loading under several km of geomaterial
- Compaction of wires or wire strands to form a wire rope or wire cable
- Faecal compaction, an extreme form of constipation
- Waste compaction, related to garbage
- Cold compaction, powder compaction at low temperatures
- Data compaction, related to computers
  - Curve-fitting compaction
- Compactor, a device that performs compaction
- Compaction a cellular differentiation process in the early embryo

== See also ==
- Compact (disambiguation)
- Compactification (disambiguation)
- Impaction (disambiguation)
