= Kansan Uutiset =

Weekly newspaper in Finland

- Kansan Uutiset reports the Warsaw Pact invasion of Czechoslovakia in 1968.
- Type: Monthly magazine
- Format: Compact
- Owner(s): Yrjö Sirola Foundation, trade unions
- Publisher: Kansan Uutiset Oy
- Editor: Jussi Virkkunen
- Founded: 1957; 69 years ago
- Political alignment: Left Alliance
- Language: Finnish
- Headquarters: Helsinki
- ISSN: 0357-1521
- Website: www.ku.fi

Kansan Uutiset (Finnish: "People's News") is a Finnish language monthly magazine published in Helsinki, Finland. It is the party organ of the Left Alliance.

== History and profile ==
Kansan Uutiset was founded in 1957 as the joint organ of Communist Party of Finland (SKP) and Finnish People's Democratic League (SKDL), both of which, until then, had had their own papers, Työkansan Sanomat (SKP) and Vapaa Sana (SKDL). During the 1970s and in the first half of the 1980s Kansan Uutiset represented the moderates in these groups whereas Tiedonantaja was the organ of the doctrinaire faction.

Kansan Uutiset served the parties until their dissolution in 1990. The paper had close ties to the new Left Alliance, which was founded in 1990, but it did not declare itself the organ until 2000. In the 1990s Kansan Uutiset called itself an "independent left paper".

Kansan Uutiset has its headquarters in Helsinki. Until 1990 the paper was owned by the organisations publishing it. SKP and SKDL also directed the paper through its council and board. New arrangements were made after the parties were gone. A joint stock company was founded, and the new owners were, for example, left-wing trade unions, banks and foundations. The Left Alliance did not directly own any stocks. Nowadays, Yrjö Sirola Foundation has majority of the stocks.

In 2007, the editor-in-chief Janne Mäkinen was convicted of an editorial misdemeanor (Finnish: päätoimittajarikkomus), after the newspaper published an opinion piece about the Israeli–Palestinian conflict claiming that the Holocaust was an "acceptable and desirable measure".

The paper was published four days a week until September 2009, when it became a weekly. KU became a monthly magazine in March 2022. The KU website, however, is updated every day.

The circulation of Kansan Uutiset was 43,800 copies in 1974. The paper sold 9,749 copies in 2002.

== Editors ==
- Jarno Pennanen (1957)
- Jorma Simpura (1957–1974)
- Erkki Kauppila (1974–1988)
- Yrjö Rautio (1988–2004)
- Janne Mäkinen (2004–2008)
- Jouko Joentausta (2008–2014)
- Sirpa Puhakka (2015–2021)
- Jussi Virkkunen (2021–)
