= Kompressor =

Kompressor or KOMPRESSOR (German for 'compressor') may refer to:

- Kompressor (musician), a parody industrial hip hop act (2000–2005)
- Kompressor (Mercedes-Benz), a supercharger option on cars
- Kleemann Kompressor, an aftermarket automotive accessory, an integrated supercharger-intercooler-intake manifold, built by Kleemann
- Der Kompressor (book), a 1983 automotive book by Michael Wolff Metternich

== See also ==
- Turbocharger (turbine-powered supercharger, turbosupercharger), an exhaust-driven engine air compressor, forced air induction
- Supercharger, a power-driven engine air compressor, forced air induction
- Compressor (disambiguation)
