= Joint centration =

Optimum joint positioning and alignment

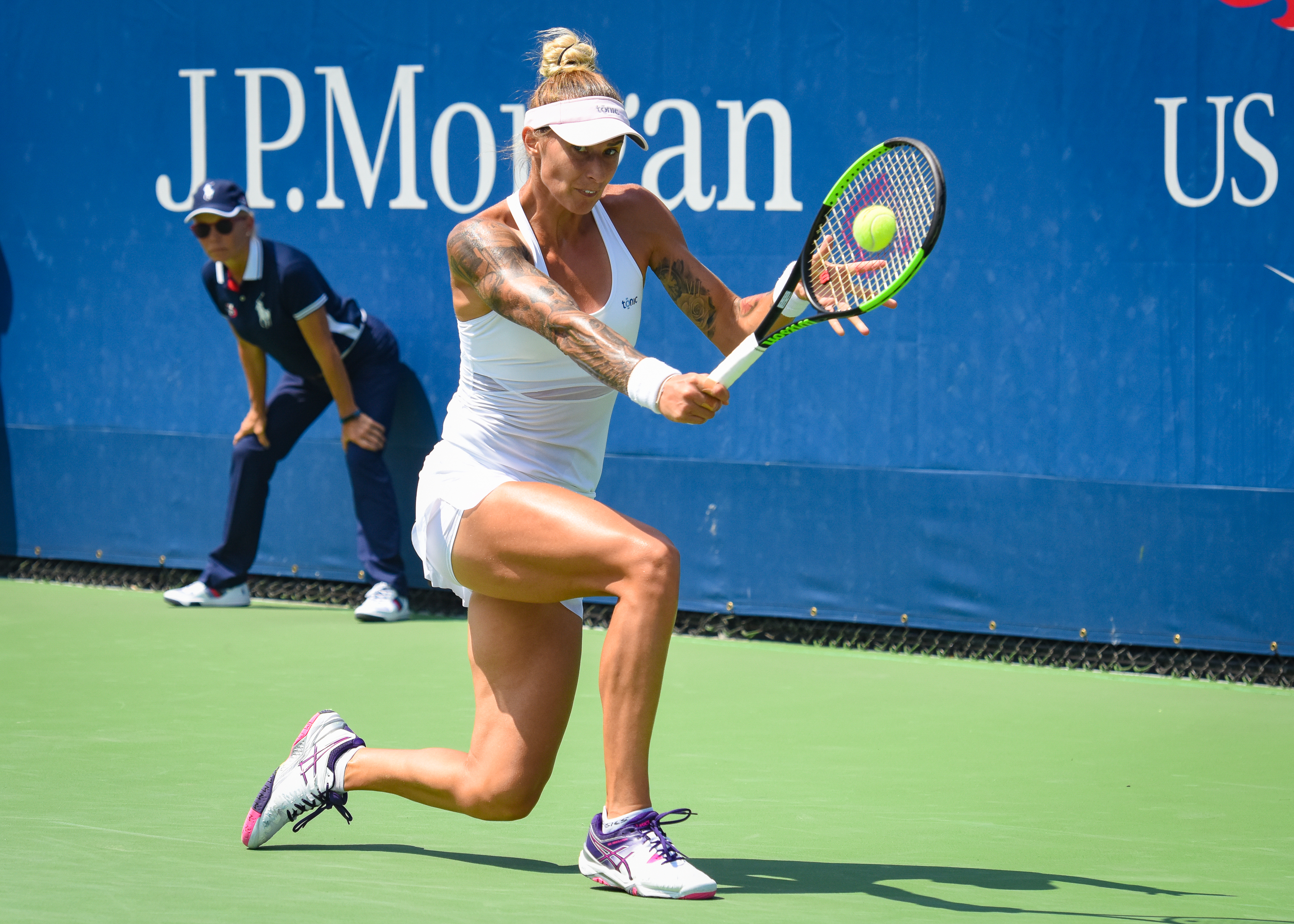
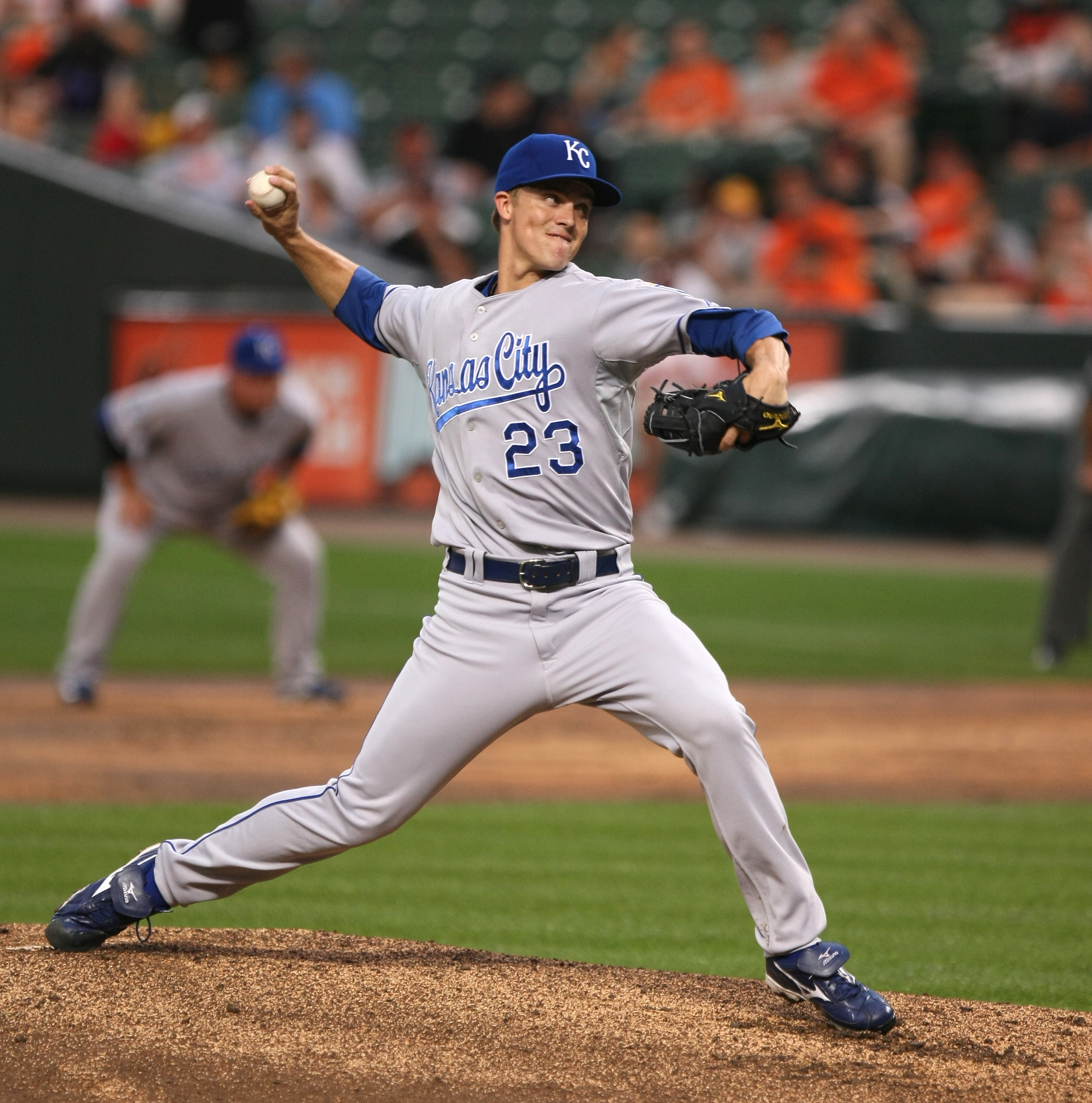
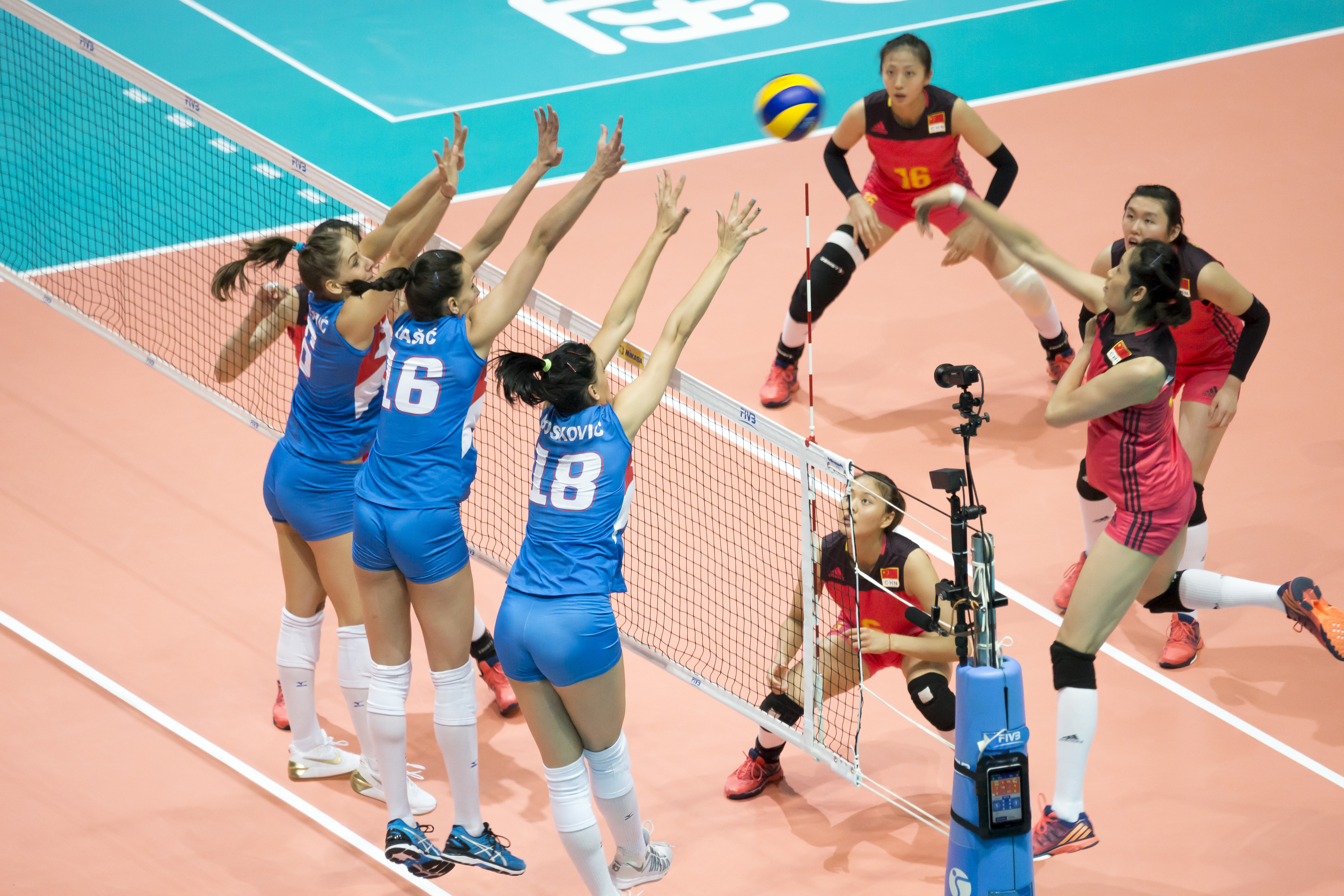
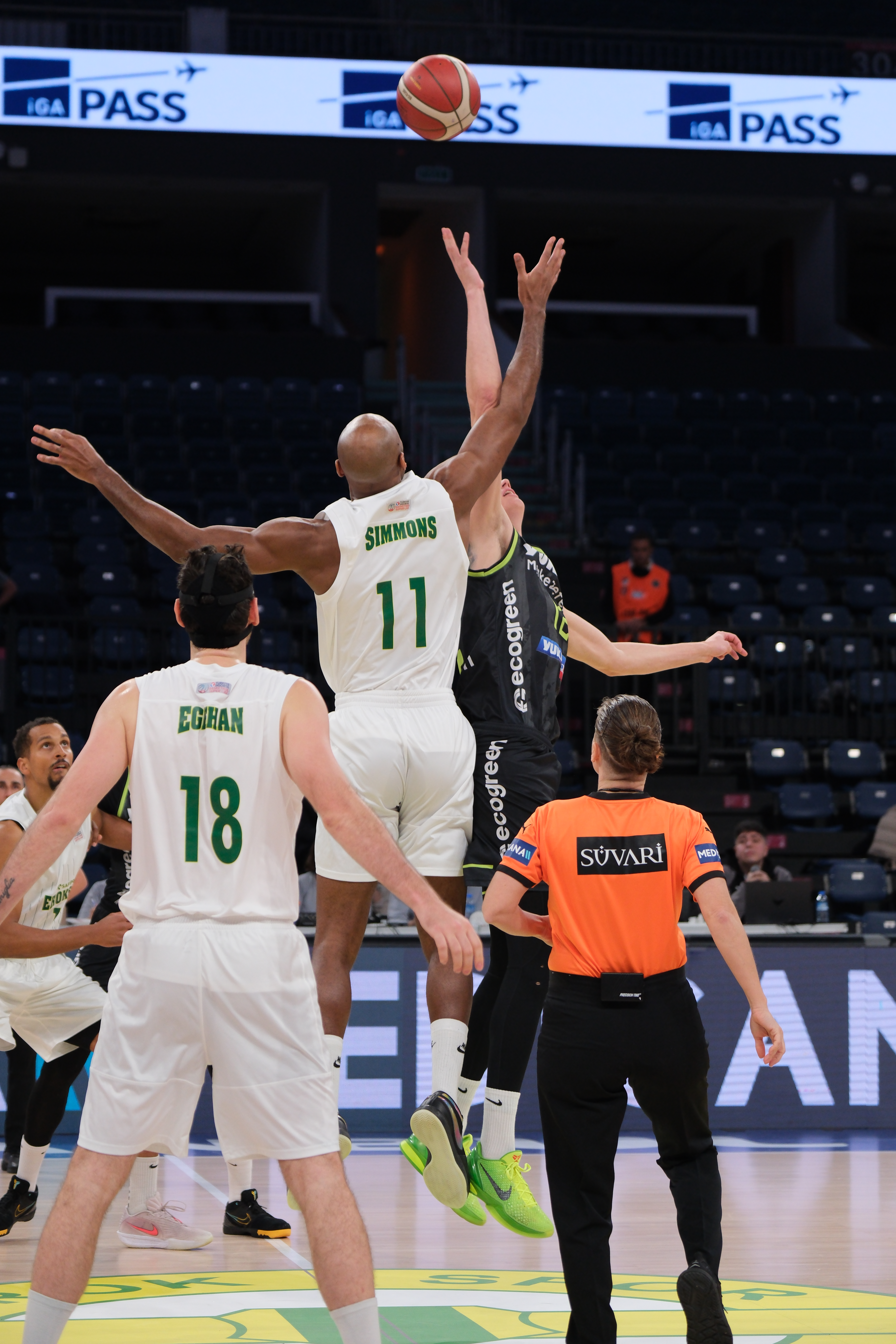
Many sports utilise a knowledge of joint centration in order to ensure optimum athletic performace. For example: baseball, basketball, volleyball and tennis.

Joint centration refers to the positioning and alignment of the body’s joints. A centrated joint is typically considered to be in a centred or neutral position both when static and throughout a range of movement. How the parts of the joint connect and what contact there is between the corresponding surfaces is of fundamental importance. Centration is considered in a positive sense meaning that a centrated joint is positioned and aligned in a manner that is superior to a joint which is decentrated. For example, if the top of the upper arm (humerus) is positioned and aligned within the shoulder socket (glenoid fossa) in a centrated way, then this ensures the best biomechanical advantage both in static positions and during movement. This is also known as glenohumeral stabilisation. A shoulder which is more centrated means that the humerus is positioned and aligned within the glenoid fossa so that their respective surfaces are in contact with each other in a more efficient manner thereby increasing the overall level of functionality. Joint centration also reduces negative friction and pressure within the joint, enhances the potential for biomechanical leverage, improves motor control and reduces injury risk.

The study of joint centration is important in biomechanics, physiotherapy, sports science, kinesiology, sport and fitness training programmes.

== Centration and decentration ==
Centration refers to the optimum positioning, alignment and corresponding control of one or more of the body's joints. This includes while maintaining static postures and performing dynamic movements. When a joint is centrated it means that there is optimal contact (congruency) between the articular surfaces of the joint. For example, the femur head is in optimal contact with the hip socket (acetabulum). This positioning and alignment means that forces are distributed more evenly and negative friction and pressure, whereby the joint surfaces are exposed to excessive shear forces or compression in particular areas, is reduced. As such, it allows for greater muscular activation and generation of correspondent biomechanical force with a reduced risk of injury especially in regard to that caused by wear and tear. According to Clare Frank et al.:

Joint centration or neutral joint position occurs when joint surface congruency and muscles that support the joint are at their optimal mechanical advantage throughout the range of motion and thus are able to produce varying forces according to the required skill. The centrated joint allows for optimal load transference of muscular forces across the joint and along the kinetic chain, with minimal mechanical stress on the passive structures such as ligaments, capsule, cartilage, and joint surfaces.

Decentration refers to when one or more of the joints are less than optimally positioned and aligned. This means that there is less postural control, movement is less efficient and injury is more likely. It does not mean that they are injured although wear and tear injuries become more likely in joints that are decentrated. However, a partially dislocated (subluxated) or a fully dislocated joint will always be decentrated as a result. A single decentrated joint has an effect on the centration on all the other joints of the body. Whether a person's joints are centrated or decentrated is reflected in their posture and the movement patterns which they produce.

The joints of the body can become centrated or decentrated based upon the strength, or weakness, of the surrounding musculature including both agonist and antagonist muscles.

== Use in sport and fitness training programmes ==
A knowledge of joint centration is utilised in the training programmes of numerous sports and fitness disciplines including baseball, basketball, yoga, pilates, body building and sculpting, strength training, and powerlifting. This is to ensure that joint position and alignment is optimised in order to enhance performance and prevent injury. This can mean ensuring that the development of muscular strength is achieved in such a way that centration is maximised and decentration avoided. In a reciprocal manner, the centrated joints then allow for greater levels of muscular efficiency.

== Functional joint centration ==
Functional joint centration relates to the positioning and alignment of the joints as part of an overall system in order to perform an action efficiently. It is a standard part of movement and locomotion and is typically included as a part of kinematic analysis. Functional joint centration means that based upon the systematic positioning and aligning of the joints, that in an 'exercise position' there will be 'ideal biomechanical loading with maximum congruence of articular surfaces’.' This means that a dynamic movement or static hold is made as efficient as possible and allows for increased force application and levels of control.

The knowledge of functional joint centration is utilised in disciplines such as powerlifting, yoga, pilates and numerous other sports and fitness disciplines in order to better understand the most effective movement patterns, to achieve optimal performance, and to prevent and rehabilitate injury. For example, in powerlifting the joints are aligned in a manner to bear more load and move it more powerfully. This can be seen in the heavy back squat exercise where a lifter positions their rib cage over their pelvis. In conjunction with this their diaphragm becomes aligned over their pelvic floor muscles in such a way that the generation of intra-abdominal pressure is maximised. The functional effect of this joint alignment, colloquially known as joint stacking, is that more weight can be lifted with greater levels of safety. In regard to weight training in general, Dr. Craig Liebenson states:

The weight lifter can serve for illustration. He puts himself into a position in which the spinal column, the hip joints, the knees etc. are loaded most favorably. His joints are centered during all the stages of weight lifting to bear the maximum load.'

Another example is in yoga whereby a practitioner will position themselves in a way that aligns their joints so that they can bear their own bodyweight, in a particular pose, for longer and with greater levels of control. Conversely, critics of this method argue that it can lead to an over reliance on skeletal strength while reducing levels of muscular activation. Whereby a person's ability to functionally centrate their joints is enhanced so too is their athletic ability in regard to postural control and movement.

== See also ==
- Joint
- Musculoskeletal
- Biomechanics
- Physiotherapy
- Sport
