= Compactification =

Compactification may refer to:

- Compactification (mathematics), making a topological space compact
- Compactification (physics), the "curling up" of extra dimensions in string theory

== See also ==
- Compaction (disambiguation)
