= Curve-fitting compaction =

Curve-fitting compaction is data compaction accomplished by replacing data to be stored or transmitted with an analytical expression.

Examples of curve-fitting compaction consisting of discretization and then interpolation are:

- Breaking of a continuous curve into a series of straight line segments and specifying the slope, intercept, and range for each segment
- Using a mathematical expression, such as a polynomial or a trigonometric function, and a single point on the corresponding curve instead of storing or transmitting the entire graphic curve or a series of points on it.

== See also ==
- Multivariate adaptive regression splines
