= Ford Ranger =

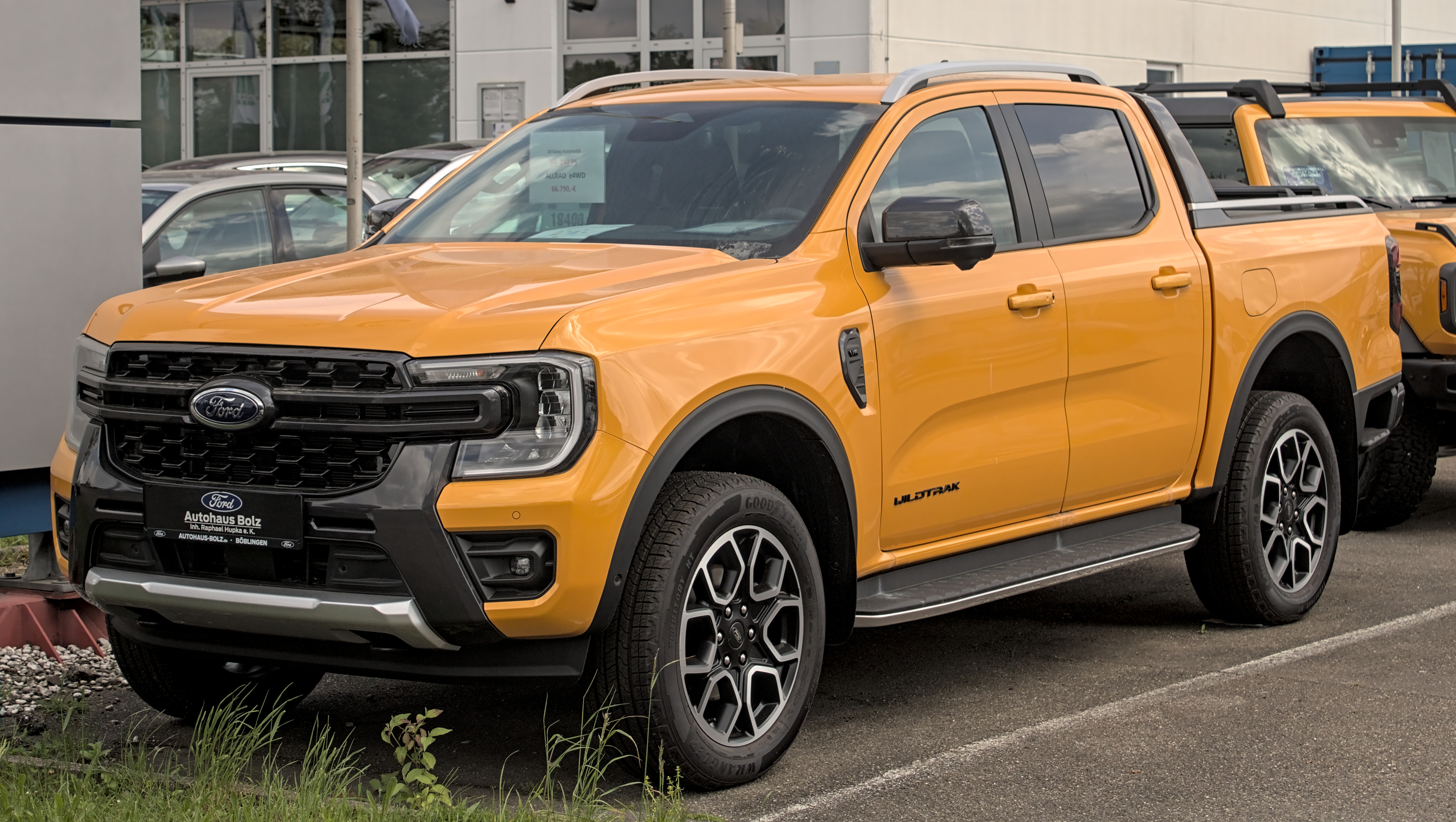
Ford Ranger (P703), produced since 2022 based on the T6 platform.

The Ford Ranger is a compact or mid-size pickup truck marketed globally by Ford over a series of generations, varying between both in-house or outside development and manufacturing — and with a hiatus in North America from 2011–2018.

Debuting as a compact pickup in North America in 1982 for the 1983 model year, the Ranger was later introduced in some South American countries. From 1998 to 2011, the Ranger nameplate was used for models developed by Mazda for sale outside the North American market. In 2011, Ford introduced the first Ranger based on the T6 platform. Considered a mid-size pickup truck, the model was developed in-house by Ford Australia. In that same year, the North American-market Ranger was discontinued, leaving the T6 platform-based Ranger as the sole Ranger model worldwide.

For the 2019 model year, the Ranger was reintroduced in North America using the globally-marketed T6 model. It is manufactured at the Michigan Assembly Plant at Wayne, Michigan. The Ranger is smaller than the F-150 and larger than the Maverick in the Ford North American pickup truck range, while for markets outside the Americas it is typically the only Ford pickup offered for sale.

The second generation of the T6-based Ranger was released in 2021 for worldwide markets, using a revised T6 platform.

== Origin of name ==
Prior to its use on compact pickup trucks, Ford used the Ranger nameplate on three different model lines. The Edsel division was the first to use the name, with the Edsel Ranger introduced in 1958 as its lowest-trim sedan; the model line lasted through the 1960 demise of the Edsel brand.

For 1965, the Ranger name returned to use by Ford as a trim package for F-Series trucks; in 1972, a corresponding Bronco Ranger was introduced. Offered through the 1981 model year, the Ranger trim served as the mid-level to high-level trim package.

Following the 1981 model year, the Ranger trim line was withdrawn from its light trucks, largely in anticipation of its 1983 model year compact pickup truck which was introduced in early 1982.

== Americas ==
=== North America ===
==== Compact pickup (1983–2012) ====
For the 1983 model year, Ford introduced the Ranger for the United States and Canada. The first compact pickup truck designed by Ford, the American-produced Ranger replaced the Mazda-produced Ford Courier. Produced across three generations using a single chassis architecture, the model line was marketed from the 1983 to the 2012 model years (ending retail sales after the 2011 model year).

The Ranger light-truck chassis architecture served as the basis for a wide range of vehicles over its production. Along with sharing body and powertrain components with the Ford Bronco II and Ford Explorer SUVs, the Ranger also shared components with the Ford Aerostar minivan and the Ford Explorer Sport Trac mid-size pickup truck. Through the use of rebadging, from 1994 to 2009, Mazda marketed the Ford Ranger in the United States and Canada as the Mazda B-Series (the reverse of the 1970s Ford Courier and also the reverse of the Ford Ranger outside of North America).

While among the highest-selling vehicles in the compact segment for nearly its entire 29-year production, an overall decline in demand for compact trucks led to its discontinuation after the 2011 model year (a short 2012 run was produced for fleet sales). On December 22, 2011, the final Ford Ranger produced for North America was assembled at the Twin Cities Assembly Plant, the final vehicle assembled at the facility.

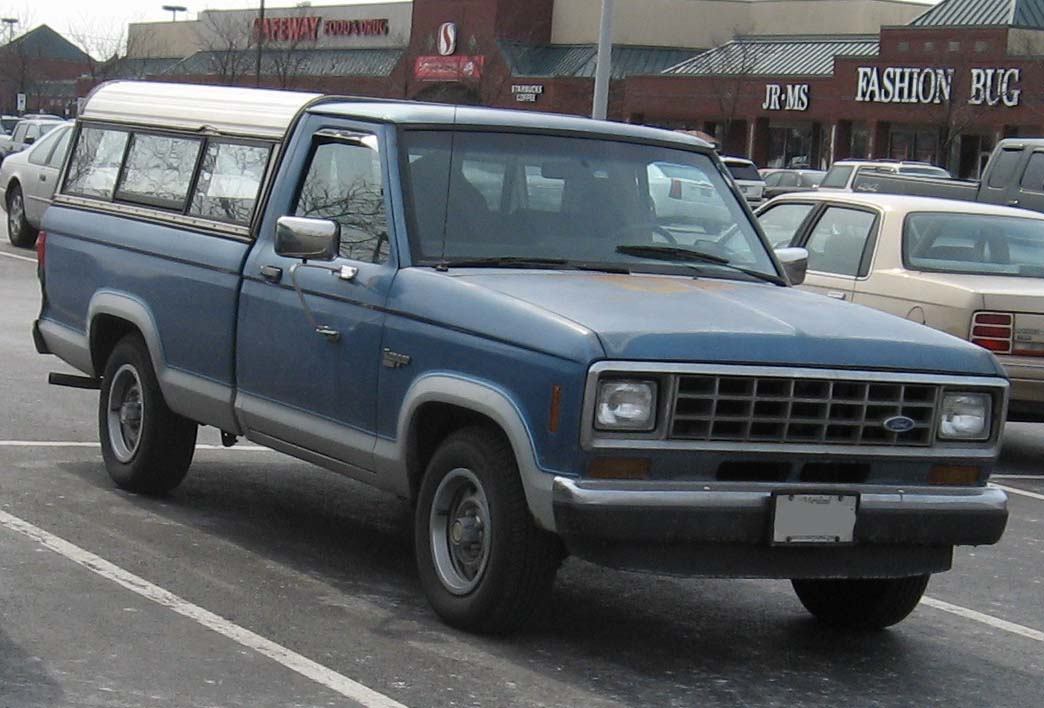
First generation (1983–1988)

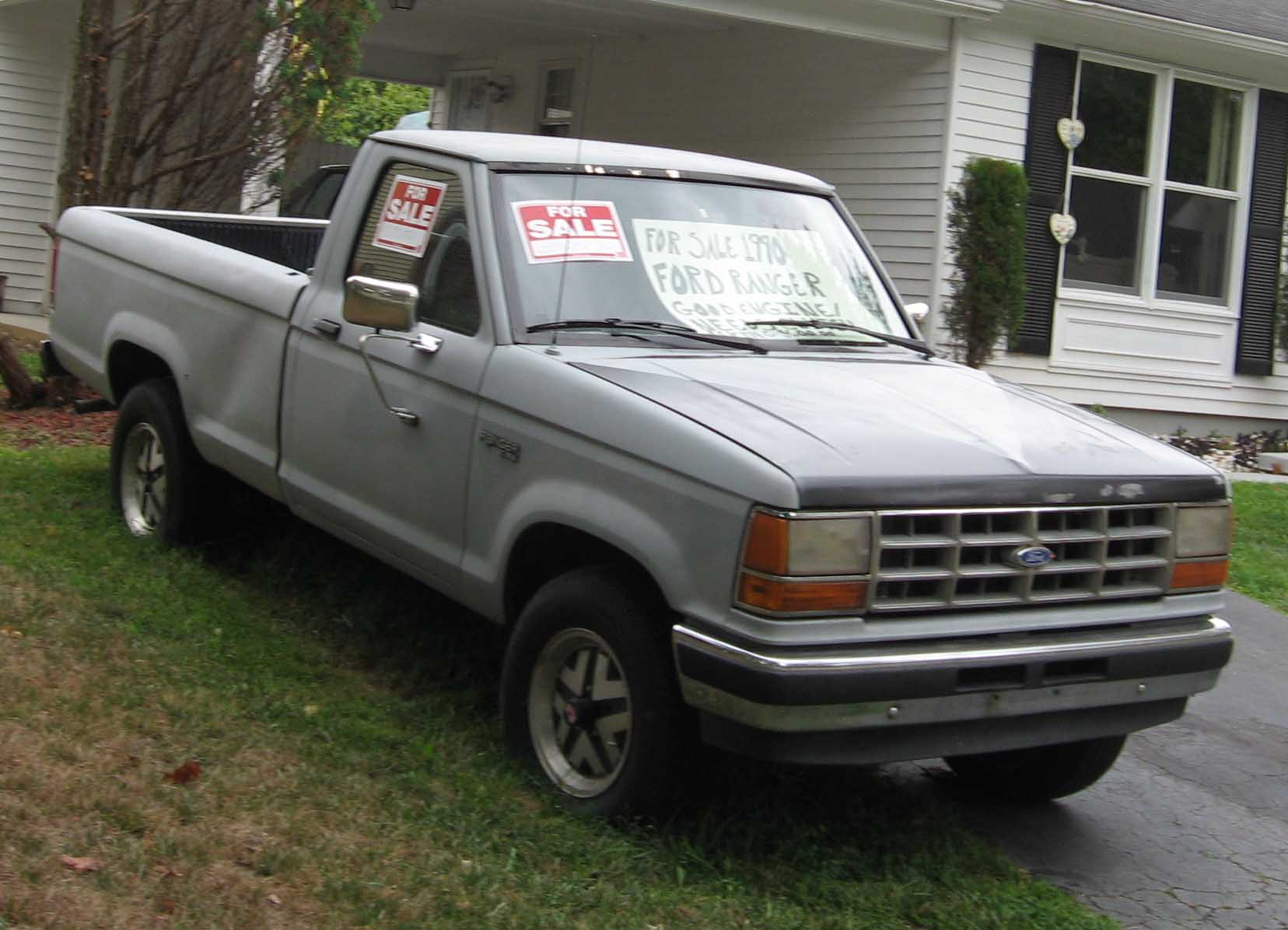
First generation facelift (1989–1992)

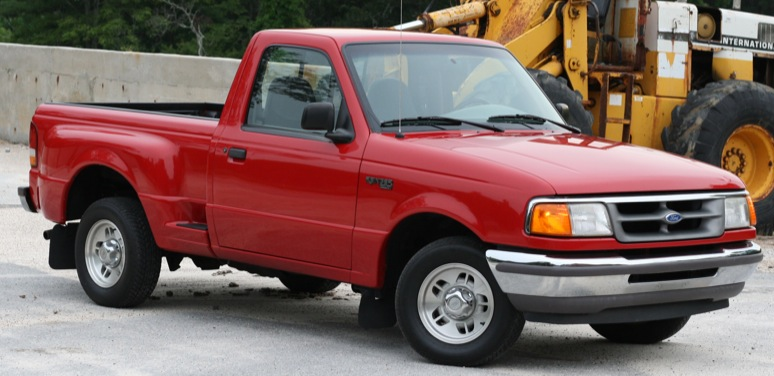
Second generation (1993–1997)

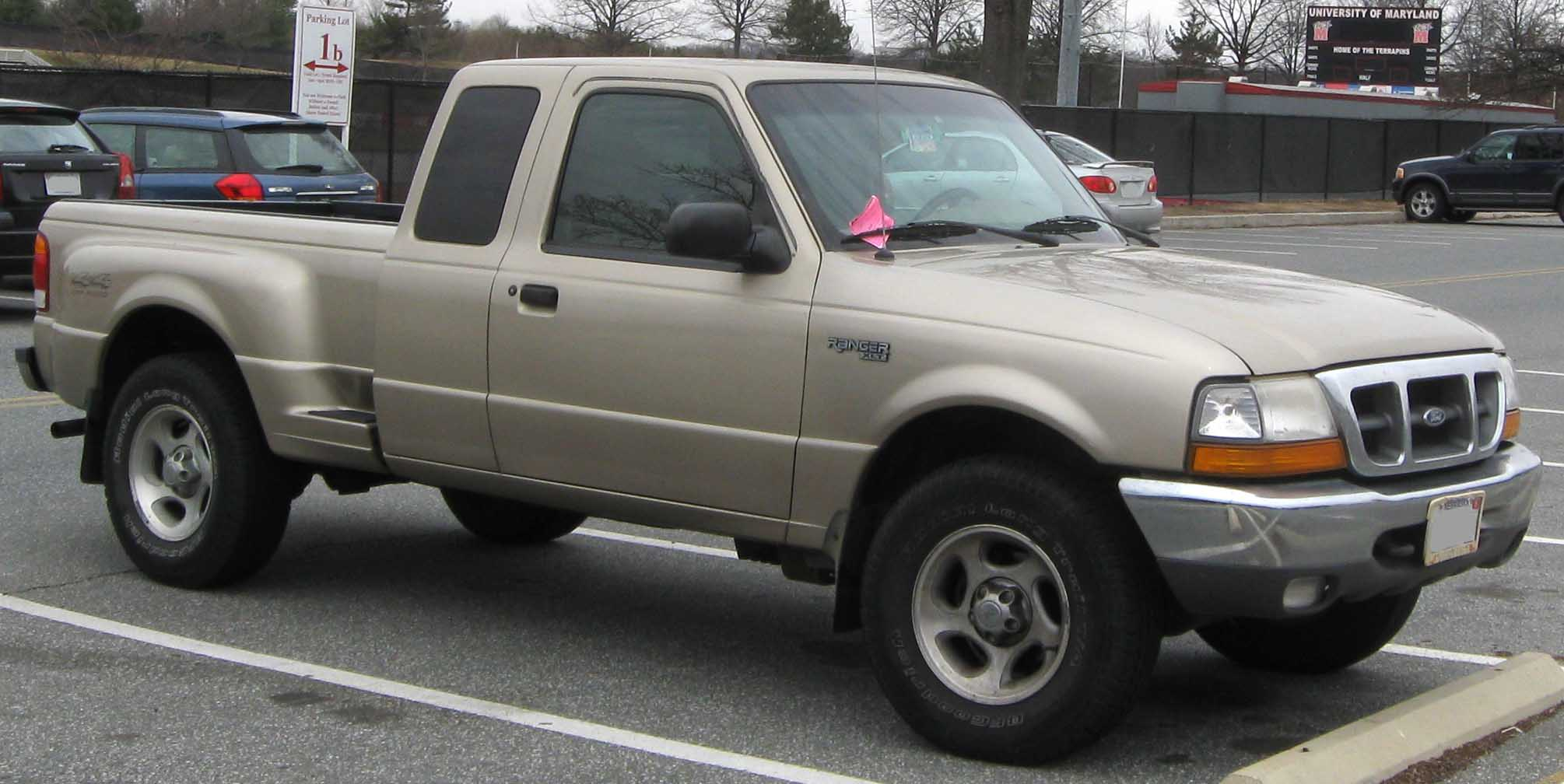
Third generation (1998–2000)

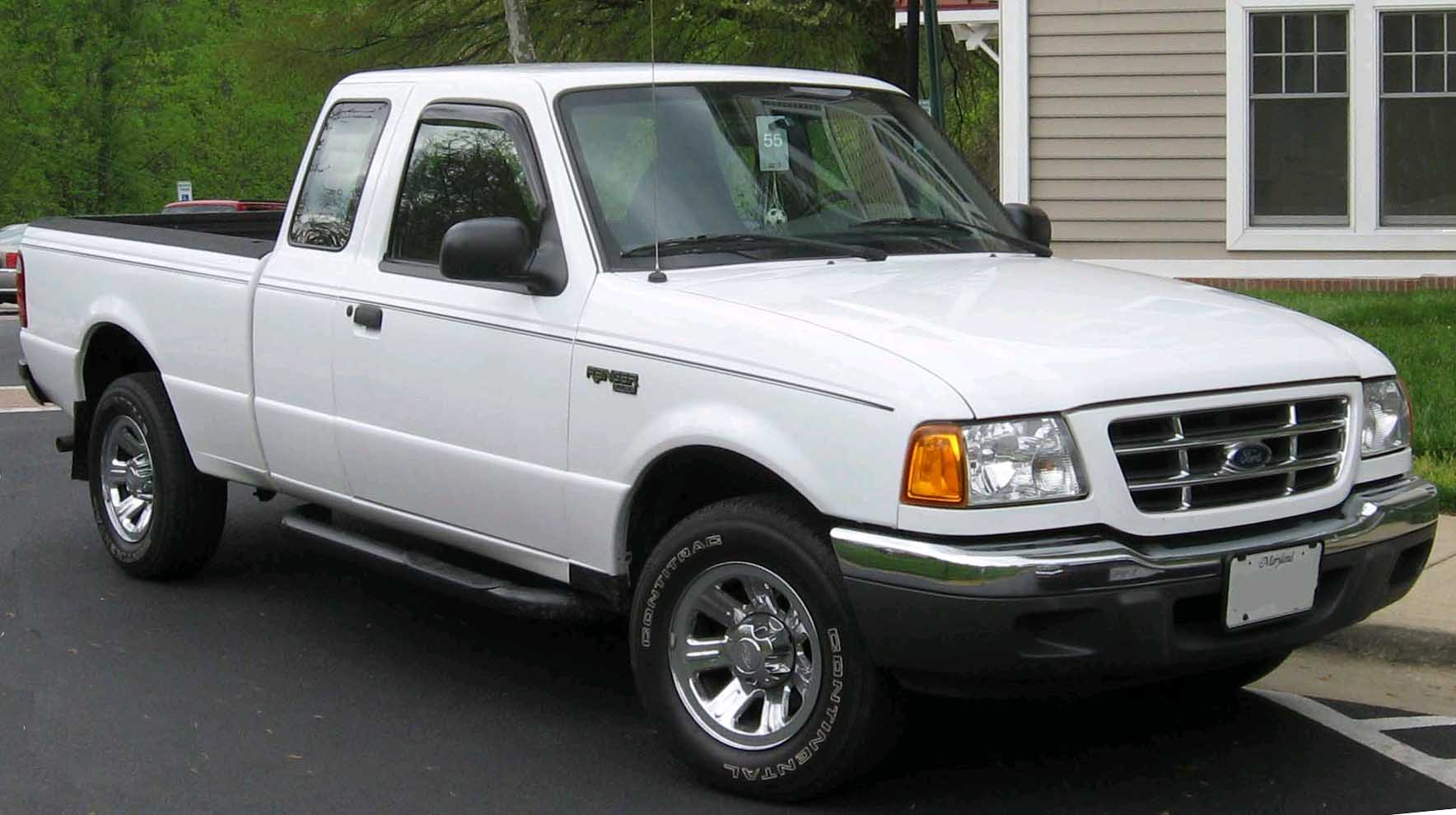
Third generation, first facelift (2001–2003)

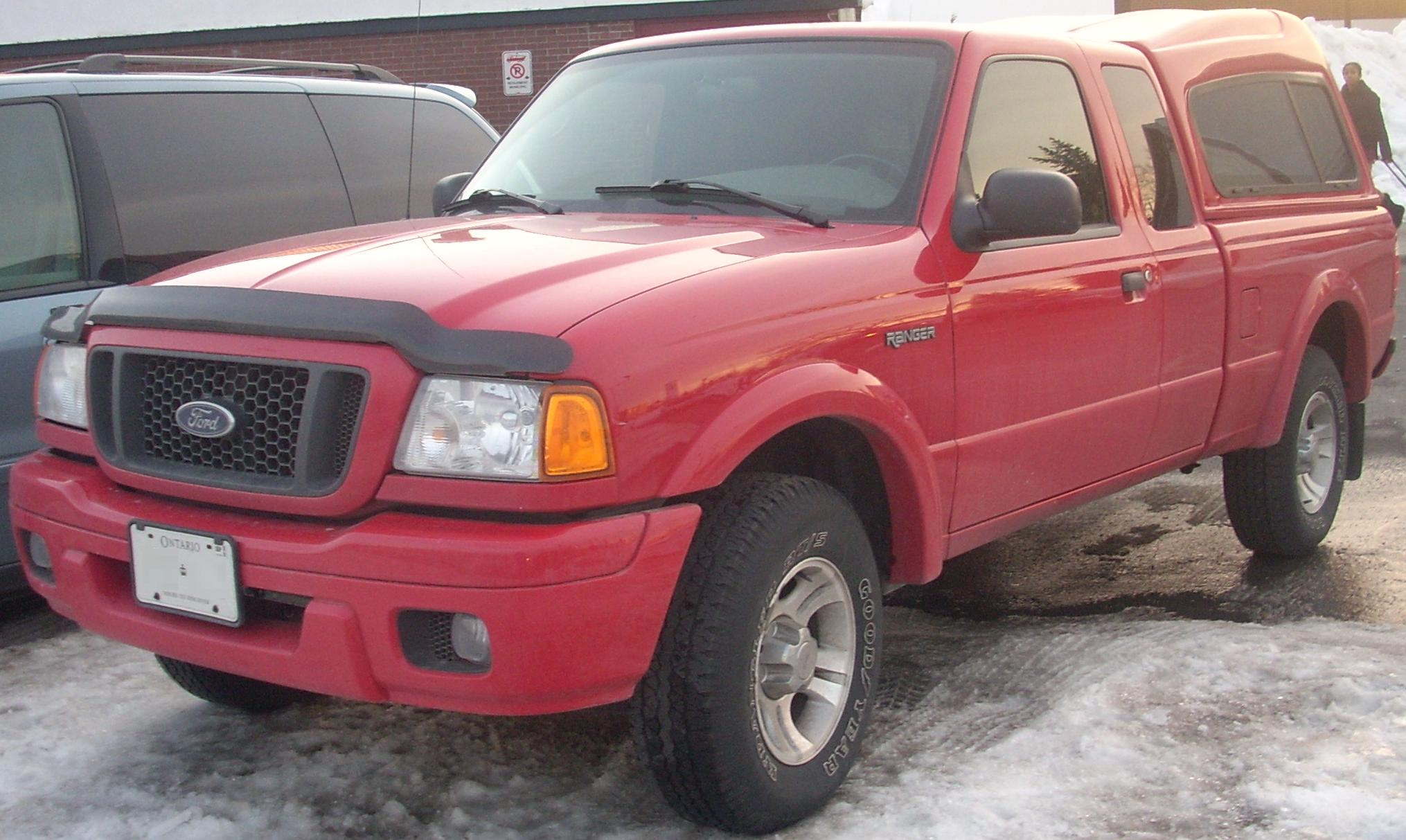
Third generation, second facelift (2004–2006)

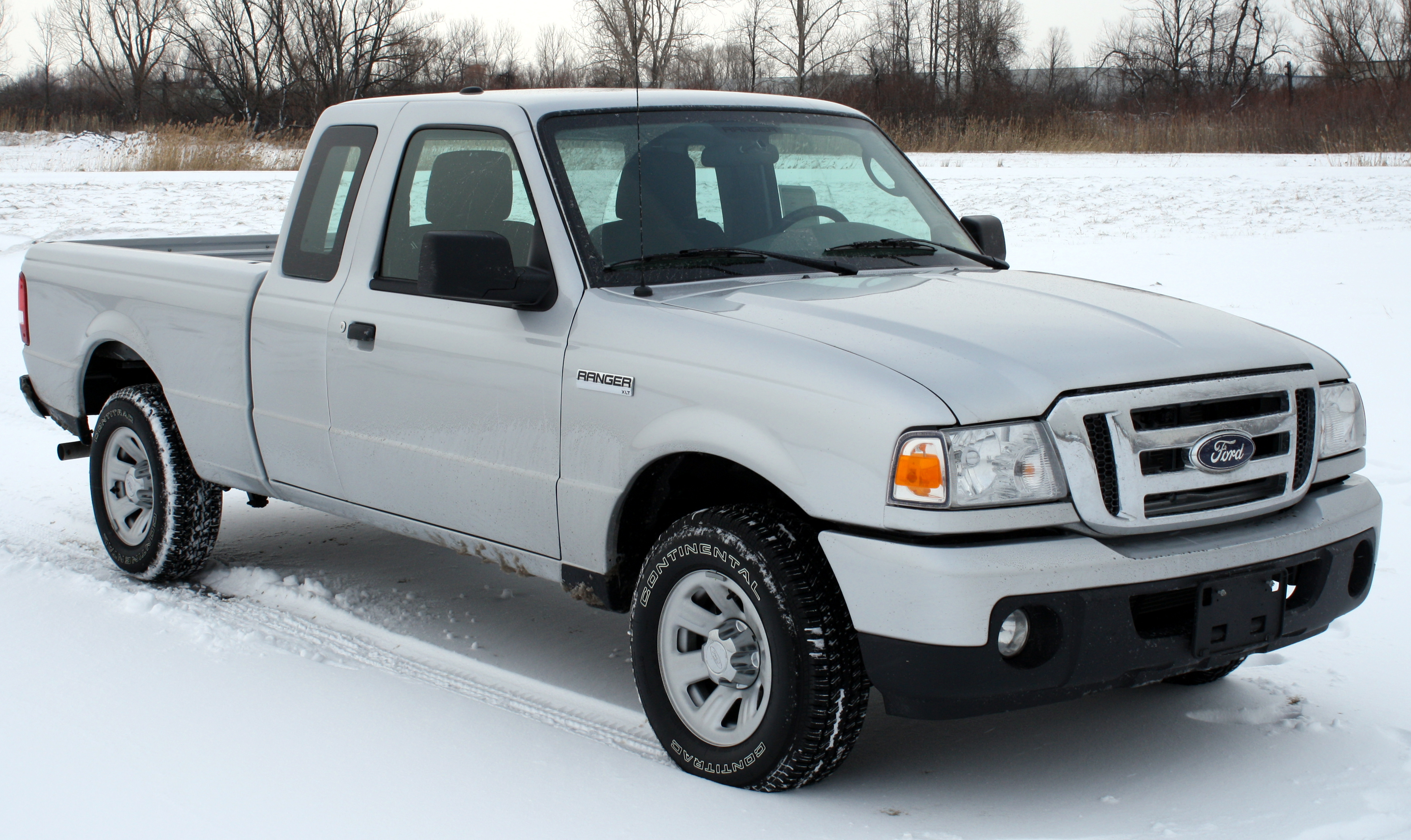
Third generation, third facelift (2006–2012)

==== Mid-size pickup (2019–present) ====
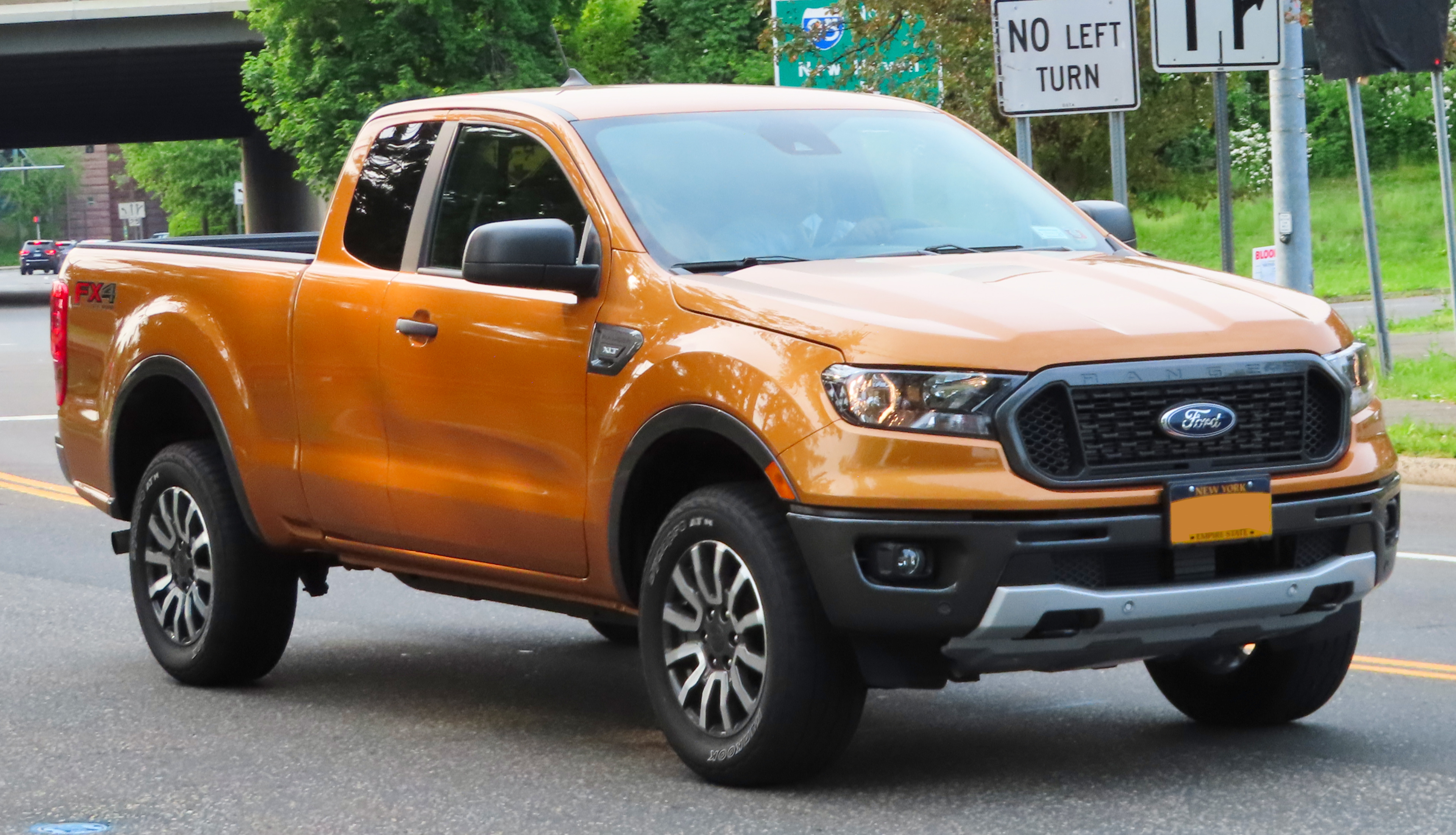
2019 Ford Ranger (US)

For the 2019 model year, the Ranger returned to its model range in North America after an eight-year hiatus to slot below the F-Series. The first example was assembled on October 22, 2018. The first generation of the model line sold as a mid-size pickup truck, the fourth-generation Ranger is derived from the global-market Ranger T6 designed by Ford Australia with adaptations accommodate US government regulations along with other modifications made to match local market demands.

The current generation of the Ranger is offered in two configurations on a 127-inch wheelbase, including a 2+2 door SuperCab (6-foot bed) and a 4-door SuperCrew (5-foot bed). With the current model, the two-door standard cab is not offered for sale in North America.

The model line is manufactured by Ford at its Michigan Assembly Plant at Wayne, Michigan.

=== South America ===
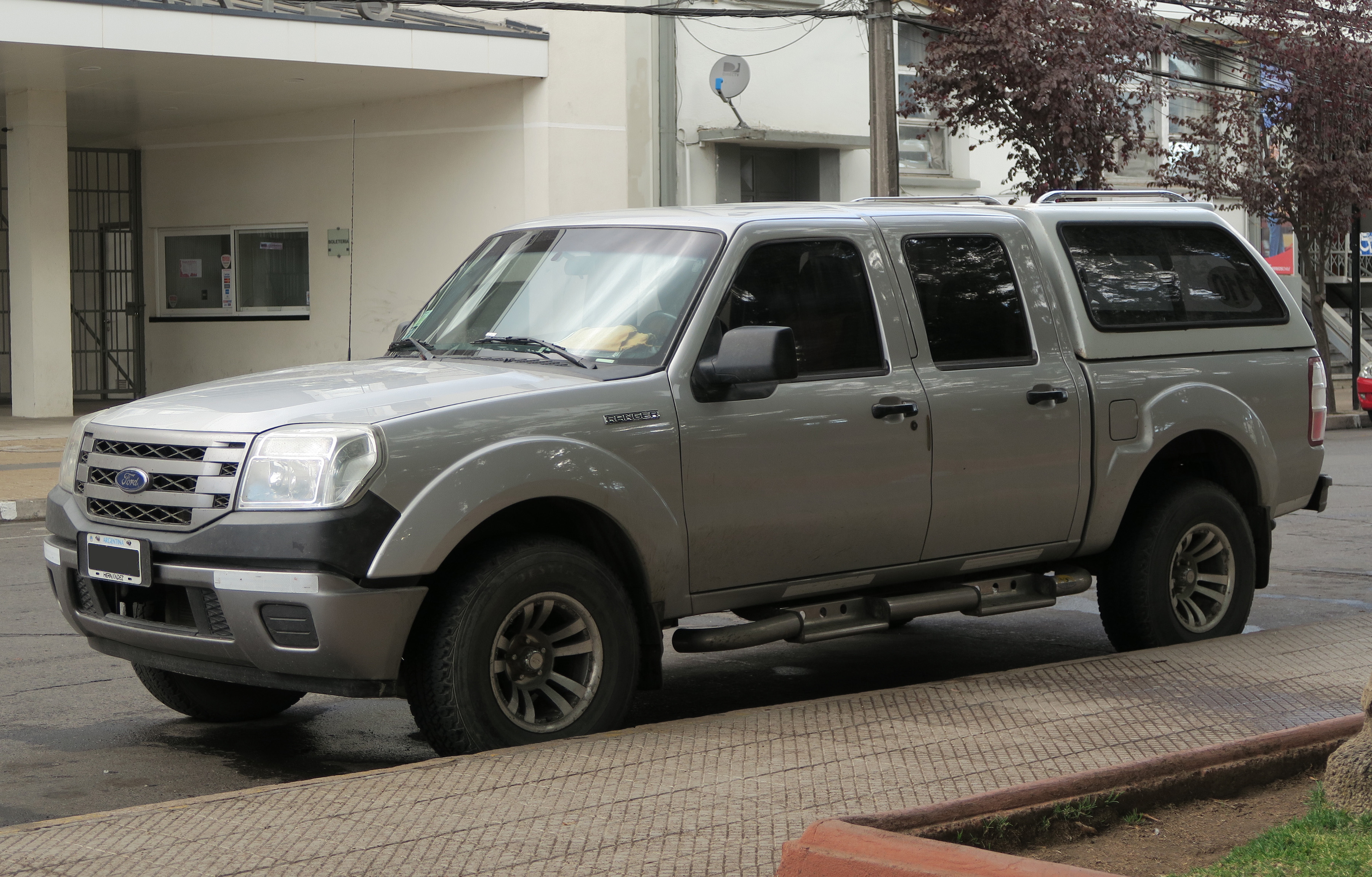
Third generation, fourth facelift (South America, 2010–2012)

In 1995, exports of the Ranger began to select Latin and South American countries. To accommodate the demand for the vehicle, Ford Argentina commenced local production of the Ranger in 1998, introducing a four-door cab not sold in North America. During the 2000s, Rangers produced by Ford Argentina shared a common chassis with North American-produced vehicles, while offering a diesel engine option to meet local demand. For 2010, the locally-produced Ranger underwent a final exterior revision exclusive to the South American market.

Ford Argentina ended production of the compact Ranger following the 2011 model year to shift its production to its replacement, the mid-size Ranger T6.

== International ==
=== Mazda-based (1998–2011) ===
In 1971, Ford entered the compact truck segment as it marketed the second-generation Mazda B series under the Ford Courier nameplate; the Courier was marketed worldwide. For 1983, the Ranger replaced the Courier in North America, while Ford continued to source the Courier from Mazda for global markets into the 1990s, following the development of the B-Series model line. In 1998, Ford introduced the Ranger name on Mazda-sourced pickup trucks, however the Courier name continued through 2006 in Australia and New Zealand.

The first-generation Mazda-based Ranger was produced from 1998 to 2006, while the second generation was produced from 2006 to 2011; the latter was derived from the Mazda BT-50 (which replaced the Mazda B series). These Ranger models were sold in Asia, Australasia, Europe, Africa, and several Latin American markets.

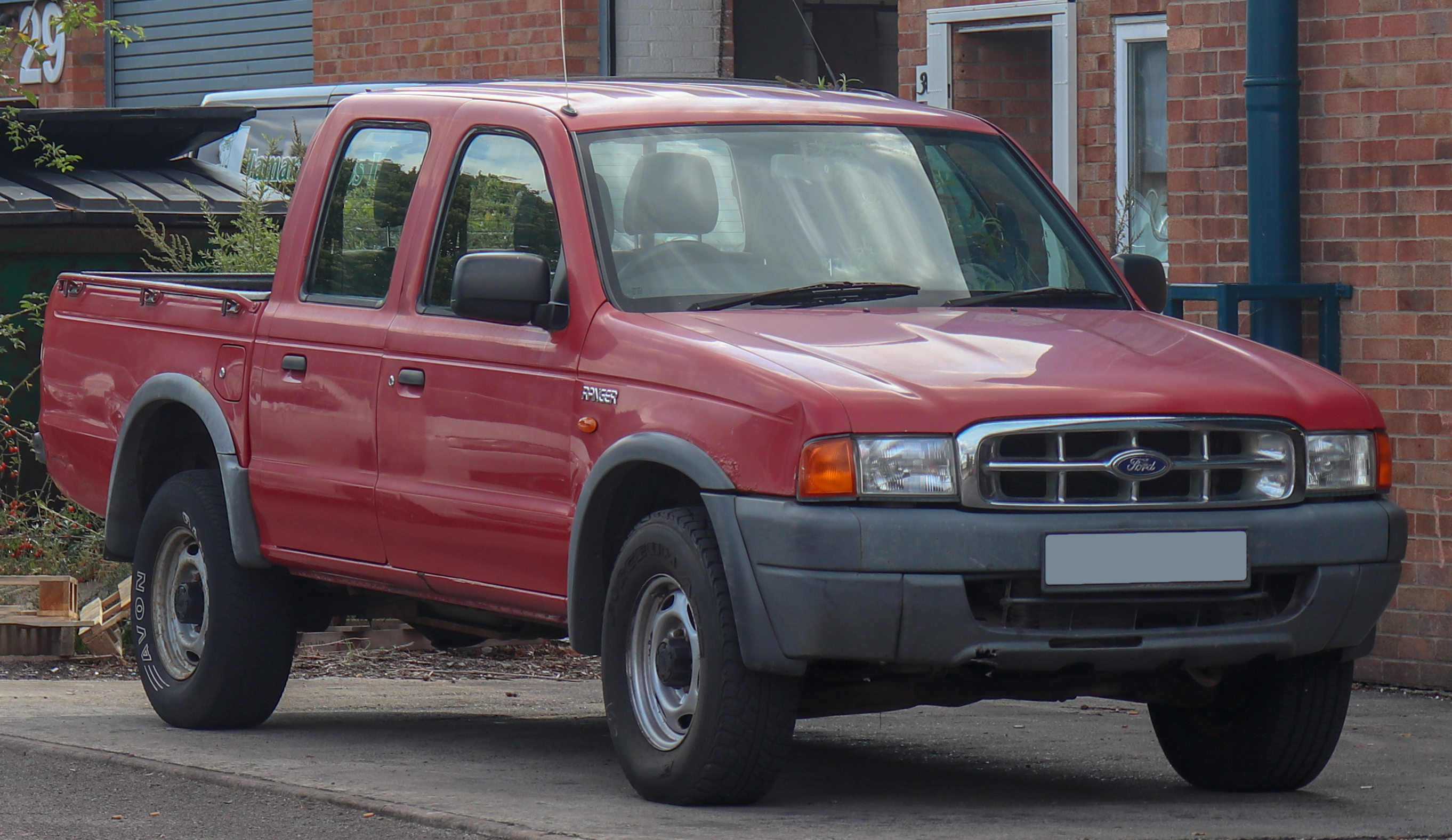
First generation (1998–2002)

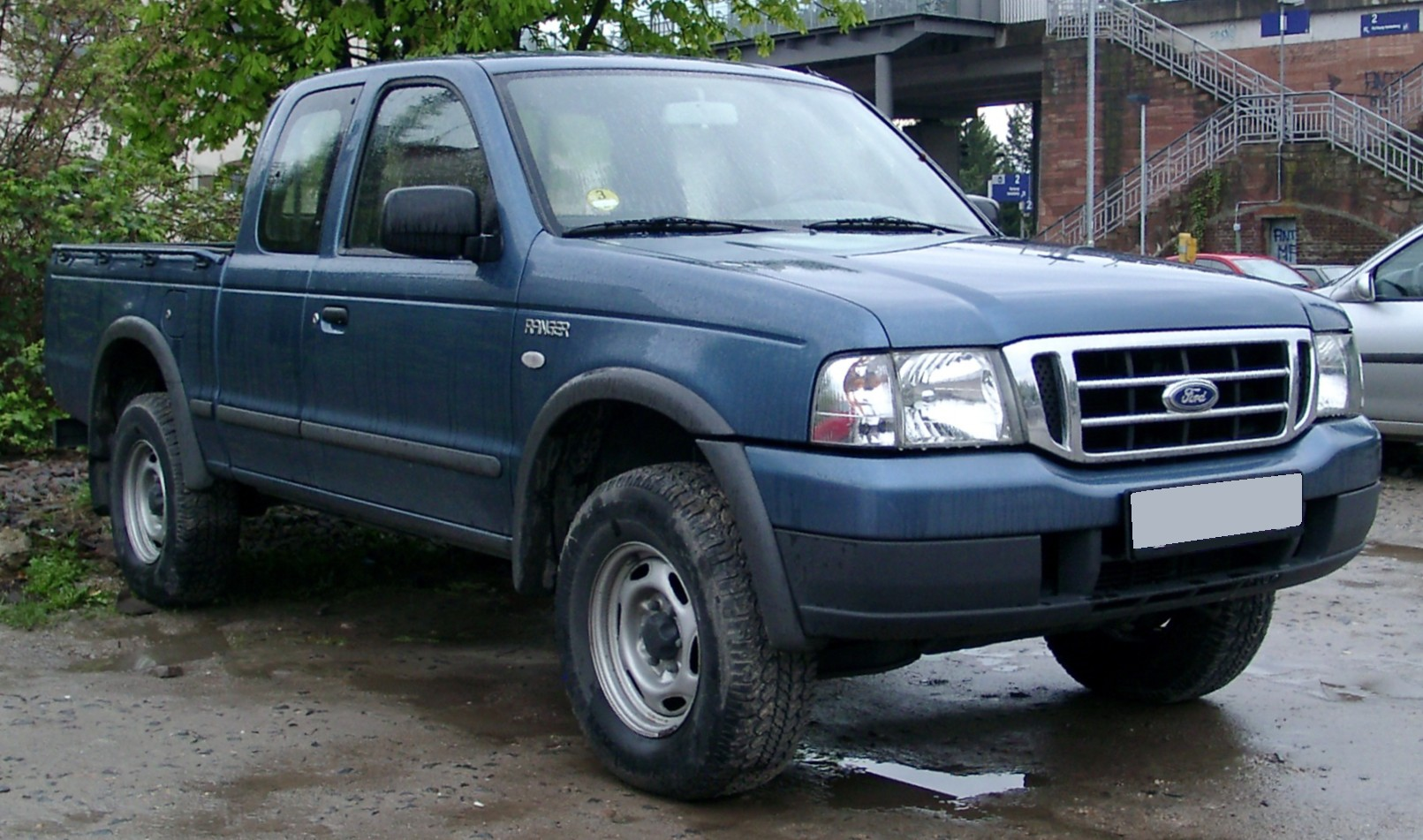
First generation facelift (2002–2006)

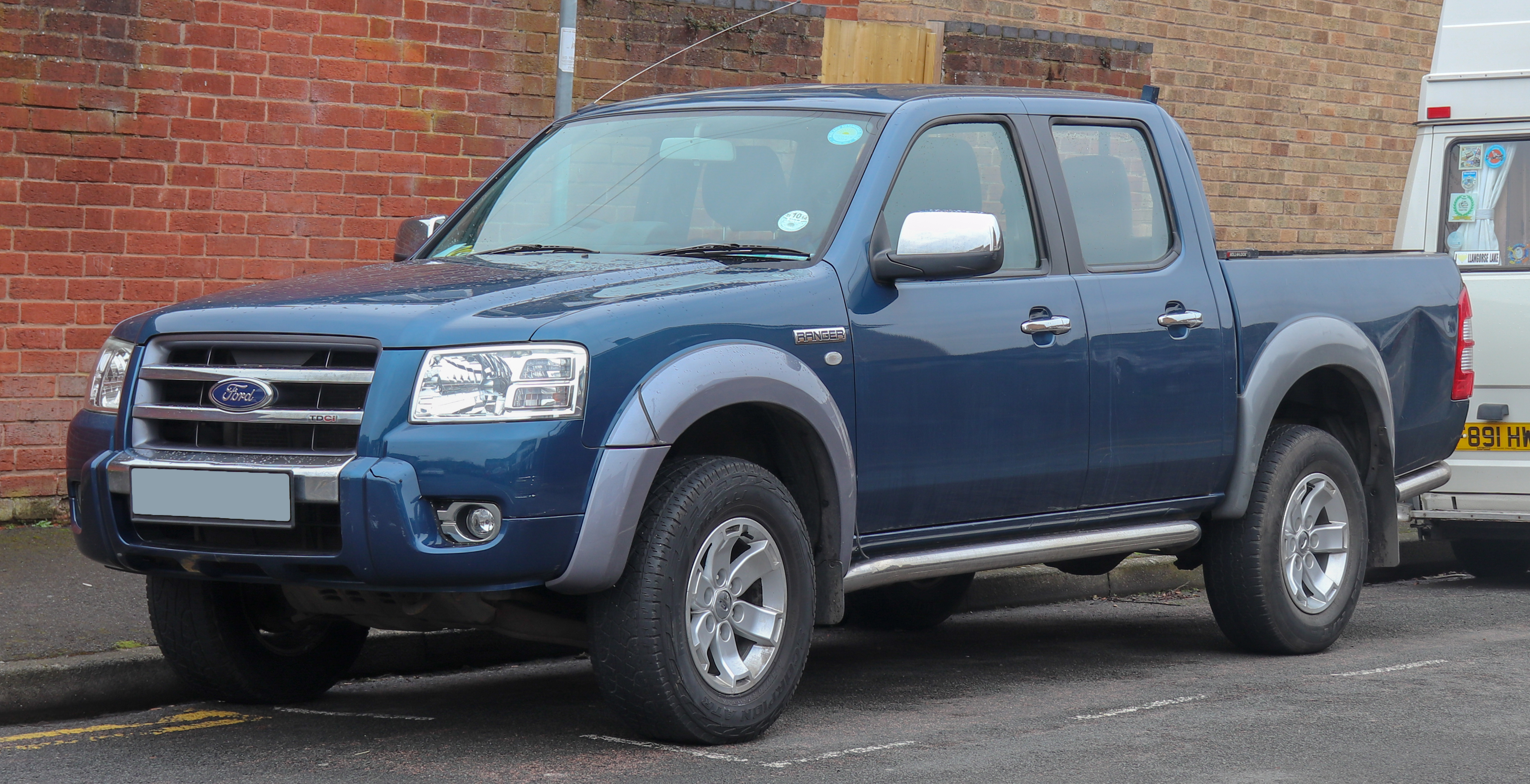
Second generation (2006–2009)

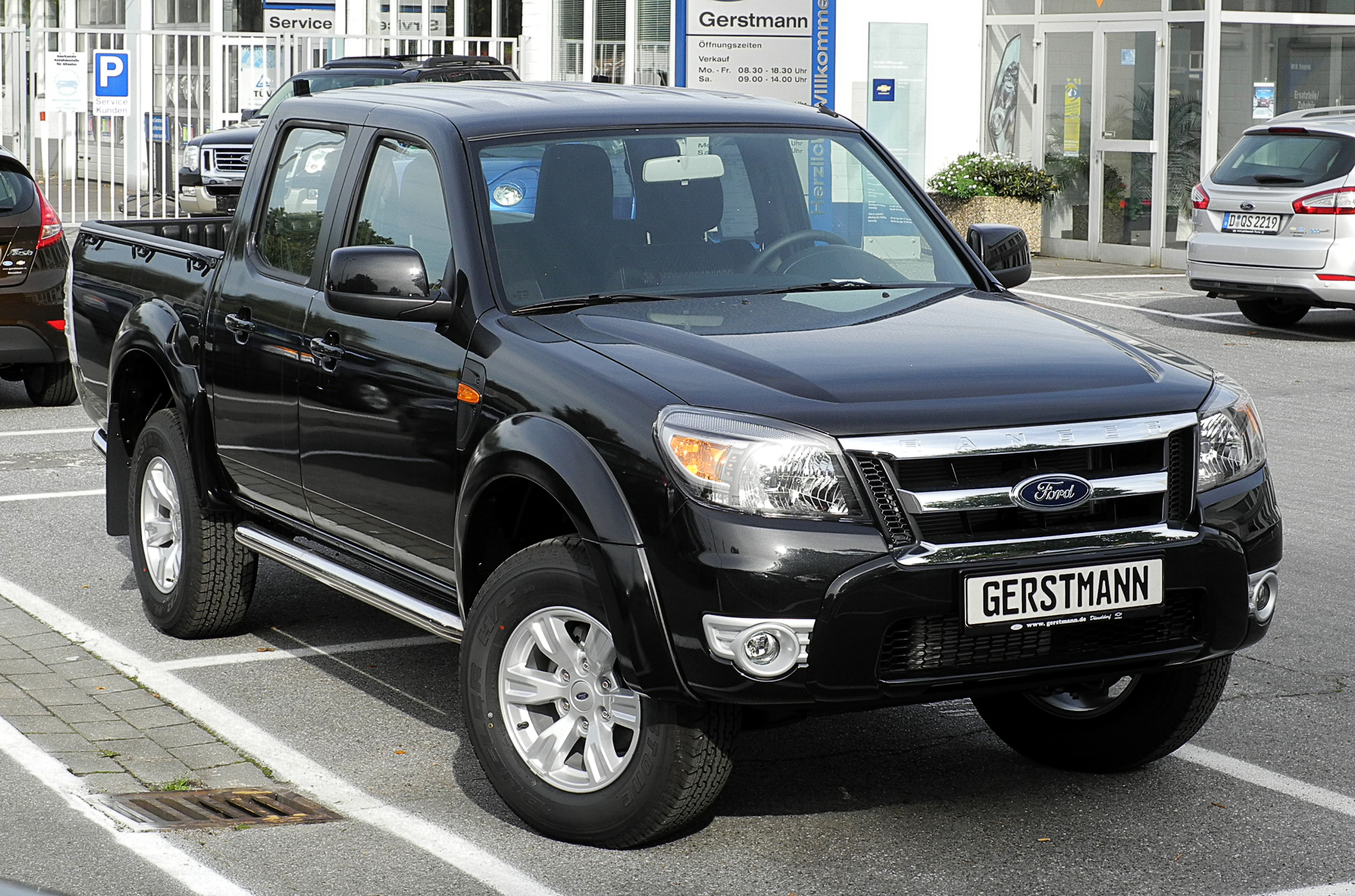
Second generation facelift (2009–2011)

=== T6 platform-based (2011–present) ===
In 2011, Ford introduced the first Ranger based on the T6 platform (codename: P375). Developed by Ford Australia, the T6-based Ranger replaced the American and Mazda-sourced Rangers with a single model, also forming a basis of the second-generation Mazda BT-50. The T6-based Ranger models are marketed worldwide, although it was not marketed in the United States and Canada between 2011 and 2018 model years. The second generation model of the T6-based Ranger (codename: P703) was released in 2021, featuring major changes while riding on a revised T6 platform dubbed the "T6.2".

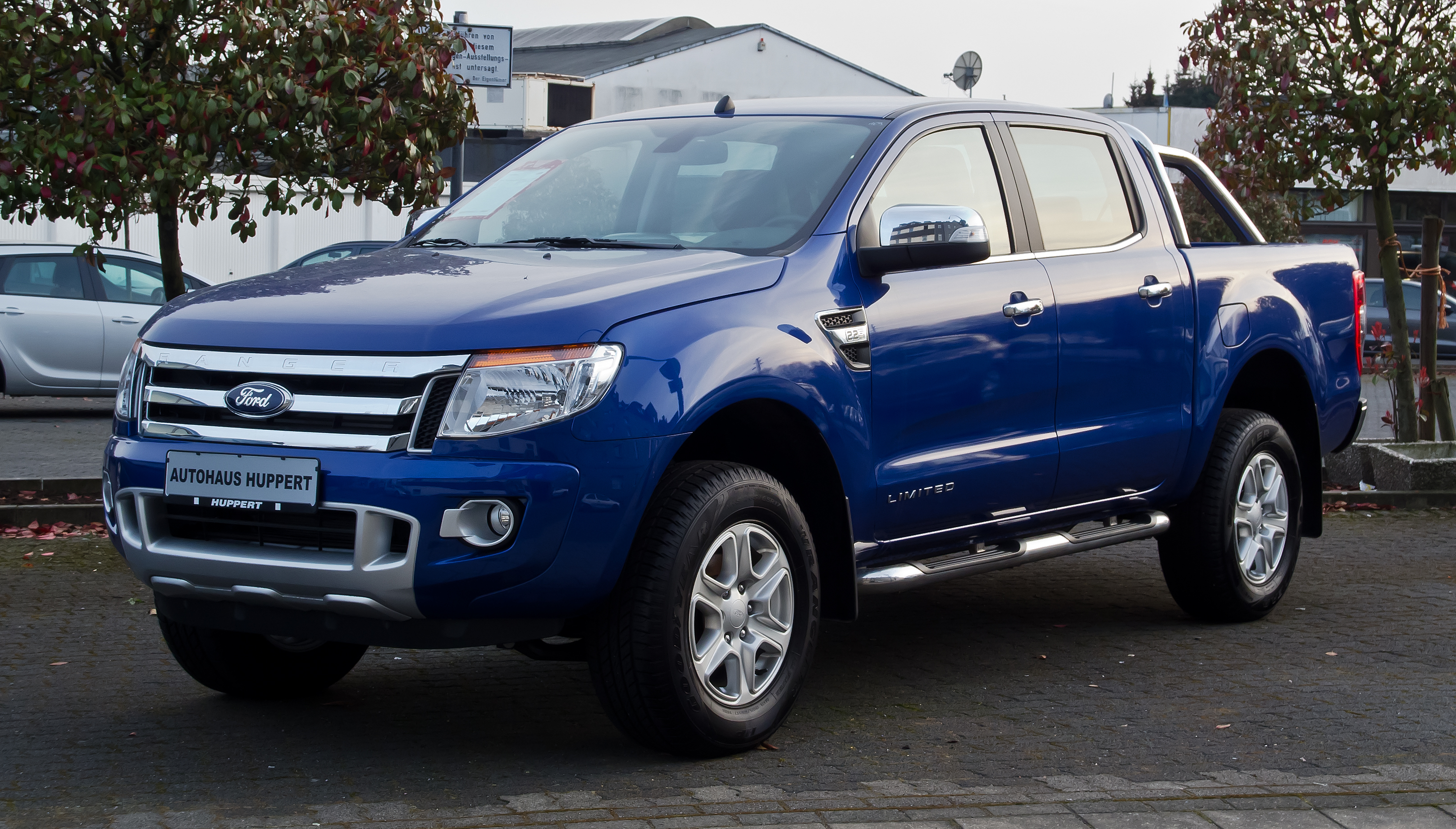
First generation Ranger T6 (2011–2015)

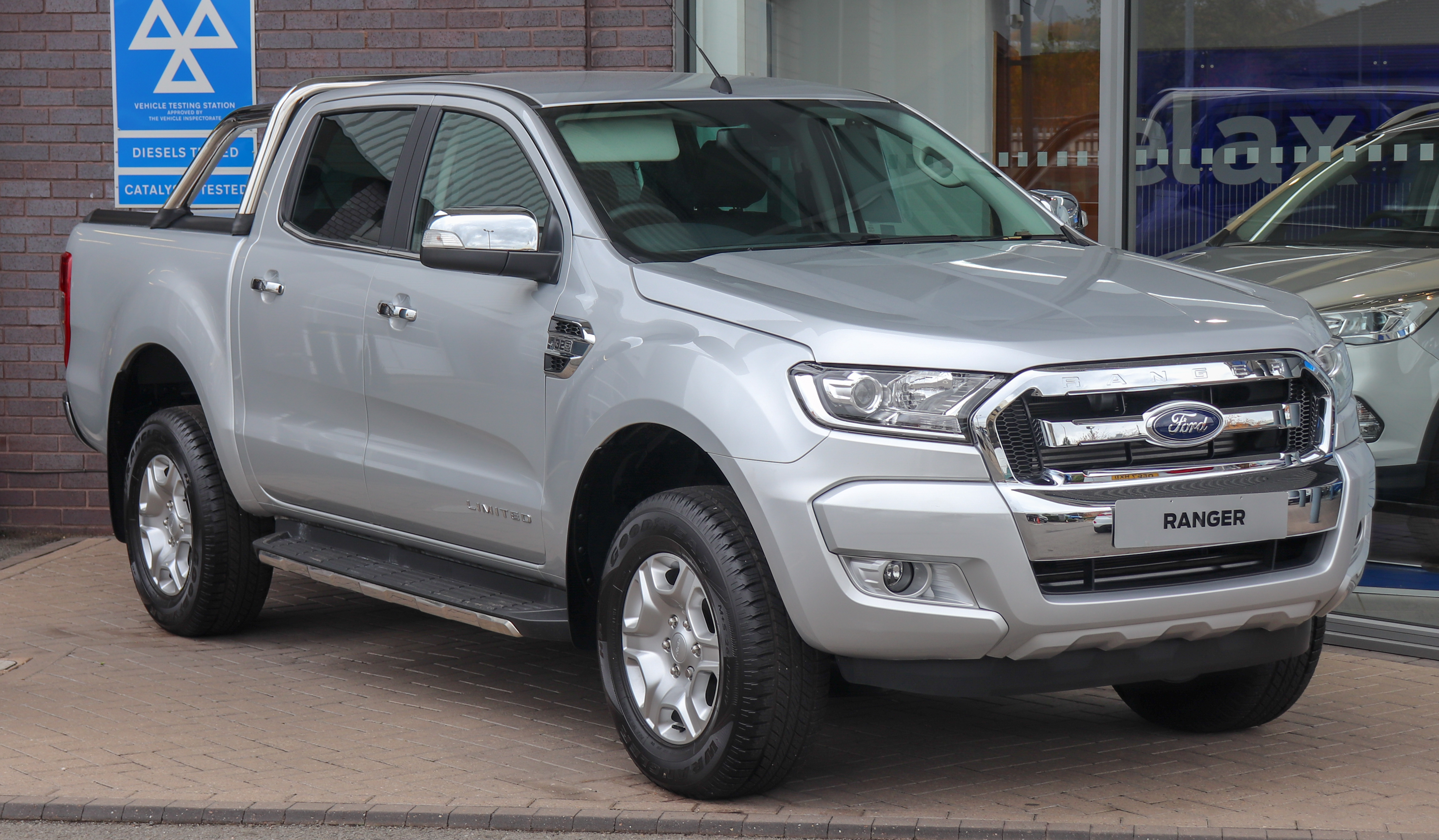
First generation Ranger T6 (facelift, 2015–2018)

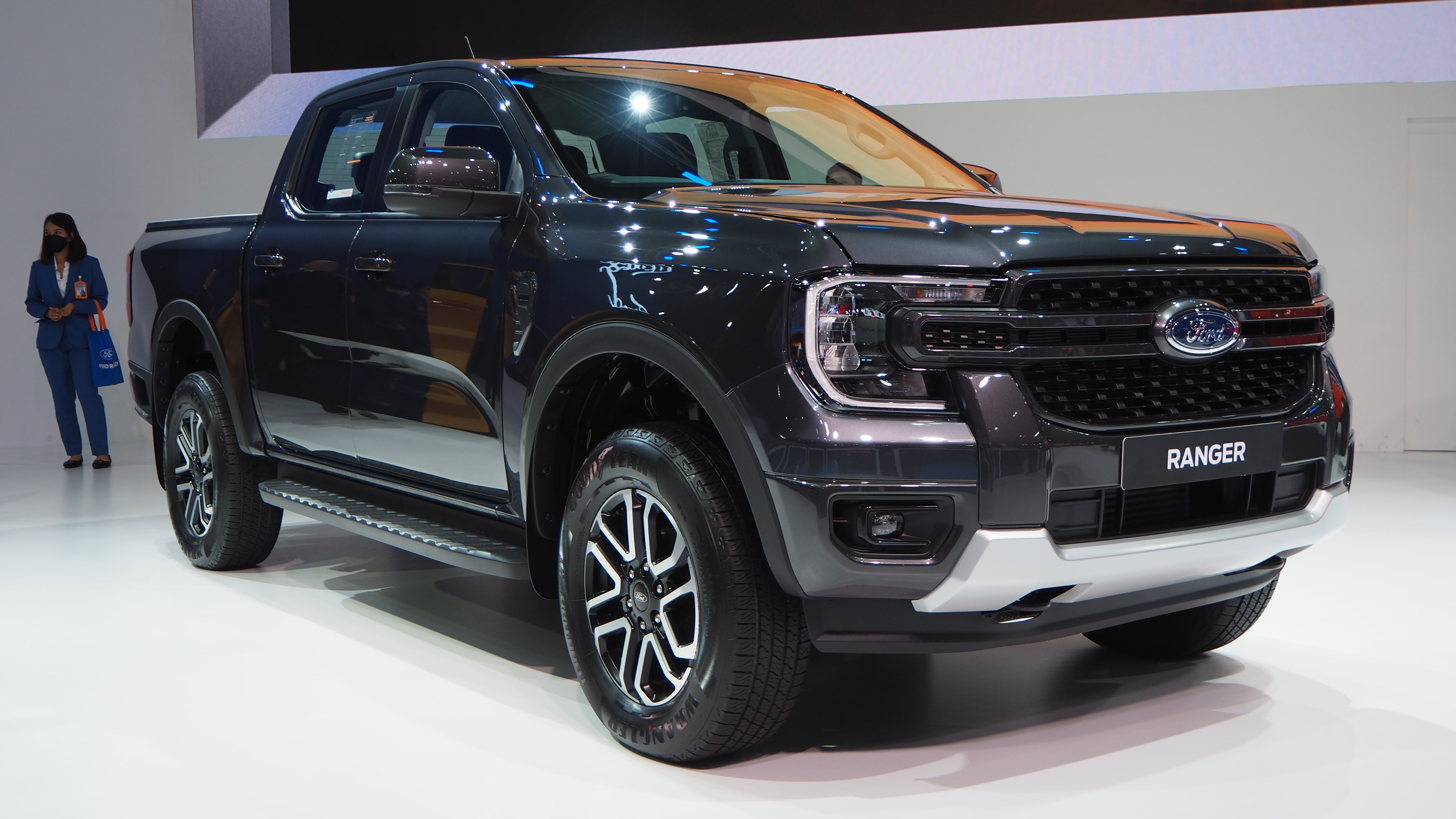
Second generation Ranger T6.2 (2022–present)
