= Compact sport utility vehicle =

Type of SUV sized between a mini SUV and a mid-size SUV

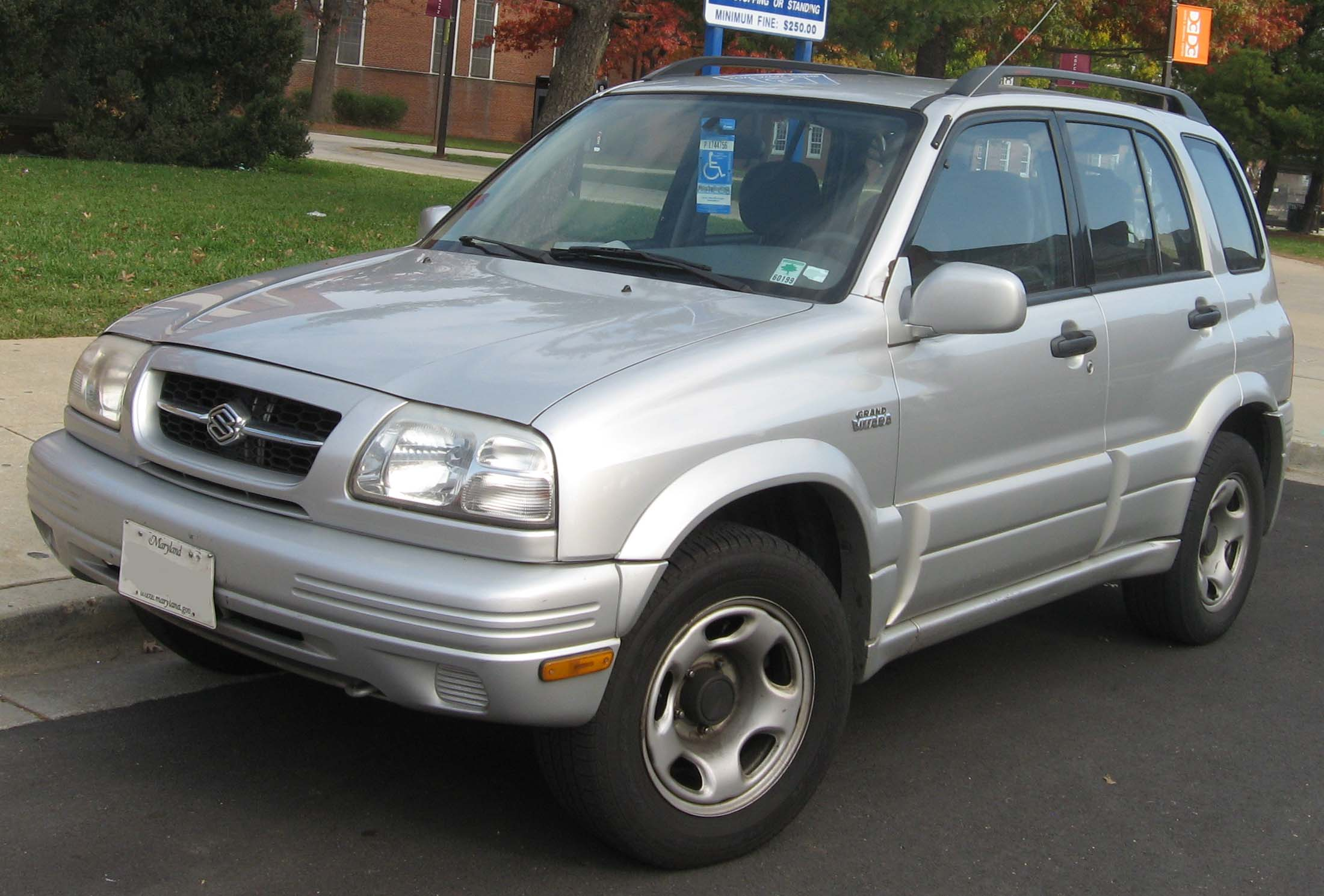
Suzuki Escudo/Vitara 4-door (1998–2005)

A compact sport utility vehicle or compact SUV is a class of small sport utility vehicles that is larger than mini SUVs, but smaller than mid-size SUVs. However, there is no official definition of the size or dimensions for this market segment. Moreover, some manufacturers have marketed the same model name on different sized vehicles over time. The most common distinction between versions of crossover automobiles and compact-sized SUVs is that the first is based on a car-based unibody platform, while an SUV uses the unibody with welded-in ladder frame or body-on-frame chassis commonly used on trucks. However, manufacturers and common usage has blurred the two terms. Many recent vehicles labelled as compact SUVs are technically compact crossovers and are built on the platform of a compact/C-segment passenger car, while some models may be based on a mid-size car (D-segment) or a B-segment platform.

The modern compact SUV market segment began in 1983. According to a Car and Driver review in 2019, the compact crossover and SUV market segment is popular because the vehicles "are right-sized, right-priced, and blend carlike refinement with a touch of utility."

== Background ==
=== United States ===
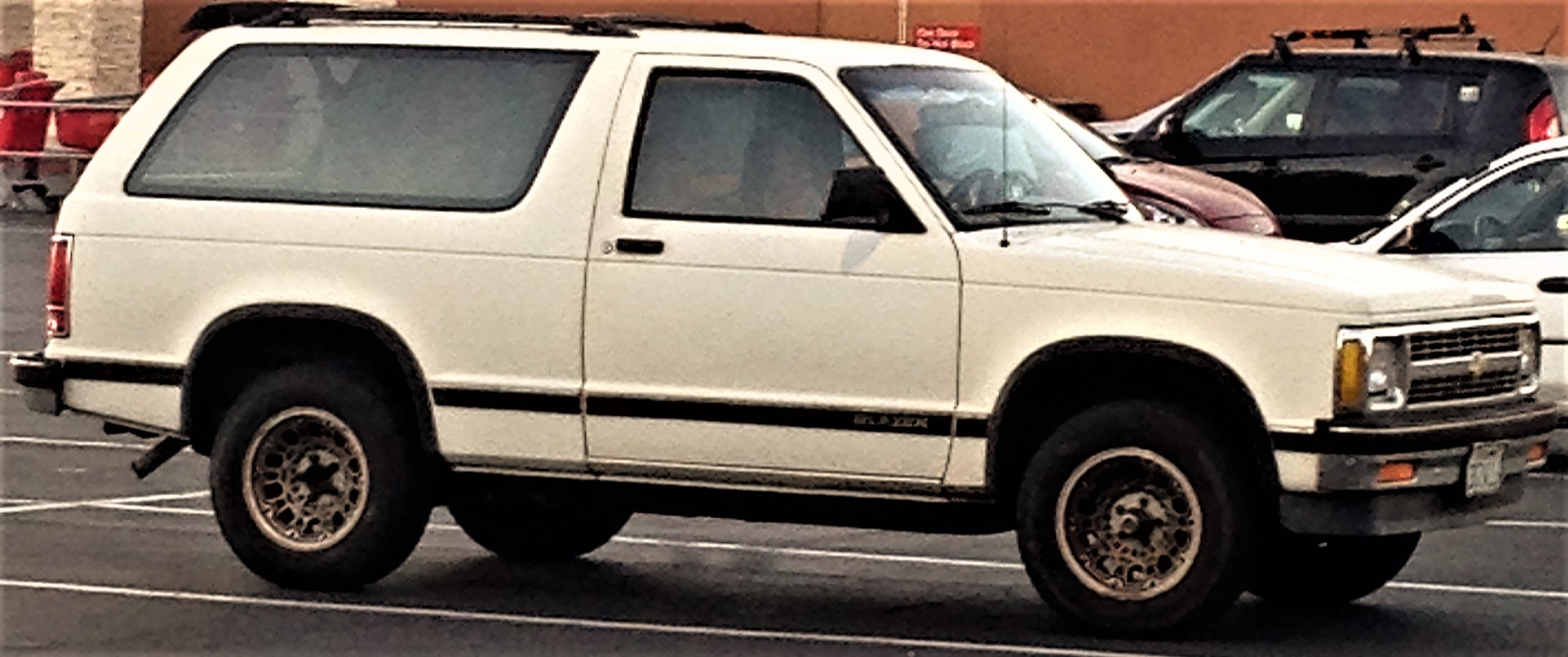
A two-door Chevrolet S-10 Blazer

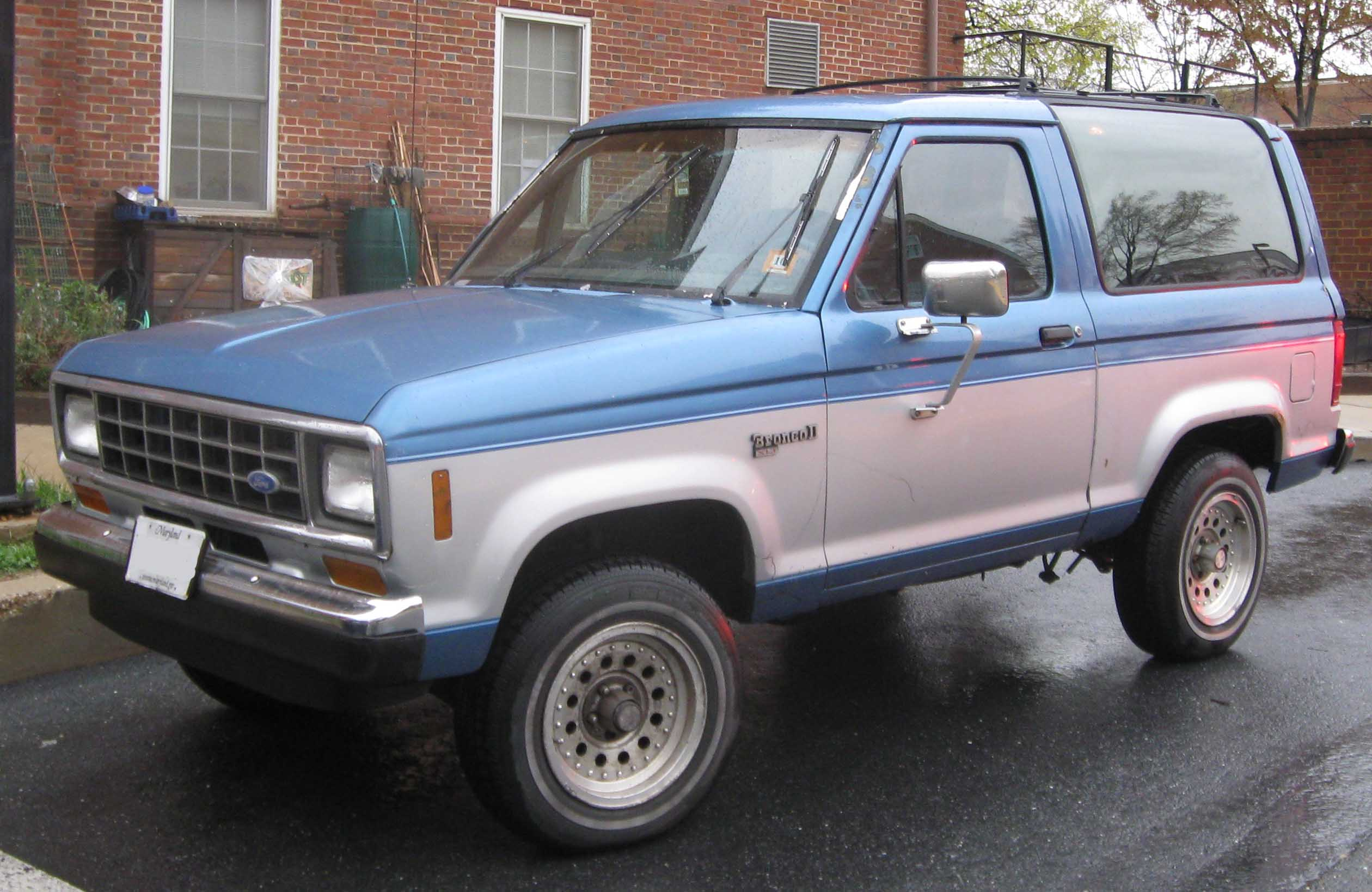
A two-door Ford Bronco II

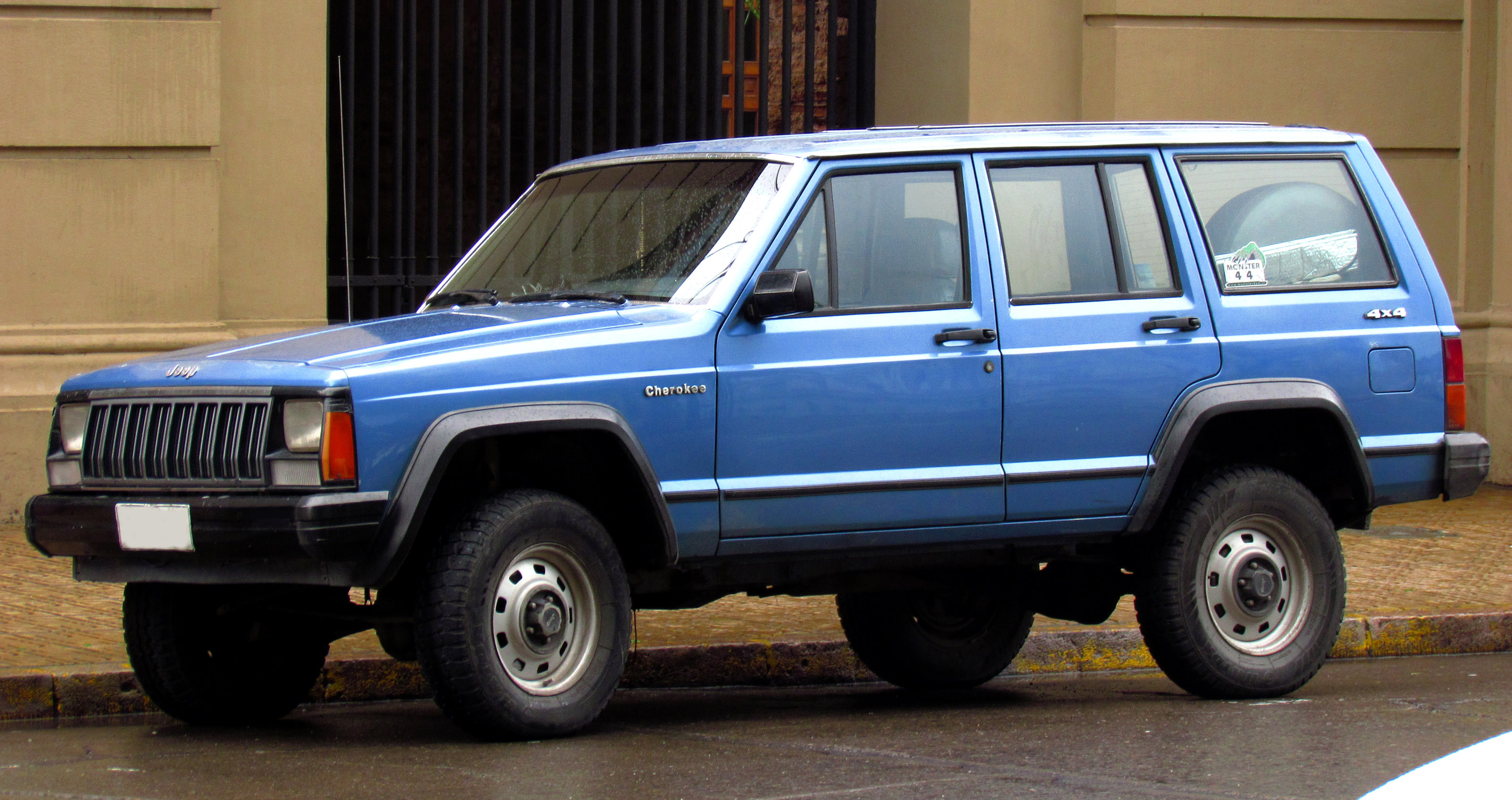
Jeep Cherokee (XJ), the first purpose-designed unibody compact SUV with 4-doors

Small-sized utility-type vehicles have been available since the advent of the first automobiles. The modern use of the "compact sport utility" category can be traced in the United States marketplace to the 1982-1994 Chevrolet S-10 Blazer and the 1984-1990 Ford Bronco II because they are considered compact-sized SUVs that were built on a compact truck chassis. They were marketed alongside the Chevrolet K5 Blazer and Ford Bronco full-size 4x4 vehicles. The compact two-door 1983 Chevrolet S-10 Blazer featured four-wheel drive with a four-cylinder engine as standard and Ford brought out the similar Bronco II model. Both were body-on-frame designs based on each automaker's small pickup trucks, the Chevrolet S-10 and Ford Ranger respectively. The general dimensions, drive train, and cab details were identical to those of the compact truck with differences in the interior only aft of the doors. Both were station wagon-like vehicles with seating for four adults and an enclosed cargo area with a rear hatchback.

American Motors made the full-sized Jeep Wagoneer (SJ) SUV using a truck chassis, but developed a completely new and slim unibody Jeep Cherokee (XJ) line of two- and four-door compact sport wagons that were marketed starting in late 1983. These are often considered the first compact American four-door sport utility vehicles. While the competing SUVs were adaptations of compact pickup trucks, Jeep did not have one, so they designed an SUV first; starting with a four-door version and featuring a very strong, lightweight unibody construction like most passenger cars, as well as with a lightweight "link/coil" suspension design that was praised by the automotive press for its superior ride, performance, and handling. The original Jeep XJ combined a passenger car comfort with a rugged chassis for ease of driving in difficult conditions, and established the modern SUV market segment. Automobile magazine called it a "masterpiece" of automotive design with room for five passengers and their cargo.

According to Bob Lutz, an executive at several car companies, American Motors (AMC) "invented an all-new automotive segment—the compact sport utility vehicle" with the original compact Jeep Cherokee two- and four-door models. The compact Cherokee's design, appearance, and sales popularity spawned imitators as other automakers noticed that the Jeep XJ models began replacing regular cars. Compact SUVs have become an alternative to the minivans for families who need cargo space. While almost unchanged since its introduction, Cherokee XJ production continued through 2005 in China, and was one of the best-selling compact SUVs in the world. There were over 2.8 million Jeep XJs built in the U.S. between 1984 and 2001. According to a 1995 review by the American Automobile Association, AMC's "clever marketing helped create the present demand for compact sport-utility vehicles."

=== Japan ===
The Japanese 1988 Suzuki Vitara is also considered to be a compact SUV.
