= Expansion =

Expansion may refer to:

== Arts, entertainment and media ==
- L'Expansion, a French monthly business magazine
- Expansion (album), by American jazz pianist Dave Burrell, released in 2004
- Expansions (McCoy Tyner album), 1970
- Expansions (Lonnie Liston Smith album), 1975
- Expansión (Mexico), a Mexican news portal linked to CNN
- Expansion (sculpture) (2004), bronze sculpture illuminated from within
- Expansión (Spanish newspaper), a Spanish economic daily newspaper published in Spain
- Expansion pack in gaming, extra content for games, often simply "expansion"

== Science, technology, and mathematics ==
- Expansion (geometry), stretching of geometric objects with flat sides
- Expansion (model theory), in mathematical logic, a mutual converse of a reduct
- Expansion card, in computing, a printed circuit board that can be inserted into an expansion slot
- Expansion chamber, on a two-stroke engine, a tuned exhaust system that enhances power output
- Expansion joint, an assembly that absorbs heat-induced expansion and contraction of construction materials
- Joule–Thomson effect or Joule–Thomson expansion, the decrease in temperature of a gas when it expands
- Thermal expansion, the tendency of matter to change in shape, area, and volume in response to a change in temperature
- Expansion of the universe, the increase of the distance between two distant parts of the universe with time

== Economics ==
- Expansion (economics), an increase in the market value of an economy over time

== Sport ==
- Expansion team, a new team in a sports league

== Other uses ==
- MV Expansion, a former name of American cargo liner MV Dennis Winn

== See also ==
- Expansion chamber (disambiguation)
- Elasticity (disambiguation)
- Expansionism, a policy of enlarging territory or economic influence
- Stretching
