= Michael Wolff Metternich =

German automobile historian (1920–2018)

Michael Graf Wolff Metternich zur Gracht (1920–2018) was a German automobile historian.

== Life ==
Born on 21 July 1920 in Eupen, the trained farmer and later representative of a large insurance company operated since the 1960s in the German classic car scene. On 13. February 1967 he was founding president of the Maybach Club, whose honorary president he was. Since 1965 he contributed as an author of numerous articles, technical contributions and books as well as lecturer to the mediation of the history of the automobile. Among other things, he wrote standard works on the automotive brands Maybach and Rumpler, also on topics like Tricycles and Rocket cars. Wolff Metternich is a founding member of Automobile History Society (AHG).

Michael Graf Wolff Metternich zur Gracht was married to Ingmarie, born Freiin von Ritter von Groenesteyn, and had a son. The family lived in the Castle Weilbach in Florsheim am Main, where he died on 14 February 2018. There, he also was engaged in local politics for CDU party.

== Publications ==
- with Sedgwick, Michael: Auto-Veteranen. Frankfurt am Main, 1965.
- Die Geschichte der Maybach-Automobile. Nettelstedt, 1969.
- Der Kompressor. Vom Zoller-Verdichter zum Lader von morgen. München, 1983.
- Edmund Rumpler – Konstrukteur und Erfinder, München, 1986. ISBN 3-923581-10-6
- Hundert Jahre auf 3 Rädern. München, 1993. ISBN 3-929956-00-4
- Distanz zur Masse. Karl Maybachs extravagante Autokonstruktionen. München, 1993.
- Deutsche Raketenfahrzeuge auf Straße, Schiene und Eis 1928 bis 1931. Lorch, 1997.
- mit Neubauer, Hans-Otto: Sie bauten Autos. Die vergessene Autowelt der deutschsprachigen Automobilkonstrukteure 1885 - 1945. Lorch, 2004.

== Awards ==
- Bundesverdienstkreuz
- 2005 Award of Distinction der amerikanischen Society of Automotive Historians (SAH)
