= Compact =

Compact as used in politics may refer broadly to a pact or treaty; in more specific cases it may refer to:

- Interstate compact, a type of agreement used by U.S. states
- Blood compact, an ancient ritual of the Philippines
- Compact government, a type of colonial rule utilized in British North America
- Compact of Free Association whereby the sovereign states of the Federated States of Micronesia, the Republic of the Marshall Islands and the Republic of Palau have entered into as associated states with the United States.
- Mayflower Compact, the first governing document of Plymouth Colony
- United Nations Global Compact
- Global Compact for Migration, a UN non-binding intergovernmental agreement

== Mathematics ==
- Compact element, those elements of a partially ordered set that cannot be subsumed by a supremum of any directed set that does not already contain them
- Compact operator, a linear operator that takes bounded subsets to relatively compact subsets, in functional analysis
- Compact space, a topological space such that every open cover has a finite subcover
- Quasi-compact morphism, a morphism of schemes for which the inverse image of any quasi-compact open set is again quasi-compact

== Publications ==
- Compact (American magazine), a U.S.-based online magazine
- Compact (German magazine), a far-right German magazine
- Compact (newspaper), a broadsheet-quality newspaper printed in a tabloid format

== Other uses ==
- Compact car, a classification of automobile size
  - Compact sport utility vehicle
- Compact (cosmetics), a case containing one or more of the following, a mirror, pressed powder, and/or a powder puff
- Compact disc
- Compact Software, a technology company founded in 1973
- Compact (TV series), a 1960s British soap opera
- Compact star, also called a compact object, a degenerate star like a neutron star

== See also ==
- Campact, a German nongovernmental organization
- Kompakt, a German record label
