= Bandwidth compression =

In telecommunications, the term bandwidth compression has the following meanings:

- The reduction of the bandwidth needed to transmit a given amount of data in a given time.
- The reduction of the time needed to transmit a given amount of data in a given bandwidth.

Bandwidth compression implies a reduction in normal bandwidth of an information-carrying signal without reducing the information content of the signal. This can be accomplished with lossless data compression techniques. For more information read the Increasing speeds section in the Modem article. Bandwidth Compression is a core feature of WAN Optimization appliances to improve bandwidth efficiency.

== Definition and types ==
The concept encompasses a wide range of engineering methods and algorithms that aim to minimize the volume of data transmitted or stored, either by eliminating redundancies or by reducing the precision of information where acceptable. These techniques are categorized broadly into lossless and lossy methods, depending on whether the original data can be perfectly reconstructed. While lossless methods are essential in contexts that require full data fidelity, such as financial records or command-and-control systems, lossy approaches are more suitable for applications like video streaming or voice communication, where perceptual quality can be maintained despite some data loss.

== Importance and development ==
With the proliferation of wireless sensor networks (WSNs) and the Internet of things (IoT), bandwidth compression has become vital for maintaining low-power operation and scalable network deployment. In such systems, transmitting raw data is often infeasible due to energy and bandwidth limitations. Therefore, advanced compression algorithms are integrated into sensor nodes to preprocess and reduce the amount of data that needs to be sent over the network.

As modern networks move toward higher data rates and greater device density, bandwidth compression continues to evolve alongside emerging technologies such as edge computing, AI-assisted compression, and semantic communication models. These advances promise to further improve transmission efficiency by adapting compression behavior in real time based on context, content, and channel conditions. Bandwidth compression plays a critical role in modern communication systems, particularly as demand for data-intensive services continues to increase. It is not only a means to optimize transmission efficiency but also a strategic response to the limitations of physical infrastructure and spectrum availability. Bandwidth compression techniques are designed to maximize the effective use of available bandwidth, which is especially crucial in mobile communications, satellite links, and embedded systems where resources are highly constrained.

== Lossless compression techniques ==
Lossless compression refers to methods that reduce the data size without any loss of information. Common techniques include Huffman coding, LZW, and Arithmetic coding, which are crucial in systems requiring full data fidelity, such as medical imaging or satellite telemetry. In constrained environments like NB-IoT and EC-GSM networks, these algorithms are employed to optimize energy use and transmission efficiency.

== Lossy compression techniques ==
Lossy compression methods allow for partial loss of data to achieve higher compression ratios. Widely used in multimedia applications, techniques such as the Discrete Cosine Transform and wavelet transforms are essential to standards like JPEG and JPEG 2000. These methods reduce bandwidth demands in applications where slight degradation in quality is acceptable.

== Adaptive and Intelligent Compression ==
Adaptive and intelligent compression techniques utilize machine learning and context-awareness to dynamically adjust compression strategies based on the nature of the data and communication environment. These methods improve efficiency by predicting the most suitable compression parameters or algorithms in real-time, reducing redundancy while maintaining acceptable quality or fidelity.

In IoT and 5G/6G systems, intelligent compression mechanisms leverage edge computing and federated learning to adapt to localized data patterns, achieving better energy efficiency and reduced latency. For example, in multimedia streaming or remote monitoring, these systems may detect changes in user behavior or environmental context to optimize bitrate and avoid unnecessary data transmission.

Furthermore, semantic-aware compression—where data is interpreted and filtered based on meaning rather than raw values—is an emerging trend. It enables systems to prioritize transmission of more relevant or time-sensitive information, significantly enhancing bandwidth efficiency in mission-critical applications.

== Applications in wireless sensor networks ==
Wireless sensor networks (WSNs), which typically operate under stringent power and bandwidth constraints, benefit significantly from bandwidth compression techniques. Recent studies propose rate-distortion optimized methods to compress sensor readings, thereby extending battery life and network lifespan. Such approaches also help reduce transmission congestion in real-time environmental monitoring and smart infrastructure systems.
