= Expansion chamber (disambiguation) =

An expansion chamber is an exhaust system used on a two-stroke cycle engine to enhance its power output by improving its volumetric efficiency.

Expansion chamber may also refer to:

- A large-scale expansion tank such as used in a pumping station, see Expansion tank#Larger systems.
- One of the essential components of the original and most common design of a condensation particle counter and similar instruments.
