= Ford Bronco II =

Compact sport utility vehicle manufactured by Ford

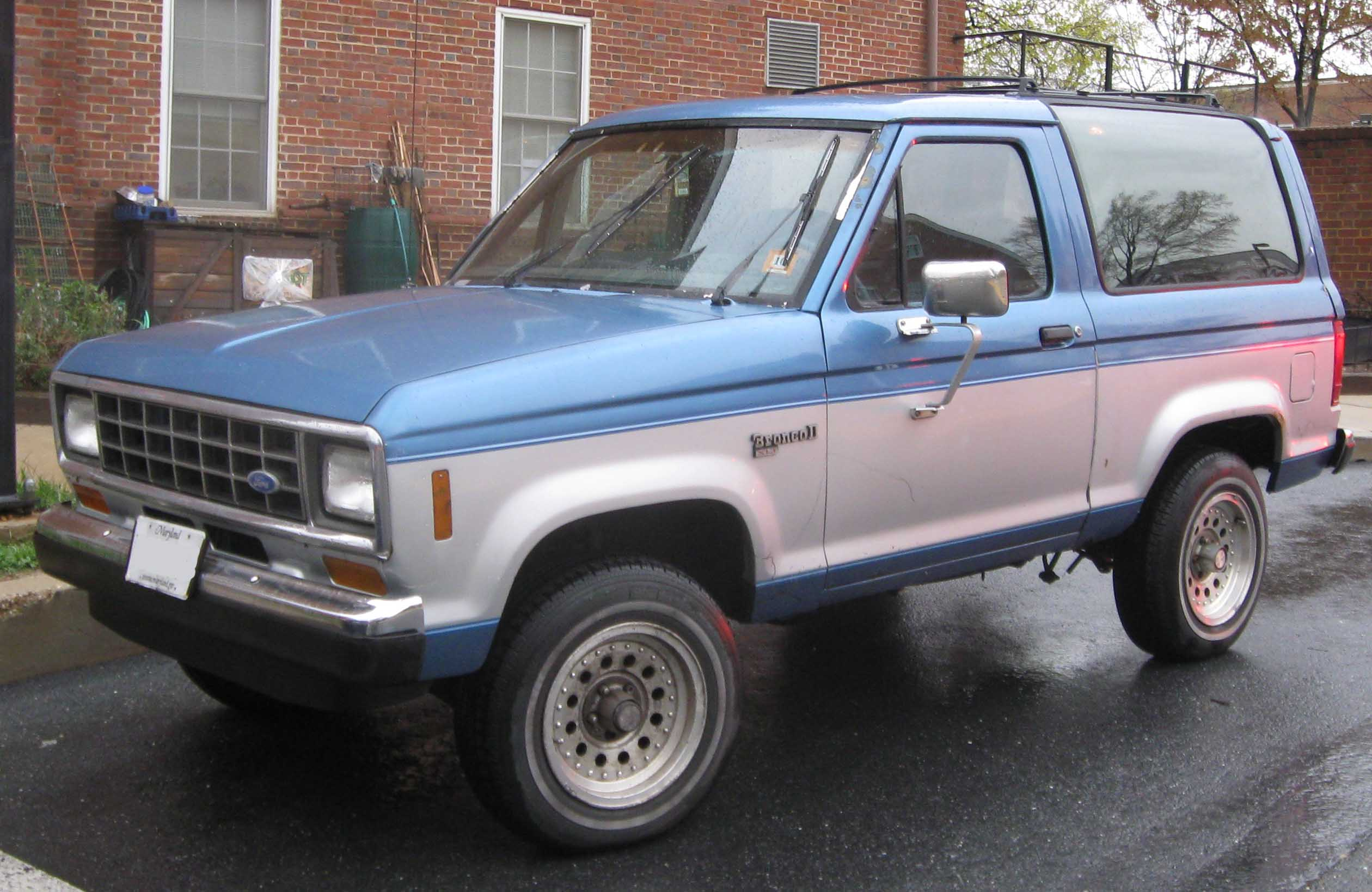
- 1983–1988 Ford Bronco II XLT

Overview
- Manufacturer: Ford
- Production: January 1983 – January 1990
- Model years: 1984–1990
- Assembly: United States: Louisville, Kentucky (Louisville Assembly)

Body and chassis
- Class: Compact SUV
- Body style: 3-door wagon
- Layout: Front engine, rear-wheel drive / four-wheel drive
- Chassis: Body-on-frame
- Related: Ford Ranger

Powertrain
- Engine: 2.8 L Cologne V6; 2.9 L Cologne V6; 2.3 L Mitsubishi 4D55T turbodiesel I4
- Transmission: Manual: 4-speed Mazda TK4; 5-speed Mazda TK5; 5-speed Mazda M5OD-R1; 5-speed Mitsubishi FM145; 5-speed Mitsubishi FM146; Automatic: 3-speed C5; 4-speed A4LD

Dimensions
- Wheelbase: 94.0 in (2,388 mm)
- Length: 1983–1988: 158.3 in (4,021 mm); 1989–1990: 161.9 in (4,112 mm)
- Width: 68.0 in (1,727 mm)
- Height: 1983–1988: 68.2 in (1,732 mm); 1989–1990: 69.9 in (1,775 mm)

Chronology
- Successor: Ford Explorer (three door)

The Ford Bronco II is a compact sport utility vehicle (SUV) that was manufactured by the American manufacturer Ford. Closely matching the first-generation Ford Bronco in size, the Bronco II was sold for the 1984 to 1990 model years, alongside the third and fourth generations of Ford's full-size Bronco. Derived from the Ford Ranger compact pickup truck, the Bronco II was produced in a single generation as a three-door wagon only, competing against the three-door version of the Jeep Cherokee introduced the same year, and the compact Chevrolet S-10 Blazer and GMC S-15 Jimmy which GM had launched as smaller, similar-named SUVs alongside their full-size Blazer and Jimmy a year prior.

For the 1991 model year, Ford replaced the Bronco II with a larger but still Ranger-derived SUV, the mid-size Explorer. Alongside a three-door wagon, a five-door version was also built to better meet consumer demands. Ford's next compact SUV was the 2001 Escape, available only as a five-door. Ford did not release another three-door SUV until the 2021 mid-size Bronco.

The Bronco II was assembled alongside the Ford Ranger in the Louisville Assembly Plant in Louisville, Kentucky from January 1983 to January 1990.

== History ==
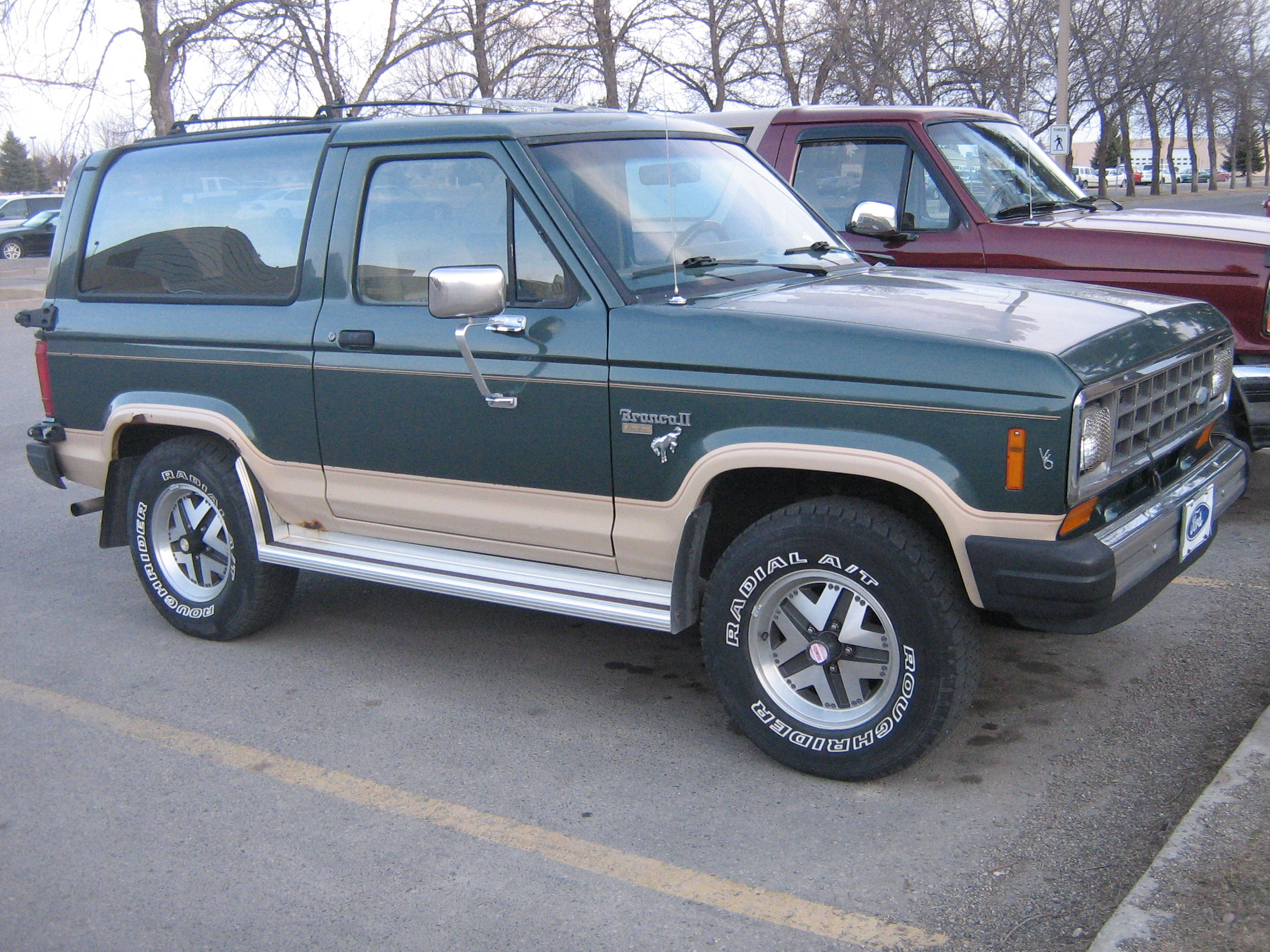
Ford Bronco II, Eddie Bauer trim

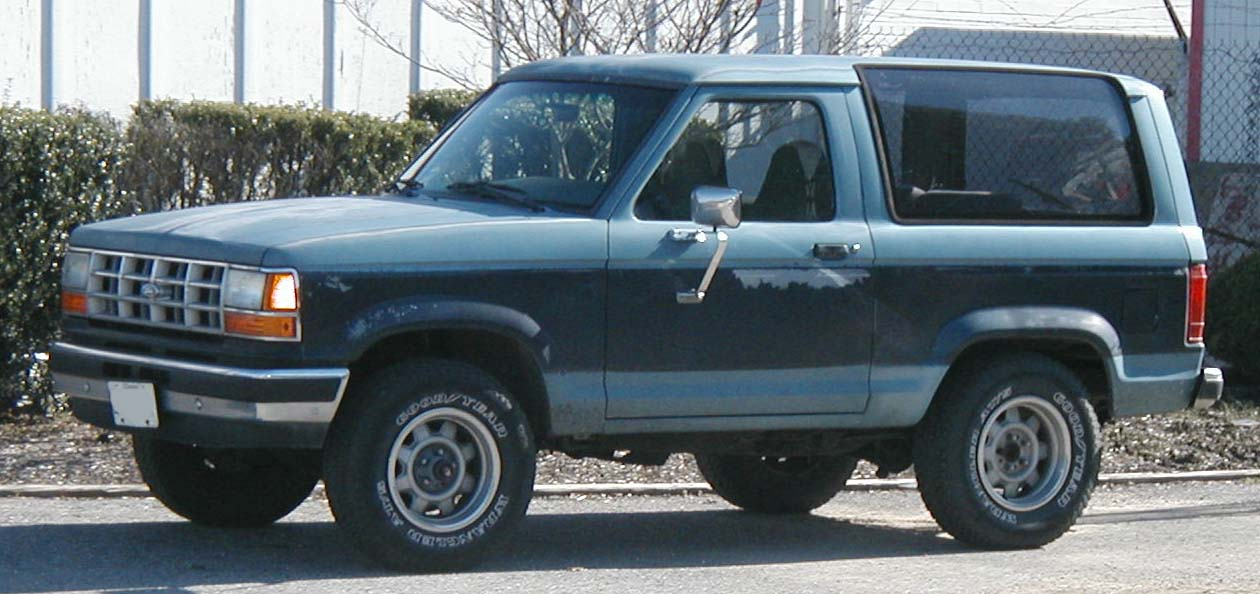
1989–1990 Ford Bronco II XLT

The first Bronco II was developed in parallel with the Ranger pickup truck that was introduced for the 1983 model year. Introduced in March 1983, Ford marketed the Bronco II as a "vehicle for men, single people, or young couples ... almost like John Wayne vehicles ... that gave people the sense that they could conquer anything ..." The Bronco II was nearly a foot shorter than the competing Chevrolet S-10 Blazer (introduced for the 1983 year), and the use of the Ranger chassis allowed for lower production costs by using a common assembly line with many shared components.

All Bronco IIs were four-wheel drive until 1986 when the rear-wheel-drive layout became standard. Rear-wheel-drive models were still equipped with a transfer case, capped or sealed where the front driveshaft was connected on four-wheel-drive versions.

=== 1989 update ===
For the 1989 model year, the Bronco II was restyled alongside the Ranger. The exterior featured new front bodywork with a new hood, front fenders, and a closer-fitting front bumper. Inside, the dashboard was redesigned, featuring a new instrument panel. Alongside the overall change in appearance, the new bodywork marked improvements in structural support. The 1989 Bronco II was short-lived as it was built for a little less than a year when production ended in early 1990. It was succeeded by the larger Ford Explorer for 1991.

As a running change, four-wheel drive 1990 models produced after November 1989 were produced with Dana 35 front axles, replacing the previous Dana 28 front axle.

== Engines ==
The 1984 and 1985 models were equipped with the German-built carbureted 2.8 L Cologne V6 with 115 hp (86 kW) at 4600 rpm, which was also used in the 1984 and 1985 Ford Ranger. It was originally available exclusively with four-wheel drive. The 1986 model year introduced the 140 hp (104 kW) fuel injected 2.9 L Cologne V6 engine.

A Mitsubishi 4-cylinder 2.3 L turbodiesel was optional during the 1986 & 1987 model years; however it delivered poor performance and had low sales.

== Discontinuation ==
Before the 1991 model year, the Bronco II was discontinued in February 1990, with its role in the Ford light-truck line largely taken over by the Ford Explorer. While the Explorer was also based upon the Ranger (to the point of also sharing parts of its interior with the Bronco II and Ranger), the Explorer was a mid-size SUV. Sized slightly larger than the S-10 Blazer, the five-door Explorer was nearly 23 inches (584 mm) longer than a 1990 Bronco II. As a more direct successor, a shorter-wheelbase three-door Explorer Sport was introduced (though still a foot longer than a Bronco II). The Explorer was solely powered by a 160 hp 4.0 L Cologne V6 engine shared with the Ranger and Ford Aerostar, no smaller engines were available.

The Explorer would be developed in parallel with the Ranger through its first generation until its major update in the 1995 to 2001 model years where it lost all its exterior styling shared with the Ranger.

== Safety controversy ==
Stability problems with Bronco II were noted during the design phase, as well as in the verification tests by 1981. For example, the J-turn test was canceled during the testing procedures by Ford officials "out of fear of killing or injuring one of its own drivers." Engineering modifications were suggested, but Ford officials declined the modifications because they would have delayed the marketing of the new vehicles. Eight months before production began, Ford's Office of General Counsel collected 113 documents concerning the new vehicle's handling problems. However, 53 of these test, simulation, and related reports about the stability of the Bronco II "disappeared" in an "unusual document handling procedure" that forebode the lawsuits against Ford starting in the late-1980s.

The Bronco II was dogged by reports that it was prone to rollovers. Some of the headlines in 1989-90 included "NHTSA Investigates Bronco II Rollovers," Automotive News (March 20, 1989) "Magazine Gives Ford's Bronco II 'Avoid' Rating," The Wall Street Journal (May 8, 1989), and "Consumer Reports Criticizes Ford Bronco II's Handling," The Washington Post (May 18, 1989).

After analysis of SUV crashes of the Suzuki Samurai, the U.S. National Highway Traffic Safety Administration (NHTSA) opened a formal study of the Ford Bronco II in 1989. There were 43 Bronco II rollover fatalities in 1987, compared with eight for the Samurai, but accident data in four states showed the Bronco II's rollover rate was similar to that of other SUVs, so the investigation was closed. NHTSA declined to reopen the investigation in 1997 after more Bronco II crashes.

It was estimated that 260 people had died in Bronco II rollover crashes, a rate that is several times more than in any similar vehicle according to the Insurance Institute for Highway Safety. By 1995, Ford had paid $113 million to settle 334 injury and wrongful death lawsuits. A class-action settlement with owners of its controversial Bronco II provided "new safety warnings and up to $200 for repairs and modifications." Ford ended production of the Bronco II in 1990, but "always contended that rollovers are overwhelmingly caused by bad driving or unsafe modifications to the vehicle."

Individual lawsuit examples include famed jockey Bill Shoemaker, that awarded him one million dollars. Shoemaker was paralyzed from the neck down after rolling his Bronco II in California in 1991 while intoxicated. Thereafter, he used a wheelchair. The largest award involving the Bronco II up to 1995 was a $62.4 million verdict for two passengers, one of whom who received brain injuries and left her in need of a legal guardian, after the 1986 model in which they were riding rolled over.

The safety record was "frightening" with "one in 500 Bronco II's ever produced [being] involved in a fatal rollover." Automobile insurer GEICO stopped writing insurance policies for the Bronco II. By 2001, Time magazine reported that the "notorious bucking Bronco II" rollover lawsuits had "cost the company approximately $2.4 billion in damage settlements."

One of the reasons for the significant losses by the automaker was a deal Ford made with a former engineer, David Bickerstaff. He worked on the Bronco II and had published SAE reports about Ford truck suspensions. In 1990, Bickerstaff testified in court that the Bronco II had a dangerously low stability index. His credibility was questioned by attorneys.
