= Decompression =

Decompression has several meanings, some of which are covered by several articles:

- Data decompression, the action of reversing data compression
- Decompression (physics), the release of pressure and the opposition of physical compression
  - Decompression (altitude). the reduction of pressure and the related physiological effects due to increase in altitude or other equivalent reduction of ambient pressure below normal atmospheric pressure
  - Decompression (diving), the reduction in pressure and the process of allowing dissolved inert gases to be eliminated from the tissues during ascent from a dive or while in a pressurised environment
    - Decompression practice, the techniques and procedures for decompressing a diver
    - Decompression theory, The study of safe and efficient decompression practice
  - Uncontrolled decompression, catastrophic reduction of pressure in accidents involving pressure vessels such as aircraft
- Decompression (comics), in comic book storytelling, is the stylistic choice to tell a story mainly by visuals, with few words.
- Decompression (novel), a 2012 novel by Juli Zeh
- Decompression (surgery), a procedure used to reduce pressure on a compressed structure, such as spinal decompression
  - Herniated disc decompression, a form of treatment for Spinal disc herniation, employed by chiropractors
- "Decompression" (The Outer Limits), an episode of the American television fiction series The Outer Limits
- Nerve decompression, a procedure to relieve direct pressure on a nerve
- Decompression sickness
