= Chevrolet Tahoe =

American sport utility vehicle

Chevrolet Tahoe GMC Yukon
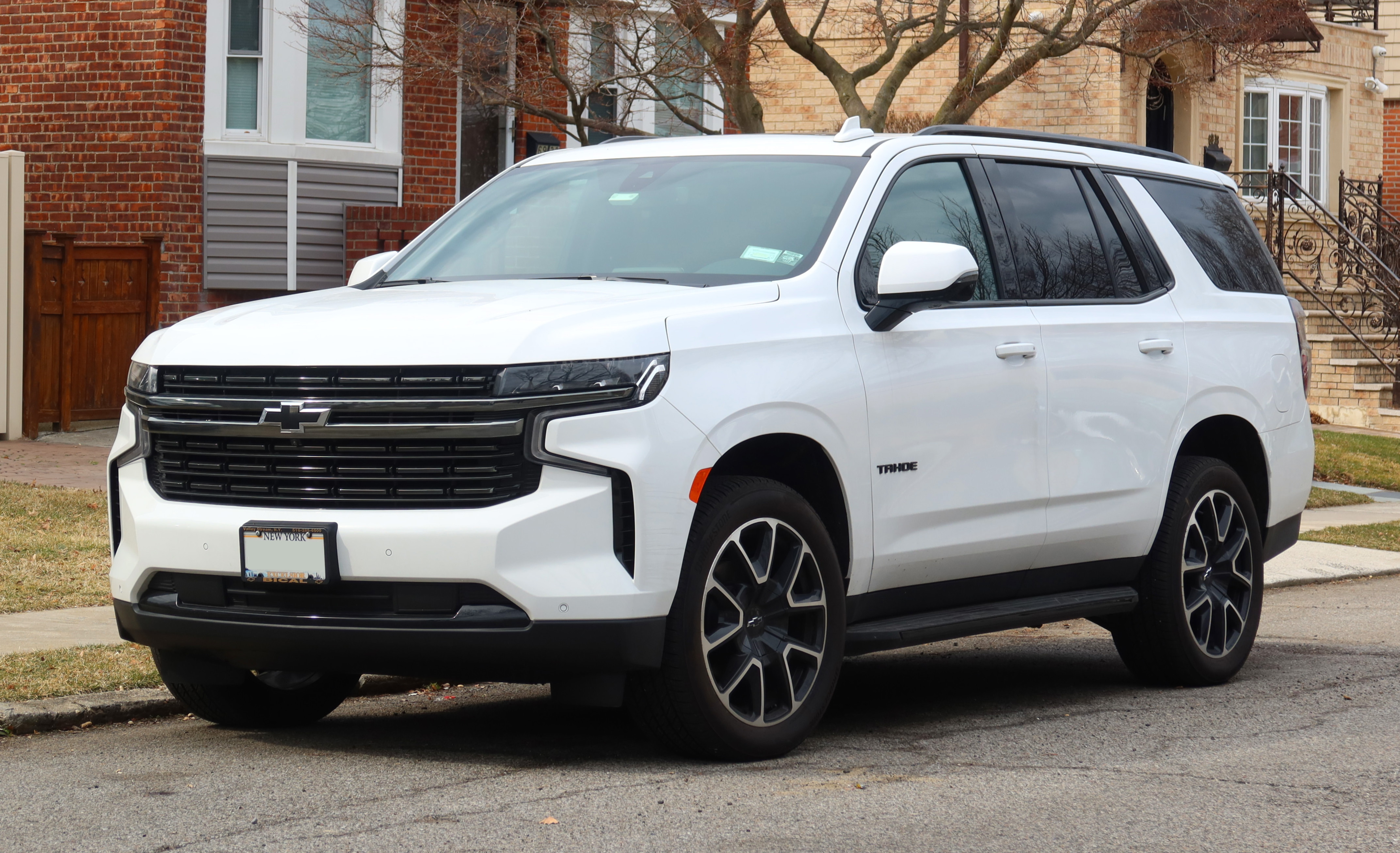
- 2022 Chevrolet Tahoe RST (fifth generation)

Overview
- Manufacturer: General Motors
- Production: 1991–present (Yukon); 1994–present (Tahoe)

Body and chassis
- Class: Full-size SUV
- Layout: Front-engine, rear-wheel-drive / four-wheel-drive
- Chassis: Body-on-frame
- Related: Cadillac Escalade; Chevrolet Suburban/GMC Yukon XL; Chevrolet Silverado/GMC Sierra; Hummer H2

Chronology
- Predecessor: Chevrolet K5 Blazer/GMC K5 Jimmy

The Chevrolet Tahoe (/ˈtɑːhoʊ/) is a line of full-size SUVs from Chevrolet, marketed since the 1995 model year. Marketed alongside the GMC Yukon for its entire production, the Tahoe is the successor to the Chevrolet K5 Blazer, while the Yukon replaced the full-sized GMC Jimmy. Both trucks derive their nameplates from Western North America, with Tahoe referring to Lake Tahoe and Yukon referring to the Canadian Yukon.

Initially produced as a three-door SUV wagon, a five-door wagon body was introduced for 1995, ultimately replacing the three-door body entirely. The five-door wagon shares its body with the Chevrolet and GMC Suburban (the latter variant of which is now known as the GMC Yukon XL) as a shorter-wheelbase variant. Since 1998, the Tahoe has served as the basis of the standard-wheelbase GMC Yukon Denali and Cadillac Escalade luxury SUVs. The Tahoe is sold in North America, parts of Asia such as the Philippines, as well as the Middle East, Russia, and other countries including Bolivia, Chile, Peru, Colombia, Ecuador, and Angola as a left-hand-drive vehicle. The Yukon is only sold in North America and the Middle East.

The Tahoe has regularly been the best-selling full-size SUV in the United States, frequently outselling its competition by two to one.

== Nameplate origin ==
For 1983, General Motors introduced its first mid-size SUVs, which shared the same model names as their full-size counterparts. The S-10 Blazer and GMC S-15 Jimmy were identified by a model prefix, with the K5 Blazer/Jimmy now identified as "Full-Size" versions. From 1987 to 1991, the K prefix was changed to V, as K was moved to the GMT400 platform.

To reduce confusion, GMC renamed its full-size SUV the Yukon for 1992, leaving the Jimmy name exclusive to the mid-size model. Chevrolet followed suit in 1995, with Tahoe replacing the full-size Blazer alongside the Yukon.

== First generation (1992) ==
GMT400
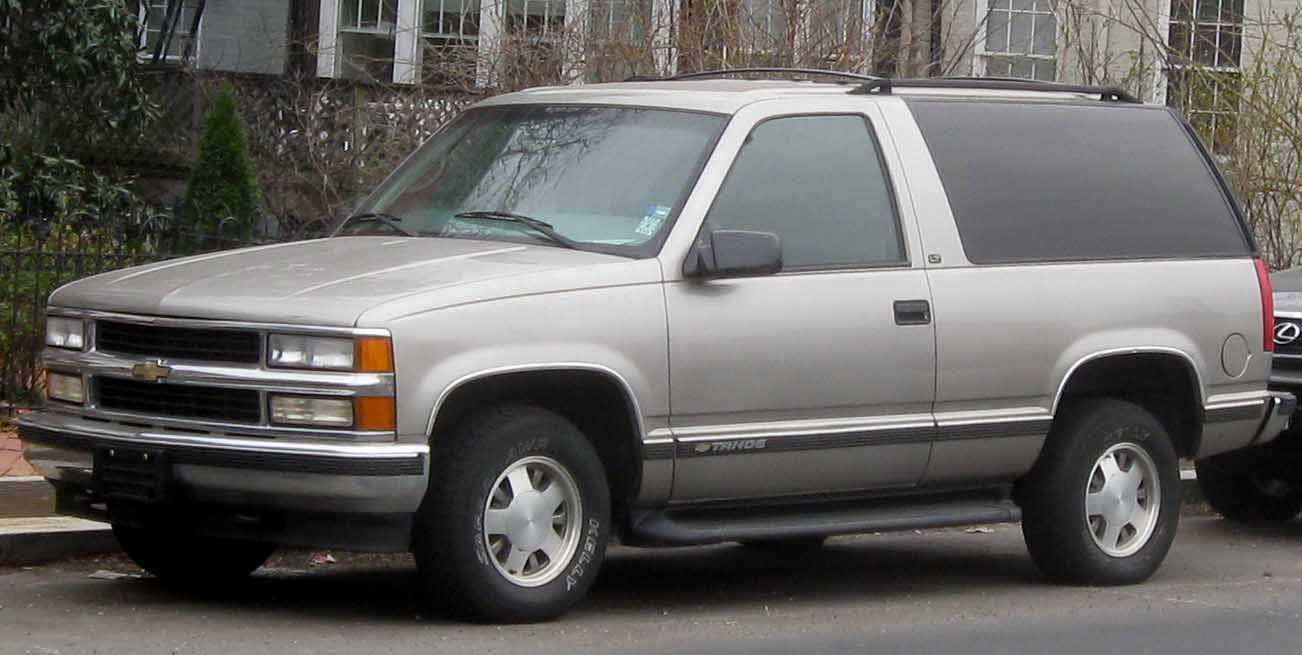
- 1997–1999 Chevrolet Tahoe (2-door)

Overview
- Also called: GMC Yukon; Chevrolet Grand Blazer (Argentina, Brazil, Chile, Colombia, Ecuador, and Venezuela); Chevrolet Silverado 2 & 4 doors (Mexico)
- Production: 2-door models: GMC Yukon: late 1991 – July 1997; Chevrolet Tahoe: early 1995 – May 1999; 4-door models: January 1995 – June 2000
- Model years: 1992–2000 (Yukon); 1995–2000 (Tahoe)
- Assembly: United States: Arlington, Texas; Janesville, Wisconsin; Mexico: Silao, Guanajuato; Argentina: Córdoba; Venezuela: Valencia, Carabobo
- Designer: Chuck Jordan (Blazer: 1988); Wayne Cherry (Blazer facelift/Tahoe: 1992)

Body and chassis
- Body style: 2-door SUV; 4-door SUV
- Platform: GMT420/430
- Related: Chevrolet/GMC Suburban

Powertrain
- Engine: Gasoline: 4.1 L MPFI (Brazil); 5.7 L L05/L31 V8; Diesel: 4.2 L MWM Sprint turbo (Brazil); 6.5 L Detroit Diesel L56 turbo V8
- Transmission: 4-speed 4L60E automatic 4-speed 4L80E automatic 5-speed HM290 manual 5-speed NV3500 manual 5-speed NV4500 manual

Dimensions
- Wheelbase: 2-door: 111.5 in (2,832 mm); 4-door: 117.5 in (2,984 mm)
- Length: 188 in (4,775 mm) (2-door); 199 in (5,055 mm) (4-door)
- Width: 77 in (1,956 mm)
- Height: 72 in (1,829 mm)
- Curb weight: 4,500 lb (2,000 kg) (3-door); 5,500 lb (2,500 kg) (5/6-door)

For 1992, General Motors redesigned its full-size SUV lines, moving from the Rounded-Line C/K chassis to the GMT400 architecture first introduced for 1988. While the five-door Suburban wagon only underwent a generational transition, the full-size Blazer underwent extensive design changes. No longer a half-cab pickup truck, the model line became a three-door version of the Suburban. In the change of its body configuration, the Blazer saw it removable hardtop replaced by a full-length fixed steel roof. The previous retractable-glass tailgate was replaced by a tailgate with a liftgate rear window. Along with improving rollover safety and reducing water and air leaks, the bodywork changes increased component commonality between both three-door wagons and the five-door Suburban.

In addition, the three-door SUVs underwent a series of branding changes. To reduce the branding confusion between full-size and mid-size GMC SUVs, the two divisions phased its traditional nameplates towards its mid-size SUV lines. GMC reintroduced the full-size Jimmy as the GMC Yukon, with the full-size Blazer nameplate retained by Chevrolet (and renamed Chevrolet Blazer for 1993). For 1995, the division renamed the Blazer as the Chevrolet Tahoe.

For 1995, alongside the introduction of the Chevrolet Tahoe and the five-door body (see below), the entire GMT400 model family underwent a mid-cycle revision. Following a 1994 update of the grille, the interior received a more substantial revision, including a redesigned dashboard (including a redesigned instrument cluster and a driver-side airbag); the Tahoe also adopted the folding side mirrors of the Suburban.

1996 saw several revisions to the driveline, as the 5.7L V8 became the Vortec 5700 engine (following internal engineering revisions for increased output and fuel economy). Three-door wagons saw the return of available rear-wheel drive (for the first time since 1991) and push-button shifting was introduced for the 4x4 transfer case. Daytime running lights became introduced as a standard feature. The Mexican-market Chevrolet Silverado received its own front grille (fitting a Chevrolet emblem to a GMC grille).

For 1997, the dashboard was upgraded with dual airbags. Along with revisions to the automatic transmission (the five-speed manual was dropped after 1995), the power steering was upgraded to a speed-sensitive design. The Z56 police-package option for Tahoe (see below) introduced to replace the discontinued Caprice 9C1.

1998 saw further upgrades to the model line. Alongside additional updates to the transmission, the part-time 4x4 system was replaced by "AutoTrac". Along with the traditional high and low range four-wheel drive, the system also featured an automatic mode that engaged traction to the front axle only when the transfer case detected wheel slippage. Several functional features debuted, including a Homelink transmitter (integrating garage door openers and similar devices into several console pushbuttons) and the introduction of the PassLock key-based security system. Along with heated front seats, rear-seat air conditioning was introduced as an option. GMC introduced the Yukon Denali as the flagship SUV for General Motors.

For 1999, the Tahoe/Yukon were largely carryover, with the Cadillac Escalade introduced as a counterpart of the Yukon Denali. Following the debut of the GMT800 architecture for 2000, only the Yukon Denali, Cadillac Escalade, and the Tahoe Limited/Z71 (see below) were produced.

=== Powertrain details ===
The standard engine for the Blazer/Tahoe and the Yukon is a 350 cu in (5.7 L) small-block V8. In 1994, a 6.5 L (395 cu in) Detroit Diesel turbodiesel V8 became an option. Offered only with three-door 4x4s, the 6.5L was detuned to 360 lb⋅ft (488 N⋅m) torque to accommodate the rear axle capacity of the 1500-series Tahoe. For 1996, the 5.7L engine became the Vortec 5700, reflecting design upgrades to power output and fuel economy.

Transmissions included a four-speed automatic and five-speed manual; the latter transmission was only offered on two-door 4WD models and was discontinued after 1995.

Year	Engine	Power	Torque	RPO Code	VIN Code (8th Digit)	Notes
1992–1995	5.7 L 350 TBI V8	200 hp (149 kW)	310 lb⋅ft (420 N⋅m)	L05	K	
1994–1999	6.5 L Detroit Diesel Turbo V8	180 hp (134 kW)	360 lb⋅ft (488 N⋅m)	L56	S	Two-door 4WD models only
1996–2000	5.7 L Vortec 5700 V8	255 hp (190 kW)	335 lb⋅ft (454 N⋅m)	L31	R	

=== Five-door body (1995–2000) ===
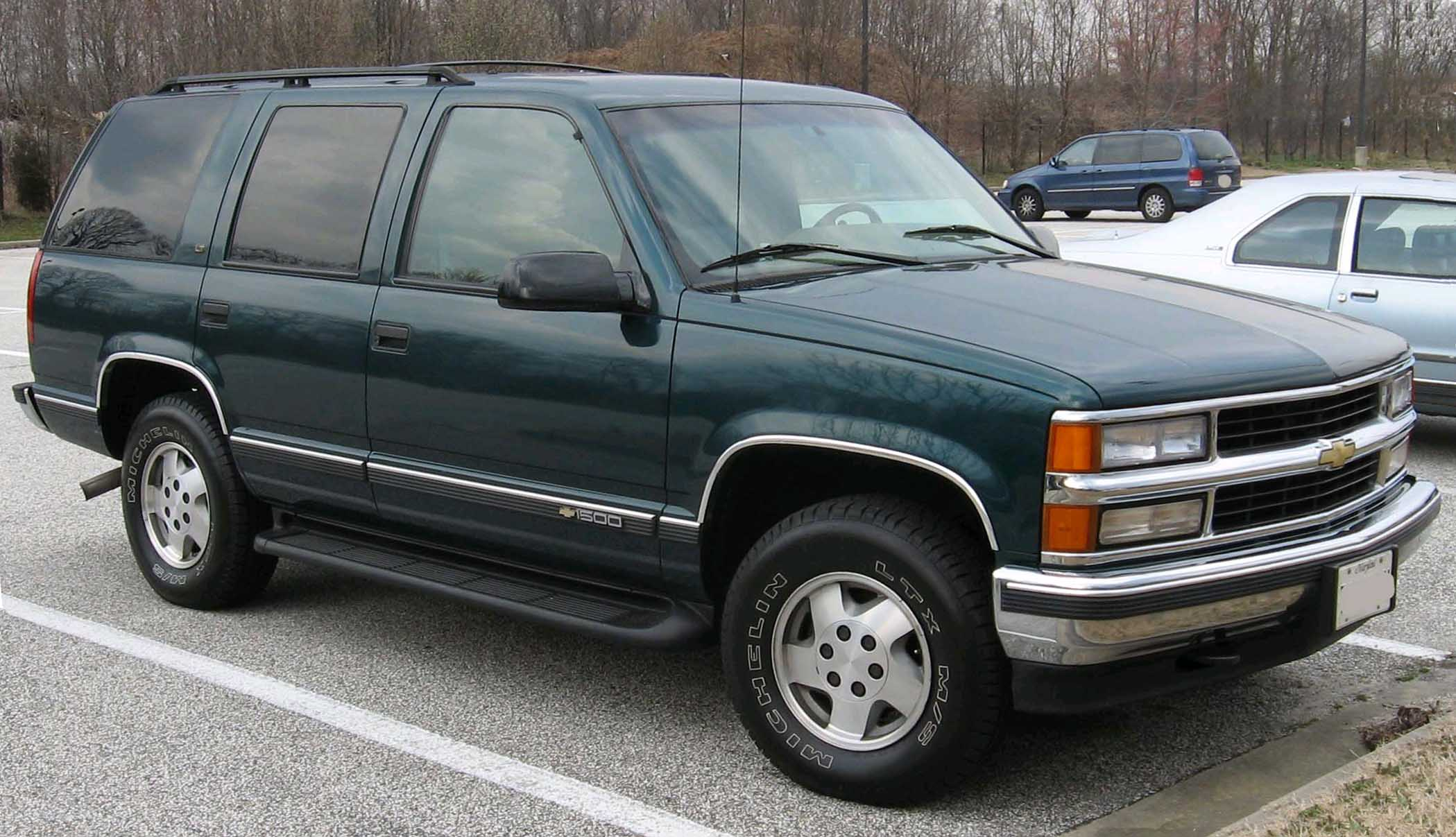
1995-1996 Chevrolet Tahoe LT (199.0 inches)

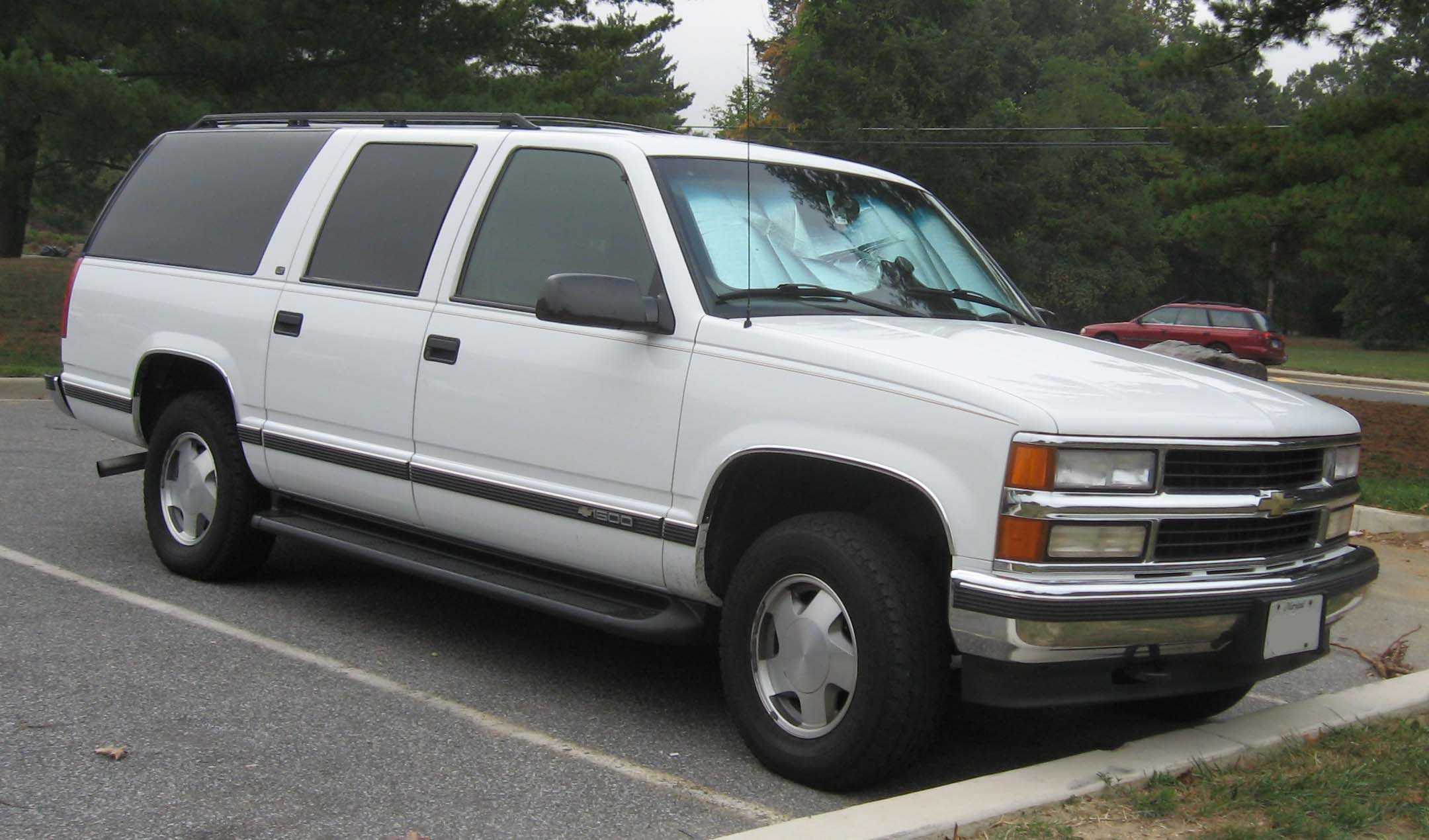
Chevrolet Suburban LT (219.5 inches)

For 1995, alongside the debut of the Chevrolet Tahoe nameplate, GM introduced a five-door variant of the model line. A response to the overall decline of three-door SUVs (of all sizes), the five-door Tahoe/Yukon bridged the size gap between the mid-size Blazer/Jimmy and the larger Suburban wagons. To accommodate the second set of doors, the body was stretched six inches in wheelbase and 11 inches in length (remaining 12 inches shorter in wheelbase and 20 inches shorter in length than the Suburban).

Visually, the five-door Tahoe/Yukon differed from the Suburban primarily with its shorter rear overhang and narrower cargo-area window; the vehicle was not offered with a third-row seat. The rear doors of the Tahoe/Yukon are notched at the bottom to accommodate the rear wheel well (on the Suburban, they extend to the rocker panel). In addition to the split rear tailgate, the five-door body was also offered with the split-panel doors from the Suburban (a rare feature on the three-door Tahoe/Yukon).

Five-door Yukon and Tahoe production started on January 20, 1995, at Janesville Assembly. The Tahoe was named Motor Trend magazine's Truck of the Year for 1996. The Yukon Denali and the Cadillac Escalade, introduced for 1999, used the five-door wagon body exclusively.

=== Chevrolet Tahoe ===
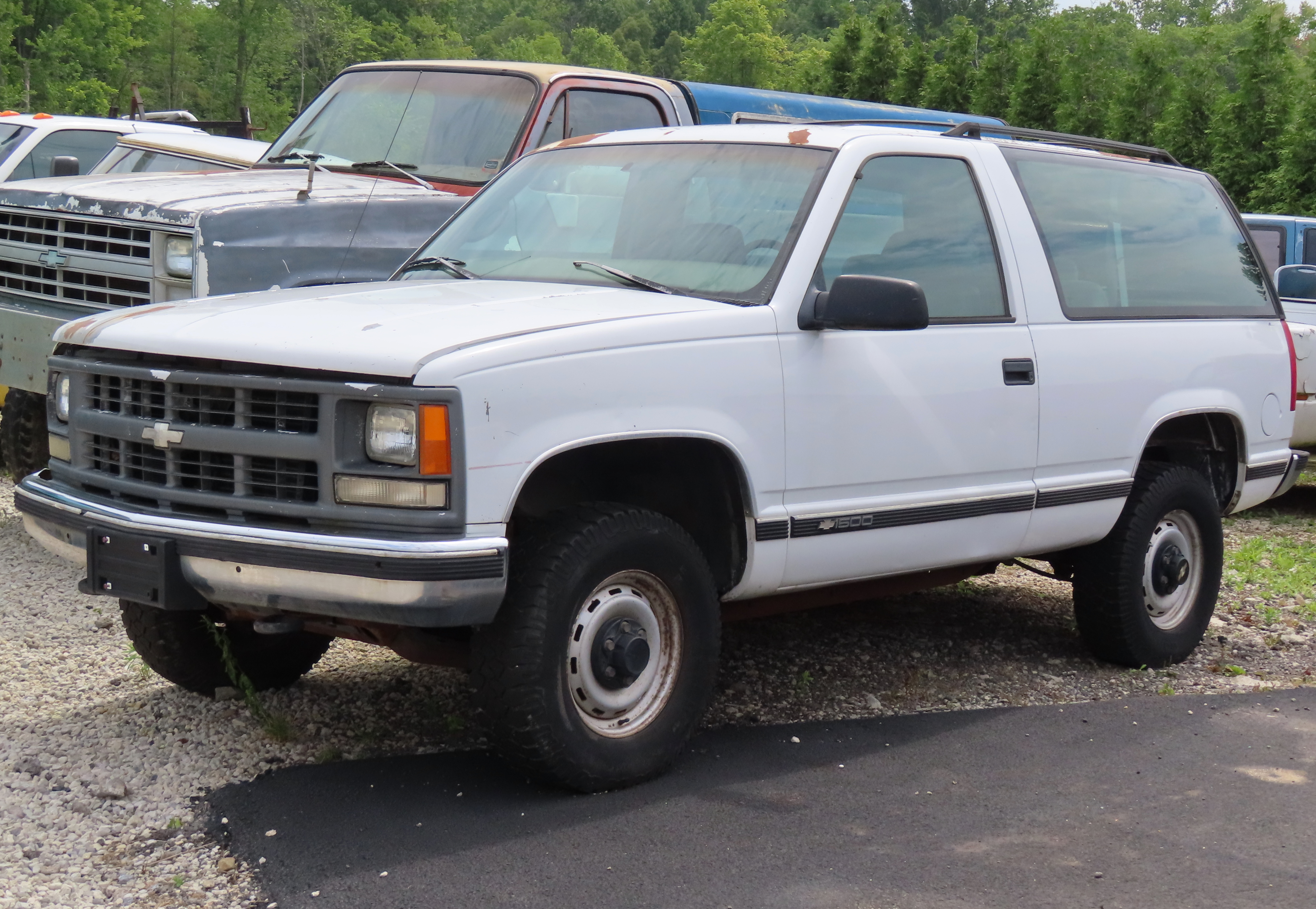
1997 Chevrolet Tahoe (base trim), with sealed-beam headlights.

Following suit with the 1992 introduction of the GMC Yukon (see below), Chevrolet renamed the full-size Blazer for 1995, giving the previous nameplate to the mid-size line. Coinciding with the introduction of the five-door wagon, the Tahoe was also offered as a three-door SUV wagon.

In place of the Blazer sharing its base, Cheyenne, and Silverado trims with the pickup truck, the Tahoe was offered with base (similar to a W/T-package truck), LS, and LT trims; these ended production after the 1999 model year.

After the 1999 model year, Chevrolet ended production of the three-door Tahoe; as of current production, only the five-door wagon has been produced ever since.

==== Tahoe Limited and Tahoe Z71 ====
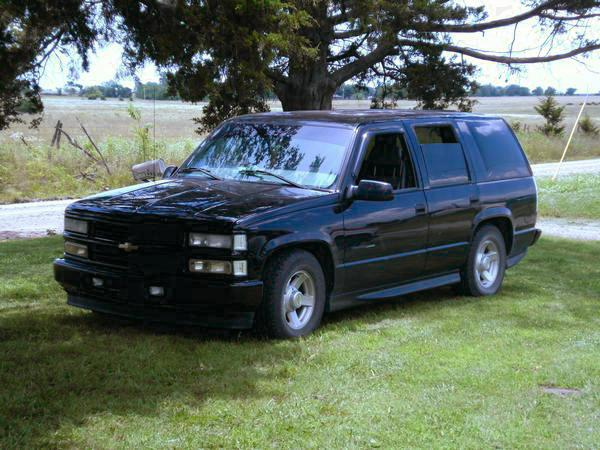
2000 Chevrolet Tahoe Limited

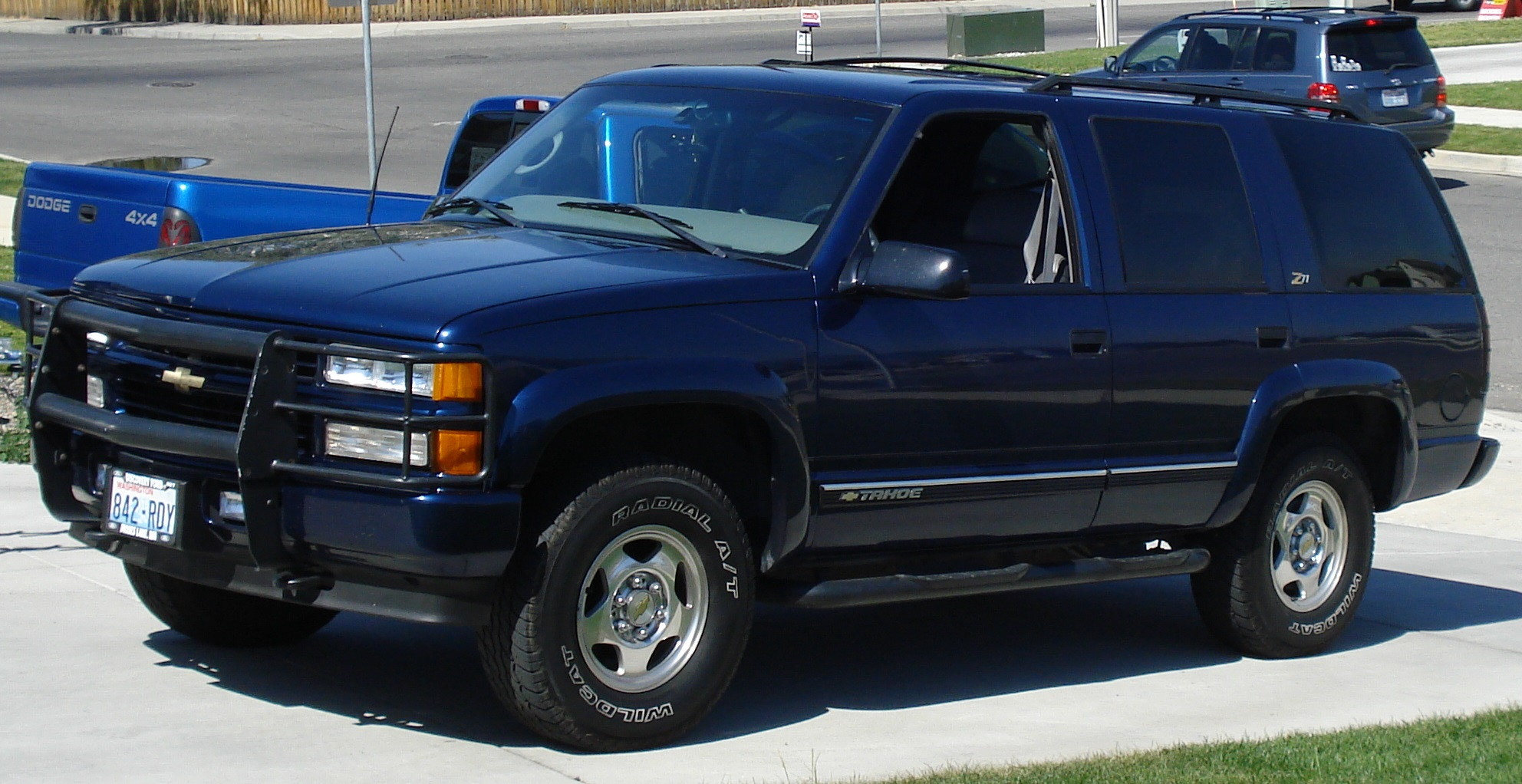
2000 Chevrolet Tahoe Z71 Special Edition

For 2000, Chevrolet produced the GMT400-generation Tahoe as two special-edition vehicles: the rear-wheel drive Tahoe Limited and the 4x4 Tahoe Z71. These vehicles were all assembled at the Arlington Assembly facility. Largely appearance packages, the two vehicles have several notable chassis upgrades; the 5.7L V8 remained unmodified (alongside the 4L60E transmission).

The Chevrolet Tahoe Limited is an on-road oriented vehicle intended as a production version of the 1996 Chevrolet Tahoe SS concept vehicle (the Super Sport moniker fell out of favor with GM when insurance companies were demanding higher insurance premiums for SUVs). In line with the 454SS pickup trucks, the Tahoe Limited was painted nearly monochromatic in Onyx Black. The chassis borrowed several components from the Z60 option package (RWD police package), lowering the chassis two inches, adding a limited-slip rear differential (3.42:1 or optional 3.73:1 rear axle ratio), engine oil cooling system, and 46 mm (1.8 in) Bilstein shock absorbers. A factory-fitted ground effects package matching the body in color integrated fog lamps into the front bumper and color-matched the grille; the roof rack was also deleted. To accommodate the wider 255/70R16 tires, the Limited was fitted with 16-inch Ronal R36 five-spoke aluminum wheels. The interior was fitted with two-tone gray/charcoal leather seats, with the instrument cluster adopting a 120mph speedometer.

The Chevrolet Tahoe Z71 is an off-road oriented vehicle that took its name from the off-road chassis package introduced for K-series pickups in 1989. Taking the Bilstein shock absorbers from the pickup-truck Z71 package and the G80 locking differential (3.73:1 rear axle ratio), the Tahoe Z71 was fitted with underbody skid plates, an oversized two-row radiator, and inset driving lights centered in the front bumper. In line with its off-road intentions, the Z71 also includes a black brushguard, black tubular step bars, and taillamp lens protectors. The tires were fitted on 16-inch Alcoa five-spoke six-lug polished aluminum wheels. As with the Limited, the Z71 was fitted with a two-tone leather interior. In place of Onyx Black, the Tahoe Z71 was offered in either Light Pewter Metallic, Victory Red, Emerald Green Metallic, or Indigo Blue Metallic in a monochromatic appearance. Similar to the Limited, the Z71 was fitted with color-keyed wheel flares, grille, bumpers, and body trim.

=== GMC Yukon ===
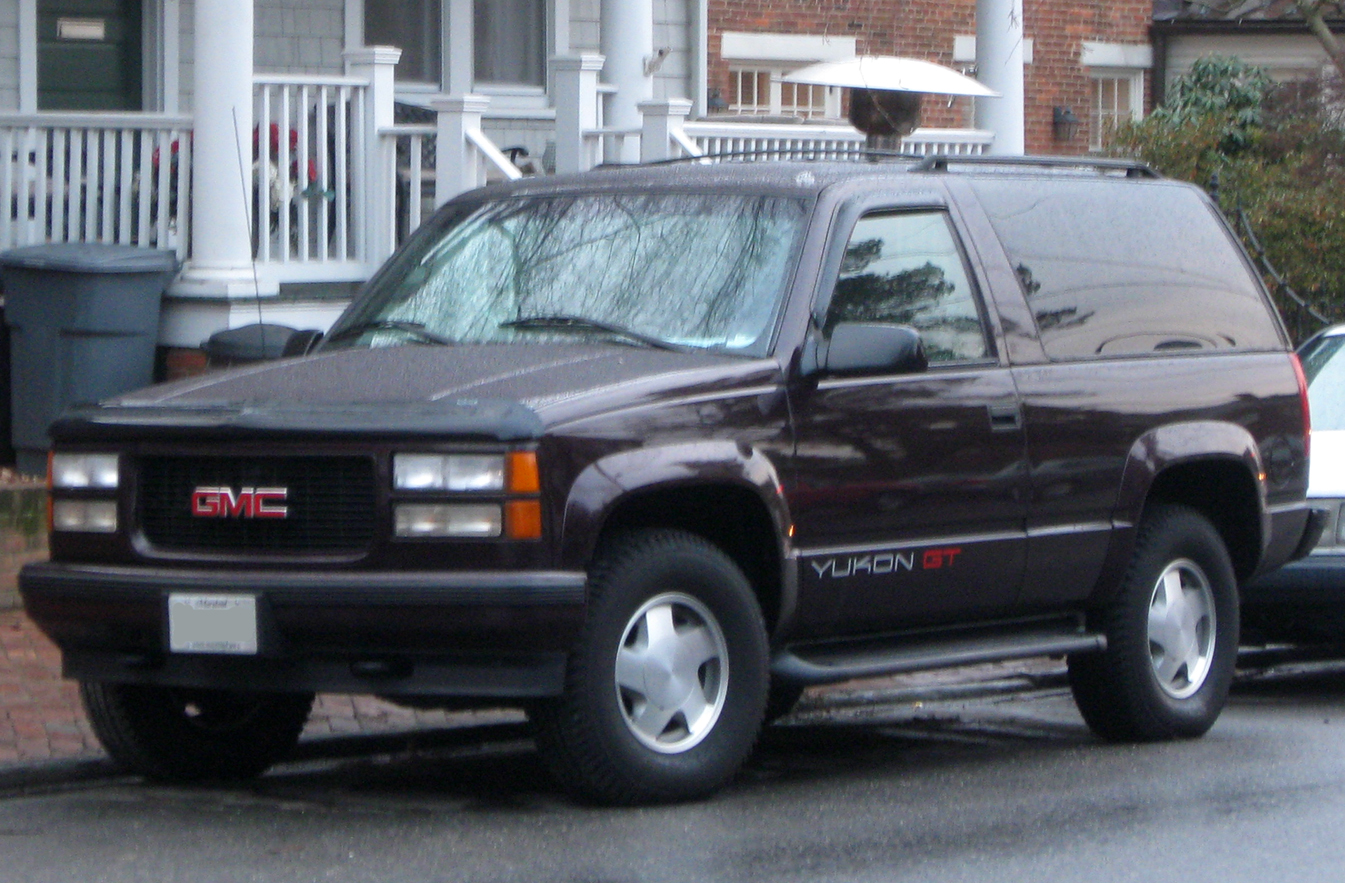
1994 GMC Yukon GT

For 1992, GMC renamed the full-size Jimmy as the GMC Yukon, giving the previous nameplate to its mid-size SUV. Sharing its bodywork with both the GMC Suburban and the GMC Sierra 1500, the Yukon was a divisional counterpart of the Chevrolet Blazer.

In line with the Sierra pickup truck, GMC offered the Yukon in base, SLE, and SLT trims. From 1992 to 1994, a flagship Yukon GT was offered. Styled with a body-color grille, front and rear bumpers, the GT featured "Yukon GT" names on both doors and bucket seats with a center console.

The three-door Yukon was retired after 1997, leaving only the five-door Yukon wagon.

==== GMC Yukon Denali ====
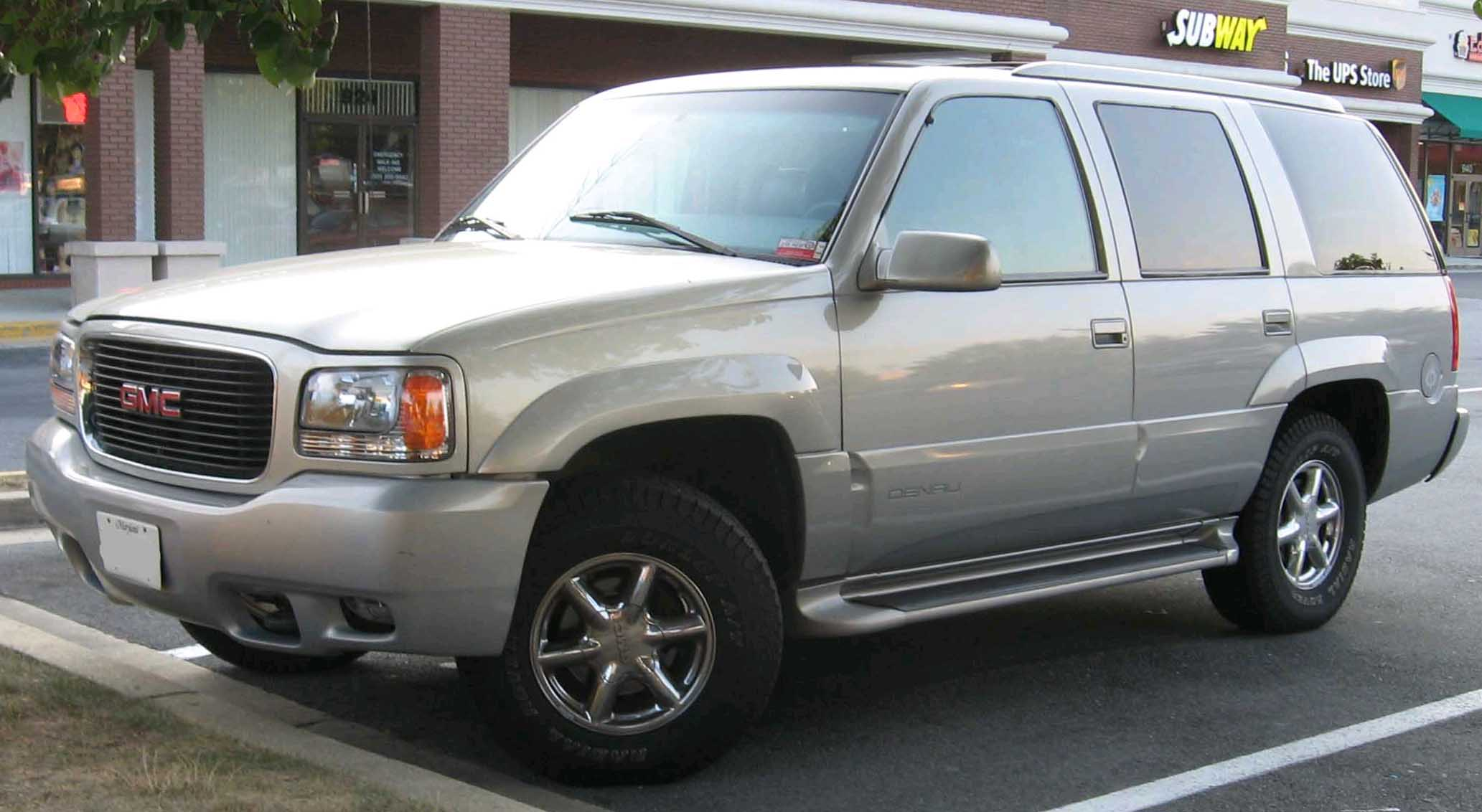
GMT400 GMC Yukon Denali

For 1998, GMC introduced the Yukon Denali luxury SUV. The inaugural model of its Denali sub-brand, the Yukon Denali was initially the flagship SUV of General Motors, competing against the larger Lincoln Navigator. While sharing much of its body with the standard Yukon, the Denali was fitted with new bodywork forward of the windshield and new lower body cladding. The interior underwent extensive upgrades, featuring upgraded leather and woodgrain trim, and a Bose stereo system (cassette/CD changer).

==== Cadillac Escalade ====
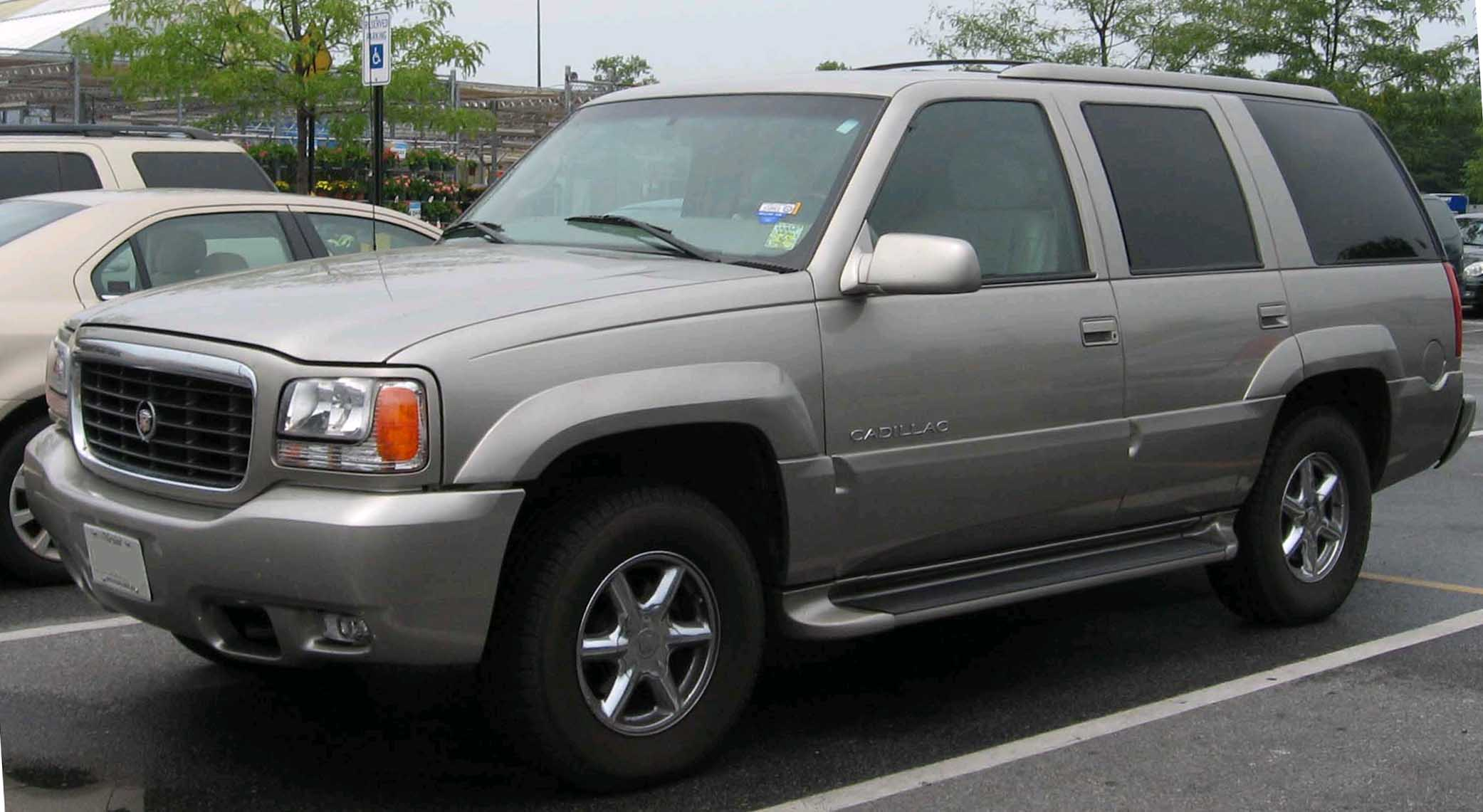
GMT400 Cadillac Escalade

For 1999, GM also introduced the Yukon Denali as the Cadillac Escalade to give its flagship brand its own luxury SUV. While sharing a nearly identical exterior with the Yukon Denali (differing only in badging and grille design), the Escalade was fitted with additional Zebrano wood trim, redesigned front and rear seats (with perforated leather). As OnStar was standard (optional on the Denali), only two options were available for the Escalade: the rear door configuration (split tailgate or Suburban-style barn doors) and a center-console cellular telephone (dealer installed).

Both flagship SUVs (and the Tahoe Limited/Z71) used the GMT400 body for 2000 as the remainder of the GM light-truck line adopted the GMT800 architecture.

=== Outside North America ===
In Mexico, the two-door Tahoe was released in 1995, called the Chevrolet Silverado, and in 1998, the four-door model was released as the Silverado four-door. Both models were available with the Base, LS, or luxury LT trim packages. In Venezuela, the two-door Tahoe was released in 1993 (4WD only), called the Chevrolet Grand Blazer, and in 1996, the four-door model was released as the Grand Blazer four-door (2WD). In 1996, the two-door was discontinued and only the Grand Blazer four-door 4WD was available. In Bolivia, the four-door model was released in 1995 as the Tahoe four-door (4WD).

== Second generation (2000) ==
GMT800
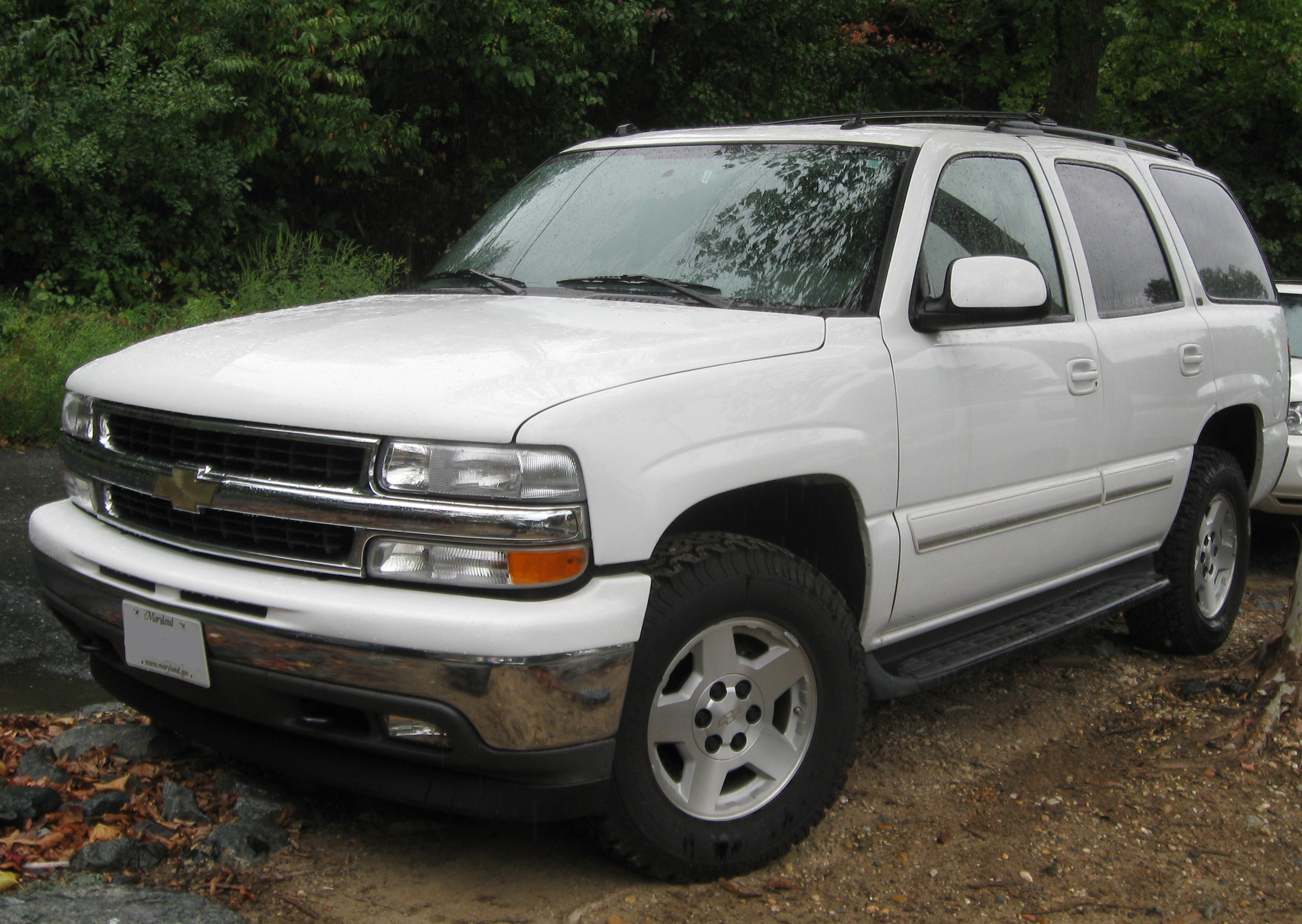
- 2004–2006 Chevrolet Tahoe

Overview
- Also called: GMC Yukon; Chevrolet Sonora (Mexico); Chevrolet Tahoe Police Package
- Production: November 1999 – December 2005
- Model years: 2000–2006
- Assembly: United States: Janesville, Wisconsin; Arlington, Texas; Mexico: Silao, Guanajuato; Russia: Kaliningrad, Kaliningrad Oblast
- Designer: Wayne Cherry, Ken Sohocki (1996)

Body and chassis
- Body style: 4-door SUV
- Platform: GM GMT800 platform
- Related: Chevrolet Suburban; GMC Yukon XL; Cadillac Escalade; Hummer H2

Powertrain
- Engine: 4.8 L 275 hp (205 kW) Vortec 4800 V8; 5.3 L 285 hp (213 kW) Vortec 5300 V8; 5.7 L 255 hp (190 kW) V8 (Mexico only); 6.0 L Vortec 6000 (Yukon Denali)
- Transmission: 4-speed 4L60-E automatic

Dimensions
- Wheelbase: 116.0 in (2,946 mm)
- Length: 1999–01 Tahoe & 1999–06 Yukon & Denali: 198.9 in (5,052 mm); 2001–03 Tahoe: 196.9 in (5,001 mm); 2003–06 Tahoe: 198.8 in (5,050 mm)
- Width: 78.9 in (2,004 mm)
- Height: 74.2–76.7 in (1885–1948 mm)
- Curb weight: 5,302 lb (2,405 kg)

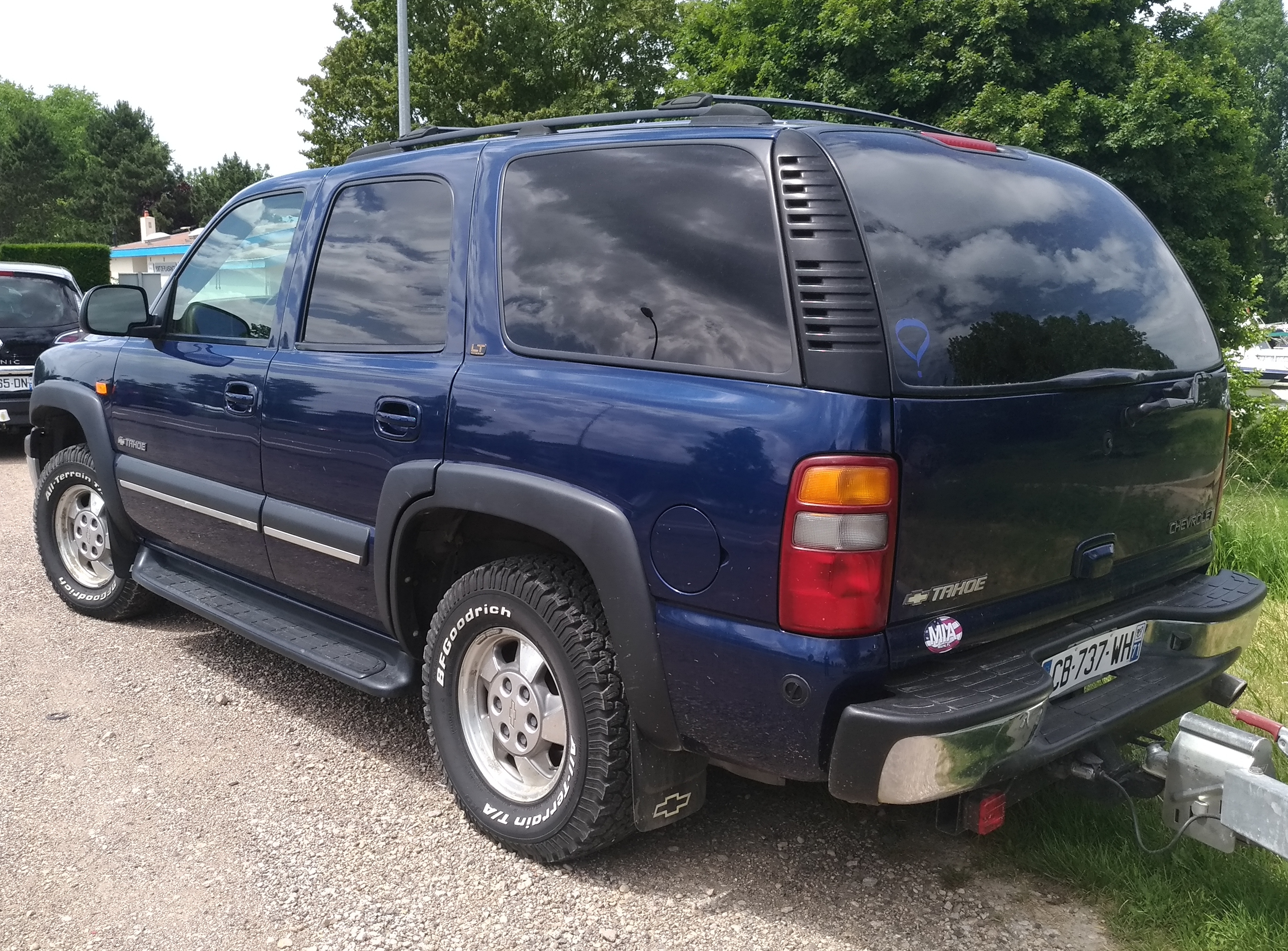
Chevrolet Tahoe rear view

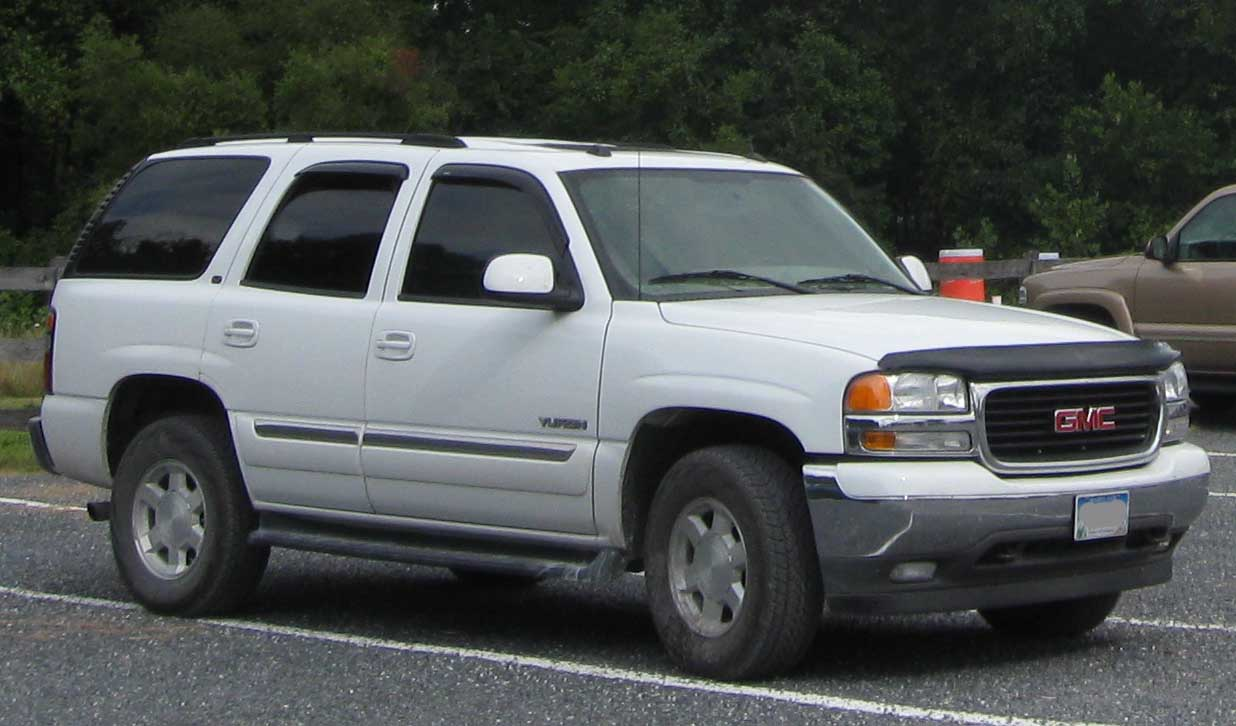
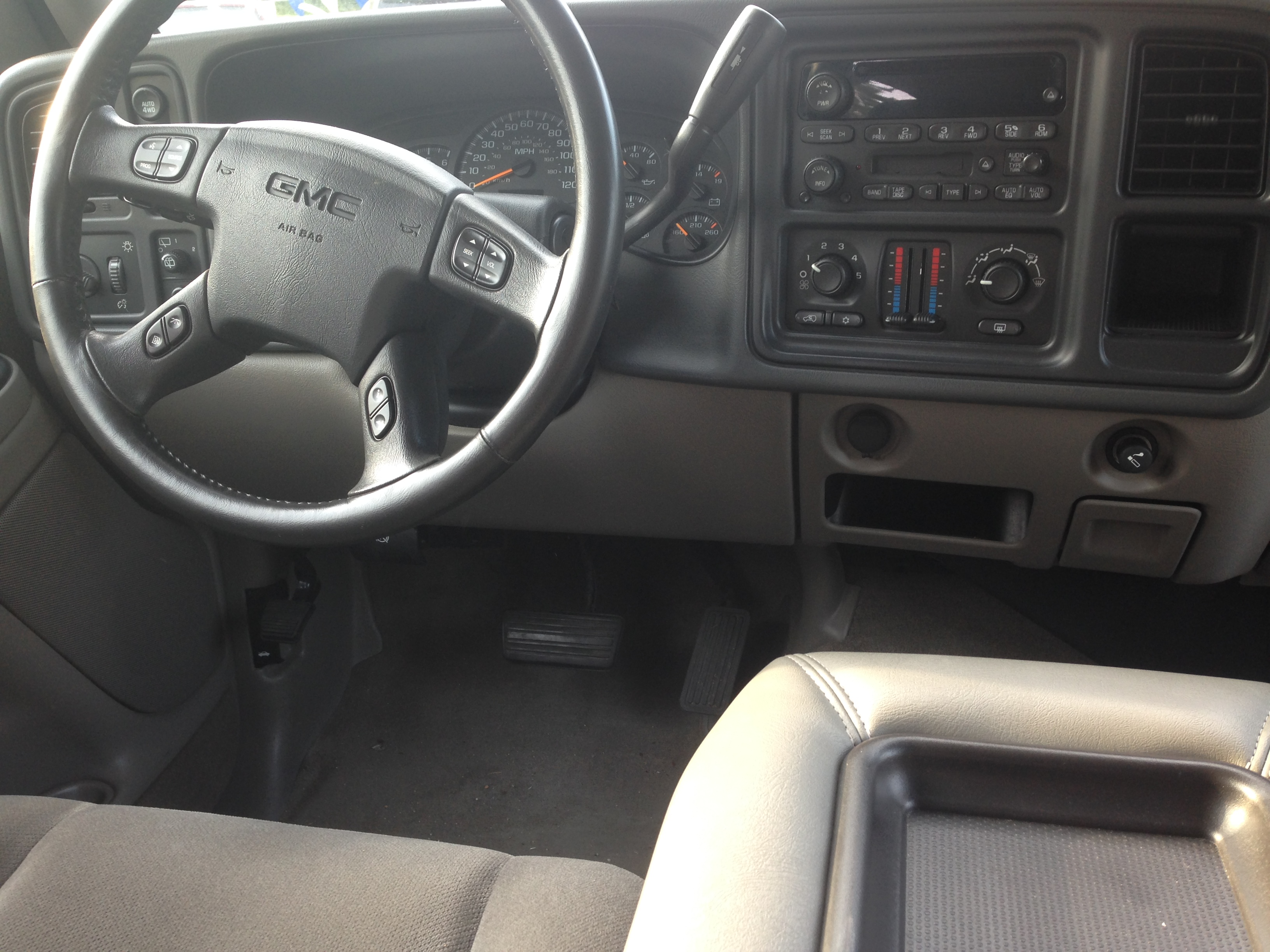
Front view and interior of second-generation post face-lift GMC Yukon

Other than the Tahoe Limited and Z71, the vehicle was redesigned and launched in January 2000 for the 2000 model year on the new GMT800 platform, still shared with the full-sized pickups and SUVs. Two new engines replaced the 5.7 L (350 cu in) Chevrolet small-block V8, and while both were smaller, both produced more horsepower but less torque. In Mexico, the GMT800 Chevrolet Tahoe is called the Chevrolet Sonora. A two-door GMT800 Tahoe prototype was made but never entered production. Suburban and Tahoe models sold in Mexico still offered the 5.7 L small-block Chevrolet V8 (RPO code L31) as an option in early models, whereas it was replaced by the new 5.3 L Vortec V8 engine (or the 4.8 L Vortec V8 in base Tahoe models) in all other markets.

Both vehicles received significant updates with only the grille, headlights, and body-side moldings distinguishing one from the other. Both vehicles now featured softer lines as part of a more aerodynamic design. The interior was also updated with new seats, dashboard, and door panels.

=== GMC Yukon Denali ===
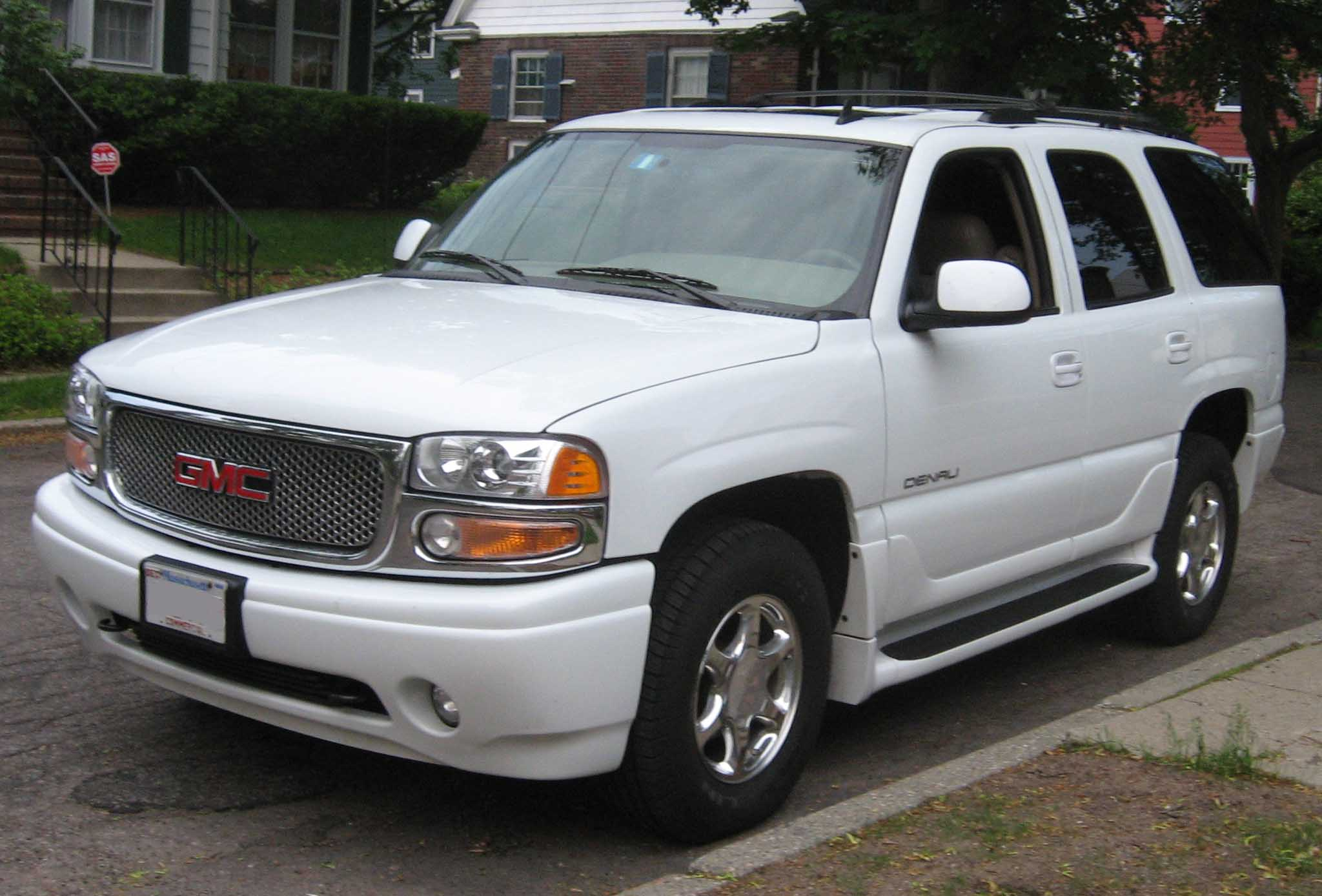
2006 GMC Yukon Denali

Although the Yukon was redesigned alongside the Chevrolet Suburban and Tahoe in 2000, the Denali and Escalade remained on the GMT400 platform. It was not until 2001 that the Denali and Escalade were redesigned. While the Escalade departed from its Yukon-based exterior design scheme in attempt to hide its roots, the Yukon Denali's exterior is almost the same as that of a post-2000 GMT800 Yukon. A larger 6.0 L engine, embossed side body panels, slightly reworked headlights with projector-beam lenses and reworked turn signal indicators, exclusive six-spoke 17-inch polished aluminum wheels with "GMC" embossed center caps, unique chrome "punch" grille, monochromatic front bumper with unique rounded fog lamps, monochromatic rear bumper, "DENALI" lettering on both front doors, exclusive two-tone leather seating surfaces with heated second row seats, a Driver Information Center module located in the center console, premium Bose Lux sound system with optional rear DVD entertainment system, and "YUKON DENALI" stitching on interior door surfaces and front headrests differentiate the Yukon Denali from the regular Yukon. 2001 also saw the introduction of the aforementioned "punch" grille, which has since become a hallmark of the Denali submodel. The Yukon Denali of this generation is powered by the 6.0 L Vortec 6000 V8, which was also found in the 2001 GMC Sierra C3 Denali. The Yukon Denali received a minor interior refresh for the 2003 model year. This refresh updated the gauge cluster, center console/armrest, and steering wheel. The redesign relocated the revised Driver Information Center/odometer to the bottom of the gauge cluster, and was now operated by buttons along the bottom of the newly revised steering wheel (the top portion of the wheel held newly revised audio controls). A storage cubby was placed in lieu of the 2001–2002 Driver Information Center module, and the armrest was no longer a locking armrest. This refresh also saw the removal of the "Yukon Denali" interior embossments that were previously used on the 2001–2002 Denali's interior panels and headrests. The second row seating arrangements were now standard heated captain's chairs instead of the previous second row bench seat. A premium Bose DVD-based navigation system and Bose subwoofer were also added as available options for 2003.

=== Changes by year ===
==== 2000 ====
All-new Tahoe and Yukon are launched. Side-impact airbags are standard for driver and front passenger, OnStar communications system optional, automatic headlamp control standard, power-operated sunroof optional for first time, new uplevel 9-speaker audio system with rear mounted subwoofer, Driver Message Center, new PassLock II theft-deterrent system, Autoride suspension system optional on Tahoe LT and Yukon SLT, all-new independent SLA front suspension with torsion bars, four-wheel disc brakes, and all-new five-link rear suspension with coil springs.

The GMT400 Tahoe was carried over into the 2000 model year as two "Limited Edition" models: the 4×2 Limited, and the 4×4 Z71. Both models were discontinued after the 2000 model year. The GMC Yukon Denali was redesigned for the 2001 model year, and the Cadillac Escalade was redesigned for 2002 (there was no Escalade for the 2001 model year).

==== 2001 ====
New colors Forest Green Metallic and Redfire Metallic are introduced while Dark Copper Metallic and Dark Carmine Red Metallic are discontinued. Two-tone paint is discontinued, optional Z71 package available on LT 4×4 includes: tube side steps, unique lower molding and wheel flares with extensions, color-keyed grille, bumpers, door handles and mirrors, unique front foglamps, unique luggage carrier with rear roller (roof rack), specifically tuned shock absorbers, 17-inch wheels, P265/70R17 all-terrain tires and OnStar. 40/20/40 bench seat gets revised cupholder design, Tan/Neutral replaces Light Oak/Medium Oak interior trim. OnStar is now optional on Tahoe LS.

==== 2002 ====
Tahoe LS receives a plethora of new standard features, including: six-way power adjustable seats, heated exterior mirrors with drivers-side auto-dimming feature, electric rear-window defogger and HomeLink Universal Transmitter. Base trim is discontinued. The Vortec 5300 V8 is now available with E85 capability. Tahoe LT models ordered in Redfire Metallic now come with body-color front bumper cap, bodyside moldings, and wheel flares. Premium ride suspension is made standard on all models (excluding Z71).

==== 2003 ====
GM's full-size SUVs saw a major refresh for the 2003 model year. New features include: StabiliTrak stability enhancement system, dual-level airbags, passenger-sensing system, adjustable brake and accelerator pedals with memory. New radio systems with Radio Data System (RDS), custom designed Bose audio system available on models with front bucket seats, XM Satellite Radio, and Panasonic rear-seat DVD entertainment system. DVD player was not able to be optioned with a sunroof until 2004. Tri-Zone climate control with manual controls standard on LS and Z71, automatic controls standard on LT. Second-row bucket seats optional on models with leather seating surfaces. LT models feature power-adjustable, body-color exterior mirrors with power folding and memory, auto dimming, and integrated turn signal indicators (RPO code DL3). 2003 was the only post-facelift year to feature standard two-tone door panels.

2003 Tahoes provided early compliance to the 2005 LATCH (Lower Anchors and Tethers for Children) federal safety standards. A redesigned instrument cluster featured a new Driver Information Center, which can monitor and report on up to 34 different vehicle system functions such as Service StabiliTrak, Ice Possible, and Door Ajar. The interior was refreshed, including a new eight-button steering wheel that allows the driver to safely access new infotainment features as well as a redesigned center console.

There were also new improvements to the powertrain and electrical system for 2003. These included a new Electronic Throttle Control (ETC) system to improve throttle feel and new oxygen sensors to improve durability and reduce emissions during engine warm-up. Models sold in California received a more robust catalytic converter to meet Ultra Low Emissions Vehicle (ULEV) standards. A new battery-rundown protection system automatically turns off the headlamps, parking lamps, and interior lighting if left on for more than 10 minutes with the key removed from the ignition.

New colors for 2003 include Sandalwood Metallic and Dark Spiral Gray Metallic.

==== 2004 ====
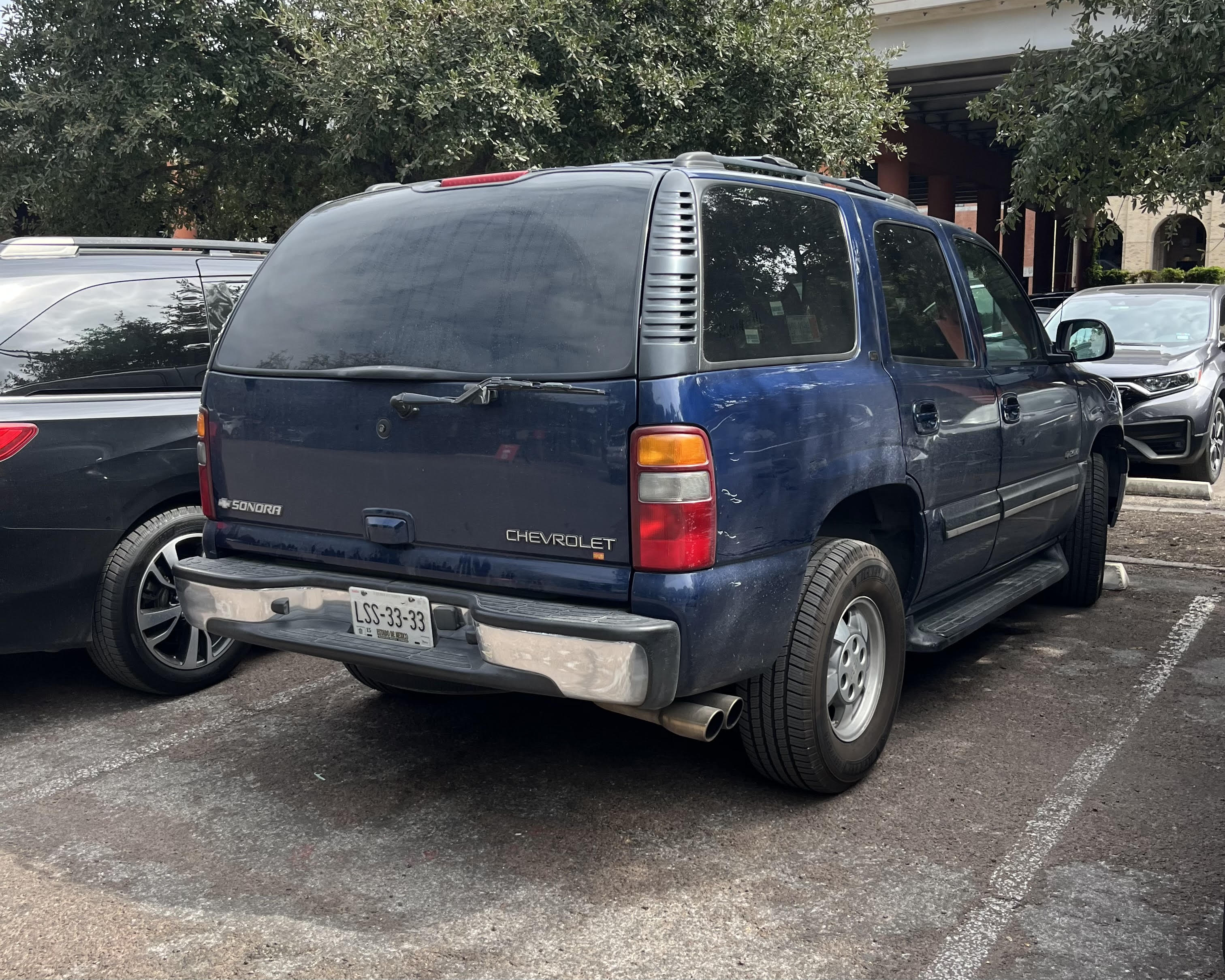
2004 Chevrolet Sonora (Mexico)

Tahoe received minor updates for 2004, most notably newly designed 16- and 17-inch wheel choices, updated black outlined taillights, and a tire-pressure monitoring system. A new DVD entertainment system was introduced that could also be ordered with a sunroof. Hydroboost brakes and a front-passenger seat belt reminder were also added as was a seven- to four-pin trailer brake wiring adapter. 2004 was the final year the Tahoe could be ordered with rear barn doors. The "Tahoe" badge on the front doors was removed.

The 4.8L Vortec 4800 V8 is now rated at 285 hp (213 kW) and 295 lb⋅ft (400 N⋅m), while the 5.3L Vortec 5300 V8 is now rated at 295 hp (220 kW) and 330 lb⋅ft (450 N⋅m).

New colors for 2004 were Dark Blue Metallic, Silver Birch Metallic, and Sport Red Metallic.

==== 2005 ====
For 2005, the Z71 package was now available on 2WD models with updated red and gray side pillar emblems, and the Chevrolet tailgate emblem returned on Z71 models where a gold and silver Z71 logo had been in previous years (2001–2004). A sixth-generation OnStar system with analog/digital coverage and improved hands-free capabilities is now standard on all trims, while a touch-screen navigation system is now optional. Other new features included an upgraded tire-pressure monitoring system, 160-amp alternator, new interior trim, updated body side molding, and redesigned aerodynamic side-sill assist steps to improve efficiency. All Tahoes came standard with a rear liftgate and liftglass, and halfway through 2005, a new rear liftglass design was standard featuring a borderless frame.

A new all-electric cooling system helps with quiet operation as well as fuel efficiency. New aerodynamic changes, including a new front air deflector, help the Tahoe improve fuel efficiency by about 1 MPG.

New colors include Sandstone Metallic and Bermuda Blue Metallic.

==== 2006 ====
2006 marked the final year of the Tahoe and Yukon on the GMT800 platform, and because of this, only minor changes were made. StabiliTrak became standard on all models, and the button for this feature was located where the dashboard storage was in previous years. The OnStar and XM Satellite Radio antennas were merged into one "shark fin" antenna. The Chevrolet badging was also removed from the liftgate, and the front lower door carpet was removed. The catalytic converter was moved closer to the engine, and a new manual parking brake adjuster was installed.

Bermuda Blue Metallic now becomes an extra-cost option.

The flex-fuel capable Vortec 5300 V8 is now rated at 335 lb⋅ft (454 N⋅m) on regular gasoline, and is now available on all retail packages. The Vortec 4800 V8 was no longer available on 4WD models.

=== Engines ===
Year	Engine	Power	Torque	RPO Code	VIN Code (8th Digit)	Notes
2000–2003	4.8 L Vortec 4800 V8	275 hp (205 kW) @ 5200 RPM	290 lb⋅ft (390 N⋅m) @ 4000 RPM	LR4	V	
2004–2006	4.8 L Vortec 4800 V8	285 hp (213 kW) @ 5600 RPM	295 lb⋅ft (400 N⋅m) @ 4000 RPM	LR4	V	No longer available on 4WD models after 2005
2000–2003	5.3 L Vortec 5300 V8	285 hp (213 kW) @ 5200 RPM	325 lb⋅ft (441 N⋅m) @ 4000 RPM	LM7 L59 (flex-fuel)	T Z (flex-fuel)	
2004–2005	5.3 L Vortec 5300 V8	295 hp (220 kW) @ 5200 RPM	330 lb⋅ft (450 N⋅m) @ 4000 RPM	LM7 L59 (flex-fuel)	T Z (flex-fuel)	
2006	5.3 L Vortec 5300 V8	295 hp (220 kW) @ 5200 RPM	335 lb⋅ft (454 N⋅m) @ 4000 RPM	LM7 L59 (flex-fuel)	T Z (flex-fuel)	
2001–2002	6.0 L Vortec 6000 V8	320 hp (239 kW) @ 5200 RPM	365 lb⋅ft (495 N⋅m) @ 4000 RPM	LQ4	U	Denali only
2003	6.0 L Vortec 6000 V8	320 hp (239 kW) @ 5000 RPM	365 lb⋅ft (495 N⋅m) @ 4000 RPM	LQ4	U	Denali only
2004	6.0 L Vortec 6000 V8	325 hp (242 kW) @ 5200 RPM	365 lb⋅ft (495 N⋅m) @ 4000 RPM	LQ4	U	Denali only
2005–2006	6.0 L Vortec 6000 V8	335 hp (250 kW) @ 5200 RPM	375 lb⋅ft (508 N⋅m) @ 4000 RPM	LQ4	U	Denali only

== Third generation (2007) ==
GMT900
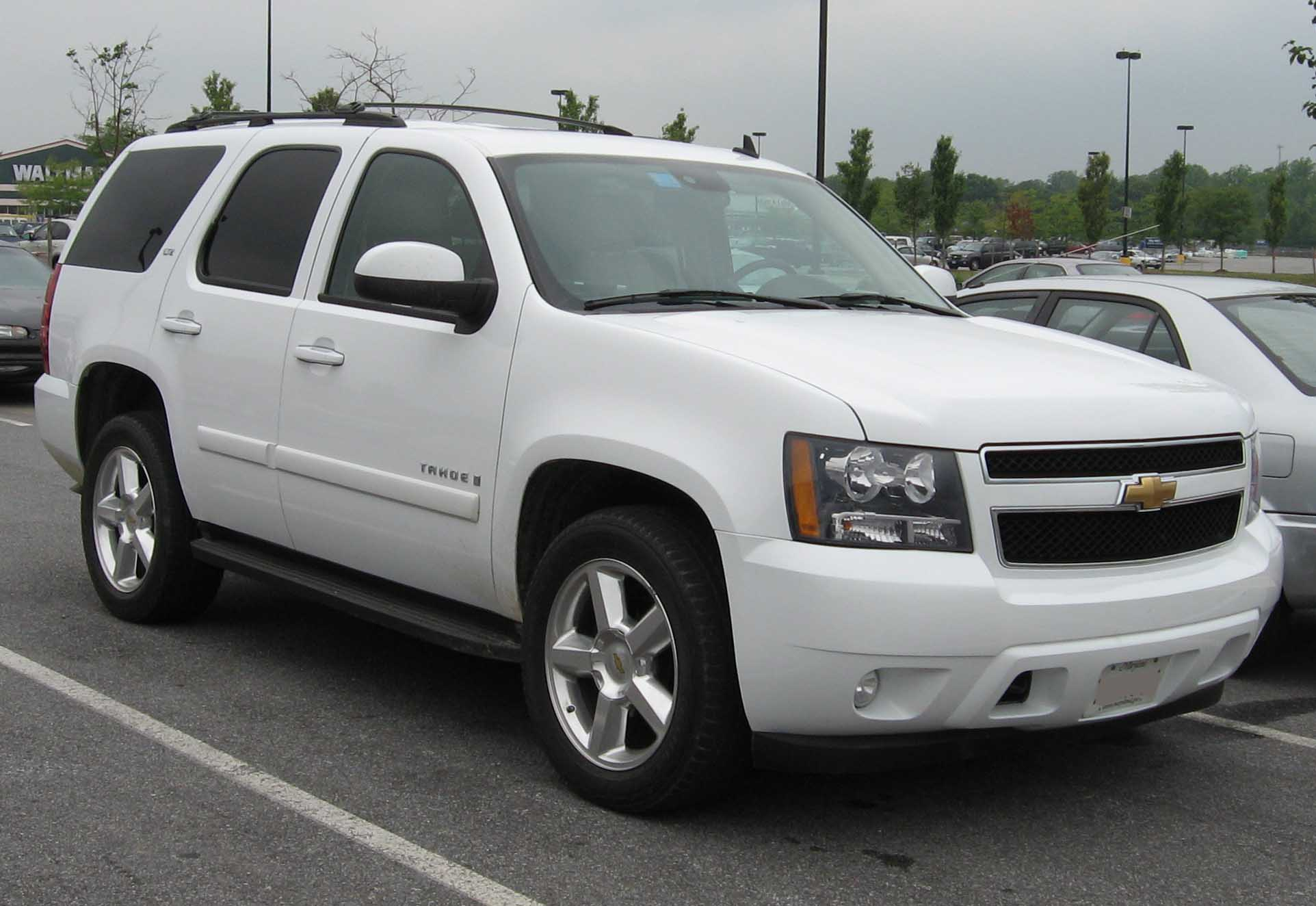
- 2007 Chevrolet Tahoe

Overview
- Also called: GMC Yukon; Chevrolet Tahoe 4WD Special Service; Chevrolet Tahoe 2WD PPV
- Production: December 2005 – 2014
- Model years: 2007–2014
- Assembly: United States: Arlington, Texas (Arlington Assembly); Janesville, Wisconsin (Janesville Assembly: 2006–2009); Russia: Kaliningrad (Avtotor); Venezuela: Valencia, Carabobo (Valencia)
- Designer: Wayne Cherry (2002)

Body and chassis
- Body style: 4-door SUV
- Platform: GMT921/922 (GMT920)
- Related: Chevrolet Suburban; GMC Yukon XL; Cadillac Escalade

Powertrain
- Engine: gasoline: 4.8 L LY2 V8; 5.3 L LY5 V8; 6.2 L L92 V8; gasoline / E85: 5.3 L LMG V8; 6.2 L L9H/L94 V8; hybrid gasoline / electric: 6.0 L LFA/LZ1 V8
- Transmission: 4-speed 4L60-E automatic; 6-speed 6L80 automatic; 4-speed automatic CVT 2ML70

Dimensions
- Wheelbase: 116.0 in (2,946 mm)
- Length: 202.0 in (5,131 mm)
- Width: 79.0 in (2,007 mm)
- Height: 74.6–77.0 in (1,895–1,956 mm)

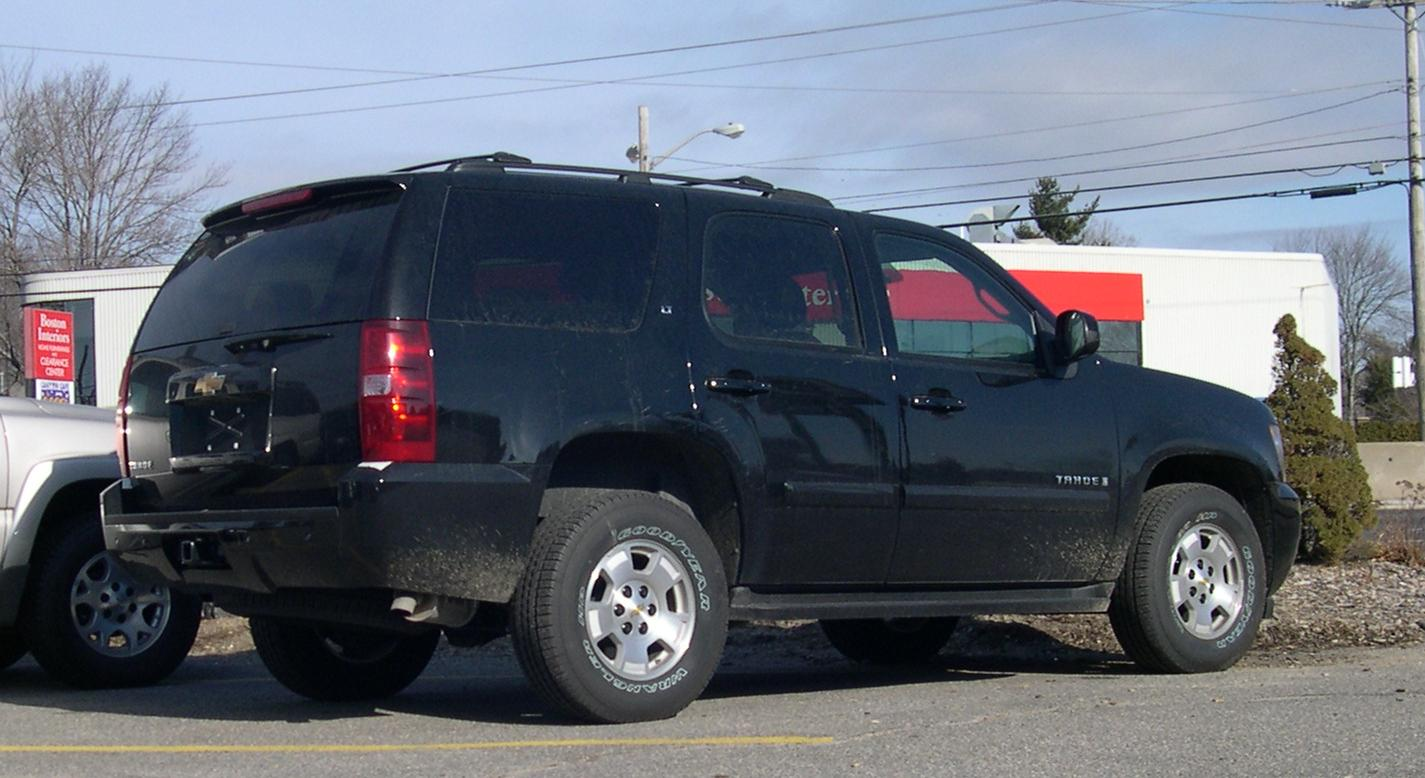
2007 Chevrolet Tahoe LT

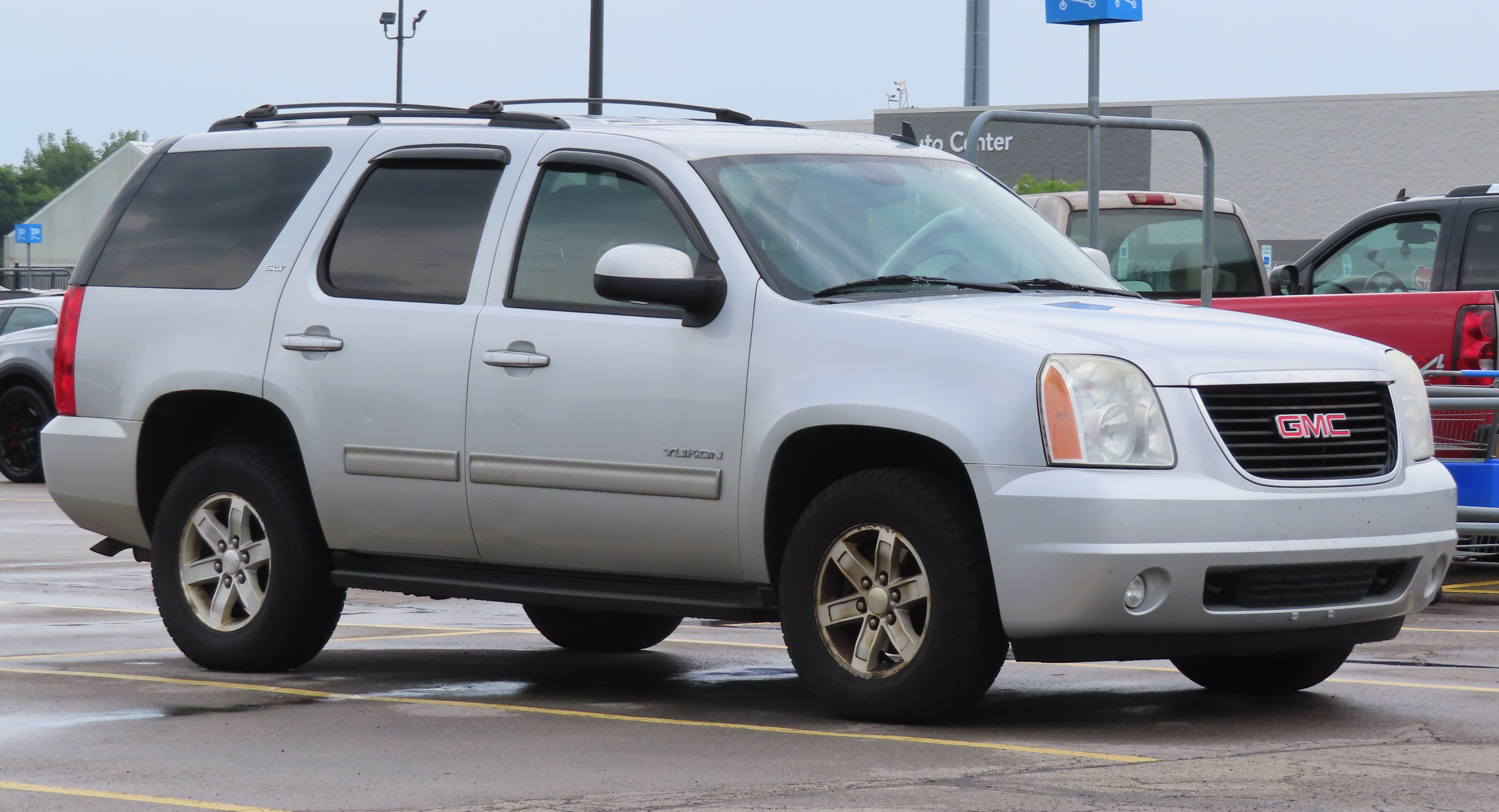
2010–2014 GMC Yukon SLT

General Motors redesigned the Tahoe and Yukon on the new GMT900 platform for the 2007 model year. A hybrid version of the Tahoe/Yukon, which uses the shared GM/Chrysler Advanced Hybrid System 2, followed with the 2008 models. The GMT900-based Tahoe and Yukon exceeded initial sales expectations and continued to sell well despite a weakening market for large SUVs. The short-wheelbase Tahoe and its police counterpart began production at Arlington Assembly on December 1, 2005. SWB Yukon production began in early 2006, with Janesville Assembly coming online as well. For the first time, GM used the Tahoe name in Mexico.

For 2007, the GMC Yukon and Chevrolet Tahoe received different front fascias, hood, and tail lights. The Yukon boasted a monolithic grille and headlights, while the Tahoe grille was divided by a body-colored bar similar to the chrome bar found on the GMT800 Tahoe. Both the redesigned Yukon and Tahoe featured a more crisp, upright, angular design that gave the vehicles a prominent, more upscale appearance than that of their predecessors. The interior was significantly redesigned as well, with features such as a faux wood trim dashboard with chrome-accented instrument controls and new inset gauge cluster design. New door panels, as well as new seats, were also added to the interior. The interior still retains its nine-passenger seating availability, but only on the base Tahoe 1LS/Yukon SLE models, like the Suburban and Yukon XL counterparts. The Tahoe/Suburban 1LS would now become the base model for 2007, adding the premium LTZ trim level as the upper Tahoe/Suburban equipment level. The Yukon/Yukon XL would retain its SLE/SLT/Denali trims.

Highway mileage was improved from 19 mpg_{‑US} (12 L/100 km; 23 mpg_{‑imp}) to 21 to 22 mpg_{‑US} (11 to 11 L/100 km; 25 to 26 mpg_{‑imp}) with the addition of Active Fuel Management cylinder deactivation. For 2009, the 6.2 L engine in the Yukon Denali got a power increase to 403 hp (301 kW), while a 395 hp (295 kW) 6.2L was added as an option for the Tahoe LTZ. A 6-speed 6L80 automatic transmission replaced the 4-speed on all trucks except 2WD models with the 4.8L engine. The 2011 model has a NHTSA rollover risk of 24.6%, and a lateral roadholding of 0.79g.

In 2008, a two-mode hybrid was introduced with two trim levels: HY1 or HY2. This paired a 332 hp (248 kW) LFA 6.0L Vortec 6000 V8 with a hybrid drive unit that acted as an infinitely variable transmission, which included a pair of 80 hp (60 kW) / 184 lb⋅ft (249 N⋅m) torque electric motors. The coefficient of drag improved from 0.36 to 0.34 by using upgraded body panels; the vehicles retained a 12V battery for most accessory electrical gear and added a high-voltage (288V) traction battery system. The hybrid version uses aluminum body panels and driveline components which collectively offset the increased weight from the drive unit and battery, putting the hybrid at 5,840 lb (2,650 kg). The hybrid models also included 300V Electric AC, 42V power steering, and LED taillights (only an option from 2008 to 2013). This variant was named the Green Car of the Year for 2008 by Green Car Journal, a decision which was later lampooned during a segment on the BBC series Top Gear. Fuel consumption improved from 14 / 19 mpg_{‑US} (16.8 / 12.4 L/100 km) city/highway to 20 / 20 mpg_{‑US} (11.8 / 11.8 L/100 km).

During the 2009 model year, LTZ models had the option of the 405 hp (302 kW) 6.2L Vortec 6200. The option was dropped after only one model year.

2010 models underwent a mild mid-cycle refresh including a slightly raised bumper, removal of the GM "Mark of Excellence" door badge, revised interior door trim, improved side structure, side torso airbags and optional side blind zone alert.

For 2012, the GMC Yukon offered a special Heritage Edition package, featuring unique Heritage Edition exterior badging, embroidered color-keyed carpeted floor mats, embroidered headrests, SLT-2 Equipment Group standard features (such as 10-way memory leather seats and power liftgate), and optional 20-inch wheels. The Heritage Edition added $1,970 to the price of the Yukon and Yukon XL, and was offered in three colors: Heritage Blue, White Diamond Tricoat, and Onyx Black.

=== GMC Yukon Denali ===
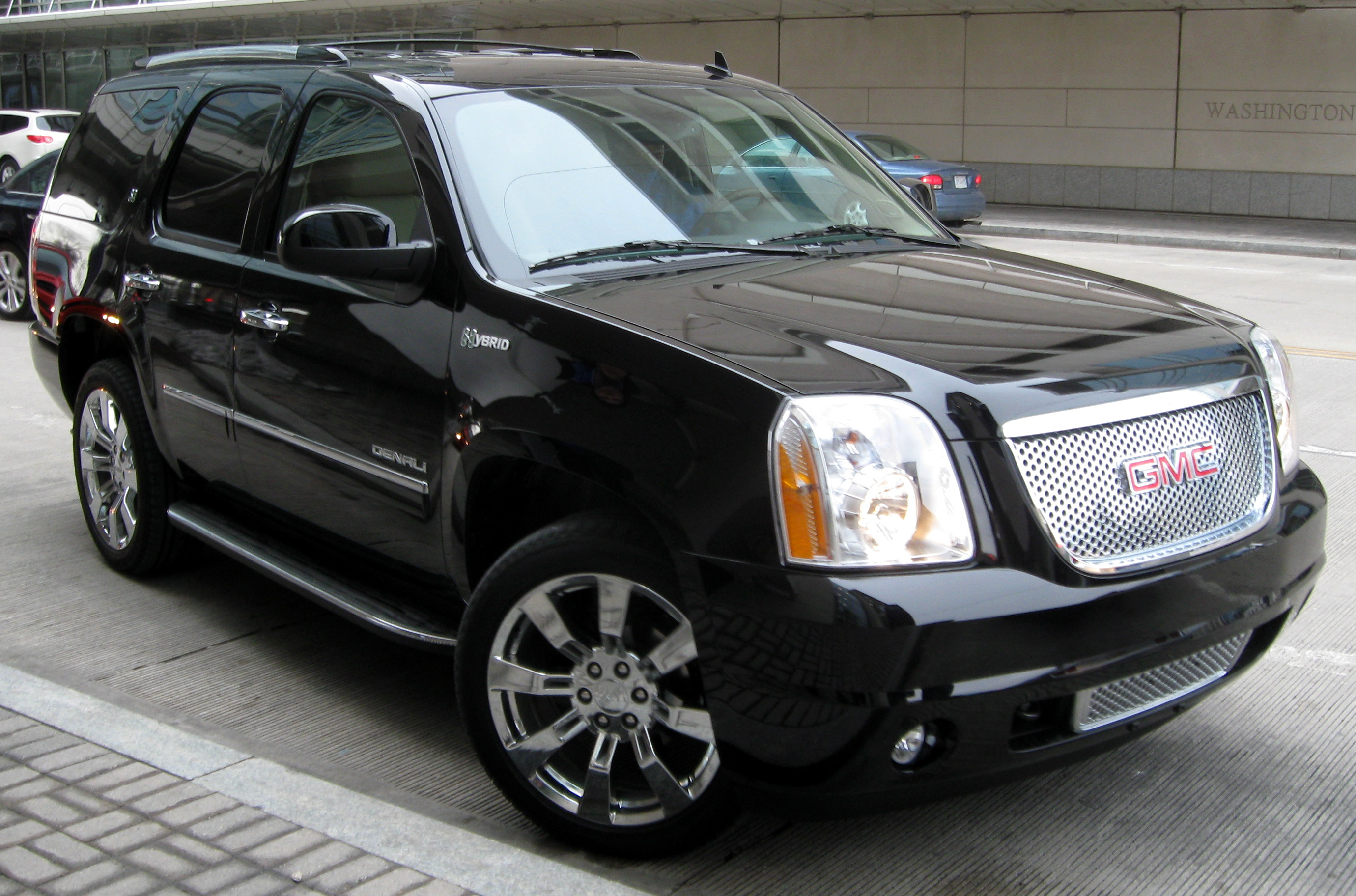
2011 GMC Yukon Denali

The Yukon Denali was redesigned for the 2007 model year alongside the regular mainstream Yukon. The biggest change was in the styling, such as the flattened tailgate reminiscent of the new Tahoe, and particularly the grille and headlight shapes, which made the Yukon look less aggressive than previous models. The only exterior difference between the Yukon Denali and the standard Yukon are the chrome grille and extensive use of chrome accents and the Escalade rear bumper, as well as the insignias, embeveled rocker panels, chromed headlights, and the Vortec 6200 engine, which it shares with the Cadillac Escalade. For the 2009 model year, the Yukon came fitted with a standard power-tilting steering wheel, exclusive to the Denali trim.

=== The Apprentice ad contest ===
In 2006, the 2007 Tahoe was featured on and promoted through Donald Trump's television series The Apprentice, where the two teams put together a show for the top General Motors employees to learn about the new Tahoe. Also, The Apprentice sponsored a controversial online contest in which users could create a 30-second commercial for the new Tahoe by entering text captions into the provided video clips; the winner's ad would air on national television. An early example of user-generated marketing, headed by ad agency Campbell Ewald, the campaign began to backfire when hundreds of environmentally conscious parodies flooded YouTube and Chevrolet's website critiquing the vehicle for its low fuel economy. Over 400 negative ads were created in total; however, over 20,000 positive ads were created, which Chevrolet viewed as successful in spite of the negative media attention.

=== Engines ===
Year	Engine	Power	Torque	Notes
2007–2009	4.8 L Vortec V8	295 hp (220 kW)	305 lb⋅ft (414 N⋅m)	2WD models only.
2007–2014	5.3 L Vortec V8	320 hp (239 kW)	340 lb⋅ft (461 N⋅m)	
2007–2014	5.3 L Vortec V8	326 hp (243 kW)	348 lb⋅ft (472 N⋅m)	326 hp / 348 lb-ft on E85; 320 hp / 340 lb-ft on gasoline.
2008–2009	6.0 L Vortec V8	332 hp (248 kW)	367 lb⋅ft (498 N⋅m)	Two-mode hybrid with two 80 hp (60 kW) / 184 lb⋅ft (249 N⋅m) electric motors. Combined output of the gas and electric motors totals 379 hp (283 kW) / 472 lb⋅ft (640 N⋅m).
2010–2013	6.0 L Vortec V8	332 hp (248 kW)	367 lb⋅ft (498 N⋅m)	Same as above, but with Variable Valve Timing.
2007–2009	6.2 L Vortec V8	395 hp (295 kW)	417 lb⋅ft (565 N⋅m)	Tahoe LTZ trim option (2008–2009).
2009–2011	6.2 L Vortec V8	405 hp (302 kW)	417 lb⋅ft (565 N⋅m)	E85-capable; standard on 4WD Tahoe LTZ models.
2011–2014	6.2 L Vortec V8	403 hp (301 kW)	417 lb⋅ft (565 N⋅m)	Yukon Denali; VVT.

== Fourth generation (2015) ==
GMT K2UC/G
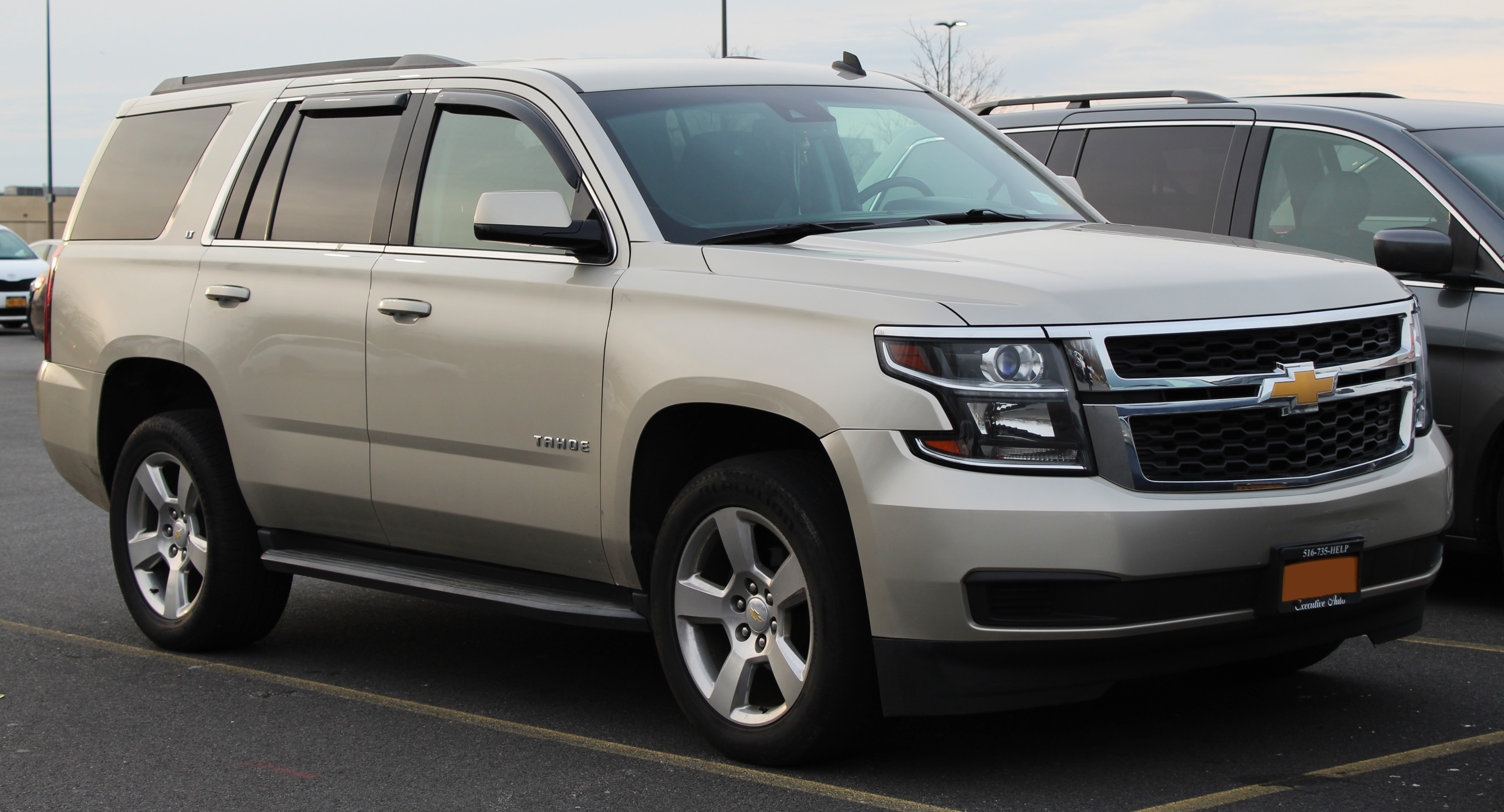
- 2015 Chevrolet Tahoe LT

Overview
- Also called: GMC Yukon
- Production: January 2014 – December 2019
- Model years: 2015–2020
- Assembly: United States: Arlington, Texas; Belarus: Minsk
- Designer: Ed Welburn (2011)

Body and chassis
- Body style: 4-door SUV
- Layout: Front engine, rear-wheel drive / four-wheel drive
- Platform: GMTK2XX; K2UC: Chevrolet Tahoe; K2UG: GMC Yukon/Yukon Denali
- Related: Cadillac Escalade/Escalade ESV (2015); Chevrolet Suburban/GMC Yukon XL (2015)

Powertrain
- Engine: 5.3 L Ecotec3 FlexFuel V8; 6.2 L Ecotec3 FlexFuel V8
- Transmission: 6-speed 6L80 automatic (2015-2017); 8-speed 8L90 automatic (Denali)(mid 2015-2017); 10-speed 10L80 automatic (2018-2020)

Dimensions
- Wheelbase: 116.0 in (2,946 mm)
- Length: 203.9 in (5,179 mm)
- Width: 80.5 in (2,045 mm)
- Height: 74.4 in (1,890 mm); Denali: 77.1 in (1,958 mm)

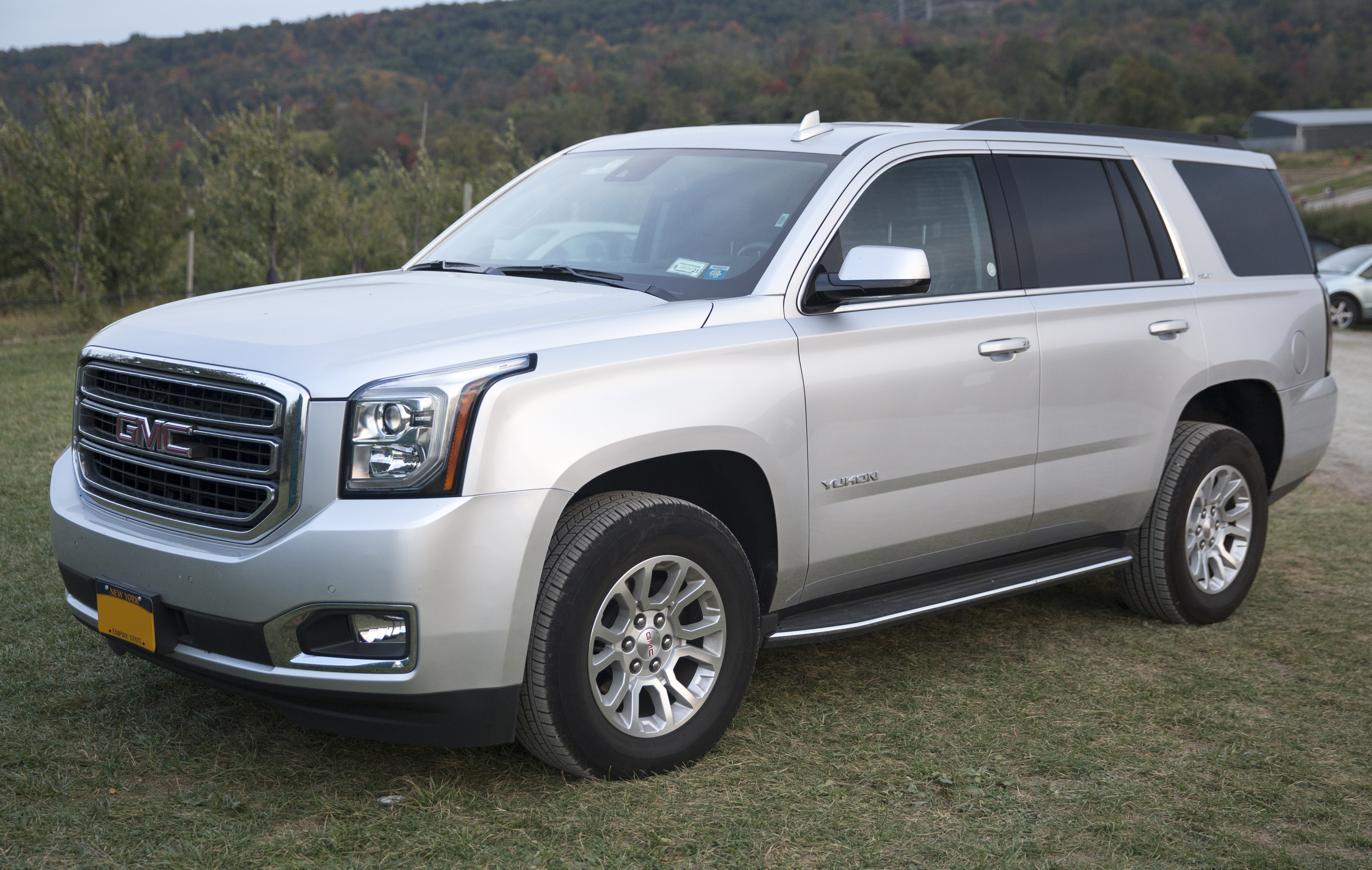

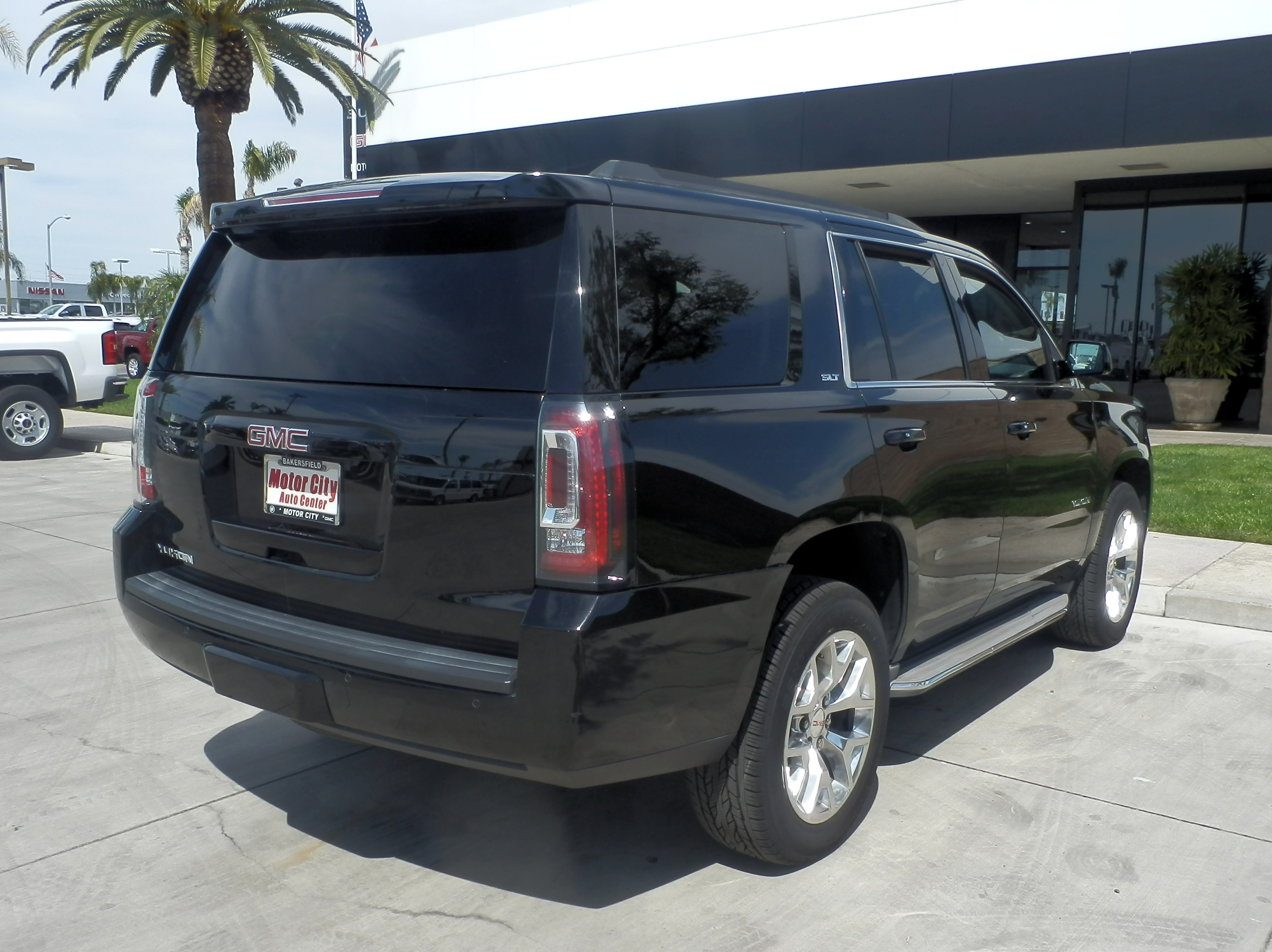
GMC Yukon SLT front and rear

The Chevrolet Tahoe, Chevrolet Suburban, GMC Yukon, GMC Yukon XL, Cadillac Escalade, and Cadillac Escalade ESV had a shortened 2014 model year starting in June 2013, and was replaced with a new version in February 2014 as a 2015 model. This generation marks the discontinuation of this model and all Chevrolet vehicles in European and right-hand markets.

The Tahoe and Yukon were built on the GMT K2XX platform and assigned as K2UC (for Chevrolet Tahoe) and K2UG (for GMC Yukon). Production on the Tahoe and Yukon began in December 2013 with the first completed SUVs being used for testing purposes, and started officially shipping the vehicles to dealerships on February 5, 2014. The 2015 Tahoe was later named the fastest-selling vehicle for February 2014, averaging seven days of sales upon its release. On September 12, 2013, GM released photos and press release of the fourth-generation Tahoe and Yukon. Like its larger siblings Suburban and Yukon XL, the front fascias of the Tahoe and Yukon are distinct, but from the base of the A-pillars back, they share most of the same styling cues. This now includes inlaid doors that tuck into the door sills, instead of over them, improving aerodynamics and fuel economy, and lessens interior noise. The hoods and liftgate panels now are made of aluminum in an effort to reduce vehicle weight. A more-efficient, direct-injected EcoTec3 powertrain coupled with improved aerodynamics help increase fuel economy for the SUVs. Both fourth-generation SUVs no longer share a single piece of sheet metal or lighting element with the brands' full-size pickup trucks, and the front grilles of both vehicles are slightly altered to give them their own identity. The front headlights feature projector-beam headlamps flanking the Chevrolet-signature dual-port grille – chrome on all models, sweeping into the front fenders, while the LTZ trims feature high-intensity discharge headlamps and LED daytime running lamps.

Also new were the addition of fold-flat second- and third-row seats, which were now a standard feature but could be equipped with an optional power-folding feature for the upgraded trims, and an additional two inches of leg room for second-row passengers. The Tahoe now had an available power-tilt, telescoping steering wheel. For the Yukon variant, this feature was carried over from 2009–2014 Yukon Denali, now available in the SLT trim as well. The third-row fold-flat feature was accomplished using a raised platform that reduces available cargo space behind the third-row seats. Standard third-row seats and raised "fold-flat" platform significantly reduced available cargo space compared with previous Tahoe models. Multiple USB ports and power outlets were now spread throughout their interiors, including one 110-volt, three-prong outlet, with the Tahoe adding an available eight-inch color touch-screen radio with next-generation MyLink connectivity along with an available rear-seat entertainment system (but did not feature a Blu-ray option which was exclusive to the Suburban for 2015), while the Yukon added a standard eight-inch-diagonal color touch screen radio with enhanced IntelliLink and available navigation.

The Yukon interior had more features including seats stuffed with dual-firmness foam, a standard Bose sound system and SD card slots, and laminated glass for the windshield and front windows, decreasing interior noise. GM's third-generation magnetic ride control suspension is optional on the Tahoe LTZ models, whose upgraded features included third-generation magnetic ride control, a real-time damping system that delivers more precise body motion control by "reading" the road every millisecond, and changing damping in just five milliseconds.

The new platform was based on the 2014 Chevrolet Silverado/GMC Sierra 1500. Both SUVs featured sound-deadening material to improve cabin quietness. A new Cadillac Escalade and Cadillac Escalade ESV arrived in dealerships in April 2014. Models continued for the Tahoe and Suburban as LS, LT, and LTZ, and the Yukon and Yukon XL as SLE, SLT, and Denali. The Tahoe and Yukon went on sale in February 2014 as an early 2015 model year vehicle. Prices for the all-new GM SUVs were similar to the previous-generation GMT900 SUVs. The Hybrid models were all dropped along with their powertrains, and the Yukon Denali AWD was also dropped as well.

On September 26, 2014, Chevrolet debuted the updated Z71 Tahoe at the State Fair of Texas, along with the debut of the Texas Edition Tahoe, the latter because of Texas having the largest units of Tahoes sold in the United States (as of August 2014, sales of the Chevrolet SUVs in Texas were up 37 percent) and to celebrate the 60th anniversary of GM's Arlington Assembly plant; production began in October 2014. As with the previous Z71 Tahoe, this version continued to be offered in a 4WD LT trim only, featuring a front skid plate, off-road tires mounted on 18-inch wheels, a unique grille, running boards, and "Z71" identification inside and out. Fog lamps, front tow hooks, and front parking assist were also included. The Texas Edition was available in both LT and LTZ trims, featuring a maximum trailering package, twenty-inch polished aluminum wheels (on LT models), 22-inch premium painted aluminum wheels (on LTZ models), and an exclusive "Texas Edition" badge. The Texas Edition Tahoe package was part of a lineup that also used the Texas Edition package, alongside the Suburban and Silverado.

The demand and interest in the redesigned Tahoe also translated into a 108 percent sales spike since it went on sale in February 2014, with most dealers reporting the units being sold within 17 days after they arrive on the dealership lots, with most customers opting for the fully-optioned LTZ model, making it one of Chevrolet's fastest-selling vehicles in 2014 along with the Suburban, which posted even quicker inventory turnovers.

=== GMC Yukon Denali ===
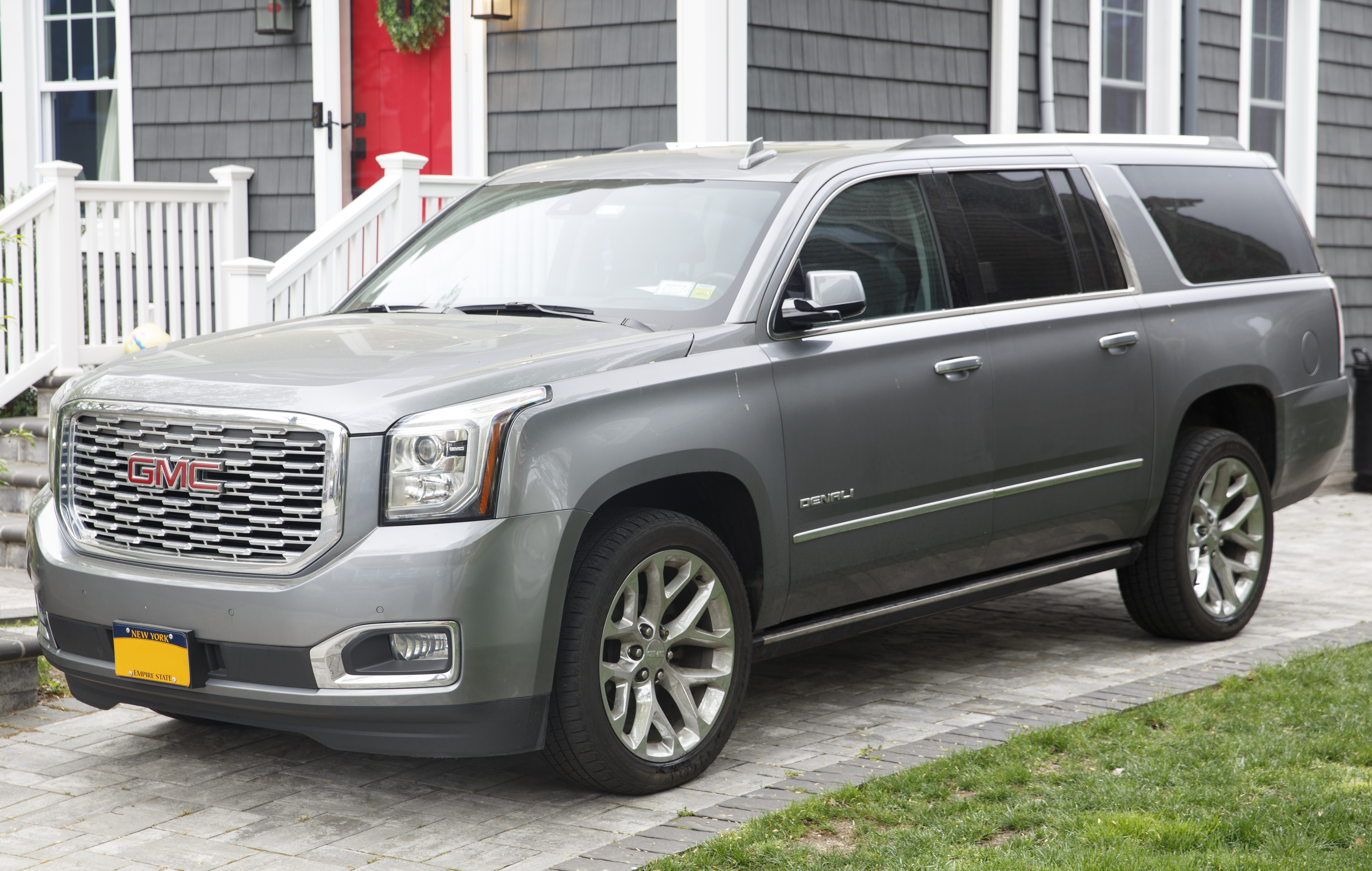
2020 GMC Yukon XL Denali

The Yukon Denali was redesigned and updated along with other GM SUVs in September 2013, and went to dealerships on February 5, 2014 as a 2015 model. The Yukon Denali continued with the top-of-the-line features (using similar features as found on the Tahoe LTZ trim) and the front grille honeycomb design. It was now also equipped with a new active noise-cancellation technology and GM's third-generation magnetic ride control suspension as a standard feature. For the first several years, the 6.2-liter V8 was unique to the Denali (and Russian-market Tahoes), but in 2018, this was also made available on the Tahoe LTZ. In November 2014, the Yukon Denali saw its MSRP bumped up by $1,300, partly as a result of the loaded features added to its 2015 mid-year updates. For the 2018 model year, the Yukon Denali received a ten-speed automatic transmission in place of the 8-speed units used on other models.

=== Engines ===
Year	Engine	Power	Torque	Notes
2015–2020	5.3 L Ecotec3 V8	355 hp (265 kW)	383 lb⋅ft (519 N⋅m)	
2015–2020	6.2 L Ecotec3 V8	420 hp (313 kW)	460 lb⋅ft (620 N⋅m)	Originally exclusive to the GMC Yukon Denali trim, but available in the Tahoe with the RST Performance Pack from 2018

=== Safety recalls ===
On March 23, 2014, a 2015 GMC Yukon caught fire and went up in flames in Anaheim, California, after a couple, who along with the sales representative who was giving them a test drive, noticed the vehicle stopping and that smoke was starting to make its way into the cabin, prompting the three individuals to park the car and escape before it was destroyed within 15 minutes. The cause of the fire was traced to an oil leak and an engine malfunction. Despite being an isolated incident, the 2015 Tahoe and Yukon were not believed to be tied to GM's recall of its vehicles announced on March 17, 2014. But five days later on March 28, 2014, GM announced a recall on the 2015 Tahoe and Yukon in order to fix a "transmission oil cooler line that is not securely seated in its fitting," causing the vehicle to stop and rupture the oil cooling line, resulting in the engine to malfunction and catching fire immediately. On June 6, 2014, GM issued another recall on the 2015 Tahoe and Yukon because their radio control modules may not work, and thus prevent certain audible safety warnings.

=== Changes by year ===
==== 2015 mid-year update ====
The Tahoe received 4G LTE, Wi-Fi, and Siri capability, a new color palette (Brownstone Metallic), and added a hands-free power liftgate feature that is standard on LTZ, but included on LT with the optional Luxury Package. The MyLink with Navigation feature became standard on the LTZ trim, while E85 capability was removed from retail orders.

The Yukon, in addition to receiving the aforementioned features, saw the 6.2-liter EcoTec3 V8 engine being updated with the new 8L90E eight-speed automatic transmission for the interim model year, allowing it to improve fuel economy.

A body-colored shark-fin antenna was added with the 2015 mid-year refresh for all models.

==== 2016 ====
For the 2016 model year, the Chevrolet Tahoe received more upgraded changes and new features, similar to the ones added to the Suburban. The changes included power-adjustable pedals, forward collision alert, IntelliBeam headlamps, lane keep assist, and a safety alert seat as part of the newly introduced enhanced driver alert package as an available option on the LS trim. The inside floor console with storage-area SD card reader was removed and a new infotainment system was introduced, officially ending the CD player era for the Tahoe; the 8-inch MyLink feature was expanded to the LS trim and became standard (replacing the 4-inch display), although the navigation feature remains as an option on LT and standard on LTZ. A new liftgate shield was added to the Theft Protection Package, along with the new lane keep assist which replaced the lane departure warning. The capless fuel fill tanks became standard on all trims. Siren Red Tintcoat and Iridescent Pearl Tricoat became the new color trims, replacing Crystal Red Tintcoat and White Diamond Tricoat. The instrument cluster was re-configured with a new multi-color enhancement and a heads-up display was introduced as a standard only on the LTZ trim.

The 2016 GMC Yukon also saw similar changes, with liftgate, power, hands-free now packaged on SLT trims, a free-flow feature that replaced the Premium package, and two new premium colors (Crimson Red Tintcoat and White Frost Tricoat) replacing Crystal Red Tintcoat and White Diamond Tricoat respectively.

The 2016 Tahoe came equipped with both Apple CarPlay and Android Auto capability features. However, only one of their phone brands at any one time can be used. The 2014 and 2015 LTZ and Denali packages came equipped with a "wireless" charging accessory. while the Android Auto option would only be available on LT and LTZ trims featuring eight-inch screens.

In 2015, the Russian-built Chevrolet Tahoe received the 6.2L V8 L86 EcoTec engine, which was the only engine offered in the region as an exclusive to the Russian and CIS markets only, as GM had no plans to make it available to North America.

==== 2017 ====
For the 2017 model year, Chevrolet made upgraded changes to the Tahoe. New additions include the teen driver feature, the App Store feature, a rear seat reminder, and low speed forward automatic braking. Two new colors, Blue Velvet and Pepperdust Metallic, were added to replace four colors. The 22-inch wheels option was expanded to three, and the rear seat entertainment system was overhauled. Chevrolet also made changes in the level trims, with the c-pillar badge now removed from LS models and the LTZ trim renamed to Premier, which would continue to be the top-of-the-line model.

The 2017 model year Yukon also received similar changes, but with a few exceptions. Two new colors, Dark Blue Sapphire Metallic and Mineral Metallic were introduced, the latter exclusive to the Denali, which also added a new 22-inch ultra bright aluminum wheels with midnight silver premium paint and a head-up display to its features. The interior backlights changed from red to blue. The heated and vented driver and front passenger seats are now standard on the SLT and Denali trims.

==== 2018 ====
For the 2018 model year, the 6.2-liter EcoTec3 V8 engine became available in the Tahoe RST (when bought with the Performance Package). All 2018 Tahoe and Suburban trim levels came standard with LED daytime running lights, replacing the low beam projector DRLs on LS and LT trim levels. The 2018 Tahoe was also available with the Custom Edition package for the base LS trim level. The Tahoe LS trim level featured a chrome grille, 18-inch painted aluminum wheels, 18-inch all-season blackwall tires, and third-row seat delete (reducing seating capacity from eight to five) if ordered with the Custom Edition package. The GMC Yukon received a 10-speed automatic transmission on the Denali trim level, and the Yukon was facelifted for 2018 with a refreshed grille similar to the one from the 2017 GMC Acadia and 2018 GMC Terrain.

==== 2019 ====
The 2019 Tahoe/Yukon saw only minor changes. One exterior color, Shadow Gray Metallic, replaced both Havana Metallic and Tungsten Metallic, and the Premier model received a newly redesigned badge on the liftgate.

==== 2020 ====
The 2020 model year Tahoe/Yukon was shortened to make way for the upcoming fifth generation. From the Tahoe, the All Season Package and the LT Signature Package were removed, along with the Pepperdust Metallic exterior color, while the 2020 GMC Yukon replaced its Pepperdust Metallic color with Carbon Black Metallic with no additional changes.

== Fifth generation (2021) ==
GMT1UC
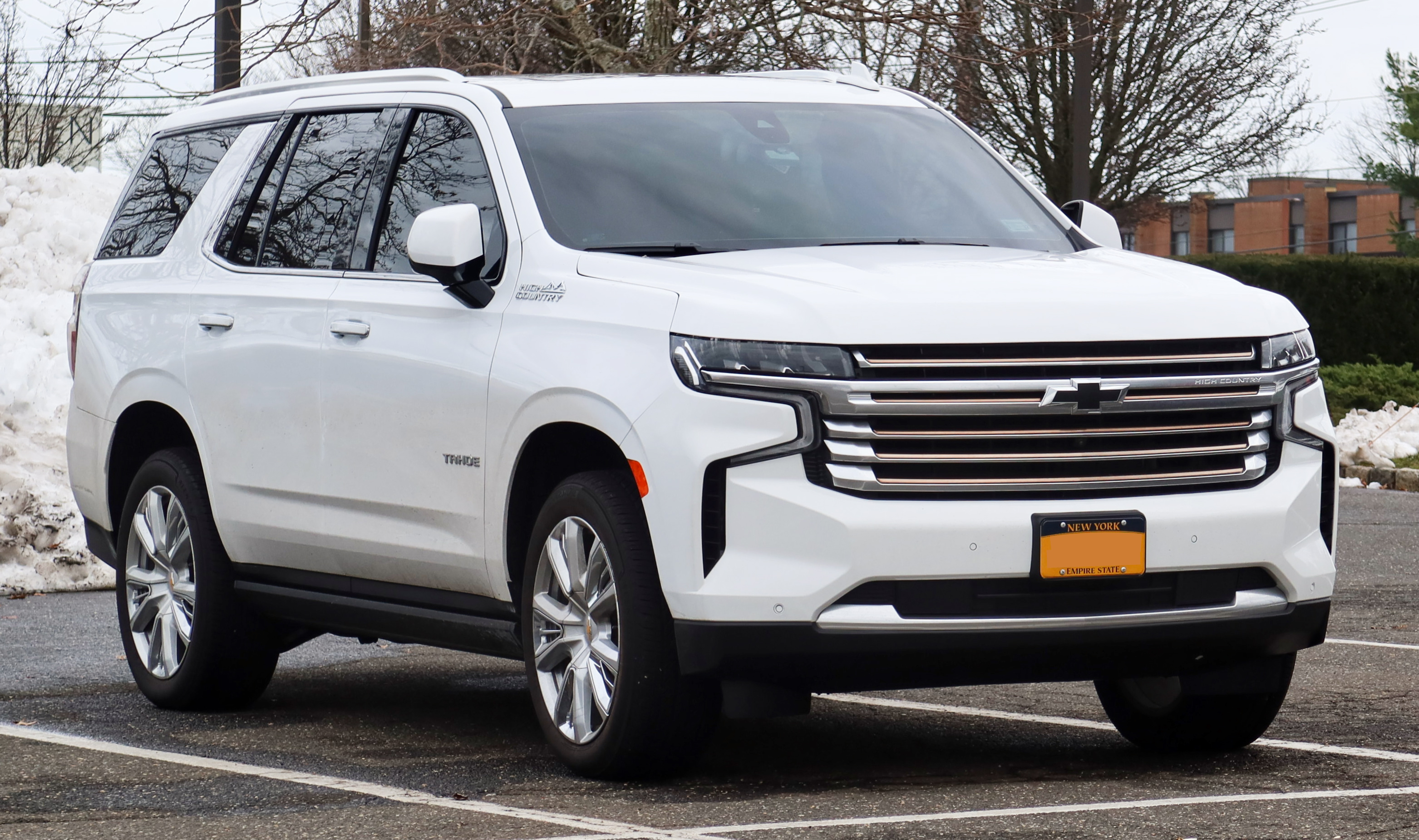
- 2021 Chevrolet Tahoe High Country

Overview
- Also called: GMC Yukon
- Production: May 2020 – present
- Model years: 2021–present 2022–2025 (South Korea)
- Assembly: United States: Arlington, Texas

Body and chassis
- Body style: 4-door SUV
- Layout: Front engine, rear-wheel drive / four-wheel drive
- Platform: GMT T1XX
- Related: Cadillac Escalade/Cadillac Escalade ESV; Chevrolet Suburban/GMC Yukon XL

Powertrain
- Engine: 5.3 L (325 cu in) L84 EcoTec3 V8; 6.2 L (378 cu in) L87 EcoTec3 V8 (Yukon Denali; Tahoe High Country); 3.0 L Duramax I6 engine turbodiesel 2.7 L TurboMax I4 GM L3B engine (China)
- Transmission: 10-speed Hydra-Matic 10L80 automatic

Dimensions
- Wheelbase: 120.9 in (3,071 mm)
- Length: Tahoe: 210.7 in (5,352 mm); Yukon: 210.0 in (5,334 mm)
- Width: 81.1 in (2,060 mm)
- Height: 75.7 in (1,923 mm)
- Curb weight: ≥5,473 pounds (2,483 kg)

On December 10, 2019, Chevrolet introduced a fifth-generation Tahoe at Little Caesars Arena in Detroit, Michigan. This time around, GM chose to introduce the Chevrolet full size SUVs first, followed by the GMC Yukon in January 2020 and the Cadillac Escalade in February 2020. Following the industry shutdown due to the COVID-19 pandemic, the SUVs started production at the Arlington Assembly plant on May 18, 2020, and arrived in dealerships in June 2020.

=== Tahoe ===
Based on the same GMT T1XX platform as the Silverado 1500, the Tahoe distinguishes itself by swapping that truck's live axle and leaf springs for an independent rear multilink suspension setup with coil springs, thus lowering the floor of the vehicle and creating more room in both the cargo area and the second-and third-row seats. The Tahoe expanded its length to 210.7 in (5,352 mm), and the wheelbase to 120.9 in (3,071 mm), making it the largest SUV in the full-size length segment. It gains 11 cubic feet (0.31 m^{3}) of cargo space behind the third row and 10 in (254 mm) of third-row legroom.

Carryover trims include the basic LS, LT, and Premier, with Z71 and RST moving from package to trim level, along with the newly-added top-of-the-line High Country trim, giving the Tahoe the highest number of trims of any vehicle in its segment. Quad exhaust tailpipes are available on LT and standard on Premier and High Country.

Although the Tahoe retains a boxy look, it adds a more rounded design and adopts the same Chevrolet design language as the Silverado, featuring a sharply curved front grille and LED lighting. The Tahoe nameplate is given greater prominence, being placed front and center on the higher liftgate.

The dashboard and entertainment system have been fleshed out, moving away from the traditional design. Newly updated features include a 10.25-inch touch screen that is now standard on all trims and a pair of 12.6-inch LCD rear screens that can play movies and offer content from passengers' smartphones and can play different programs on the two screens. A new push-button shifter column (P, R, N, D) is placed on the dashboard, nine camera displays for enhanced towing capabilities, and a total of 30 additional safety features have been implemented throughout the Tahoe. An Air Ride Adaptive Suspension is standard on the higher trims, likewise with an eight-inch driver screen.

It also features a Duramax diesel engine as an option (available on all trims and packages except for the Z71) for the first time; a 3.0-liter I6 which produces 277 hp (207 kW; 281 PS) and 460 lb⋅ft (624 N⋅m) of torque, a segment-exclusive. The fifth generation Tahoe went on sale in the second half of 2020 as a 2021 model.

Although GM had been making plans to bring the Tahoe to right-hand-drive countries for the first time, those plans were temporarily put on hold for the Australasian region because of low demand for large SUVs and a local company (expected to be Holden Special Vehicles) that was prepared to do the conversions focusing on other productions.

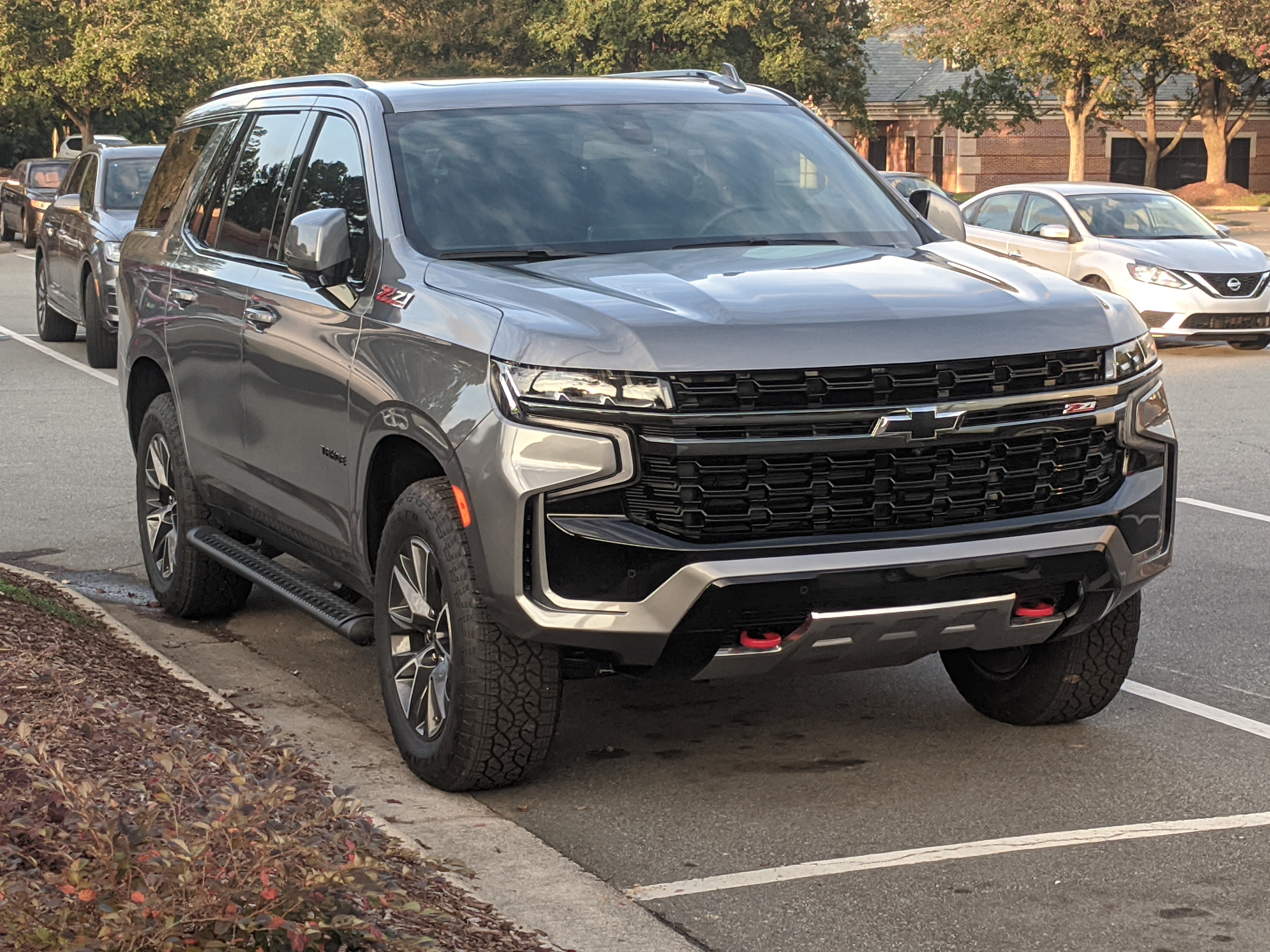
Tahoe Z71 Package

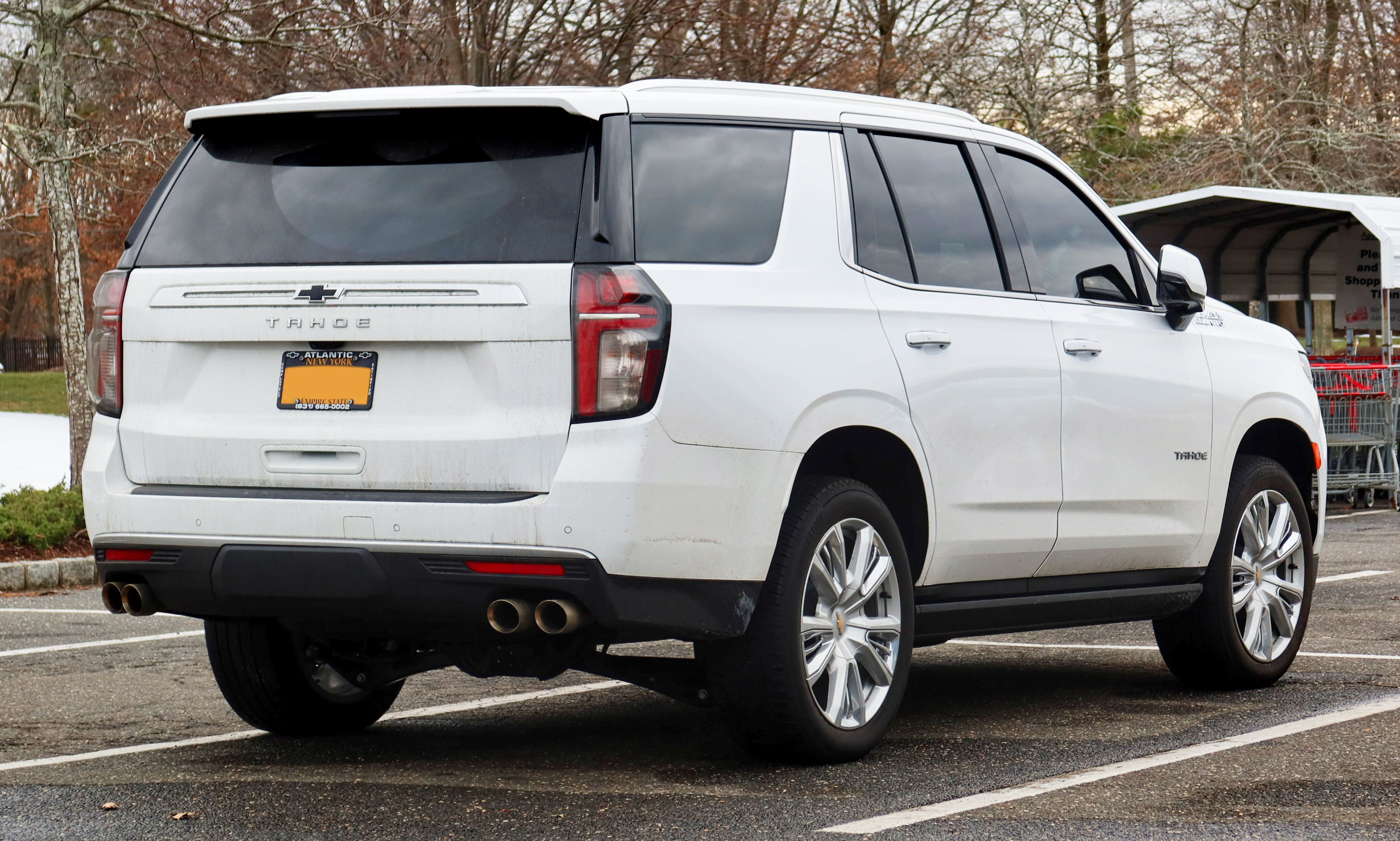
Rear view

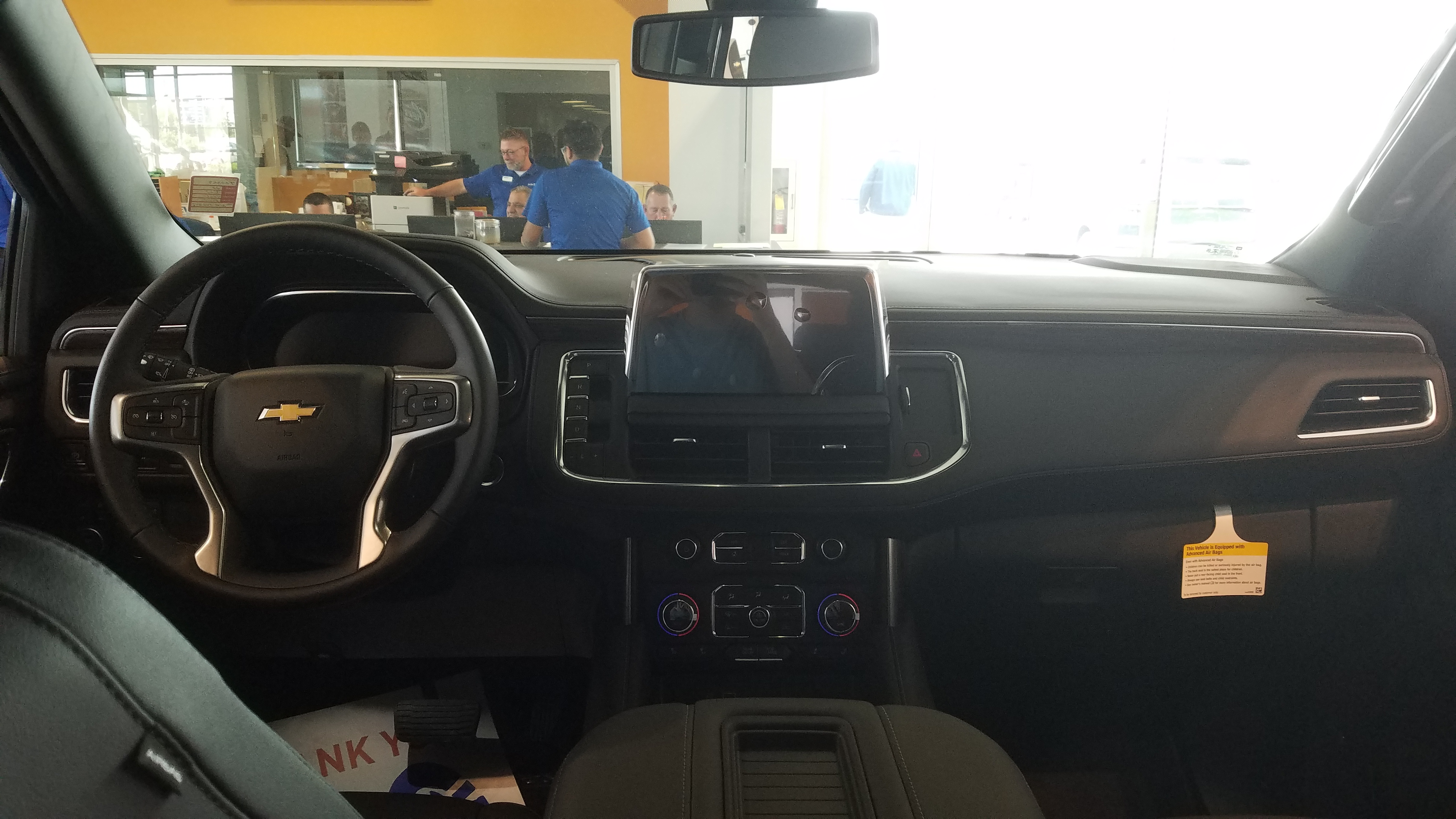
Interior

==== 2025 facelift ====
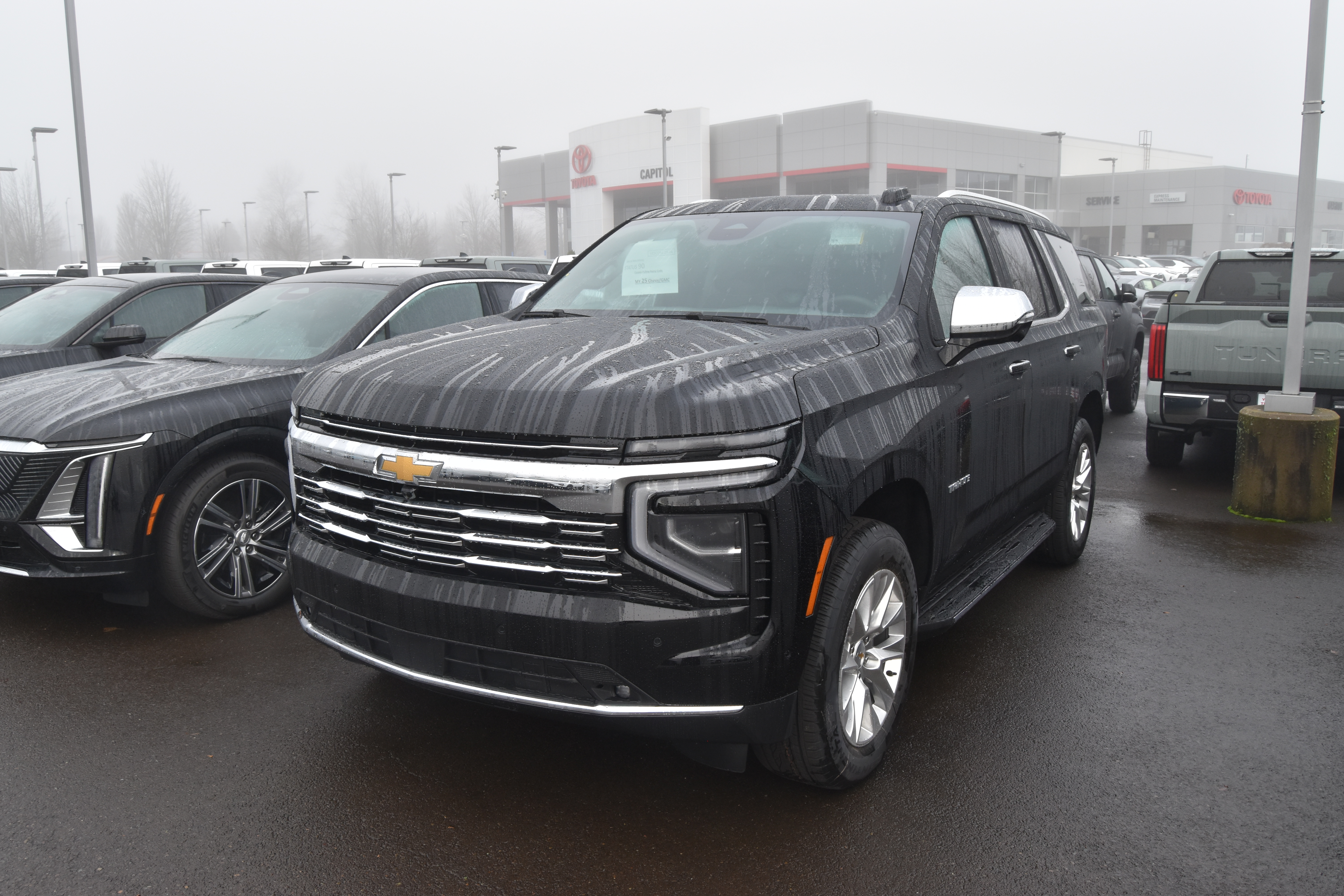
2025 Facelifted Tahoe

The Tahoe received a facelift for the 2025 model year. The facelift includes refreshed front and rear fascias with redesigned LED headlights and LED taillights similar to those from the third-generation 2024 Chevrolet Traverse. Output for the 3.0L Duramax turbodiesel is increased to 305 horsepower (227 kW) and 495 pound-feet (671 N⋅m), and the engine is available on the Z71 trim level for the first time. Other changes include new 24-inch wheels, a revised interior with a standard 17.7-inch-diagonal infotainment screen and redesigned center console, ride and handling improvements, and additional towing and trailering technology. The facelifted fifth-generation Tahoe entered production on October 9, 2024.

=== Yukon ===
GMC unveiled the fifth-generation Yukon in Vail, Colorado on January 14, 2020, alongside its extended length sibling Yukon XL. Like the Tahoe, the Yukon also features an independent rear suspension, a 3.0-liter inline-six turbodiesel engine, and a top-shelf suspension option featuring air springs and magnetic-ride shocks, a standard 5.3-liter V-8, an optional 420 hp (313 kW) 6.2-liter V8, and a 10-speed automatic transmission that is standard across the lineup. It also gains 4.9 inches in the wheelbase. The dashboard has two versions, one similar to the Tahoe while a different one with a larger entertainment screen will be exclusive to the Denali. The Yukon's design follows GMC's design language, with the front grille mimicking the Sierra but the tailgate mimicking the GMC SUV lineup with the lights extended to the tailgate doors.

The lineup of level trims also expanded as well, with the SLE, SLT, and Denali now joined by the 4WD-exclusive AT4, the latter of which comes standard with the Magnetic Ride Control electronically adaptive dampers, AT4-exclusive leather-appointed seats, and stitching with a unique Jet Black interior color and Brandy accents, a heated steering wheel, heated and ventilated front seats, heated second-row outboard seats, a two-speed transfer case, 20-inch Goodyear all-terrain tires, Traction Select System with off-road mode, hill descent control, and skid plates.

The fifth-generation Yukon debuted in July 2020 as a 2021 model.

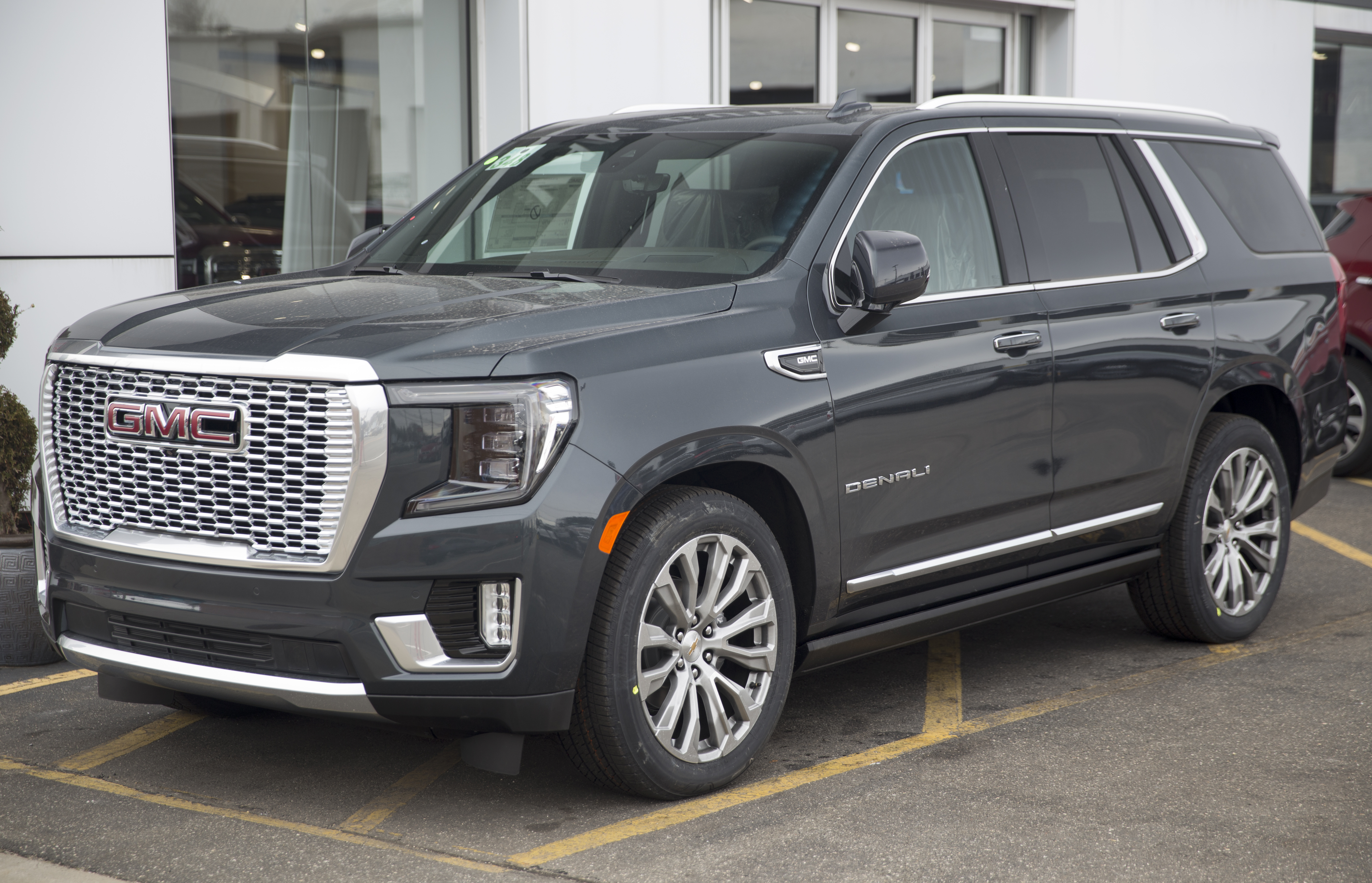
2021 GMC Yukon Denali (front view)

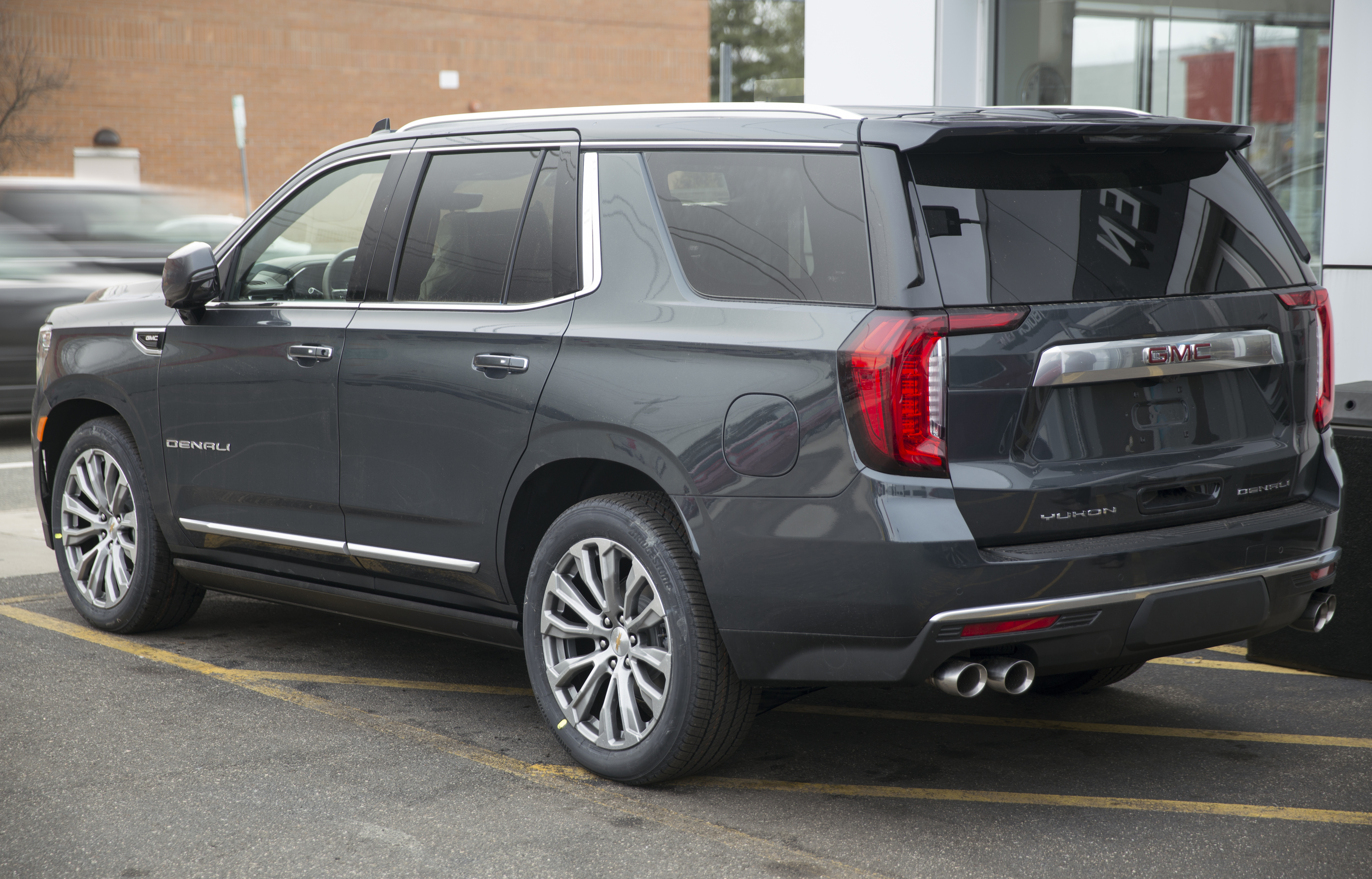
2021 GMC Yukon Denali (rear view)

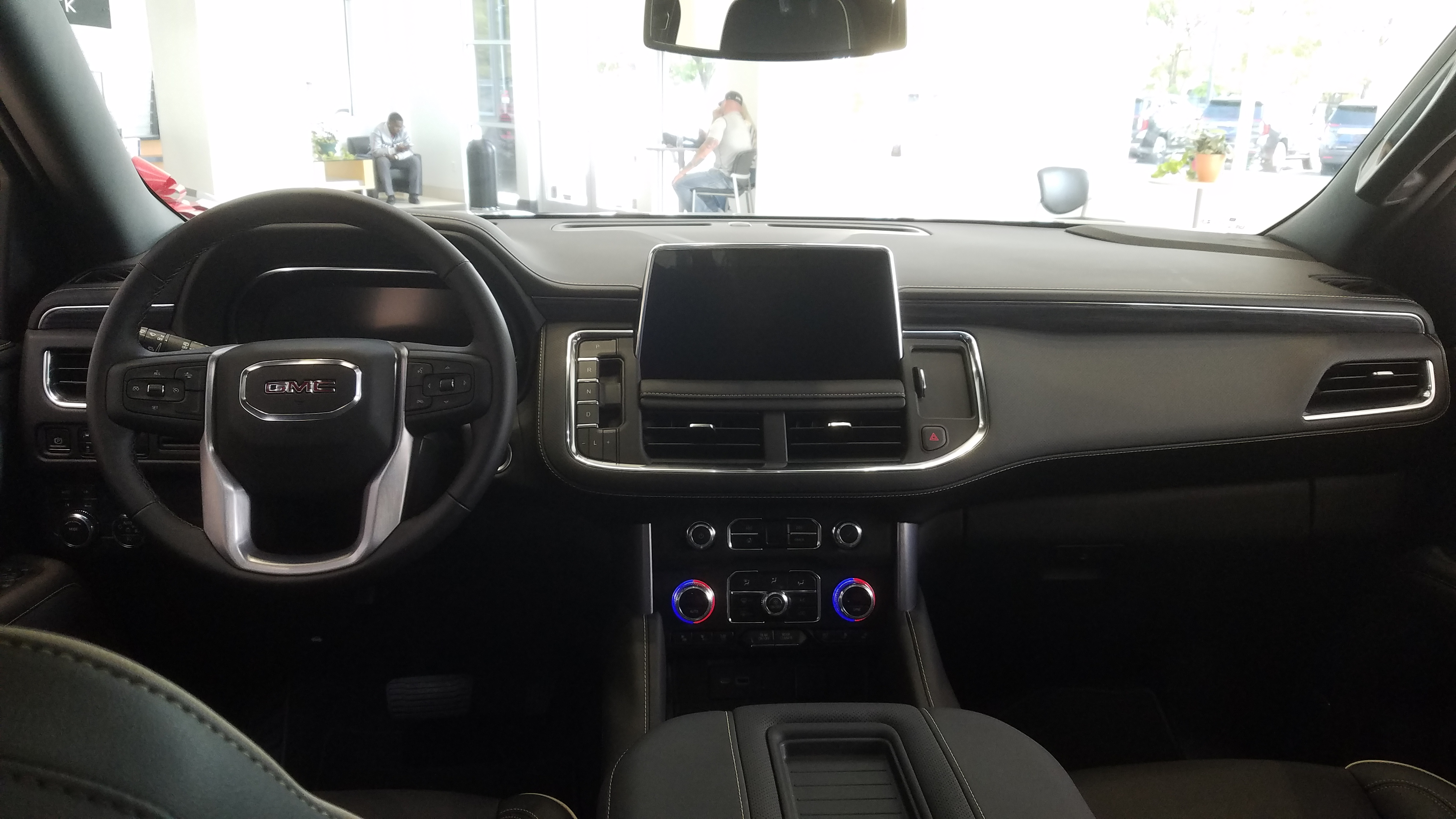
Interior (standard)

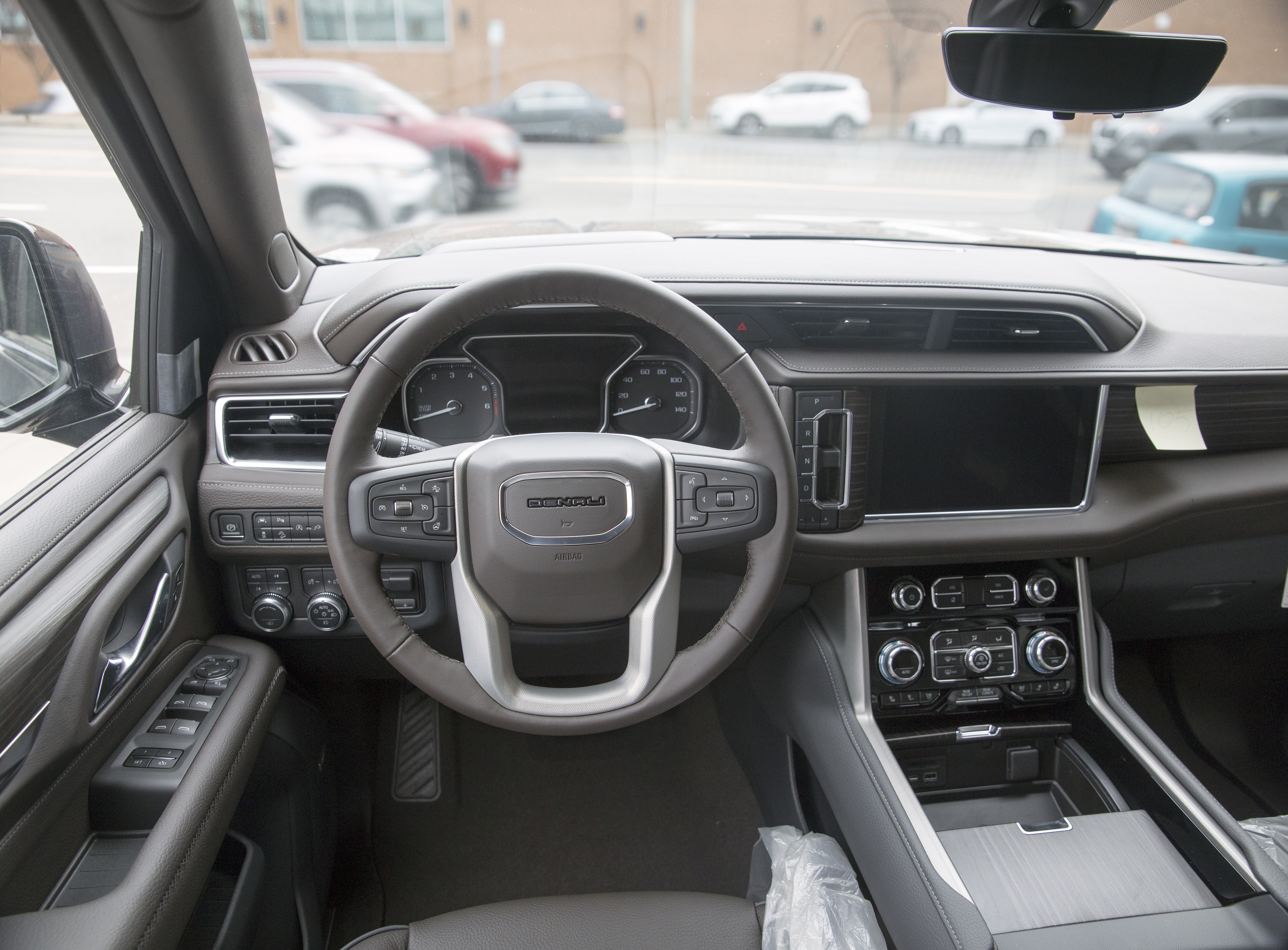
Interior (Denali)

==== GMC Yukon Denali ====
The fifth-generation Yukon Denali was introduced in January 2020. The updated and redesigned vehicle was moved upward in its top-of-the-line level trim, due to the introduction of the AT4 that was slotted above the SLT level. It also featured a dashboard design exclusive to this trim.

==== 2025 facelift ====
The fifth-generation GMC Yukon received a facelift for the 2025 model year. The facelift includes a redesigned front fascia with redesigned LED headlights and LED taillights similar to those from the 2024 GMC Acadia. Other changes include the Elevation trim level being introduced to replace the SLE and SLT trim levels as the entry-level trim, the deletion of the nine passenger seating configuration with first-row bench seating (an available seating option exclusive to the SLE and SLT trim levels on the pre-facelift version of the fifth-generation GMC Yukon), the introduction of the Denali Ultimate and AT4 Ultimate trim levels, new towing technology, and the same upgraded Duramax Diesel engine output seen on the 2025 Tahoe. The facelifted fifth-generation Yukon entered production in November 2024. The smallest wheel size is 20 inches, including on the offroad focused AT4 trim.

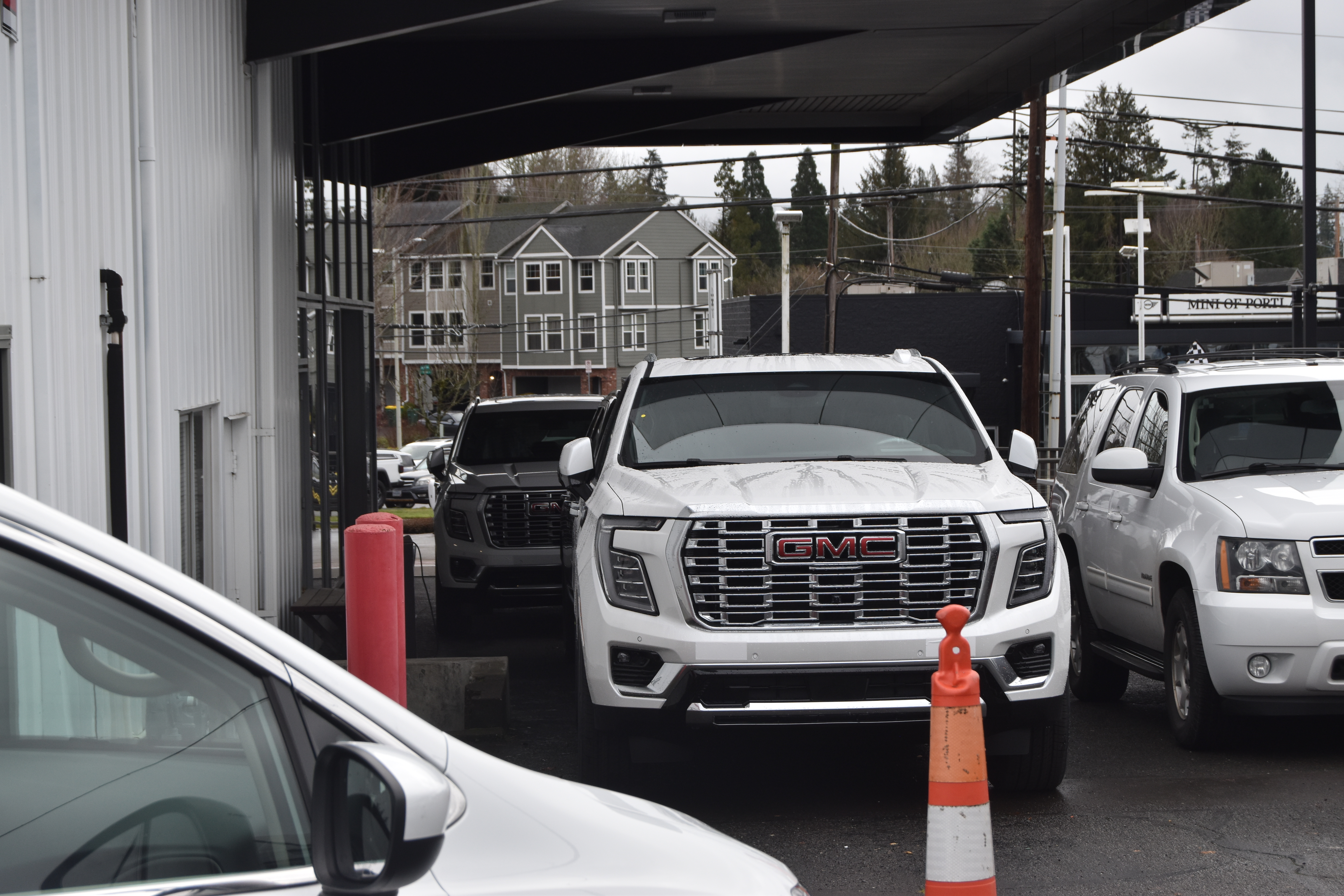
2025 GMC Yukon Denali Facelift

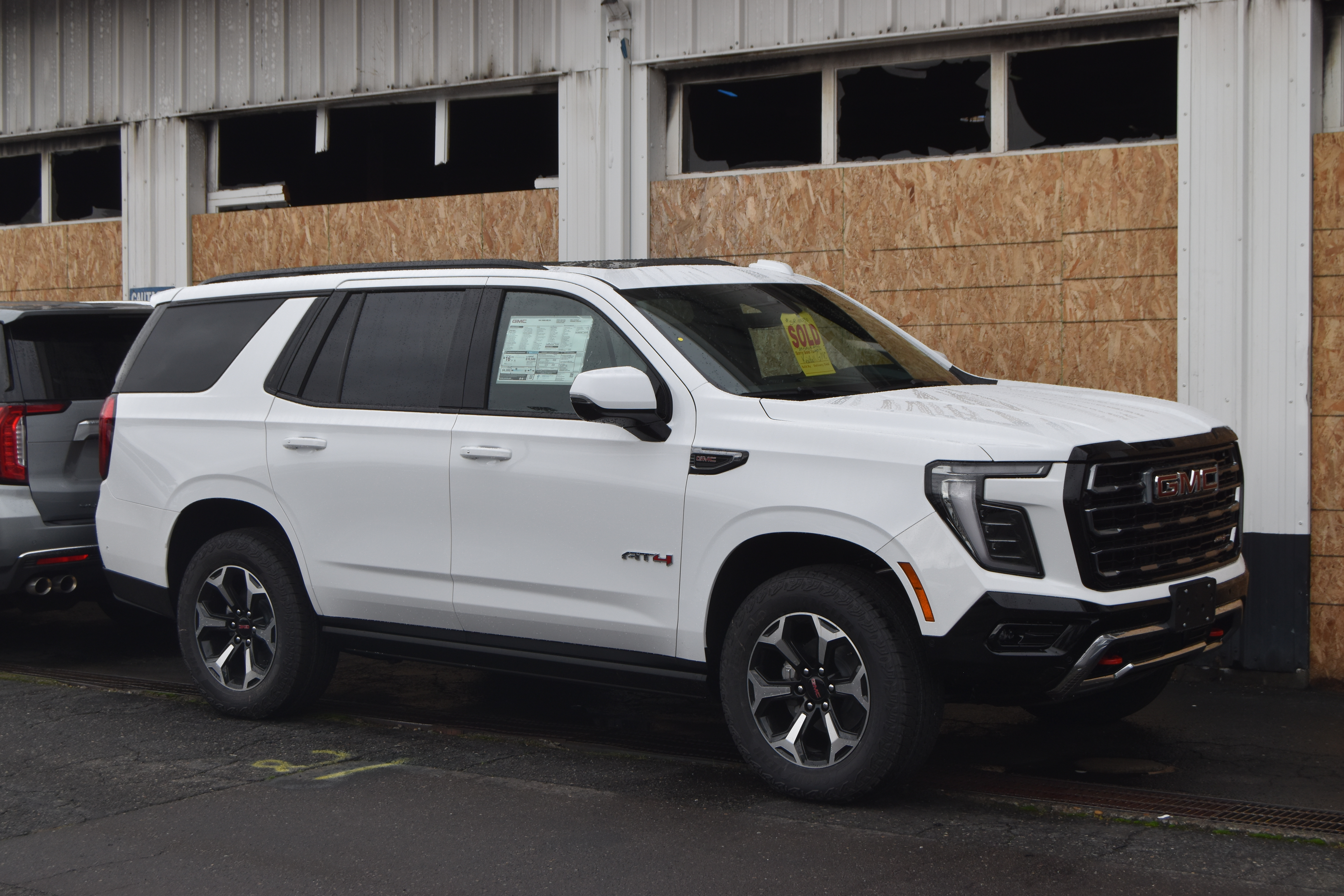
2025 GMC Yukon AT4 Facelift

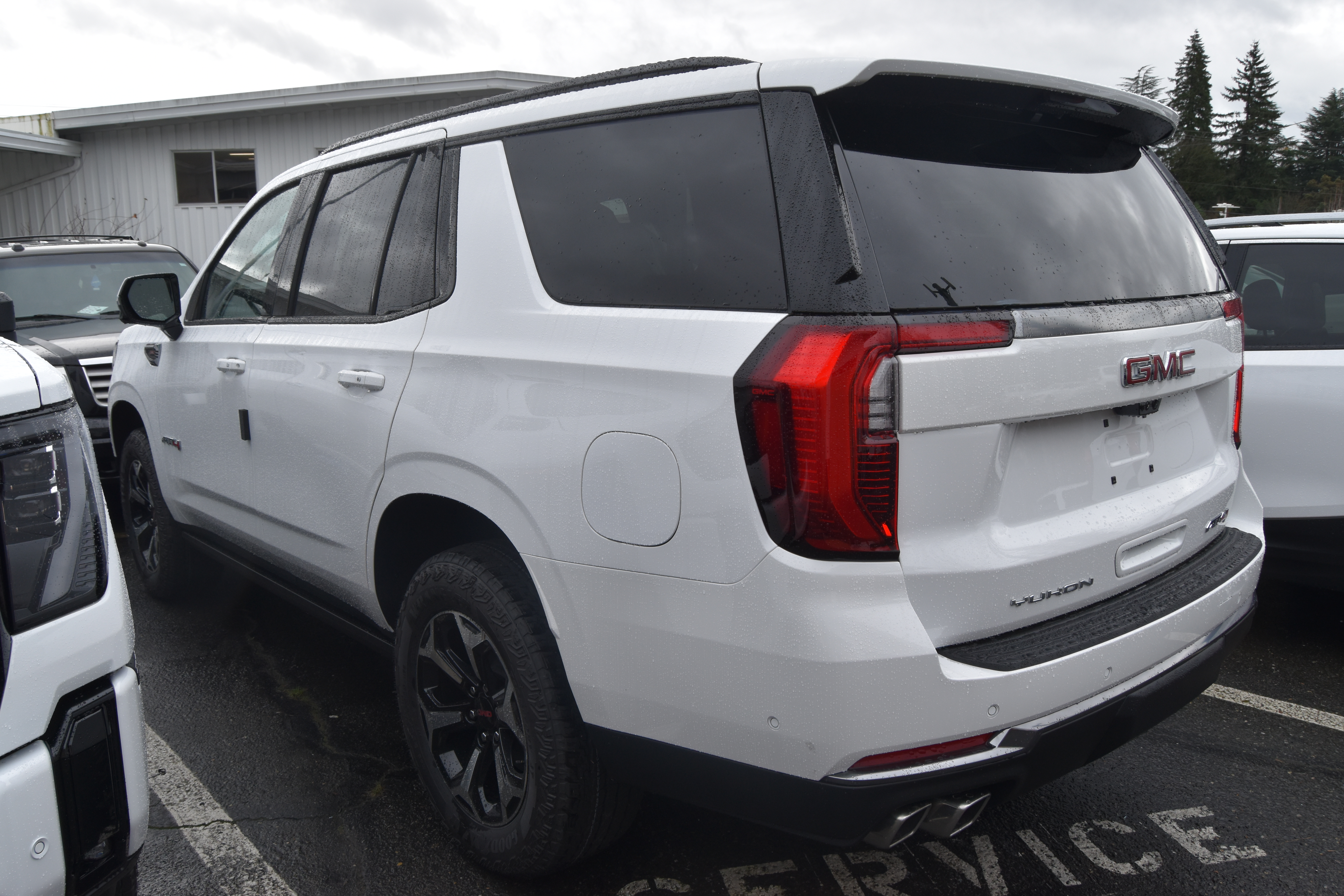
2025 GMC Yukon AT4 Rear view updated taillights

=== Recalls/safety issue ===
On August 3, 2020, GM sent out a new TSB (Technical Service Bulletin) addressing a potential issue related to the engine oil cooler lines on the 2021 Tahoe and Yukon. The issue was sent out to dealerships ahead of receiving the vehicles and were instructed to inspect the engine oil cooler lines at the quick connector on the radiator in order to ensure they were properly seated before selling or dealer-trading the vehicle. No parts were needed for replacement, but GM cautioned customers to have it checked, as catastrophic engine failure could occur if not repaired.

== Hybrid vehicle ==
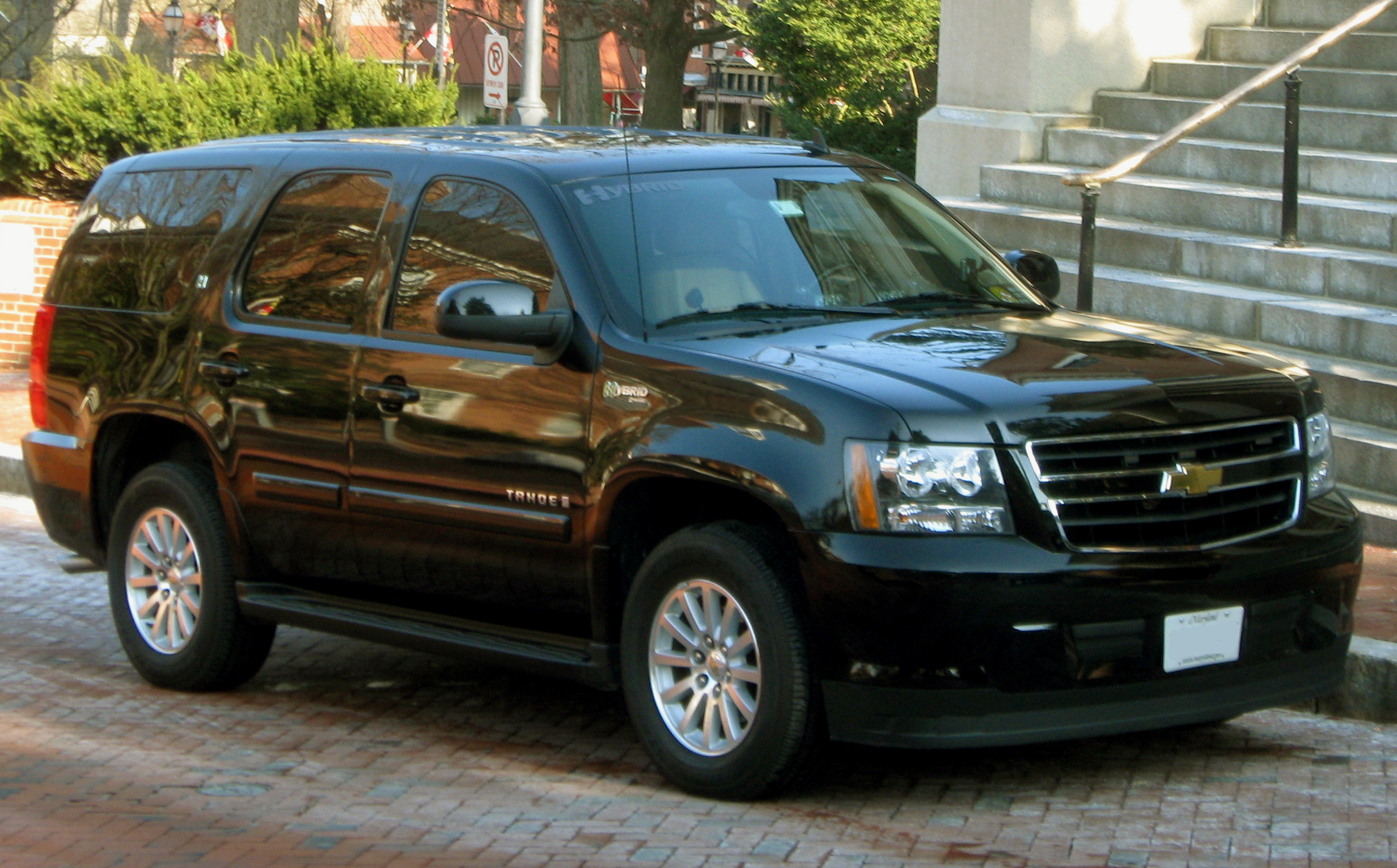
Chevrolet Tahoe Hybrid used by Maryland Governor Martin O'Malley

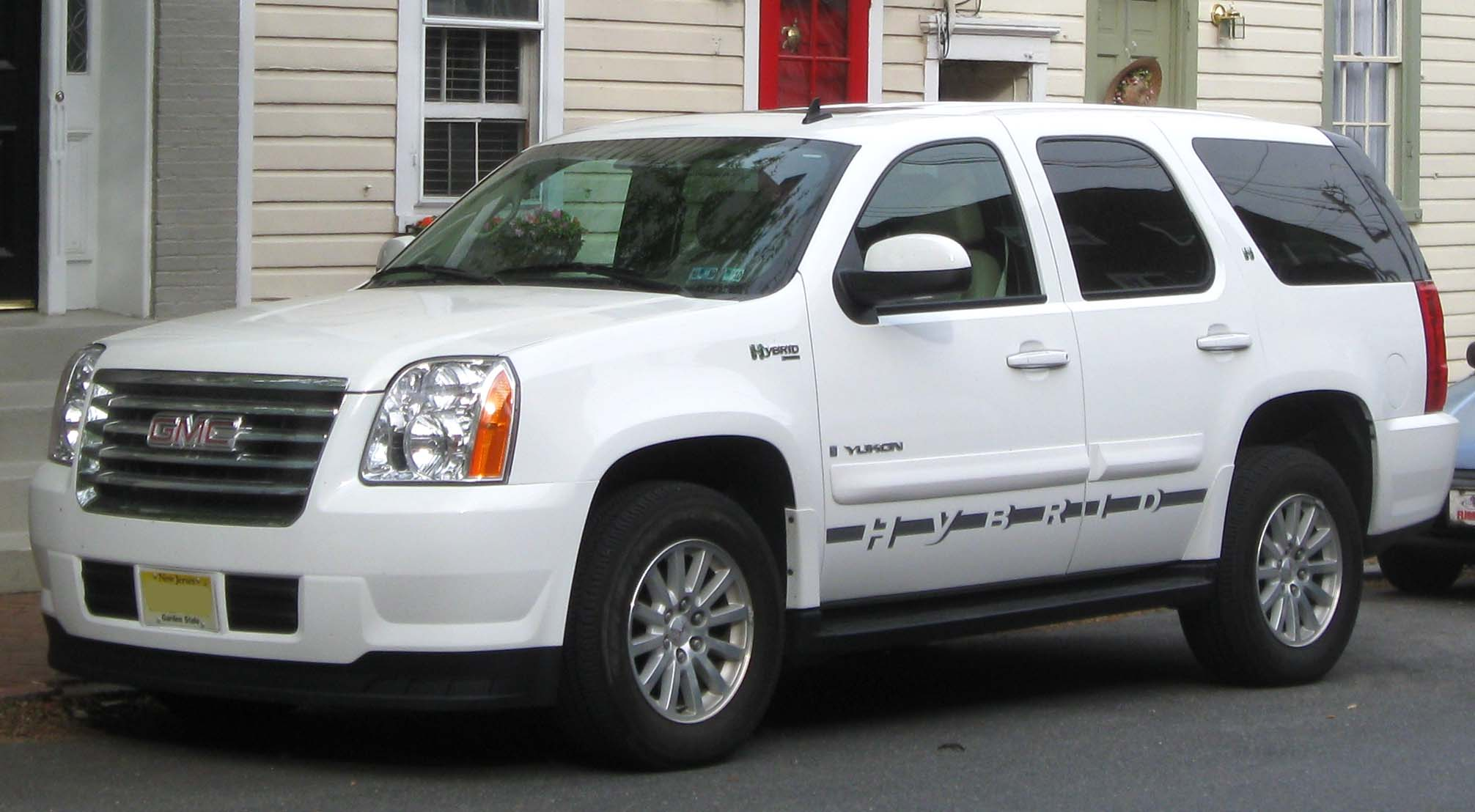
GMC Yukon Hybrid

The Tahoe made its hybrid electric debut in late 2007. In January 2008, the starting price was US$50,540. The starting price of the 2009 model was increased to US$51,405.

The Chevrolet Tahoe Hybrid uses a combination of its 6.0L V8 engine that can also run on V4 mode and two 60 kW (80 hp) (continuous) electric motors with a 300-volt, 1.53 kWh nickel–metal hydride battery. The vehicle can run on either gasoline, electricity, or a mixture of the two using its automatic Two-Mode Hybrid system that monitors the vehicle's torque and state of the battery to choose the most efficient source of power. The battery is charged either directly by generating electricity through driving one or both electric motors using the gasoline engine (while the vehicle is coasting or being driven by the gasoline engine), or by the wheels driving one or both electric motors through regenerative braking when the vehicle is decelerating, thus regaining some of the energy invested in forward momentum. The Tahoe is considered a strong or full hybrid, in that it can run entirely on the battery (for a limited range) at low speeds. In city driving, the EPA rating of fuel consumption for the 2WD version of the hybrid is 21 mpg_{‑US} (11 L/100 km; 25 mpg_{‑imp}). In comparison, non-hybrid varieties of the Tahoe are rated no higher than 15 mpg_{‑US} (16 L/100 km; 18 mpg_{‑imp}) in city driving. In highway driving, the EPA rating is 22 mpg_{‑US} (11 L/100 km; 26 mpg_{‑imp}).

The Tahoe and Yukon Hybrid models were discontinued after the 2013 model year as GM moved to make its SUVs more fuel-efficient with the introduction of the EcoTec engine that would later be installed in the 2015 Tahoe and Yukon.

== Outside North America ==
=== South America ===
In Brazil, the Tahoe GMT400 was sold under the name of "Grand Blazer", sourced from Argentina with rear-wheel drive only, regionally-sourced 6-cylinder engines (the late-type 4.1L MPFI Chevrolet straight-6 gasoline and the 4.2L MWM Sprint 6.07T diesel) and manual transmission. The GMT400 is used by Brazilian elite police units, such as the BOPE (Batalhão de Operações Policiais Especiais) in Rio de Janeiro and the ROTA (Rondas Ostensivas Tobias de Aguiar) and GATE (Grupo de Ações Taticas Especiais) in São Paulo. It is also used by the São Paulo State Police and the Rio Grande do Sul State Police. But as the cars grew old, the great majority of them were substituted, mainly by the smaller Chevrolet Blazer midsize SUV. The Tahoe name was not used in Brazil, as it would be unfamiliar to most Brazilians since it refers to the Lake Tahoe on the border of Nevada and California.

Elsewhere in South America, Chile has incorporated the Tahoe as a transport vehicle for the special operations unit (GOPE) of the Chilean Police (Carabineros de Chile) to carry communication equipment.

The Tahoe was also assembled in Venezuela from CKD kits for three generations, being phased out in 2014 along most of the local Chevrolet range due to unfavorable economic conditions and political circumstances. The fourth generation of the Tahoe has not been available in Venezuela.

In Ecuador, due to the tax benefits offered by hybrid vehicles, the third-generation of the Tahoe was offered only in the hybrid version until 2011. A review of the benefit to exclude hybrid vehicles with a displacement greater than 1.8L rendered the Tahoe Hybrid less cost-effective than the non-hybrid in Ecuador.

=== South Korea ===
GM sold the Chevrolet Tahoe in South Korea starting with the 2022 model year, surpassing the Traverse as the largest Chevrolet vehicle in that country's Chevrolet lineup. The Korean-spec Tahoe was exclusively available in the High Country and Dark Night Edition trim levels only and is powered by the 6.2L L87 V8 petrol engine as its only engine option for that country. It was not available with the Duramax I6 diesel engine. All Korean-spec Tahoe SUVs were manufactured at the Arlington Assembly plant. Sales of the Tahoe in that country began on April 18, 2022. In 2024, the Chevrolet Tahoe (along with GM Korea's other imported Chevrolet SUV models, the Chevrolet Equinox and the Chevrolet Traverse) was withdrawn from the South Korean market due to poor sales, and the facelifted 2025 Tahoe was not launched in that country. Despite this, GM continues to sell the Cadillac Escalade sibling in South Korea due to better sales.

=== Australia ===
The GMC Yukon launched in Australia in 2025 as part of the GM-operated General Motors Specialty Vehicles (GMSV) business. It is converted to right-hand drive by Walkinshaw Group. In 2026, a supercharger kit for the 6.2 L V8 engine was released, developed with Harrop Performance. It produces 500 hp (373 kW) and 526 lb⋅ft (713 N⋅m) when measured at the hubs, with naturally aspirated V8 producing 349 hp (260 kW) and 387 lb⋅ft (525 N⋅m) when measured at the hubs.

=== China ===
In early 2024, GM began selling the Chevrolet Tahoe in China for the 2025 model year. The Tahoe was the first vehicle in China to be powered by GM's new TurboMax engine (the only powertrain option available on the Chinese-market Tahoe). Unlike most Chinese-market GM vehicles (which are manufactured locally in China by SAIC-GM), the Chinese-market Tahoe was imported from GM's Arlington Assembly plant located in Arlington, Texas, and was the first GM vehicle sold under The Durant Guild imported vehicle platform (which is aimed at selling imported GM vehicles in China). The Chinese-market Tahoe was available in two trim levels, Base (which is based on the North American-market Chevrolet Tahoe RST) and High Country.

In November 2024, General Motors added GMC vehicles to its lineup in The Durant Guild, with the 2025 GMC Yukon. The Chinese-market GMC Yukon was available in Denali and Denali Ultimate trim levels. Just like the Chinese-market Tahoe, the Chinese-market Yukon was imported from GM's Arlington Assembly plant in Texas, and was powered by GM's TurboMax engine.

After just one year, GM halted exports to China in mid-2025, amid new tariffs and trade conflicts between the US and other countries, including China.

== Police package ==
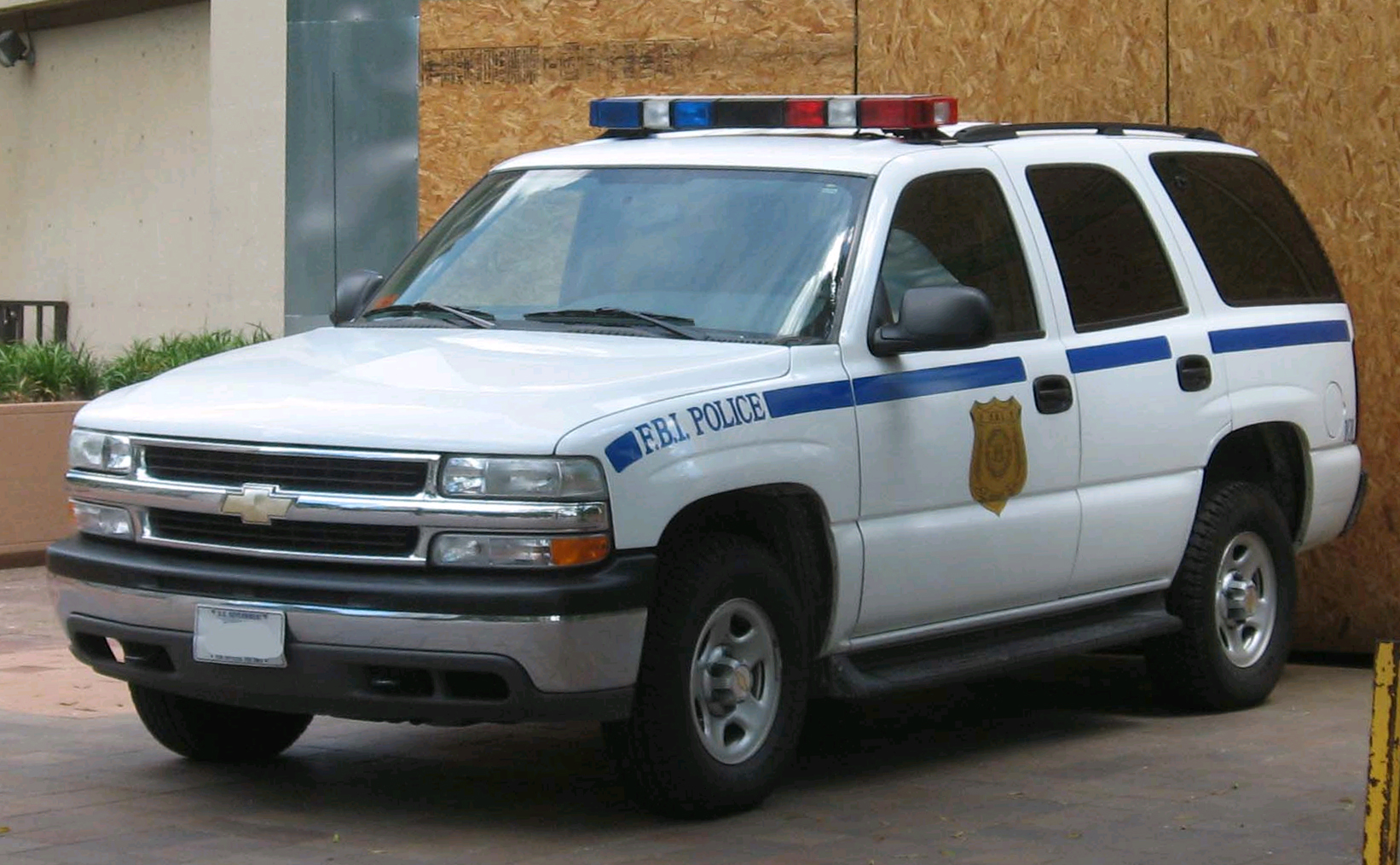
GMT800 Chevrolet Tahoe Police package used by the FBI Police

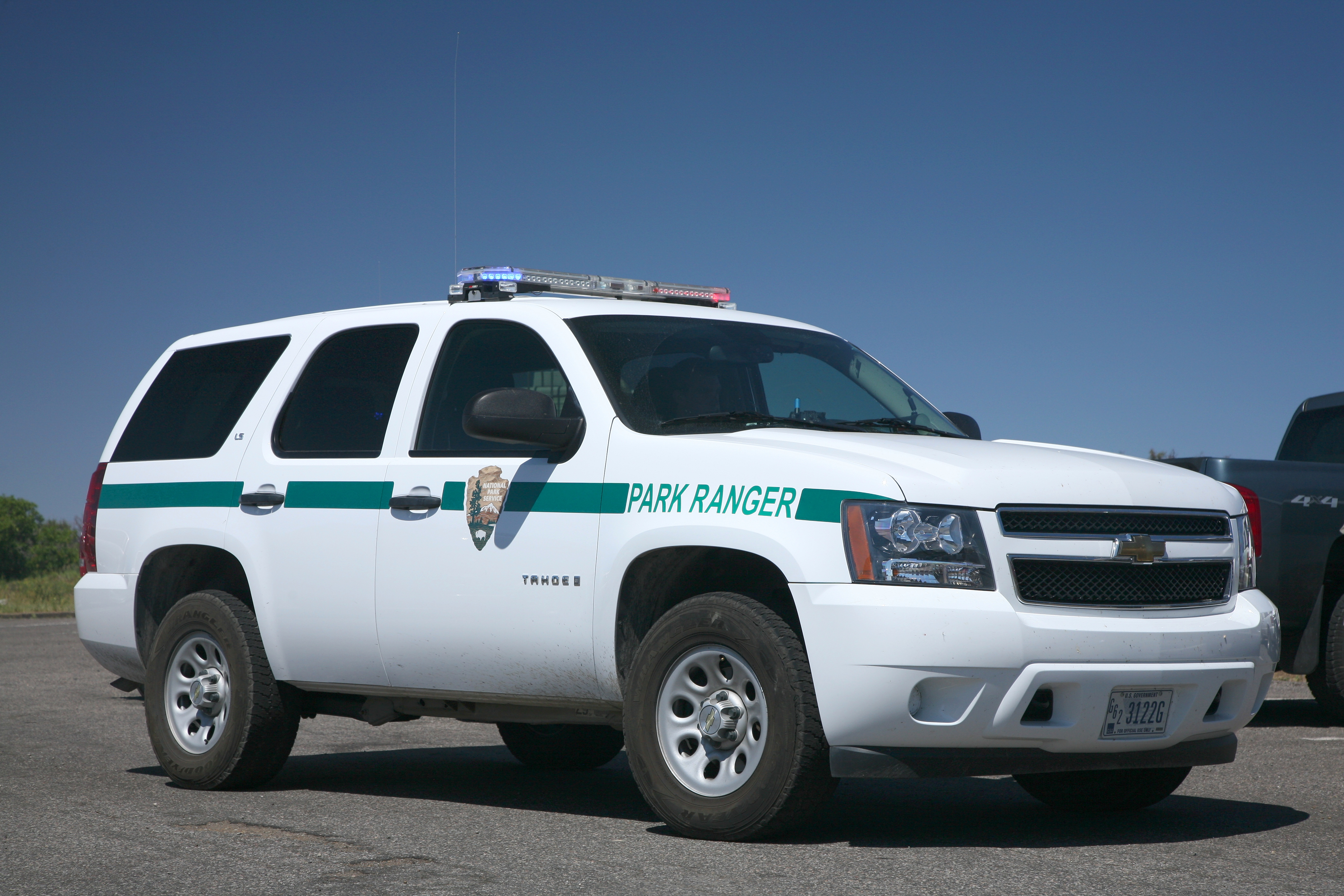
GMT900 Tahoe used by the National Park Service

In North America, the Tahoe is used by many law enforcement agencies, park rangers, fire departments, and EMS agencies. Prior to the announcement of the Z56 police package model, the civilian base and LS models based on the GMT400 were used in police service. During the 1997 model year, the Tahoe was offered with the Z56 police option using suspension components from the discontinued 454SS truck – the first Tahoe Z56s were available only in 2WD until the GMT400 was phased out. The original prototype had rear disc brakes based on the B-body 9C1s whereas the production Z56s came with rear drum brakes. Plans for outfitting the Tahoe with the Z56 police package originated around the 1994 model year when GM broke news about phasing out its B-platform sedans (Caprice, Impala SS, Roadmaster) at the end of the 1996 model year where a replacement was imminent since GM ended production of its body-on-frame passenger sedans amid growing SUV sales. Since the introduction of the GMT900, Chevrolet currently offers two versions of the police package Tahoe: a four-wheel-drive version and a two-wheel-drive version. Just like the GMT400-based models, civilian GMT800 Tahoe base and LS models were also used for police use until the Z56 police package option was reintroduced in 2004, late in the GMT800's life cycle by some agencies.

Chevrolet refers to the four-wheel-drive (4WD) version as "Special Service Vehicle" (SSV) which has the 5W4 RPO code. This version of the Tahoe can be used for all purposes except pursuits and high-speed responses because of its high center of gravity just below the front window (height, not location), thus having a higher probability of rolling-over at high speeds. This version is preferred by agencies where snow, ice, flooding, rough terrain, and ground clearance are common issues.

Chevrolet refers to the two-wheel-drive (2WD) version—also known as the rear-wheel-drive (RWD) version—as "Police Pursuit Vehicle" (PPV). This version can be used for all purposes including pursuits and high-speed responses. The center of gravity in this vehicle is lower than that of the four-wheel-drive version and the ground clearance is about 1 in (25 mm) less, with a standard rear bumper replacing the tow hitch on civilian Tahoes. Highway patrol agencies prefer the two-wheel-drive version, where pursuits and long-distance responses are more common. As of the 2012 model year, the Tahoe was the last body-on-frame, rear-wheel-drive police vehicle manufactured for the United States market since Ford phased out its aging Panther platform. Other SUVs like the Ford Expedition are used by many law enforcement and EMS agencies, but are not pursuit-rated.

Chevrolet built a 2015 Tahoe Police Patrol Vehicle that was previewed as a concept at the 2013 SEMA Show in Las Vegas. The vehicle became available in 2WD and 4WD drivetrains with orders coming in the first quarter of 2014 for special service models, followed by the orders for the police pursuit models afterwards.

=== 2021 PPV ===
The 2021 Tahoe PPV marked the most drastic change from the standard Tahoe. Rocker covers were borrowed from the GM LT4 engine found in high-performance Corvettes, Camaros, and Cadillacs. Engine and transmission coolers were PPV-specific. Bridgestone co-developed Firehawk Pursuit tires with GM for the 20-inch steel wheels. Six-piston, 16-inch rotor Brembo brakes were standard-issue on the PPV. The suspension was lowered and further fortified. All-wheel drive became standard and sent to the front as needed with a limited slip clutch in the transfer case. The alternator almost doubled the amperage of the standard Tahoe. This version of the PPV uses the 9C1 code instead of the Z56 code.

Unlike the standard Tahoe, the 2021 Tahoe PPV (along with the related Commercial/Fleet model) includes a standard eight-inch Chevrolet Infotainment touchscreen in lieu of the 10.25-inch unit found on all other models. It also does not include wireless Apple CarPlay or Android Auto (although still offers wired versions of both), SiriusXM Satellite Radio with 360L, or the Google-based operating system (on 2022 and newer models). A standard 4.2-inch color LCD screen is also included with an analog instrument cluster in lieu of the ten-inch full-color LCD instrument cluster on 2022 models.

== Military applications ==
LSSV
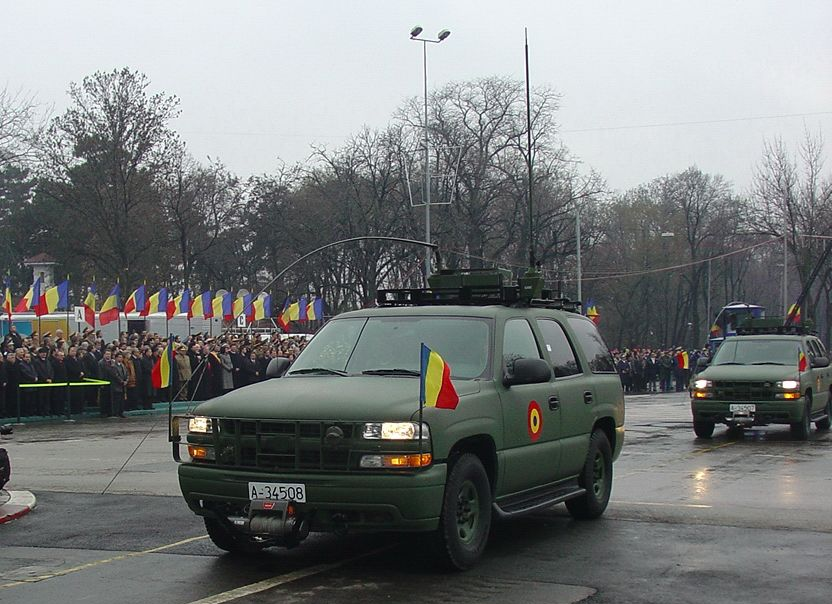

Overview
- Manufacturer: General Motors, AM General
- Model years: 2001–present

Body and chassis
- Body style: 2-door SUV; 4-door SUV; 2-door pickup 4-door pickup
- Platform: GM GMT880 platform

Powertrain
- Engine: 5.3 L V8 (Tahoe) LSSV; 6.0L V8 (Suburban) LSSV; 6.6L Duramax turbo diesel V8 (pickup) LSSV
- Transmission: 4-speed 4L60-E/4L80-E automatic 5-speed Allison 1000 automatic

When production of the CUCV II ended in 2000, GM redesigned it to coincide with civilian truck offerings. The CUCV nomenclature was changed to Light Service Support Vehicle in 2001. In 2005, LSSV production switched to AM General, a unit of MacAndrews and Forbes Holdings. The LSSV is a GM-built Chevrolet Silverado 2500 HD, Chevrolet Tahoe, or Chevrolet Suburban that is powered by the 5.3 L V8 for the Tahoe, 6.0 L V8 for the Suburban, and a Duramax 6.6 L V8 turbo diesel engine for the pickup trucks. As GM has periodically redesigned its civilian trucks and SUVs since 2001, LSSVs have also been updated cosmetically.

The militarization of standard GM trucks/SUVs to become LSSVs includes exterior changes such as CARC paint (Forest Green, Desert Sand, or three-color Camouflage), blackout lights, military bumpers, a brush guard, a NATO slave receptacle/NATO trailer receptacle, a pintle hook, tow shackles and a 24/12-volt electrical system. The dashboard has additional controls and dataplates. The truck also can be equipped with weapon supports in the cab, cargo tie down hooks, folding troop seats, pioneer tools, winches, and other military accessories. In the Canadian Army, these vehicles are nicknamed "Milverados".

The Enhanced Mobility Package (EMP) option adds an uprated suspension, four-wheel anti-lock brakes, a locking rear differential, beadlock tires, a tire pressure monitoring system and other upgrades. About 2,000 LSSV units have been sold to U.S. and international military and law enforcement organizations.

=== Variants ===
- Cargo/Troop Carrier Pickup (2-door, Extended Cab, or 4-door Silverado)
- Cargo/Troop Carrier/Command Vehicle (4-door Tahoe)
- Cargo/Troop Carrier/Command Vehicle/Ambulance (4-door Suburban)

== Yearly American sales ==
Effective 2018, sales of the GMC Yukon XL are reported together with the GMC Yukon. Sales figures for the Yukon XL prior to 2018 are listed with the Chevrolet Suburban.

Calendar year	Tahoe	GMC Yukon	Total U.S. sales
1998	133,235	49,355	182,590
1999	122,213	53,280	175,493
2000	149,834	56,297	206,131
2001	202,319	77,254	279,573
2002	209,767	76,488	286,255
2003	199,065	86,238	285,303
2004	186,161	86,571	272,732
2005	152,307	73,458	225,765
2006	161,491	71,476	232,967
2007	146,259	63,428	209,687
2008	91,578	39,064	130,642
2009	73,254	29,411	102,665
2010	75,675	28,781	104,456
2011	80,527	34,250	114,777
2012	68,904	27,818	96,722
2013	83,502	28,302	111,804
2014	97,726	41,569	139,295
2015	88,342	42,732	131,074
2016	103,306	53,447	156,753
2017	98,961	49,183	148,144
2018	104,153	80,784	178,829
2019	101,189	74,673	175,862
2020	88,238	63,440	151,678
2021	106,030	84,242	190,272
2022	105,756	82,304	188,060
2023	110,328	82,271	192,599
2024	105,147	87,312	192,459
2025	114,202	93,036	207,238
