= Cheetah MMPV =

Cheetah
- Type: Infantry mobility vehicle
- Place of origin: United States

Production history
- Designer: FPI
- Manufacturer: Force Protection, Inc.
- Produced: 2007–2008
- No. built: 13 prototypes

Specifications
- Mass: 17000lbs (empty) with base armor
- Length: 18 ft (5.4 m)
- Width: 7 ft 7 in (2.3 m)
- Height: 7 ft 5 in (2.26 m)
- Crew: 1 (gunner) +4
- Armor: STANAG 1 at 17000lbs to STANAG 3 at 23000lbs
- Main armament: remote weapon station
- Engine: Cummins ISB series Cummins QSB series 220 KW (300 HP) (ISB) (275HP) (QSB)
- Payload capacity: 5000 lbs
- Transmission: Allison 2500 SP automatic
- Suspension: 4×4 wheeled
- Ground clearance: 18"
- Fuel capacity: 55 gal
- Operational range: 500 mi
- Maximum speed: 75 mph (122 km/h), 89mph burst

The Cheetah MMPV (Medium Mine Protected Vehicle) was a prototype built by the Force Protection, Inc., division of General Dynamics. It was intended as part of Force Protection's armoured military vehicle line-up, which includes the MRAP-class of Buffalo and Cougar vehicles and the Ocelot light protected patrol vehicle (LPPV).

Its design was based on the South African RG-31 Charger class of light-armored vehicle, intended as a reconnaissance, forward command and control, and urban operations vehicle for homeland security missions.

No contracts were procured for the Cheetah MMPV, and production ended in 2008 after 13 prototypes had been manufactured.

== Specifications ==
- Transfer case: Marmon-Herrington 2 Speed with 4X4 or optional ADM
- Wheels: Hutchinson aluminum two-piece CTIS ready
- Tires: Michelin XZL run flat tires 365/80R20
- Electrical System: 24 V
- Approach angle: 45°
- Departure angle: 45°
- Turning radius: 27’
- Gradient: 60%
- Side Slope: 30%
- Fording Depth: 48"
- Center of Gravity: 35"

== Production history ==
The Cheetah never went into full production.

In early 2007, Force Protection stated that full production could begin in July 2007, but did not proceed after the May 2007 announcement that the US Marine Corps had ordered 1200 of the rival International MaxxPro vehicles. At the same time Force Protection received an order for 14 of the larger MRAP Category III Buffalo.

Cheetah was submitted to the Joint Light Tactical Vehicle (JLTV) competition but was officially rejected from the program in August 2008. The JLTV program settled on the Oshkosh L-ATV in August 2015.

== See also ==
- Buffalo
- Cougar
- RG-32M Scout
- RG-31 Charger
- MRAP (armored vehicle)
- Joint Light Tactical Vehicle

== Sources ==
- Cheetah MMPV Technical Data Sheet and Pictures to Army Recognition
