= Chevrolet Silverado (first generation) =

Series of trucks by General Motors

First generation
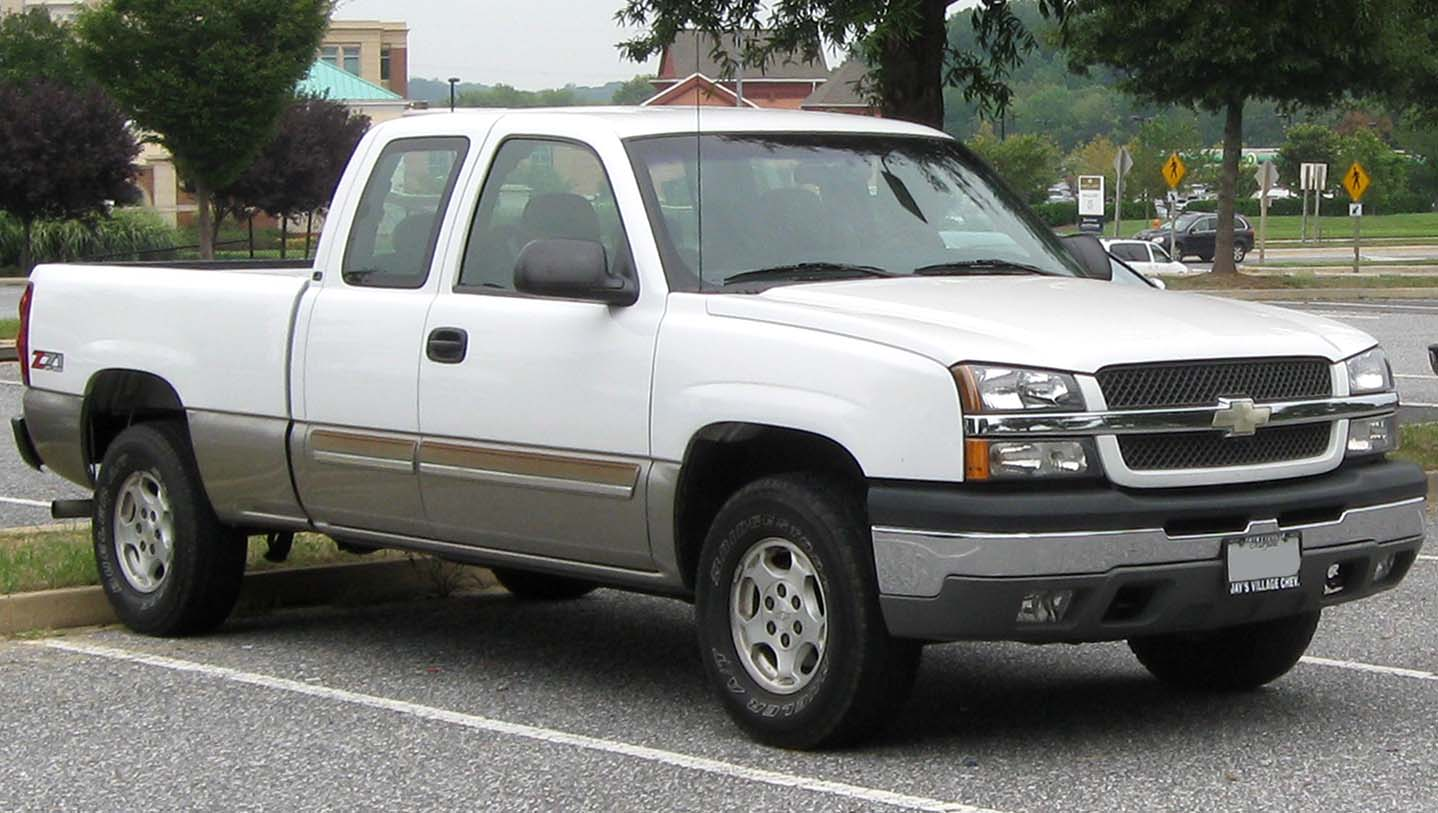
- 2003–2005 Silverado 1500 Extended Cab w/Z71

Overview
- Production: June 1998 – 2007
- Model years: 1999–2006 (1500); 1999–2004 (2500); 2001–2006 (HD); 2007 (Classic; all models)
- Assembly: United States: Roanoke, Indiana (Fort Wayne Assembly); Flint, Michigan (Flint Truck Assembly); Pontiac, Michigan (Pontiac East Assembly); Canada: Oshawa, Ontario (Oshawa Truck Assembly); Mexico: Silao, Guanajuato (Silao Assembly)
- Designer: Wayne Cherry (1994, 1995); Ken Sohocki (1994, 1995)

Body and chassis
- Platform: GM GMT800 platform

Powertrain
- Engine: 4.3 L Vortec 4300 V6; 4.8 L Vortec 4800 V8; 5.3 L Vortec 5300 V8; 6.0 L Vortec 6000 V8
- Transmission: 4-speed 4L60-E automatic 4-speed 4L65-E automatic 4-speed 4L80-E automatic 5-speed NV3500 manual 5-speed NV4500 manual
- Hybrid drivetrain: MHEV (Silverado Hybrid)

Dimensions
- Wheelbase: 119 in (3,023 mm); 133 in (3,378 mm); 143.5 in (3,645 mm)
- Length: Standard Cab, Short Box: 203.3 in (5,164 mm); Standard Cab, Long Box: 222.2 in (5,644 mm); Extended Cab, Short Box: 227.8 in (5,786 mm); Extended Cab, Long Box: 246.7 in (6,266 mm); Crew Cab, Short Box: 232.2 in (5,898 mm); Hybrid: 230.2 in (5,847 mm)
- Width: 78.5 in (1,994 mm)
- Height: 74 in (1,880 mm); 77 in (1,956 mm); Hybrid 2WD: 71.2 in (1,808 mm); Hybrid 4WD: 73.9 in (1,877 mm)

Chronology
- Predecessor: Chevrolet C/K (fourth generation)
- Successor: Chevrolet Silverado (second generation)

The first generation of the Chevrolet Silverado is a series of trucks manufactured by General Motors from 1998 until 2007 under the Chevrolet brand and also as the GMC Sierra. Built on the new GMT800 platform, the Silverado/Sierra 1500 and 2500 pickup trucks were first released in August 1998 as 1999 models. The "classic" light-duty GMT400 C/K trucks were kept in production alongside the new types for the first model year, while the heavy-duty GMT400 pickups (as well as the GMT400 SUVs) were continued until 2000, with the new GMT800 Silverado/Sierra HD (Heavy Duty) released in model year 2001. A 3500 model was added later for 2001, with the introduction of the HD moniker (though it was not until the 2007 GMT900 model year a 3500HD debuted). A refresh for 2003 models was introduced in 2002, bringing slight design changes and an upgrade to the audio and HVAC controls. The 2007 GMT800 trucks, built after the new GMT900 had gone on sale, used the name Classic to denote the difference between the two generations.

== Development ==
In January 1993, GM began development on the GMT800 pickup program with numerous teams coming together. A new design was chosen and finalized for production in June 1995, 36 months ahead of the scheduled start in June 1998. Development sign-off was issued in late 1997, with pre-production and series production commencement in June 1998.

== Light duty ==
There are a number of models of light-duty Silverados and Sierras, including the half-ton, three-quarter-ton, SS, Hybrid, and Denali.

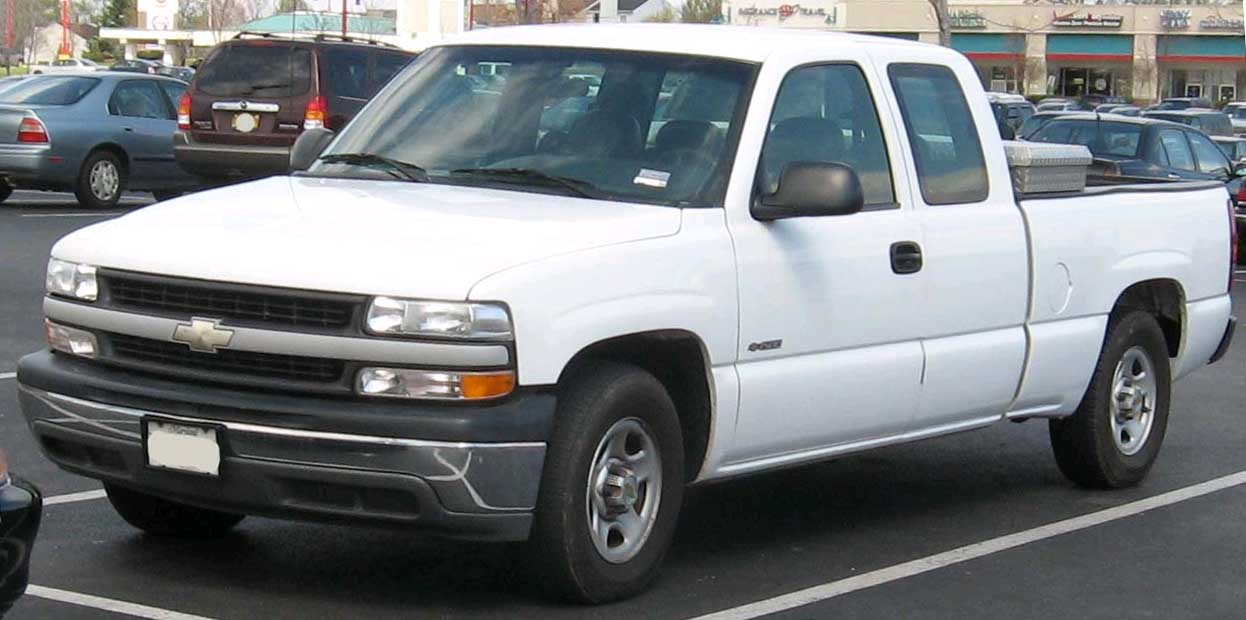
1999–2000 Silverado 1500 Extended Cab

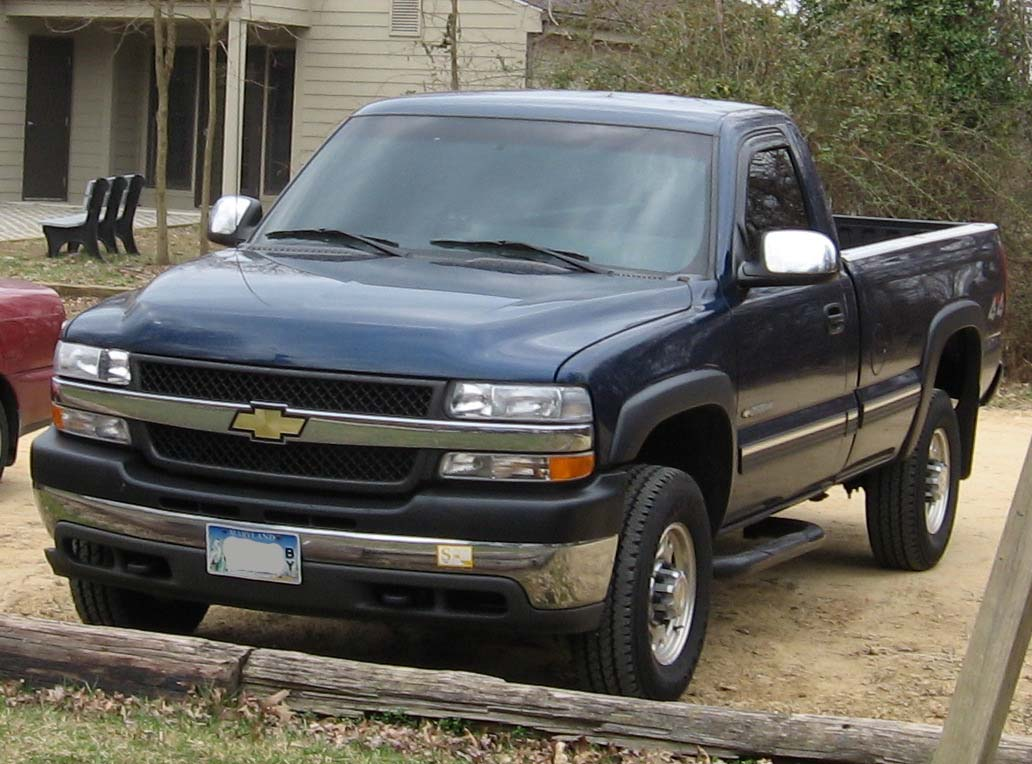
2001–2002 Silverado 2500HD Regular Cab

The light-duty trucks used the 1500 and 2500 names. They are available in three cab lengths: a 2-door standard/regular cab, 3- or 4-door extended cab, and for 2004, a full front-hinged 4-door crew cab (derived from the 2001 HD trucks). Three cargo beds are available: a 69.2 in (1,758 mm) short box, 78.7 in (1,999 mm) standard box, and a 97.6 in (2,479 mm) long box. The short bed is only available with the crew cab and 2006–2007 extended cab. The standard box was also available with the Stepside box. They were available in three trim levels: Base/SL, LS/SLE, and LT/SLT, with the latter only being available with the extended or crew cab, 5.3 L or larger V8, and automatic transmission. The 2500 series was initially available in two GVWRs: 7,200 and 8,600 pounds, with the former option only available on 2WD regular-cab long-bed or extended-cab short-bed models.

The Z71 off-road package, only available on 1500 4×4 models, received 46mm gas-charged shock absorbers, jounce bumpers, stabilizer bars, skid plates, and a high-capacity air cleaner.

For the first two years, only a regular cab and 3-door extended cab were available (the 4-door extended cab was added for 2000), along with the 4.3 L V6 and the new LS-based 4.8 L, 5.3 L, and 6.0 L V8 engines (a continuation of the 6.5 L Detroit turbo diesel engine on 2500 trucks was planned, but ultimately cancelled) paired to a 5-speed manual or 4-speed automatic transmission. The 4.3 L, 4.8 L, and 5.3 L were only available in the 1500 series trucks, with the latter also being available with the 2500 series at 7,200 pounds GVWR. The 4.3 L was only available on regular cabs and low-trim 2WD extended cabs with Fleetside box and 6.5' bed. and the 6.0 L was only available on the 2500 series trucks. Also, the manual transmission was only available with the 4.3 L or 4.8 L on the 1500 series or with the 6.0 L on the 2500 series at 8,600 pounds GVWR.

For 2001, the Silverado was available with the lighter-weight Pro-Tec Composite Box; it was only available on select extended-cab short-bed Fleetside models. Also, the 3-door extended cab and 2500 series with 7,200-pound GVWR were discontinued. All 2500 models now featured torsion-bar front suspension.

GM introduced a minor revised version of the Silverado and Sierra for the 2003 model year, with a new front end influenced by GM's own Cadillac Escalade of the same generation (except the Escalade did not have a horizontal bar), and a slightly updated rear end.

For 2004, a crew-cab/short-box configuration was added to the lineup to be sold alongside the crew-cab/standard-box 1500HD. Sharing the same wheelbase as the extended-cab/6.5' box model, it was only available with the 5.3 L V8 engine (a 4.8 L V8 was added for 2006). On the Sierra, the 4.8 L V8 engine was discontinued from the SLT trim.

For 2005, extended-cab/standard-box 1500 4×4 trucks were available with the higher-output, all-aluminum L33 5.3 L Vortec engine, in place of the LM7. During the 2005 model year, all 1500-series GMT800 pickups (except Hybrid and Denali models) reverted to front disc/rear drum brakes as a cost-cutting measure; heavy-duty trucks and the SUVs retained their 4-wheel vented disc brakes.

For 2006, the Silverado received another slight revision, and all models received the grille and hood that were introduced on the previous year's 2500HD and 3500 models (the Sierra remained unchanged). In addition, the Chevrolet logotype emblem on the bottom-right of the tailgate was removed (though base-trimmed models still had the larger Chevrolet logotype decal on the tailgate). Its SUV counterparts, the Suburban, Tahoe, and Yukon/Yukon XL, retained the use of the pre-facelift sheet metal (except in Mexico). The LT trim became available on regular cabs, The Sportside bed was also discontinued for 2006.

The Insurance Institute for Highway Safety (IIHS) gave the Silverado an overall "marginal" score on the frontal offset crash test for poor structural integrity and poor dummy control, although no injuries were recorded on the dummy's body regions.

=== 2001 GMC Sierra C3/2002–2007 Denali ===
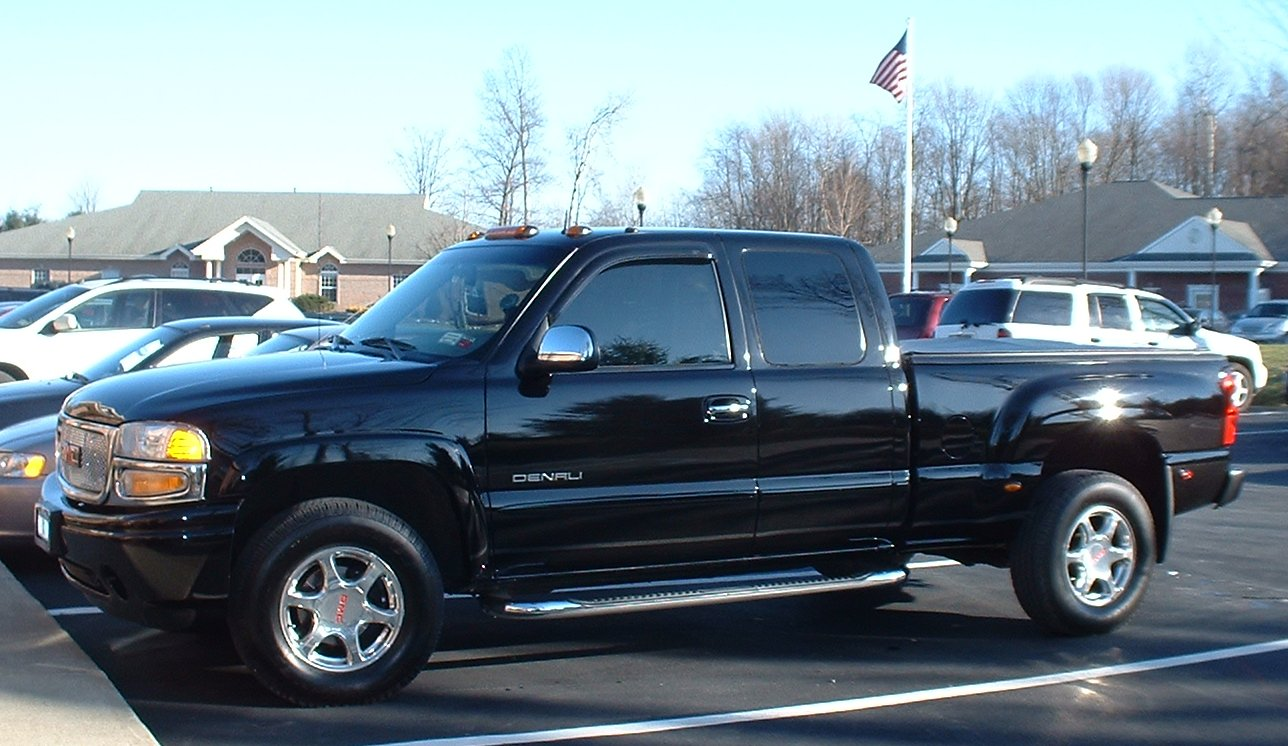
Sierra Denali with Quadrasteer

GMC built an upscale version of its Sierra 1500 for 2001, called the Sierra C3. It used all-wheel drive with a 3.73:1 final drive gear ratio and included the 6.0 L Vortec 6000 LQ4 V8 rated at 325 hp (242 kW) at 5000 rpm and 370 lb⋅ft (502 N⋅m) of torque at 4000 rpm. It was coupled to a 4L60E-HD 4-speed automatic transmission along with other upscale equipment. For 2002, the name was changed to Sierra Denali (in line with the Yukon Denali), but the specifications remained essentially the same except for the addition of Quadrasteer and GM changed from the 4L60E-HD to the 4L65E in conjunction with a 4.10:1 final drive gear ratio.

The Denali was rated for towing 10,000 pounds (4,500 kg) and hauling 1,840 pounds (830 kg) in the cargo box.

The Sierra Denali was initially equipped with Delphi's Quadrasteer system as standard equipment. It was a four-wheel steering system that greatly reduced the truck's turning radius and improved lane changing while towing. General Motors dropped Quadrasteer from the Sierra Denali after the 2004 model year and its entire lineup after 2005, citing poor sales of this expensive option.

=== Chevrolet Silverado SS ===
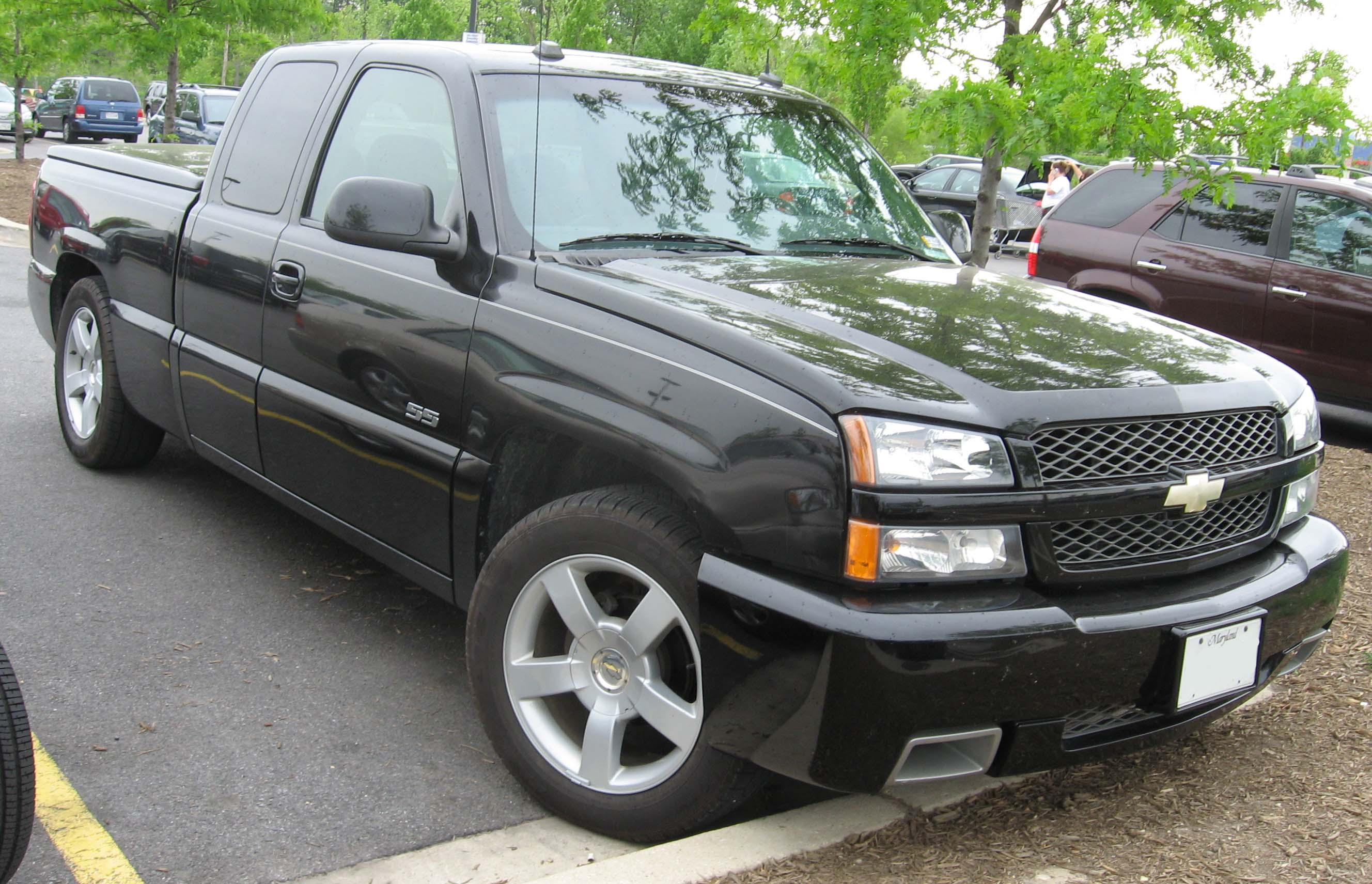
2003–2005 Silverado SS

Launched in early 2003, the Silverado SS is a factory high-performance truck. Based on the Silverado 1500 Extended Cab with a 6.5' Fleetside box, it features upgrades in the drivetrain and both exterior and interior appearance, and included the 6.0-liter Vortec High-Output (LQ9) V8 rated at 345 hp (257 kW) at 5200 rpm and 380 lb⋅ft (515 N⋅m) of torque at 4000 rpm coupled to a 4L65E four-speed automatic transmission. This was the same engine used for the second-generation Cadillac Escalade and GMC Yukon Denali. Chevrolet and GMC advertised this engine as the "Vortec High Output" and later as the "VortecMAX," while Cadillac called it the "HO 6000." The SS came with a standard all-wheel drive setup with a 4.10 final drive gear ratio and 4-wheel disc brakes. In 2005, in an attempt to increase sales, a two-wheel-drive version became available (the 2WD SS also lost its rear disc brakes in favor of drums, as did the rest of the 1/2-ton GMT800 pickups). 2005 was also the first year the sunroof was available in the SS lineup. In 2006, the AWD variant was dropped, and rear-wheel drive was the only drivetrain available. In a further effort to reduce cost, buyers could also choose cloth interior and/or a bench seat. The Silverado SS also came with the Z60 performance suspension and 20-inch aluminum wheels. All SS trucks used the torsion-bar style front suspension for better handling. SS trucks were only available from the factory in Black, Victory Red, and Arrival Blue Metallic from 2003 to 2004. For 2005, Arrival Blue Metallic was replaced by Silver Birch Metallic (as done with other trims as well).

=== Intimidator SS ===
In 2006, Chevrolet released a special-edition Silverado SS under the name "Intimidator SS" (licensed by Dale Earnhardt, Inc.) to honor the late Dale Earnhardt. The truck came with several minor appearance upgrades (rear spoiler, embroidered headrests, Intimidator custom badging), but was essentially a standard Silverado SS. Of the 1,033 scheduled trucks, only 933 were made (the remaining 100 were sold as 2007 Silverado SS "Classic" body style trucks before the 2007 MY changeover to the new GMT900. These trucks were only available in Black exterior but could be ordered with either cloth or leather interior.

=== Vortec High Output/Vortec Max ===
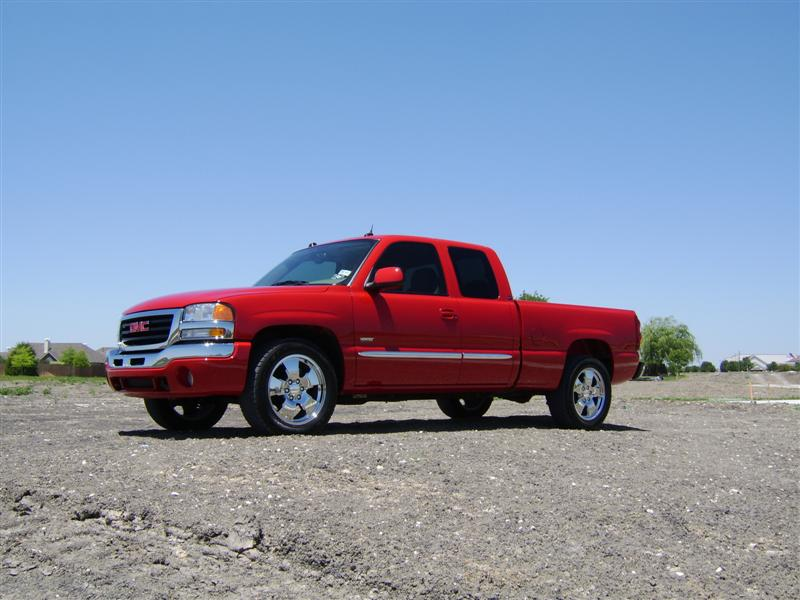
2004 GMC Sierra with VHO package

The Vortec High Output (VHO) option was first introduced in 2004 to a limited market (mainly consisting of Texas and several surrounding areas); it was available nationwide for MY 2005. It was available for both the Silverado and Sierra 1500 series trucks. This special edition package (under option code B4V) included several options previously not found on the standard 1500 model, most notably the LQ9 6.0L V8 engine (the same used for the Silverado SS, the Cadillac Escalade, and GMC Yukon Denali). The LQ9 was rated at 345 hp (257 kW) at 5200 rpm and 380 lb⋅ft (515 N⋅m) of torque at 4000 rpm, which were the same specifications as in the SS models. The B4V package could only be ordered on extended-cab standard-box 4×2 trucks. They were all built at the Canadian assembly plant and were equipped with the Z60 High Performance suspension package, in addition to the M32 (4L65E transmission), GT4 (3.73 rear gear), and G80 (Eaton locking differential) as standard equipment. The 2004 models were equipped with the standard 10-bolt 8.625" rear end. The 2005 models were upgraded with the larger 14-bolt 9.5" rear end under RPO code AXN. The package also included one style of the newly introduced GM 20-inch wheels installed from the factory. This marked the first time the LQ9 engine was available on a two-wheel-drive application. Unlike the previous years with the SS package, interior choices ranged from basic cloth to fully loaded. There were also more exterior color options available with this package.

For 2006, the Vortec Max (stylized as VortecMAX) trailering package became available. The Vortec Max package was added to the option list with an array of similar features and new badges, and at its core retained the LQ9/4L65-E powertrain. However, the Vortec Max package differed from the Performance edition in that it also came with a variant of the Z85 Handling/Trailering suspension, as well as 17-inch wheels and tires under the option code NHT (and was available on 4×4 and 4×2 models) versus the Z60 High Performance Suspension and 20-inch wheel and tire package of the regular B4V (which was limited to 4×2 trucks). This was because the Vortec Max package was intended for high-capacity trailer towing, while the Performance Edition was intended more for customers who wanted the Silverado SS mechanicals, but did not want the visuals of one. It was also made available (in addition to the extended cab) on crew cab models. Towing capacity with the Vortec Max trailering package was 10,800 pounds.

=== Hybrid ===
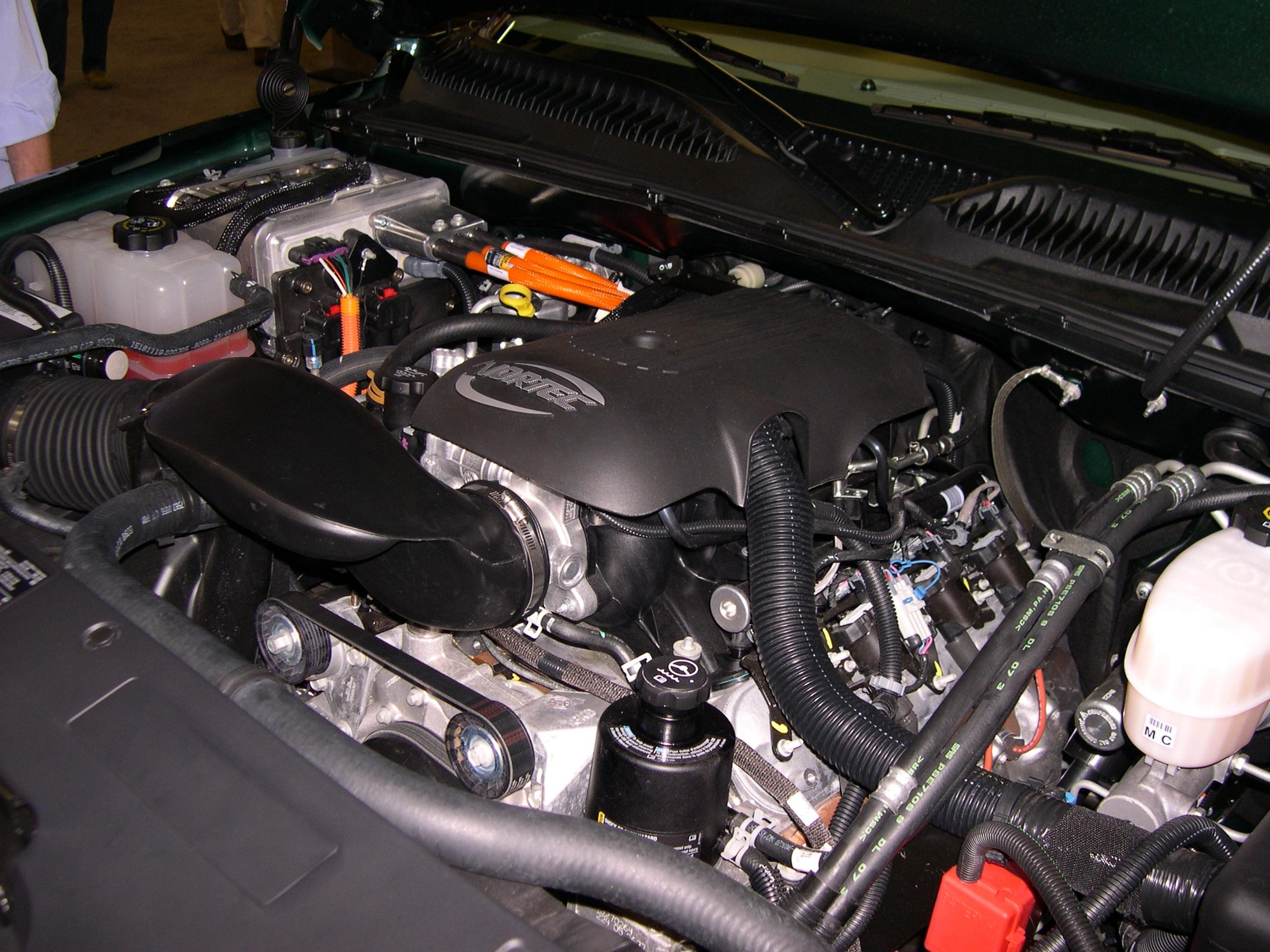
The engine compartment of a 2006 GMC Sierra Hybrid

GM launched a hybrid version of the Silverado/Sierra in 2004, becoming the first-ever GM hybrid passenger vehicle. Known within GM as the Parallel Hybrid Truck or PHT, it is not actually a parallel hybrid by the current definition, but a type of micro hybrid design. The electric motor housed within the transmission flywheel housing, serves only to provide engine cranking/starting, battery charging, and powering accessories. The engine automatically shuts down as the truck comes to a stop and uses 42-volt electric power to the starter/generator unit to restart the engine as the brake pedal is released. Besides the typical 12-volt automotive battery, the PHT uses three additional 14-volt valve-regulated lead–acid (VRLA) batteries mounted under the rear seat to store and provide power. The truck uses a 5.3 L LM7 Vortec 5300 V8 for primary propulsion power, and was only available in the extended-cab/short-bed configuration. These trucks were also purchased back from customers for more than what they were worth in the late 2000s.

The PHT features four 120-volt 20-ampere AC outlets, two in the bed and two inside the cab under the rear seat. These are particularly interesting to the building/construction contractor market, since they often require AC power when on the job. Additionally, the extra reserves of power for the accessories make this truck well-suited to that market, where trucks often sit at idle for hours at a time.

Availability was extremely limited at first, with commercial buyers getting the first allotment. Later in 2005, the truck was offered at retail in Alaska, California, Florida, Nevada, Oregon, Washington, and Canada. For 2006–07, the truck was generally available to retail buyers throughout North America. The Parallel Hybrid Truck was discontinued for the 2008 model year with the release of the GMT900 truck line. Starting in 2009, General Motors offered a second-generation Chevrolet Silverado and GMC Sierra equipped with a Two-Mode Hybrid powertrain and CVT.

== Heavy Duty ==
GMT800 Heavy Duty
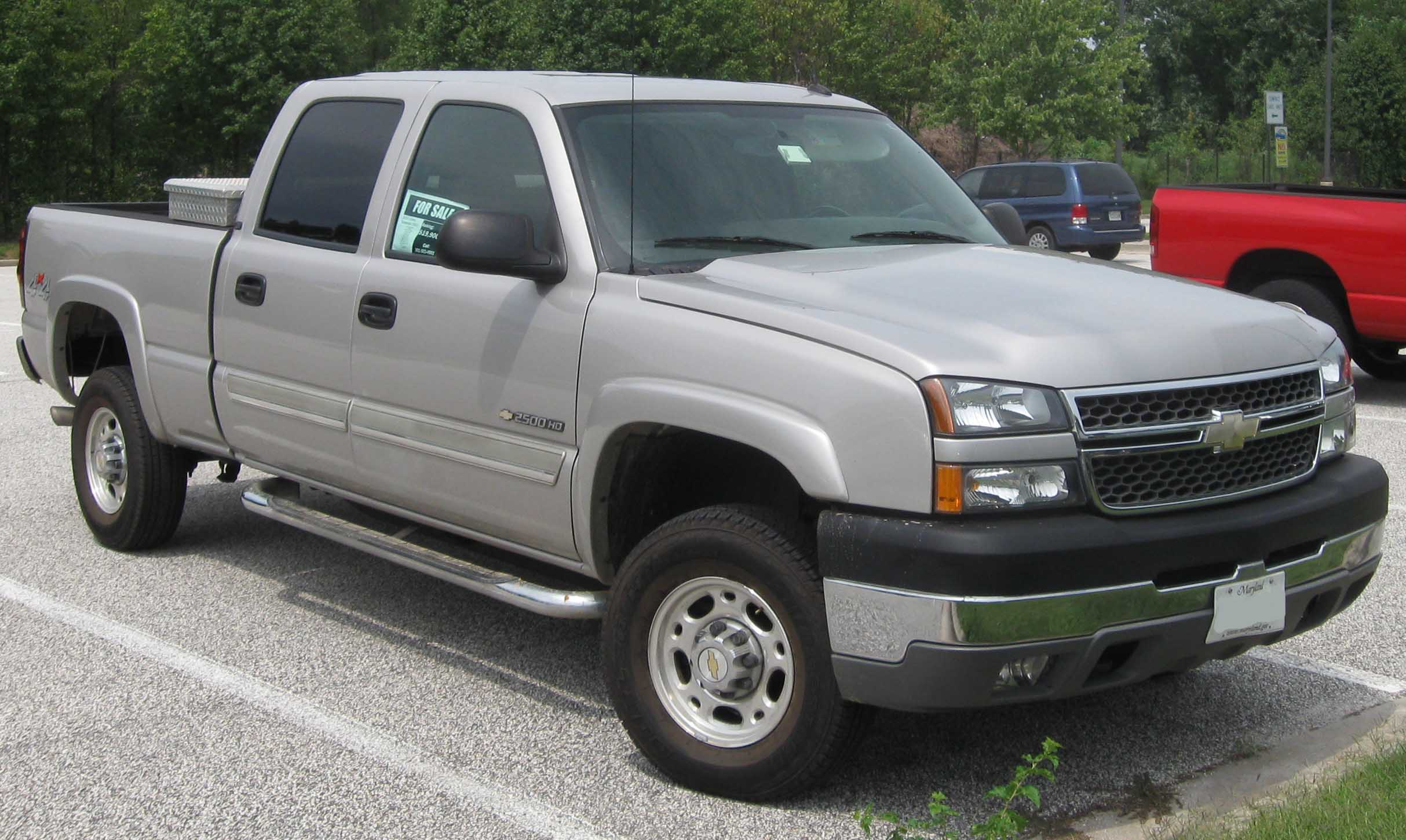

Overview
- Production: 2000–2007
- Assembly: United States: Roanoke, Indiana (Fort Wayne Assembly); Flint, Michigan (Flint Truck Assembly); Pontiac, Michigan (Pontiac East Assembly)

Body and chassis
- Platform: GM GMT880 platform

Powertrain
- Engine: 6.0 L Vortec 6000 V8; 8.1 L Vortec 8100 V8; 6.6 L Duramax turbodiesel V8
- Transmission: 4-speed 4L80-E automatic 5-speed Allison 1000 automatic (2000–2005); 6-speed Allison 1000 automatic (2005–2007); 5-speed NV4500 manual (2000–2007 6.0); 6-speed ZF S6-650 manual (2000–2006 6.6 and 8.1)

Dimensions
- Wheelbase: 133 in (3,378 mm); 143.5 in (3,645 mm); 157.5 in (4,000 mm); 167 in (4,242 mm); 153 in (3,886 mm)
- Length: Regular Cab, Long Box: 222.2 in (5,644 mm); Extended Cab, Short Box: 227.6 in (5,781 mm); Extended Cab, Long Box: 246.7 in (6,266 mm); Crew Cab, Short Box: 237.3 in (6,027 mm); Crew Cab, Long Box: 256.2 in (6,507 mm)
- Width: SRW: 79.7 in (2,024 mm); DRW: 96.1 in (2,441 mm)
- Height: 76.0–77.4 in (1,930–1,966 mm)

The HD variant is a heavy-duty version of the half-ton trucks. The HD was available in the 1500HD, 2500HD, and 3500 models. The 1500HD, introduced in 2000 for the 2001 model year, offered a Vortec 6000 V8 with 300 hp (224 kW) at 5200 rpm and 360 lb⋅ft (488 N⋅m) of torque at 4000 rpm with a Hydra-Matic 4L80-E four-speed automatic transmission. The 1500HD was only available in a crew-cab, standard-box configuration and shared several mechanical components with the corresponding 2500HD model, except that the 1500HD had a semi-floating axle and 8,600-pound GVWR. (It was not until the future 2014 K2XX body that a 1500 crew-cab standard-box configuration debuted.) Initially, the 1500HD was the only model of the 1500-series with a crew cab until a light-duty 1500 crew cab was introduced for 2004 (only available with a short bed). The 1500HD was rebadged as the 2500 model for 2004, and for 2005, the 2500 name was dropped permanently, with the 1500HD name returning. The 2500HD and 3500 also offered the Duramax diesel V8 with the LB7 model producing 300 hp (224 kW) at 3100 rpm and 520 lb⋅ft (705 N⋅m) of torque at 1800 rpm, the LLY model with 310 hp (231 kW) at 3000 rpm and 605 lb·ft (820 N·m) at 1600 rpm, and the LBZ model with 360 hp (268 kW) at 3200 rpm and 650 lb·ft (881 N·m) at 1600 rpm, as well as the Vortec 8100 V8 with 340 hp (254 kW) at 4200 rpm and 455 lb⋅ft (617 N⋅m) of torque at 3200 rpm.

The 2500HD had an available five-speed (six-speed for 2006–2007 models) Allison 1000 automatic transmission with the Vortec 8100 and 6.6 L Duramax. The 3500 offered the same engines and transmissions that the 2500HD used. However, it was usually equipped with dual rear wheels (a 4WD single-rear-wheel version with 9,900-pound GVWR was available from 2004) and had a stronger suspension. The HD models were primarily used for towing and high-weight cargo. According to a 2016 study by iSeeCars.com, the Chevrolet Silverado 2500HD came in at #2 among the top 10 longest-lasting vehicles and comprised 5.7% of vehicles over 200,000 miles.

For 2002, GMC introduced a new limited-edition Sierra Professional. Built as either a 1500 or 2500HD Extended Cab Short Box model with two- or four-wheel-drive, the Professional was billed as the ultimate contractor's truck. There were extra storage trays and larger cupholders throughout the cab, including one temperature-controlled cupholder. The exterior featured lower body cladding, "Professional" badging, and a full-chrome grille. These trucks also featured a standard bedliner, box-rail protectors, in-bed power outlet, and many optional accessories suited to tradesmen (such as ladder racks and toolboxes). The 1500 series came standard with the 5.3 L Vortec 5300 V8, but the 4.8 L Vortec 4800 V8 could be ordered with an option credit if so desired. 2500HD models came with the 6.0 L Vortec 6000 V8 only. All trucks had the four-speed automatic transmission with tow/haul mode. Customers could choose from either SLE or SLT trim. The base price for a 2002 1500 2WD with SLE trim was $29,591. 2003 was the final year the Professional was offered.

Towing capacity for the 1500HD is rated at 10,300 pounds (4,700 kg), and payload capacity was rated at 3,129 pounds (1,419 kg) in the bed depending on options. Towing capacity for the 2500HD is rated at 16,100 pounds (7,300 kg) with the gasoline 8.1 L V8 and 3.73:1 rear axle ratio, and payload capacity was rated at 3,964 pounds (1,798 kg) in the bed depending on options. Towing capacity for the 3500 is rated at 16,700 pounds (7,600 kg), and payload capacity was rated at 5,753 pounds (2,610 kg) in the bed depending on options. The addition of 4×4 tends to reduce the towing and carrying capacity by 200–400 lb (91–181 kg), depending upon year and model. Other factors, such as options, can also affect these numbers.

== 2003 refresh ==
For 2003, the Chevrolet Silverado and GMC Sierra models received a mid-cycle refresh (the former known as the "cateye" design to the general public). All Silverados and Sierras received a revised front-end design, and Silverados received new tail lamps (excluding DRW models which continued to use the pre-facelift taillights), most models also received new wheel designs. The interior was also redesigned, with a new dashboard design that included a new instrument cluster with an optional enhanced Driver Information Center (DIC), and a new four-spoke steering wheel (borrowed from the 2002 Trailblazer). New audio system options for 2003 included newly-available XM Satellite Radio capabilities, as well as a Bose premium audio system, and an integrated six-disc CD changer. All trucks also received new front seats with new upholstery designs and color schemes. Power adjustable brake and accelerator pedals were also newly available on select trims. New for 2003 was a Work Truck (WT or W/T) trim that was offered alongside the Base trim, and later became the new "base model" Silverado and Sierra. The Silverado 1500 lineup received a new "SS" trim that included the 6.0 L LQ9 Vortec V8 gasoline engine, while the LT model was divided into LT1, LT2, and LT3 trims. Other additions to the powertrain lineup for 2003 included a new E85-capable version of the 5.3 L Vortec V8 gasoline engine, which was available in states without California emissions standards.

== Engines ==
Model	Year	Engine	Power	Torque
1500	1999–2002	4.3 L Vortec 4300 V6	200 hp (149 kW) at 4600 rpm	260 lb⋅ft (353 N⋅m) at 2800 rpm
1500	2003–2007	4.3 L Vortec 4300 V6	195 hp (145 kW) at 4600 rpm	260 lb⋅ft (353 N⋅m) at 2800 rpm
1500	1999	4.8 L Vortec 4800 V8	255 hp (190 kW) at 5200 rpm	285 lb⋅ft (386 N⋅m) at 4000 rpm
1500	2000–2003	4.8 L Vortec 4800 V8	270 hp (201 kW) at 5200 rpm	285 lb⋅ft (386 N⋅m) at 4000 rpm
1500	2004–2007	4.8 L Vortec 4800 V8	285 hp (213 kW) at 5200 rpm	295 lb⋅ft (400 N⋅m) at 4000 rpm
1500	1999	5.3 L Vortec 5300 V8	270 hp (201 kW) at 5200 rpm	315 lb⋅ft (427 N⋅m) at 4000 rpm
1500	2000–2003	5.3 L Vortec 5300 V8	285 hp (213 kW) at 5200 rpm	325 lb⋅ft (441 N⋅m) at 4000 rpm
1500	2004–2007 w/ LM7	5.3 L Vortec 5300 V8	295 hp (220 kW) at 5200 rpm	335 lb⋅ft (454 N⋅m) at 4000 rpm
1500	2005–2007 w/ L33	5.3 L Vortec 5300 V8	310 hp (231 kW) at 5200 rpm	335 lb⋅ft (454 N⋅m) at 4000 rpm
1500HD/2500(HD)/3500	1999–2006	6.0 L Vortec 6000 V8	300 hp (224 kW) at 4400 rpm	360 lb⋅ft (488 N⋅m) at 4000 rpm
1500HD/2500(HD)/3500	2001–2003	8.1 L Vortec 8100 V8	340 hp (254 kW) at 4200 rpm	455 lb⋅ft (617 N⋅m) at 3200 rpm
1500HD/2500(HD)/3500	2004–2006	8.1 L Vortec 8100 V8	330 hp (246 kW) at 4200 rpm	450 lb⋅ft (610 N⋅m) at 3200 rpm
1500HD/2500(HD)/3500	2001–2004	6.6 L Duramax (LB7) V8	300 hp (224 kW) at 3100 rpm	520 lb⋅ft (705 N⋅m) at 1800 rpm
1500HD/2500(HD)/3500	2004.5–2006 w/ manual trans	6.6 L Duramax (LLY) V8	300 hp (224 kW) at 3000 rpm	520 lb⋅ft (705 N⋅m) at 1800 rpm
1500HD/2500(HD)/3500	2004.5–2006 w/ auto trans	6.6 L Duramax (LLY) V8	310 hp (231 kW) at 3000 rpm	605 lb⋅ft (820 N⋅m) at 1600 rpm
1500HD/2500(HD)/3500	2006–2007	6.6 L Duramax (LBZ) V8	360 hp (268 kW) at 3200 rpm	650 lb⋅ft (881 N⋅m) at 1600 rpm
GMC Sierra C3	2001	6.0 L Vortec 6000 V8	325 hp (242 kW) at 5000 rpm	370 lb⋅ft (502 N⋅m) at 4000 rpm
GMC Sierra Denali	2002–2004	6.0 L Vortec 6000 V8	325 hp (242 kW) at 5000 rpm	370 lb⋅ft (502 N⋅m) at 4000 rpm
GMC Sierra Denali	2005–2007	6.0 L Vortec 6000 V8	345 hp (257 kW) at 5200 rpm	380 lb⋅ft (515 N⋅m) at 4000 rpm
Chevrolet Silverado SS	2003–2007	6.0 L Vortec 6000 V8	345 hp (257 kW) at 5200 rpm	380 lb⋅ft (515 N⋅m) at 4000 rpm
Chevrolet Silverado Vortec High Output	2003–2005	6.0 L Vortec 6000 V8	345 hp (257 kW) at 5200 rpm	380 lb⋅ft (515 N⋅m) at 4000 rpm
Chevrolet Silverado VortecMAX	2006–2007	6.0 L Vortec 6000 V8	345 hp (257 kW) at 5200 rpm	380 lb⋅ft (515 N⋅m) at 4000 rpm

== Gallery ==
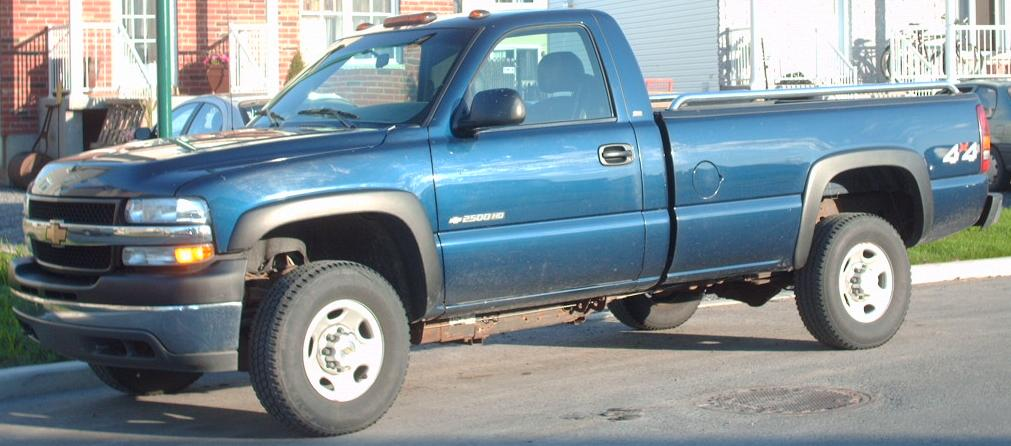
2001–2002 Chevrolet Silverado 2500HD Regular Cab

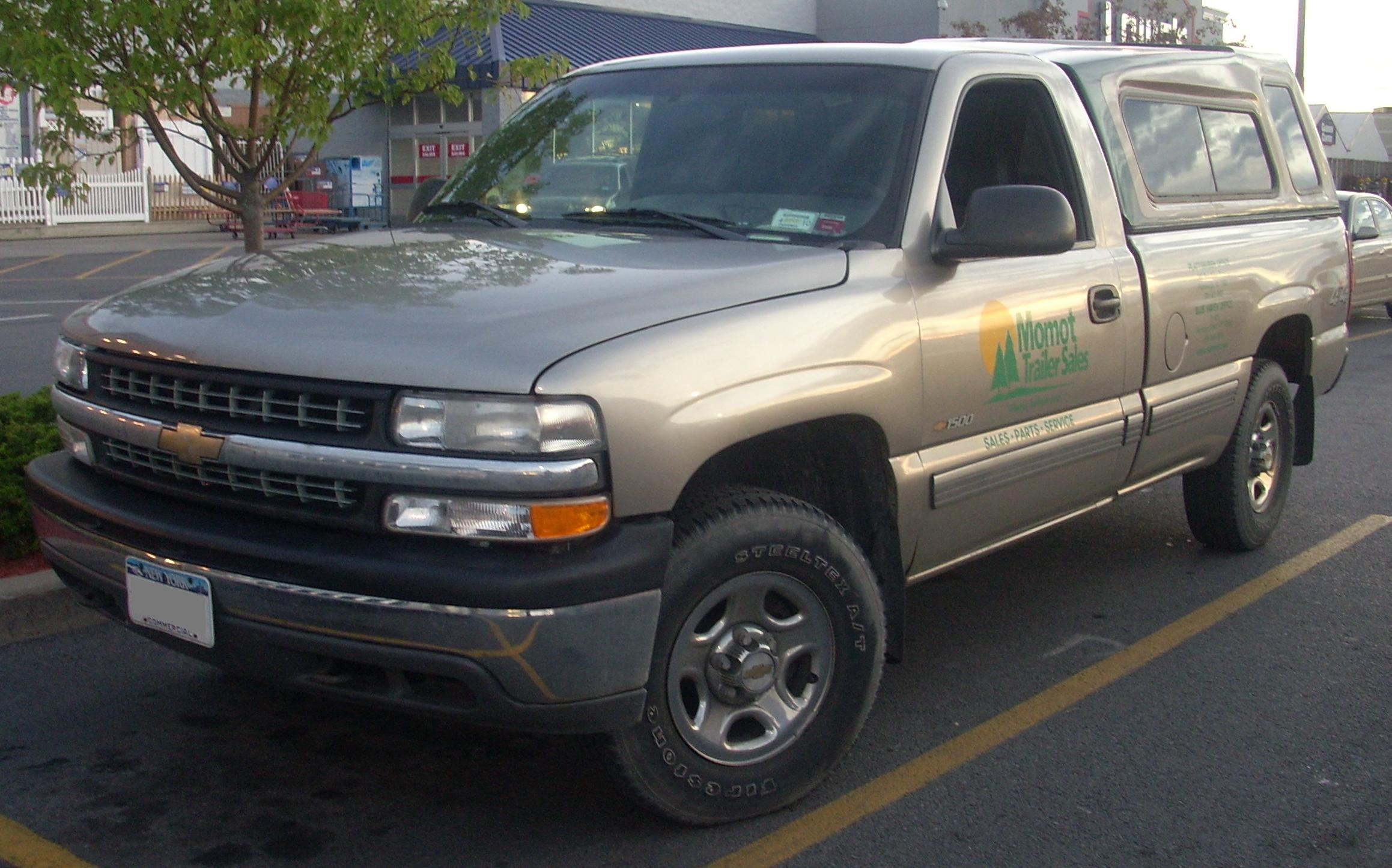
1999–2002 Chevrolet Silverado 1500 Regular Cab with bed cap

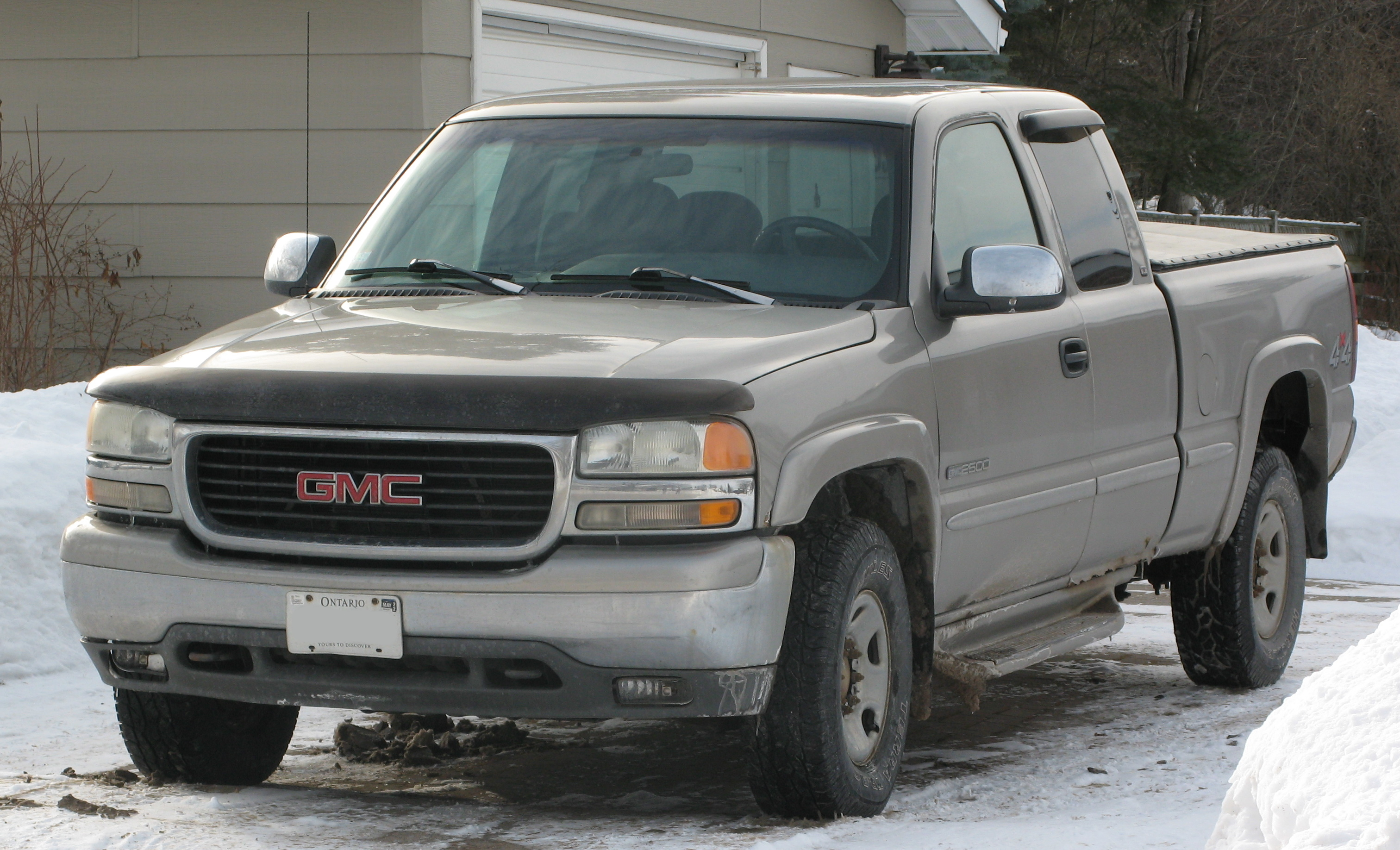
1999 GMC Sierra 2500

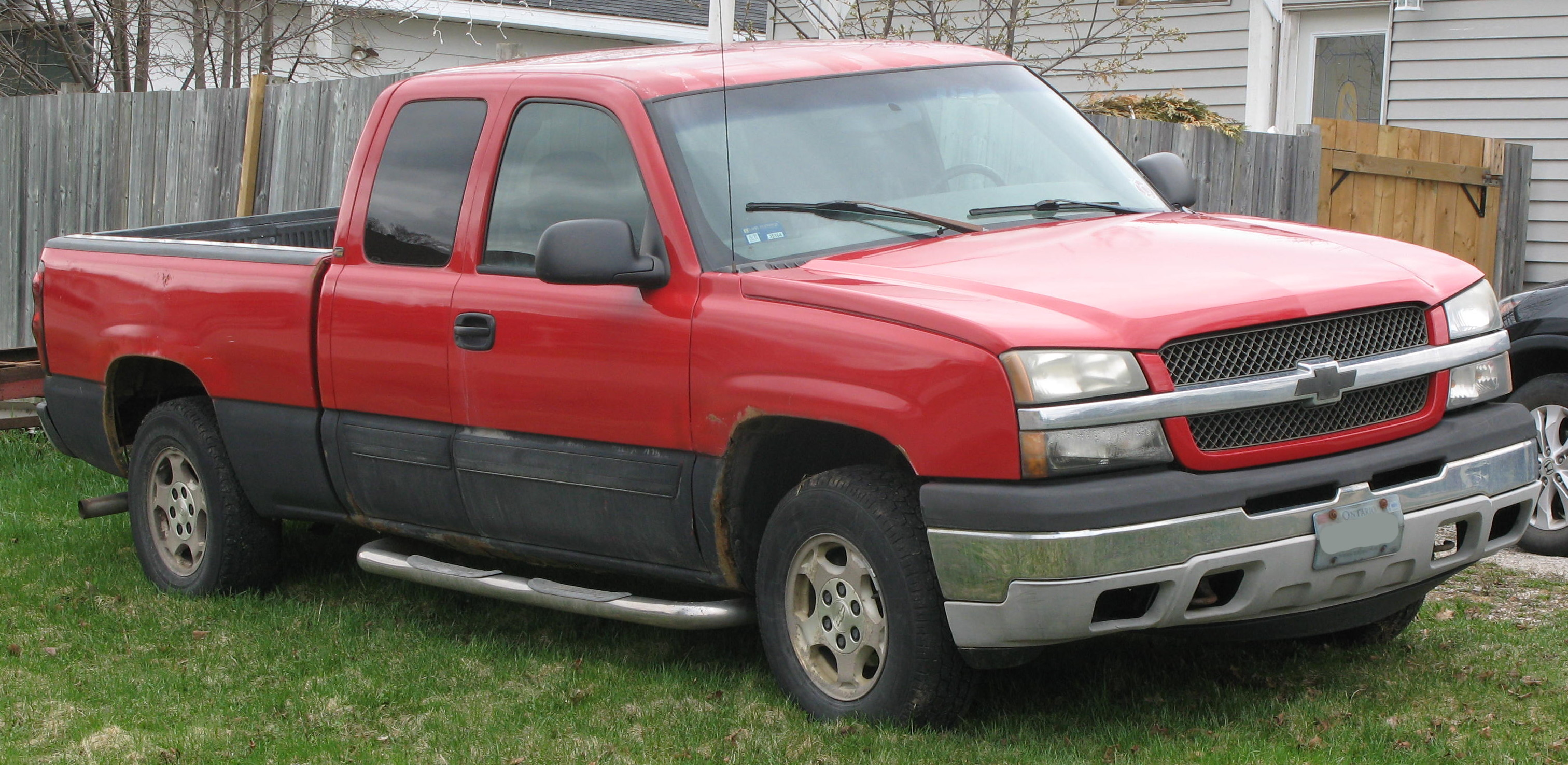
2004 Chevrolet Silverado 1500

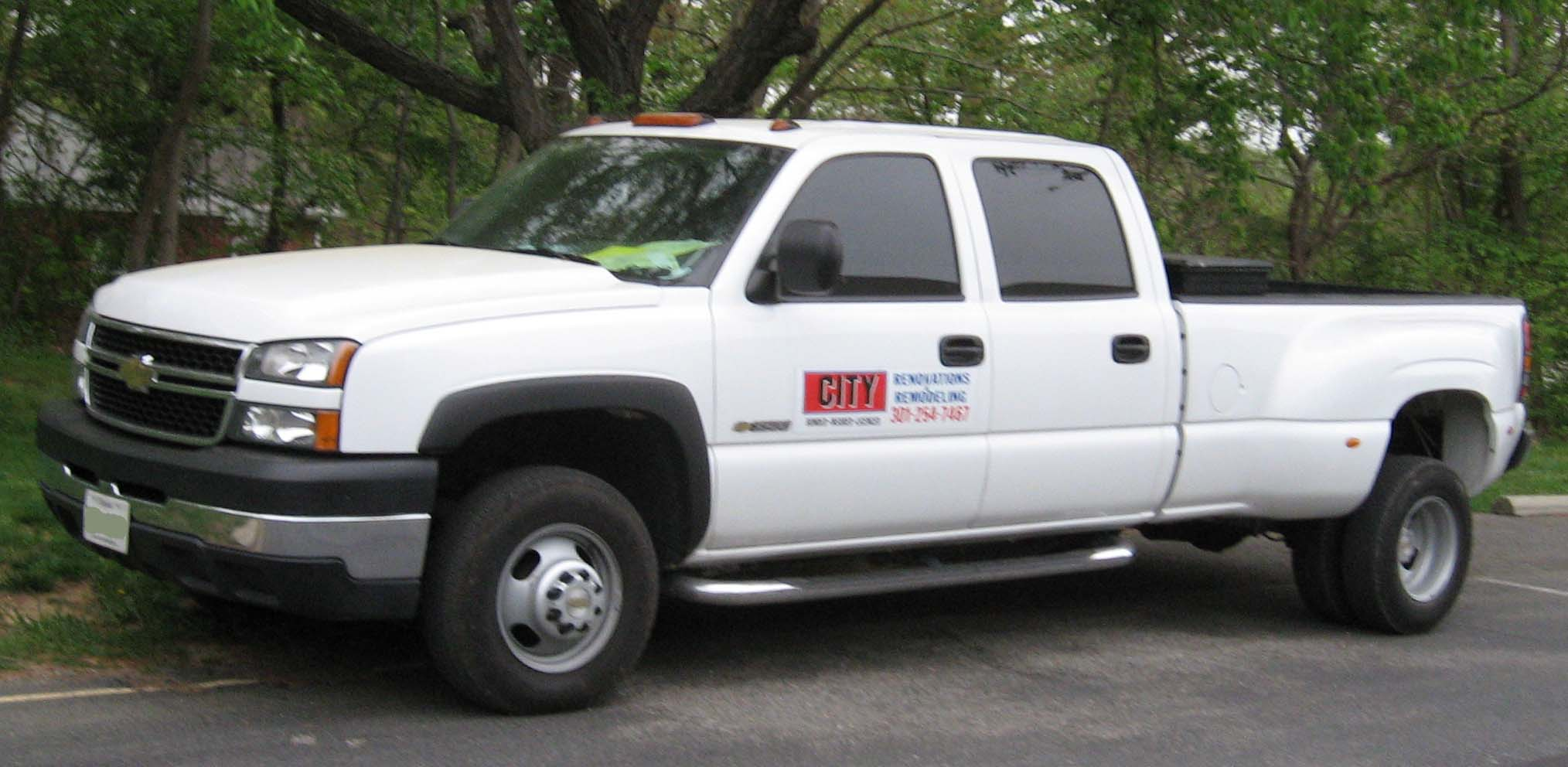
2005–2007 (Classic) Chevrolet Silverado 3500 Crew Cab

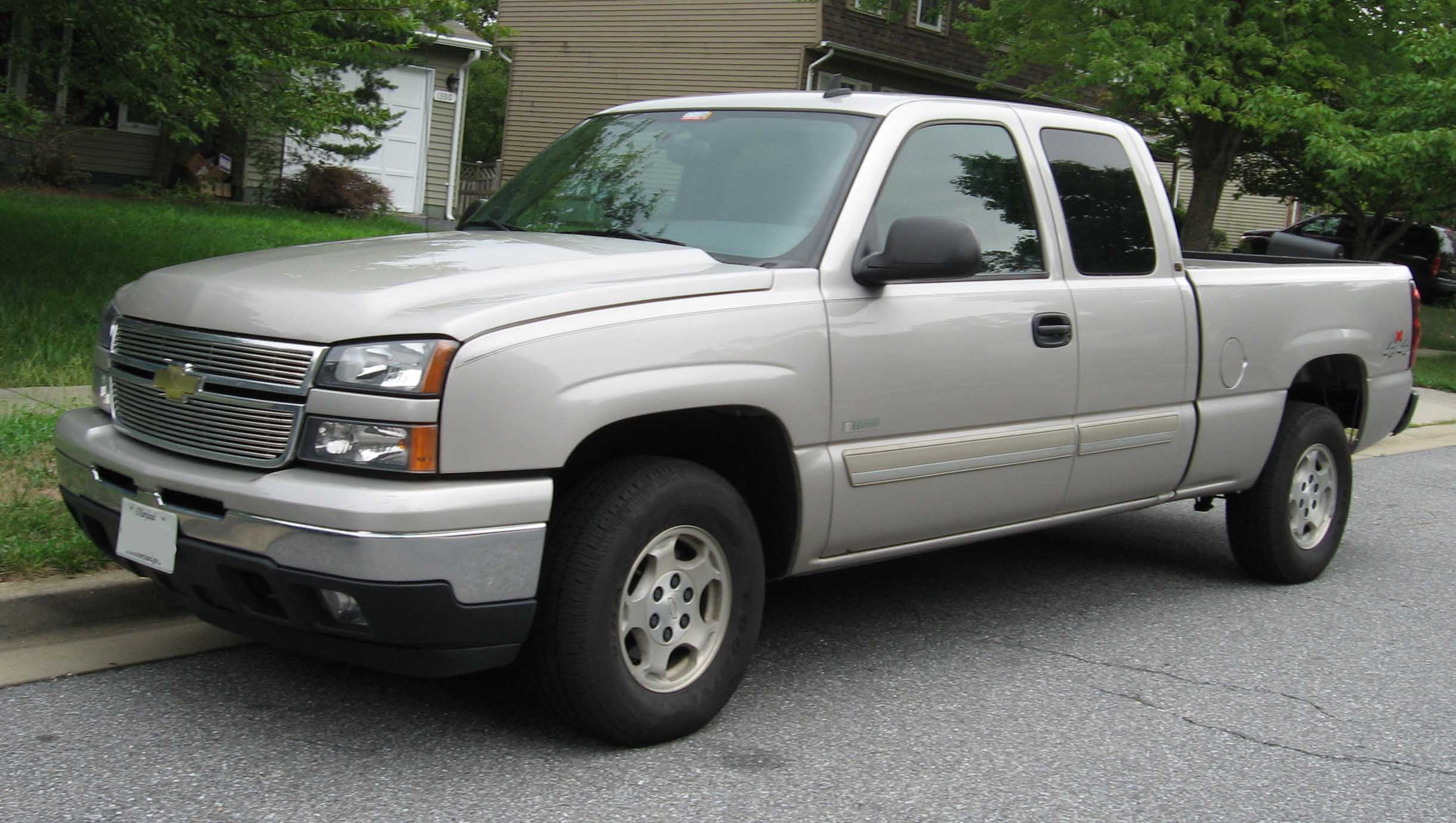
2006 Chevrolet Silverado 1500 Hybrid

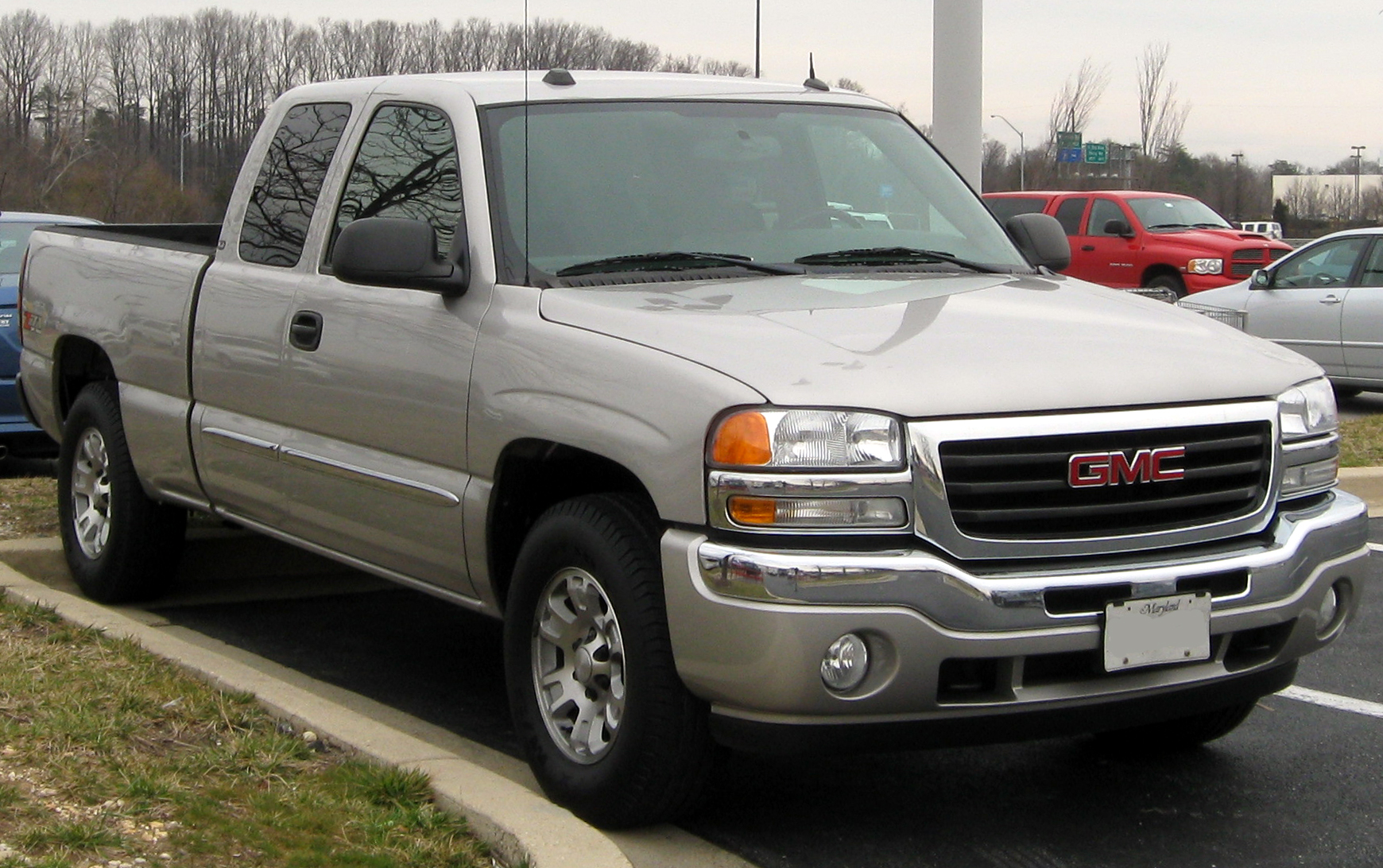
2003–2006 GMC Sierra 1500

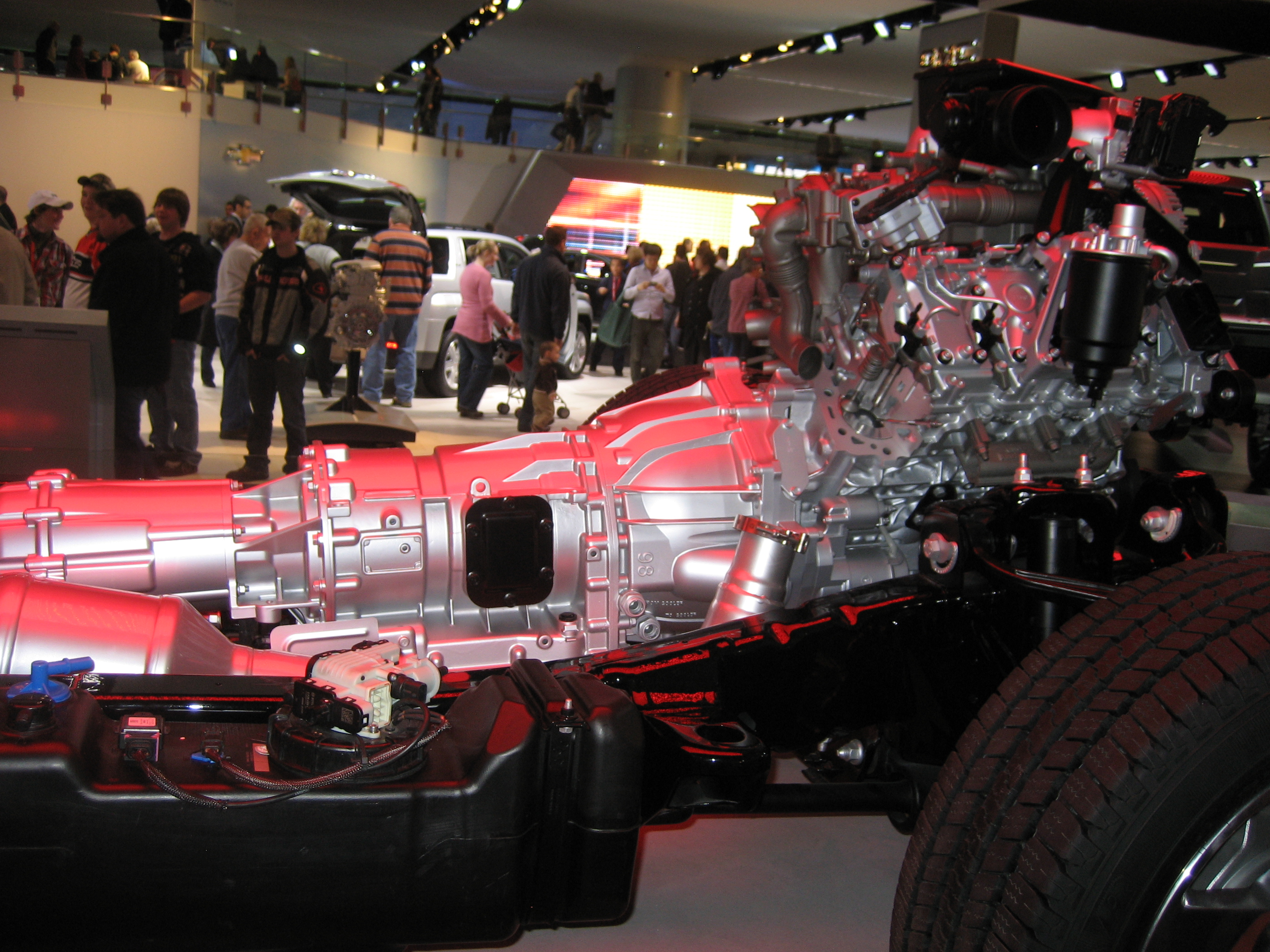
The Allison 1000 attached to the 6.6L Duramax Diesel
