= GVA =

GVA may refer to:

== Companies and organizations ==
- Generalitat Valenciana, the self-governing institutes of Valencia, Spain
- Gloucestershire Volunteer Artillery, of the Royal Artillery, UK
- Granite Construction, an American construction company
- Gun Violence Archive, an American organization cataloguing mass shootings
- GVA Consultants, a Swedish company
- GVA (Gazet van Antwerpen), a Belgian newspaper

== Science ==
- General visceral afferent fibers, in the nervous system
- Grapevine virus A, a virus species
- Gigavolt-ampere, a billion volt-amperes

== Other uses ==
- Generic Vehicle Architecture, a military vehicle standard of the British Ministry of Defence
- Geneva Airport, in Switzerland
- Garibaldi Volcanic Arc, in British Columbia, Canada
- Greater Vancouver Area, British Columbia, Canada
- Greg Van Avermaet, a Belgian professional road bicycle racer
- Gross value added, an economic measure
