= Zibar =

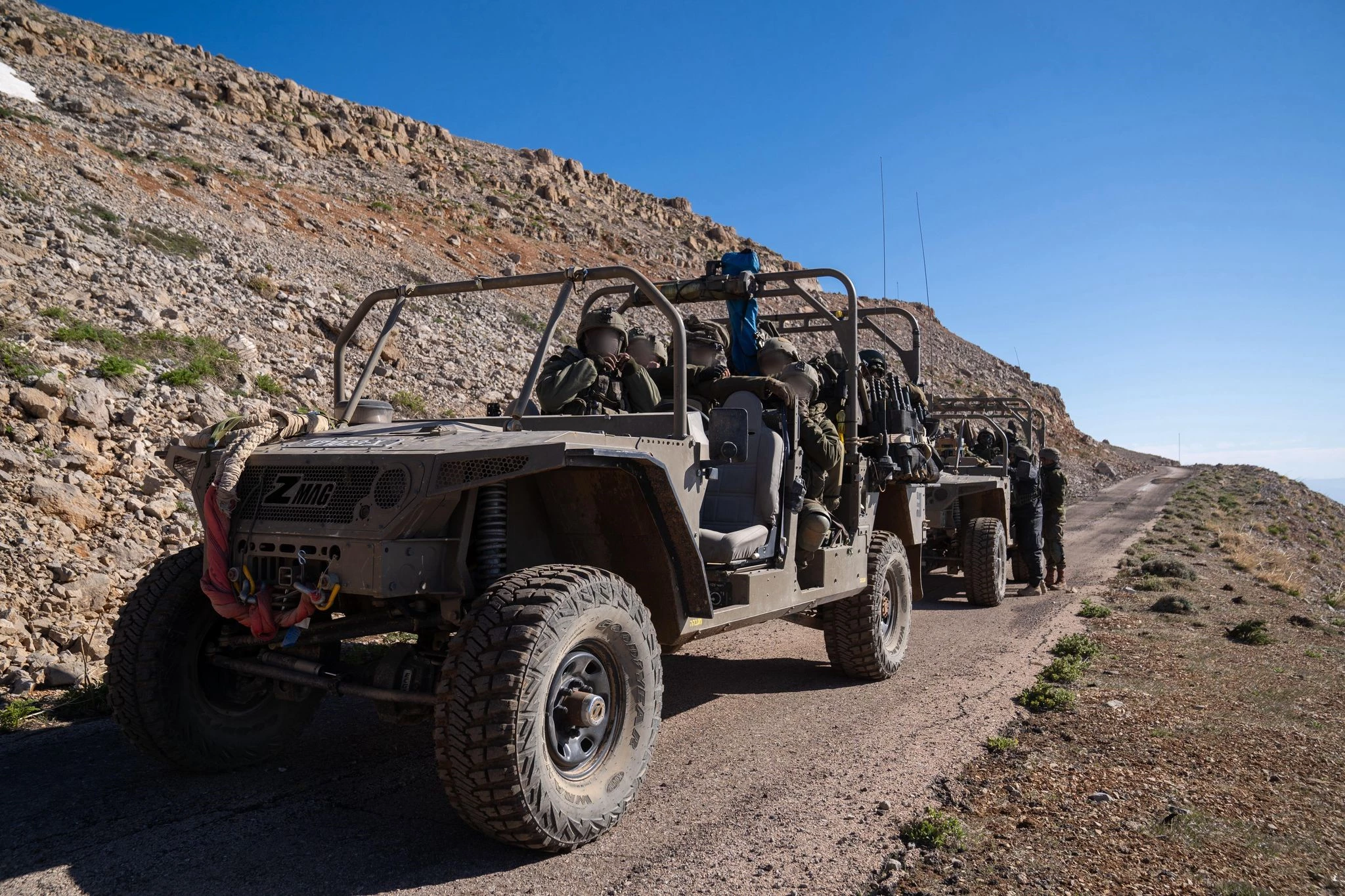

Overview
- Manufacturer: IAI Land Systems Division, Ido OffRoad Center Ltd. (IORC)
- Production: 1989–present
- Assembly: Pardes Hanna-Karkur, Haifa District, Israel Beer Sheva, Negev, Israel

Body and chassis
- Class: Off-road vehicle
- Layout: F4
- Related: Humvee

ZIBAR is a family of high-mobility, 4x4, all-terrain vehicles designed and manufactured in Israel. Originally developed in 1998 by Ido Cohen of Ido Off Road Center Ltd. (IORC), the ZIBAR family is now produced by Israel Aerospace Industries (IAI) at the Land Systems Division of IAI's subsidiary ELTA Systems. Designed to handle challenging terrain and harsh environments, the ZIBAR is utilized by military and security forces for a variety of roles, including troop transport, reconnaissance, and logistics support.

== Development ==
Cohen designed and manufactured the vehicle's chassis and frame while utilizing commercial off-the-shelf parts such as General Motors crate LS3 383 cid/6.2L 400 hp V8 engines (current engine is the LQ4 GM 6L 430 hp (320 kW) @ 5900 rpm V8,) General Motors 4L80E transmission, Atlas II transfer cases and General Motors Dynatrac 60 axles with ARB air lockers which give the vehicle enhanced stability in off-road conditions.

The vehicle features a monocoque design that provides improved safety, stability, and load handling while travelling at high speeds. It is manufactured in accordance with the Generic Vehicle Architecture (GVA), a design standard followed by the UK Ministry of Defence for military vehicles. The vehicle’s architecture ensures that all the parts of the driveline are safely housed in the hull to provide higher ground clearance. This approach also eliminates the need for incorporating additional shields to guard the driveline parts, reducing the overall curb weight of the vehicle. The ‘One platform multiple layout’ characteristic of the vehicle family allows the variants to be configured in multiple layouts to meet the mission requirements of the customers. The vehicle’s sturdiness enables increased survivability and reliability.

The ZMAG is a Tactical Utility Vehicle configurable with a closed or open cabin. It can transport soldiers (up to 14 seating capacity) and large payloads at considerable speed and stability over sand dunes, rocky trails, swamps and streams, making it an extremely reliable platform for maneuvering forces. ZMAG can carry a payload of 2,500 kg, it has foldable safety roll bars and adjustable cargo and seating arrangements. It is air transportable by C-130 and CH-53 aircraft. It provides an option to be fitted with an armour package as per the mission requirements. ZMAG can be fitted with either a V8 gasoline engine that produces 500 Nm torque or a diesel engine.

== Specifications ==
Z-Family Specifications	Zibar	Zmag	ZD
Length (mm):	5000	5000	4000
Height (mm):	1950	1400	1400
Width (mm):	2200	2000	1900
ground clearance (cm)	330	330	280
Curb Weight (kg):	2,850	2,850	1,600
Powerplant:	V8 L96	V8 L96	2.4 L Ecotec
Power (hp):	380	380	182
Max road speed (km/h):	120	120	110
Operational range (km):	500	500	500
Approach angle	90	90	90
Departure angle	48	48	64
Longitudinal slope	100	100	100
Side slope angle	65	65	65
Vertical step (m)	0.4	0.4	0.3
Trench crossing (m)	0.5	0.5	0.4
Water Fording (m)	0.8	0.8	0.6

== Variants ==
- Z-COM – a stripped down four seat side-by-side UTV
- Zibar Mk.1 – the initial variant, now out of production,
- Zibar Mk. 2 – the current civil version
- Zibar M – the military variant
- Z- Mag – lightened open prototype
- Zibar Trooper – Hardtop two or four door pickup truck
- Zibar Zed – armored variant

== Operational history ==
In 2013, about 30 Zibar vehicles were delivered to the Mexican energy company Petróleos Mexicanos (PEMEX) to serve as patrol vehicles, and a year later were transferred to the Mexican Army. In 2020 IAI acquired the manufacturing operations of the Zibar and ZMAG offroad tactical vehicles and ZED – the armored off-road vehicle, from IORC. IAI ELTA began producing the vehicles at its manufacturing site in Beer Sheva, where a, where RAM vehicles are currently built. In 2022 IAI has won a $30 million order from the Israel MOD for the delivery of 30 ZMag vehicles for special operations units and combat mobility applications. IAI adapted and configured the vehicles for military and homeland defense applications, and position as the vehicle's design authority. The US based Armored Group (TAG), an international vehicle manufacturer based in the USA, is also part of the program, TAG, providing some of the components.

== Users ==
By 2025 there were over 70 made-in-Israel Zibars, five of them to the Israeli military and the others to customers in Africa, Russia, Latin America and Abu Dhabi.

== See also ==
- Humvee
- M1301 ISV
- VECTOR
