= Force Protection, Inc. =

American military vehicle manufacturer

- Type: Division
- Industry: automotive industry military vehicle industry
- Founded: 1996; 30 years ago, in San Diego, California
- Founder: Frank Kavanaugh
- Defunct: 19 December 2011
- Headquarters: Ladson, South Carolina
- Key people: Frank Kavanaugh (chairman)
- Products: mine- and blast- protected vehicles
- Number of employees: over 1000
- Subsidiaries: Force Protection Europe
- Website: www.gdls.com

Force Protection, Inc. was a manufacturer of ballistic- and blast-protected vehicles from the United States which have been used in Iraq, Afghanistan, Kosovo and other hot spots around the world. The company was acquired by General Dynamics in 2011.

== Company ==
The company traces its roots to Sonic Jet Performance, Inc., a California speed boat company founded in 1997. When the boat business hit tough times after the September 11 attacks, a new investor, Frank Kavanaugh, stepped in and looked to alter the direction of the business. Kavanaugh financed and secured the rights to a new line of products in support of the company's Mission to Protect and Save Lives. Around that time, the team identified an insolvent company in South Carolina called Technical Solutions, building a prototype of a mine-resistant vehicle the 'Buffalo' and attempting to build a smaller vehicle the Cougar/Tempest MRAP (Mine Resistant Ambush Protected). Technical Solutions was struggling and required a new strategy and additional resources. The products were designed using commercial components, and utilized a strategy to allow them to be rapidly rebuilt in the field.

Kavanaugh, the company chairman and largest investor, rebranded the company as Force Protection and expanded its engineering and manufacturing capabilities, including hiring Dr. Vernon Joynt, a blast protection expert. Over a three-year period, the company modified its vehicle designs and increased production capacity, using commercially available U.S. automotive components and a blast-resistant chassis design. Annual sales alter approach $1.3 billion.

The heavily armored trucks featured a V-hull design that deflected underbody blasts away from the passenger compartment, and with Joynt's expertise the products were enhanced to address side-blast from IEDs (Improvised Explosive Devices) that had become a primary cause of injury and death for soldiers in Iraq and Afghanistan. The base designs secured from Mechem (South African government) resulted in two U.S. models: the Buffalo, a huge, mine-clearing truck, and the Cougar, which was smaller and more versatile, and through the company's research and development efforts with Joynt several innovations and improvements such as the Cheetah, and spaced armor.

Force Protection initially struggled with its first small MRAP contracts in 2002 through 2005. At first the company had less than a dozen people on its early production line. At times the prototype approach took five weeks to build one Cougar. The United States Department of Defense fined Force Protection more than $1.5 million for initial delivery delays. Kavanaugh focused on moving from a prototype production environment to sustainable volume production methods.

The team overcame these issues, developed agreements with other defense industry manufacturers such as Armor Holdings and BAE Systems, as well as a joint venture company with General Dynamics ("Force Dynamics"), to merge Force Protection's proprietary designs with the manufacturing capacity necessary to meet increasing demand. Force Protection received several contracts as part of the MRAP program, supplying blast resistant vehicles to American forces in Iraq, but with Kavanaugh's departure in 2007 the remaining team lost focus and chose not to introduce an innovative JLTV category vehicle known as Cheetah. This led ultimately to the sale of the company to General Dynamics as orders were increasingly placed with rival companies.

== Product Line ==
- Cheetah – Thirteen Cheetah prototypes were produced in 2005 and available in 2006 & 2007. Intended for urban operations, reconnaissance, and forward command and control, no contracts were signed for the Cheetah.
- Cougar – The Cougar is a medium-sized mine-protected vehicle for command and control, artillery prime mover, recovery and ambulance duty. The Cougar has been in service with a number of armed forces since 2002.
  - Cougar H 4×4 can carry 4 troops and an EOD robot.
  - Cougar HE 6×6 can carry up to 12 troops.
- Buffalo – The Buffalo is designed principally for route clearing activities, asset protection, urban weapons systems, and command and control. The Buffalo has been in service with a number of armed forces since 2003
- SPECTRE – The SPECTRE light vehicle (formerly JAMMA) prototype. Offered to SOCOM in 2012, no contracts were signed.
- Ocelot – The Ocelot, which is designed and built in the United Kingdom by Force Protection Europe, is a light protected patrol vehicle (LPPV) ordered in 2010 to replace the UK military's Snatch Land Rover .

== See also ==
- ILAV
