= FPE =

FPE may refer to:

- Factor price equalization, an economic theory
- Fire protection engineer, an application of science and engineering principles
- Flash pulmonary edema
- Floating-point exception
- Format-preserving encryption
- Force Protection Europe, a vehicle manufacturer
- Fokker–Planck equation
- Free-piston engine
- Fuchs Petrolub, a German lubricant manufacturer
- Fuel Price Escalator, a British fuel duty
- Pichinglis, an English creole spoken in Equatorial Guinea
