= Buffalo (mine protected vehicle) =

Military minesweeper

- Buffalo being used to dig up an IED during training
- Type: Mine-Resistant Ambush Protected Vehicle
- Place of origin: United States

Service history
- Used by: See Operators
- Wars: Iraq War, Afghanistan War

Production history
- Manufacturer: Force Protection, Inc.
- Produced: 2003

Specifications
- Mass: 45,320 lb (20,560 kg) (curb weight); 56,000 lb (25,000 kg) (max weight)
- Length: 27 ft (8.2 m)
- Width: 8.5 ft (2.6 m)
- Height: 13 ft (4.0 m)
- Crew: 2+4
- Armor: All wheels and centerline mine protected
- Engine: Mack ASET AI-400 I6; 330 KW (450 HP)
- Payload capacity: 38,680 lb (17,540 kg)
- Transmission: Allison HD-4560P automatic
- Suspension: 6×6 wheeled
- Ground clearance: 15 in (410 mm)
- Fuel capacity: 85 US gal (320 L)
- Operational range: 300 mi (483 km)
- Maximum speed: 65 mph (105 km/h)

The Buffalo is a Mine-Resistant Ambush Protected Vehicle built by Force Protection, Inc., a division of General Dynamics. It is the largest vehicle in Force Protection's line-up, followed by the Cougar HE MRAP and the Ocelot light protected patrol vehicle (LPPV).

== History ==
The Buffalo vehicle was designed based on the successful Casspir vehicle, protected against land mines, of South African make. The Casspir is a four-wheeled vehicle, while the Buffalo has six wheels. Buffalo is also fitted with a large articulated arm, used for ordnance disposal. Both vehicles incorporate a V-shaped monohull chassis that directs the force of the blast away from the occupants.

Buffalo is also now equipped with BAE Systems' LROD cage armor for additional protection against RPG-7 anti-tank rounds. Glass armor is sufficient at 6 inches thickness. Run-flat tires are mounted on all six wheels. The Buffalo combines ballistic and blast protection with infrared technology to detect the presence of dangerous ordnance and a robotic arm to disable the explosive ordnance. Personnel operate the Buffalo’s 30-foot robotic arm and claw from within the armored hull via a mounted camera and sensory equipment, to safely dispose of mines and IEDs.

In 2004, the United States had a limited number of Buffaloes in service, with an order for 15 more, at a cost of $10 million. On June 6, 2008 Force Protection, Inc delivered its 200th Buffalo to the U.S. Military.

In 2009 Force Protection started producing the A2 version, with major changes in the Axle Tech rear axles, Cat C13 engine, Cat CX31 transmission, and suspension, along with additional upgrades to the HVAC system, hood and front bumper. The easiest way to identify an A1 version from the A2 version is that the front bumper of the A2 has a larger profile. The last Buffalo A2 MRAP truck 795 was completed in June 2014. Force Protection was acquired by General Dynamics Land Systems (GDLS) in 2011 for $350 million.

== Variants ==
- Buffalo H
- Buffalo A2

== Operators ==
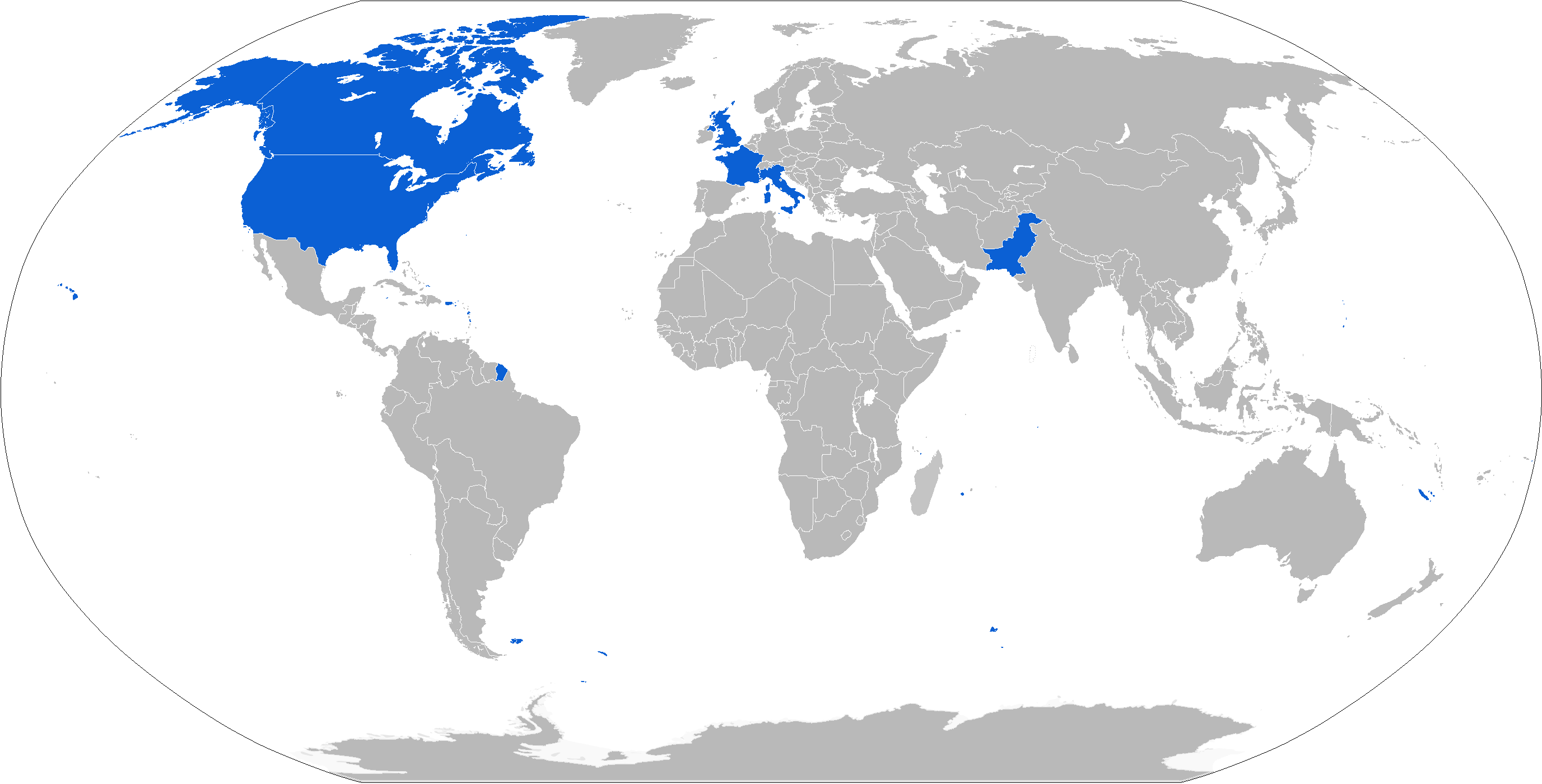
Map with Buffalo operators in blue

=== Current ===
- United States – 200 A1 version and approximately 450 A2 version
- Canada – 5
- France – 5 vehicles
- Italy
- Pakistan – 20 Cougar JERRV (Buffalo Explosive Ordnance Disposal version) received from US under Coalition Support Fund in 2010.

=== Future ===
- Ukraine − On August 16, 2024 the Ukrainian Ministry of Defense approved the delivery of Buffalo MPVs to the Armed Forces of Ukraine

=== Former ===
- United Kingdom – 18 vehicles used in Afghanistan, no longer in service.

== See also ==
- MRAP (armored vehicle)
- Buffel
- Casspir
- Kamaz Typhoon
- Ural Typhoon
- Wer’wolf MKII
- RG-33

== Gallery ==
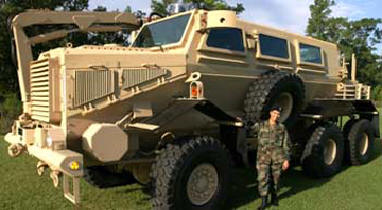
Buffalo mine-protected vehicle and GI

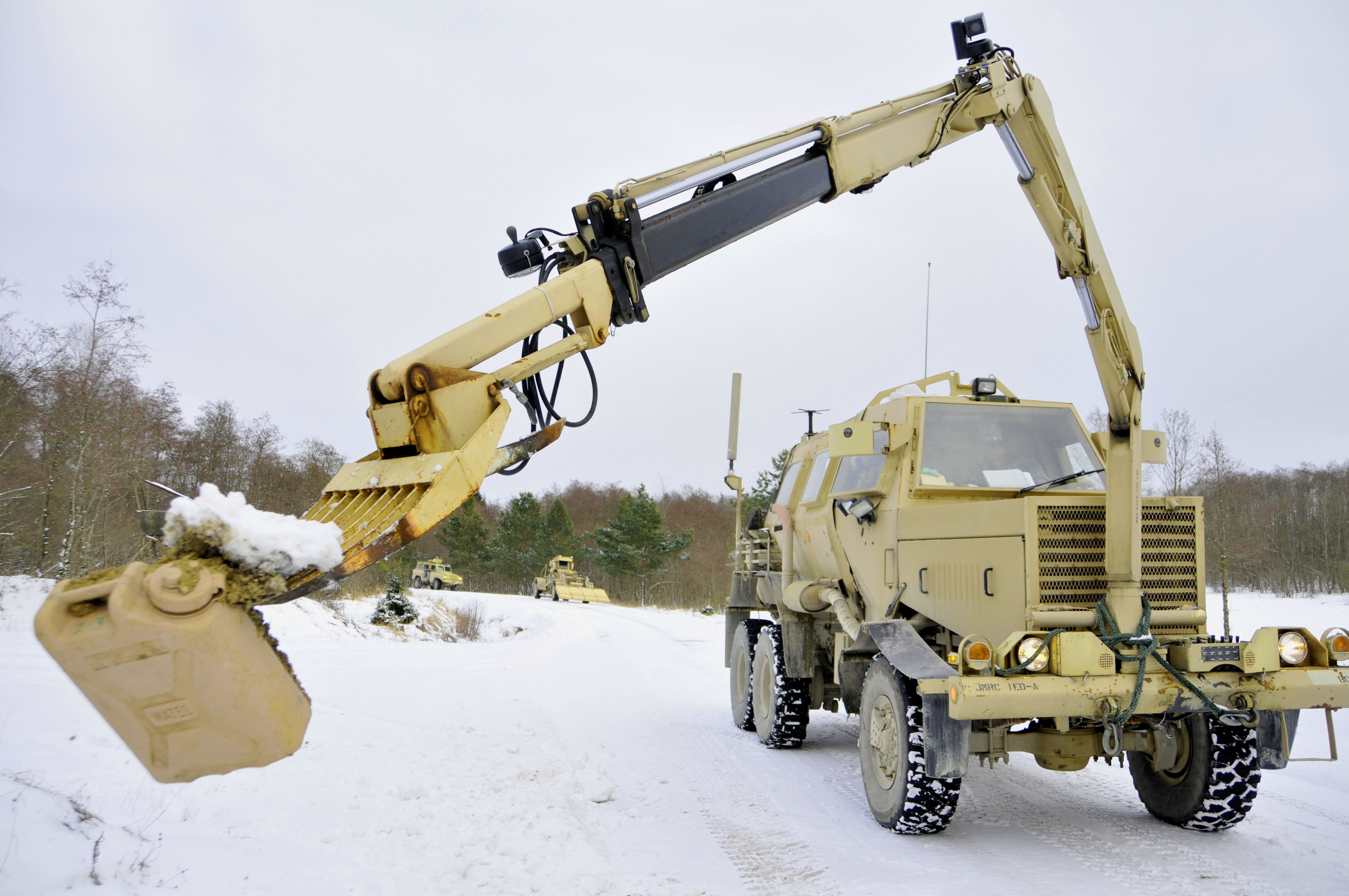
Buffalo showing remote manipulator arm

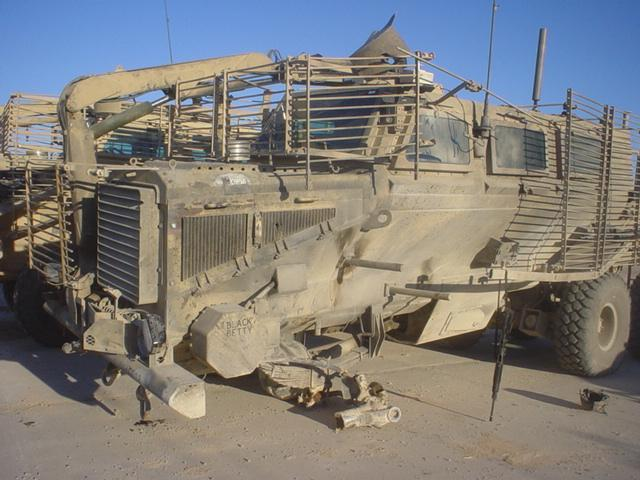
A Buffalo that survived with its cabin intact after an IED attack took its two front wheels and axle off

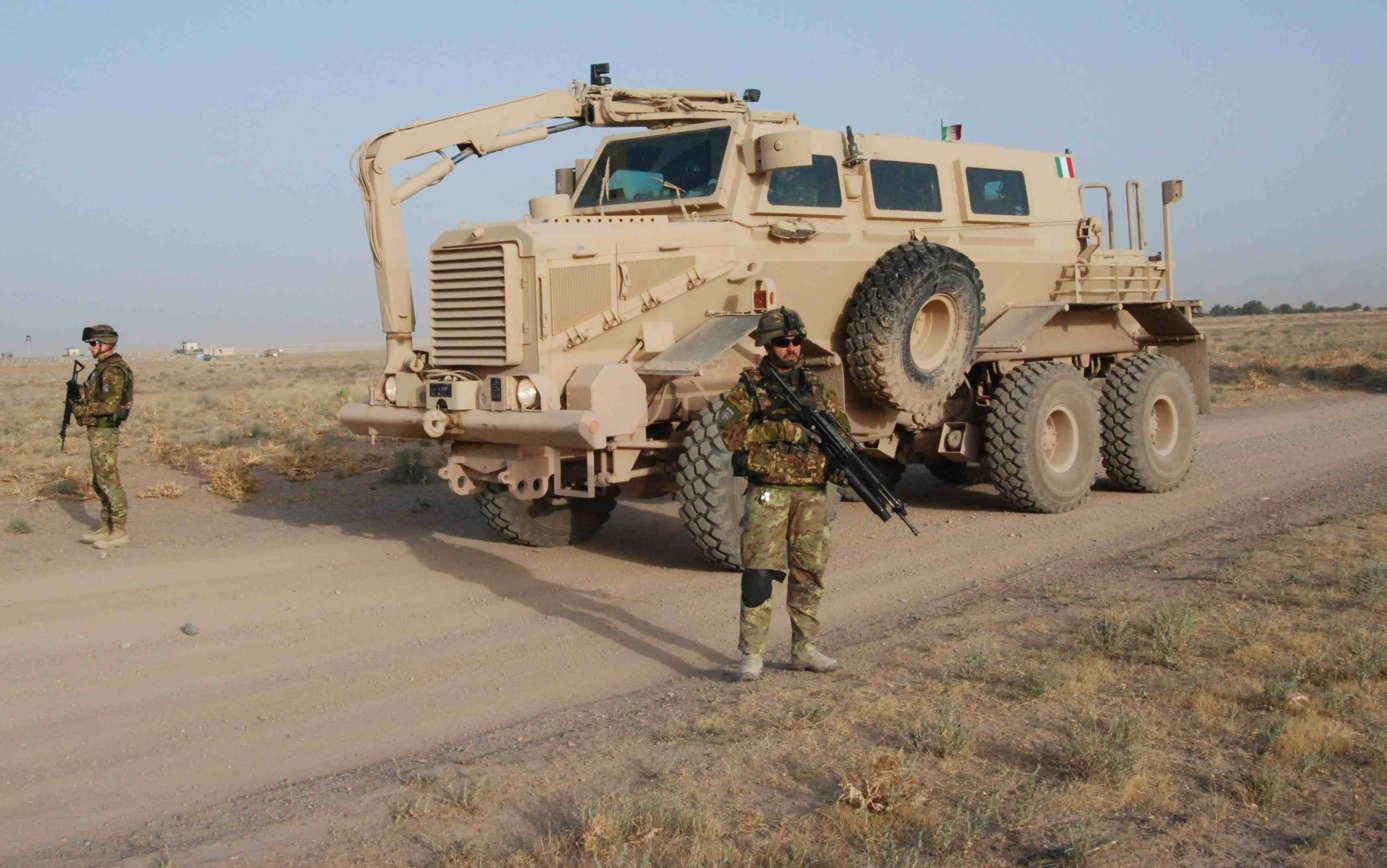
Buffalo in Italian service

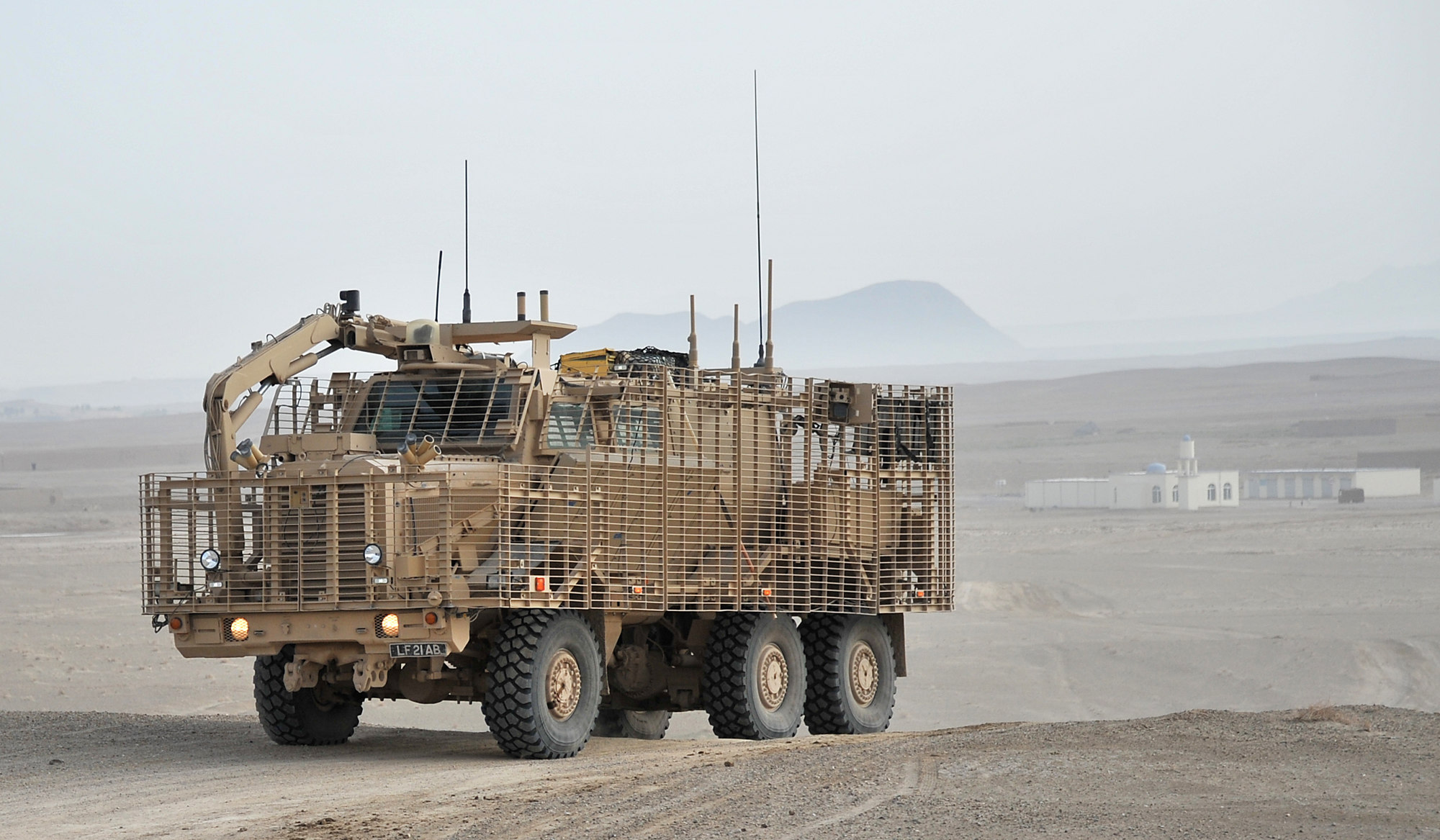
Buffalo in British service with additional slat armour
