= Force Protection Europe =

European subsidiary of Force Protection Inc.

Force Protection Europe Limited
- Company type: Subsidiary
- Founded: 26 August 2008; 17 years ago
- Headquarters: Leamington Spa, Warwickshire, United Kingdom
- Products: Ocelot/Foxhound
- Parent: Force Protection, Inc.

Force Protection Europe Limited (FPE) was the European subsidiary of Force Protection Inc, which was acquired by General Dynamics in 2011. The UK-based company developed the Foxhound, a light-weight mine-protected military vehicle, which was developed to replace the Snatch Land Rover. FPE won a £180 million contract from the British Ministry of Defence in 2010 to supply 200 Foxhound vehicles. Following the acquisition by General Dynamics in December 2011, the Foxhound is marketed as part of General Dynamics Land Systems vehicle portfolio.
