= Allison 1000 transmission =

System used in trucks manufactured in the US

The 1000 series (and similar 2000 and 2400 series) is a line of automatic transmissions for on-road trucks. All are 5 or 6-speed electronically controlled units and are manufactured by Allison Transmission in Indianapolis, Indiana as well as in Baltimore, Maryland and in Erskine, Minnesota.

The 1000/2000 Series is the smallest transmission that Allison manufactures. Other transmission families include the 3000, 4000, 5000, 6000, 8000, and 9000 Series, with correspondingly larger and more capable transmissions as the number increases.

== Planetary Gears ==
There are 3 consecutive planetary systems and the planet carrier of a stage is permanently connected to the ring gear of the following stage, except for the last system where the carrier is connected to the output shaft. The first three gears behave similar, for them all three sun gears are clutched to the input shaft and either one of the three ring gears is braked. For first gear, ring 3 is stationary and torque transfer is from sun gear to the carrier of the last system. For gear two, ring 2 is braked and thus ring 3 (driven by carrier 2) will add some torque in the same direction as sun 3. For the third gear, ring 1 is braked and ring 2 will rotate in the direction of the input, and therefore ring 3 will rotate faster than it does in gear 2.

Besides the clutches that can hold each ring gear stationary, there is one clutch that can engage sun 2 and sun 3, which reside on a common shaft, to the input. sun 1 is always connected to the input. A final clutch can tie carrier 2 together with ring 3 to the input. For the fourth gear like for gears 1 - 3, the sun gears are all connected to the input and in addition, ring 3. Thus the last system is in direct drive and all gears in the transmission rotate together for a ratio of 1:1.

There are two overdrive configurations. For those, ring 3 is connected to the input and additional speed is added by rotation of sun 3. Sun 2 and 3 must be disengaged from the input in the overdrive regimes and they are free to spin. When ring 1 is braked, sun 1 (still connected to the input) will cause ring 2 to spin in the forward direction and sun 2 and sun 3 will spin in the forward direction. The second overdrive is with ring 2 braked which will cause sun 2 to spin faster than in the first overdrive gear.

There is one reverse gear. Ring 1 and ring 3 are braked with the input only connected to sun 1. Sun 1 will drive ring 2 in the forward direction and with carrier 2 braked, sun 2 and sun 3 will spin in reverse. With Ring 3 braked, the output will be spun in the reverse direction by sun 3.

== Allison 1000 ==
Initially the Allison 1000 was a 5 speed transmission, rated to handle up to 620 lb⋅ft (840 N⋅m) of torque. This rating has increased as the transmission was updated several times, to stand at 765 lb⋅ft (1,037 N⋅m) by 2011 in GM truck applications.

A new "Generation 4" 1000 was introduced in 2005 that added a 6th gear at the very top of the ratio ladder, making it a double-overdrive. For the 2006 model year, manual gear selection was introduced. This feature gives the driver greater control over the transmission, enhancing operation when engine braking or less frequent shifting is desired.

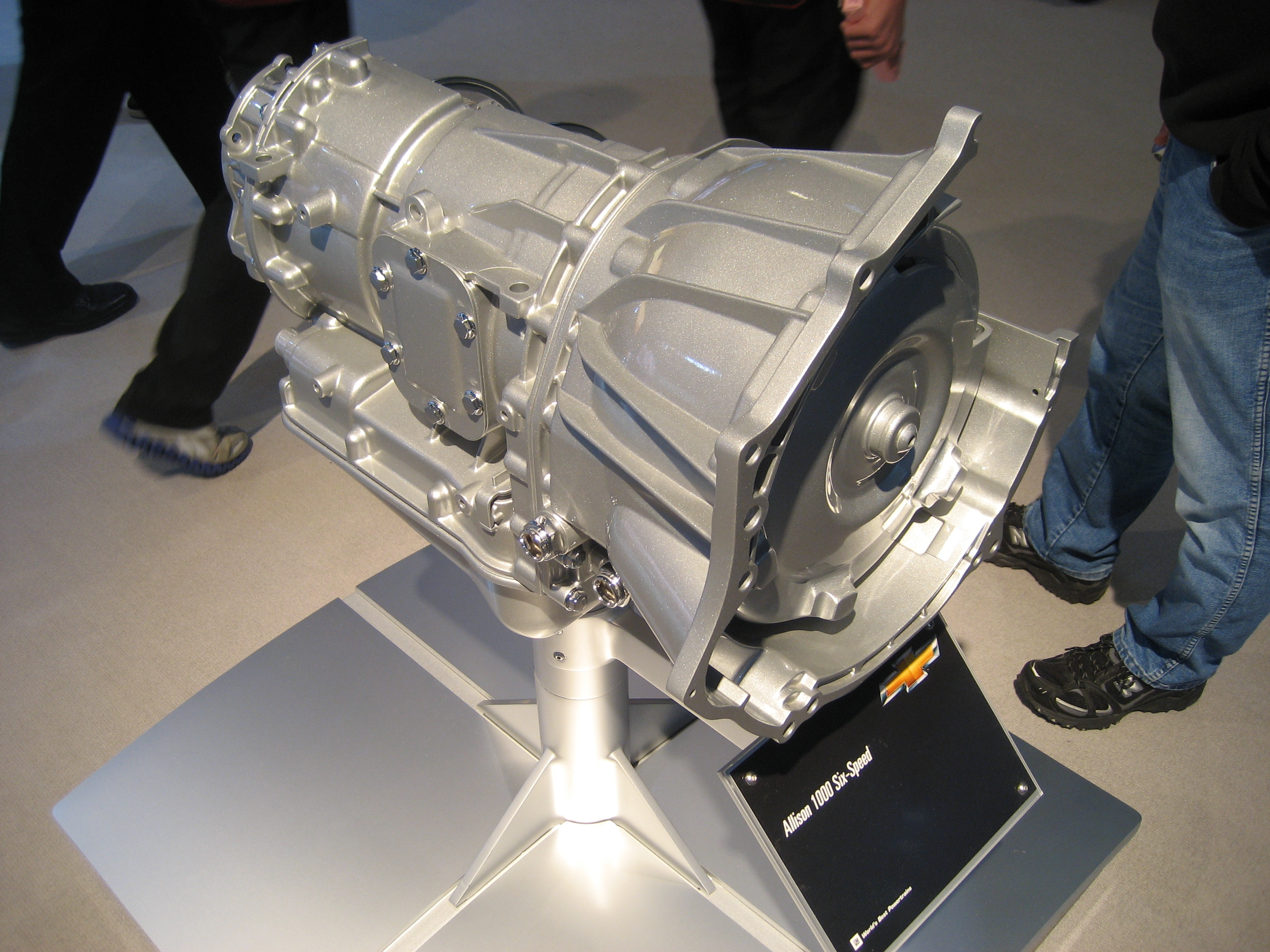
Allison 1000

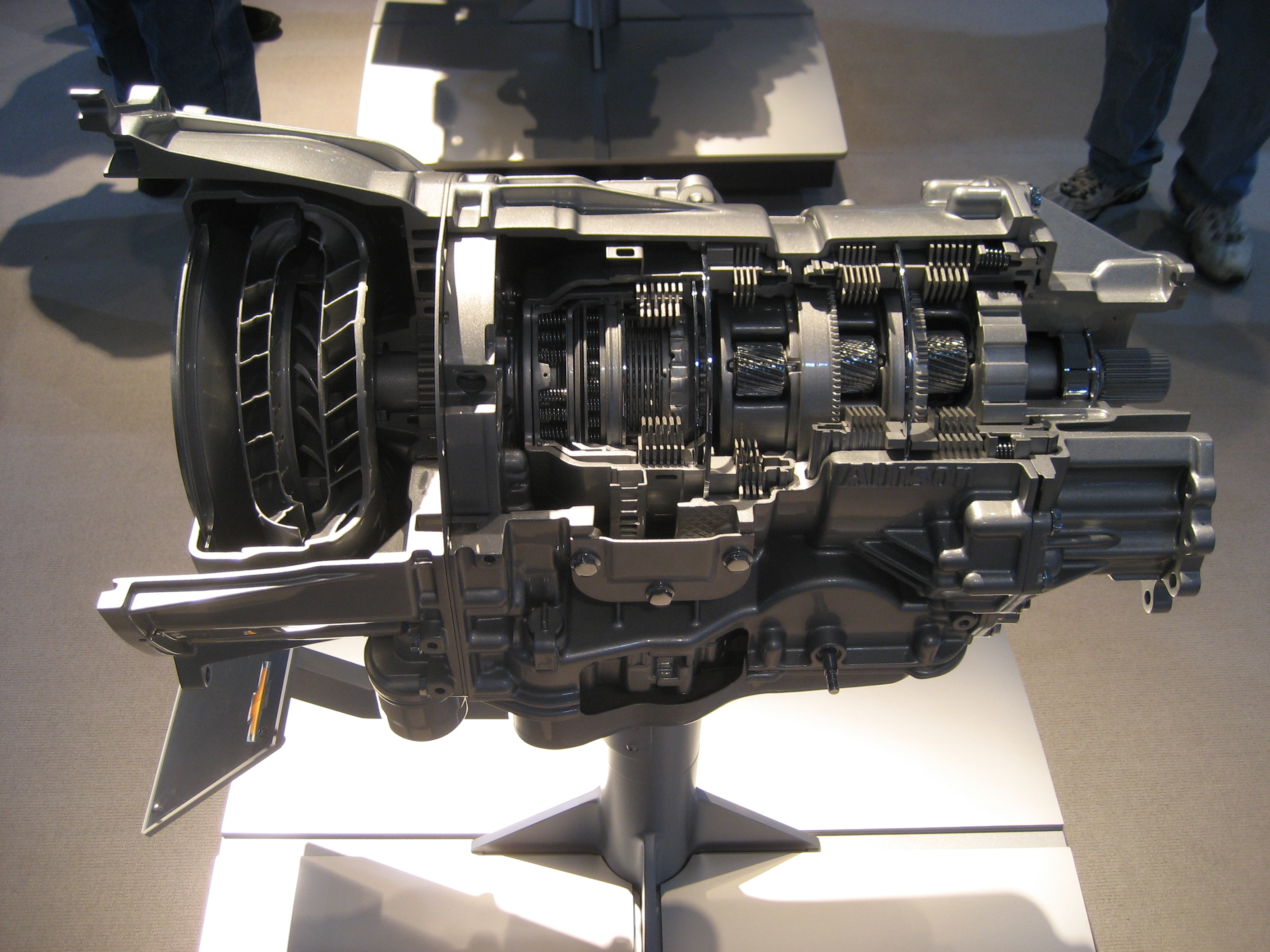
Allison 1000 cutaway

Gear ratios:

1	2	3	4	5	6	R
3.10	1.81	1.41	1.00	0.71	0.61 (06+)	4.49

Applications:

- Chevrolet Silverado
- Chevrolet Kodiak/GMC Topkick
- GMC Sierra
- Hummer H1
- Chevrolet B-Series

== Allison 2000 ==
The Allison 2000 is rated to handle up to 620 lb⋅ft (840 N⋅m) of torque.

Gear ratios:

1	2	3	4	5	R
3.51	1.90	1.44	1.00	0.74	5.09

Applications:

- B-7 bus
- C-Series truck
- Cheetah MMPV
- F-Series truck (Ford F-650)
- International XT Series

== Allison 3070/4070 ==
Applications:

- Western Star Trucks
- Kenworth Trucks
- Peterbilt Trucks
- Freightliner Trucks
- International Trucks

== Allison 3700SP ==
Applications:

- Family of Medium Tactical Vehicles (FMTV)
- BAE Caiman MRAP
