= Ocelot (vehicle) =

British armoured vehicle

General Dynamics Ocelot
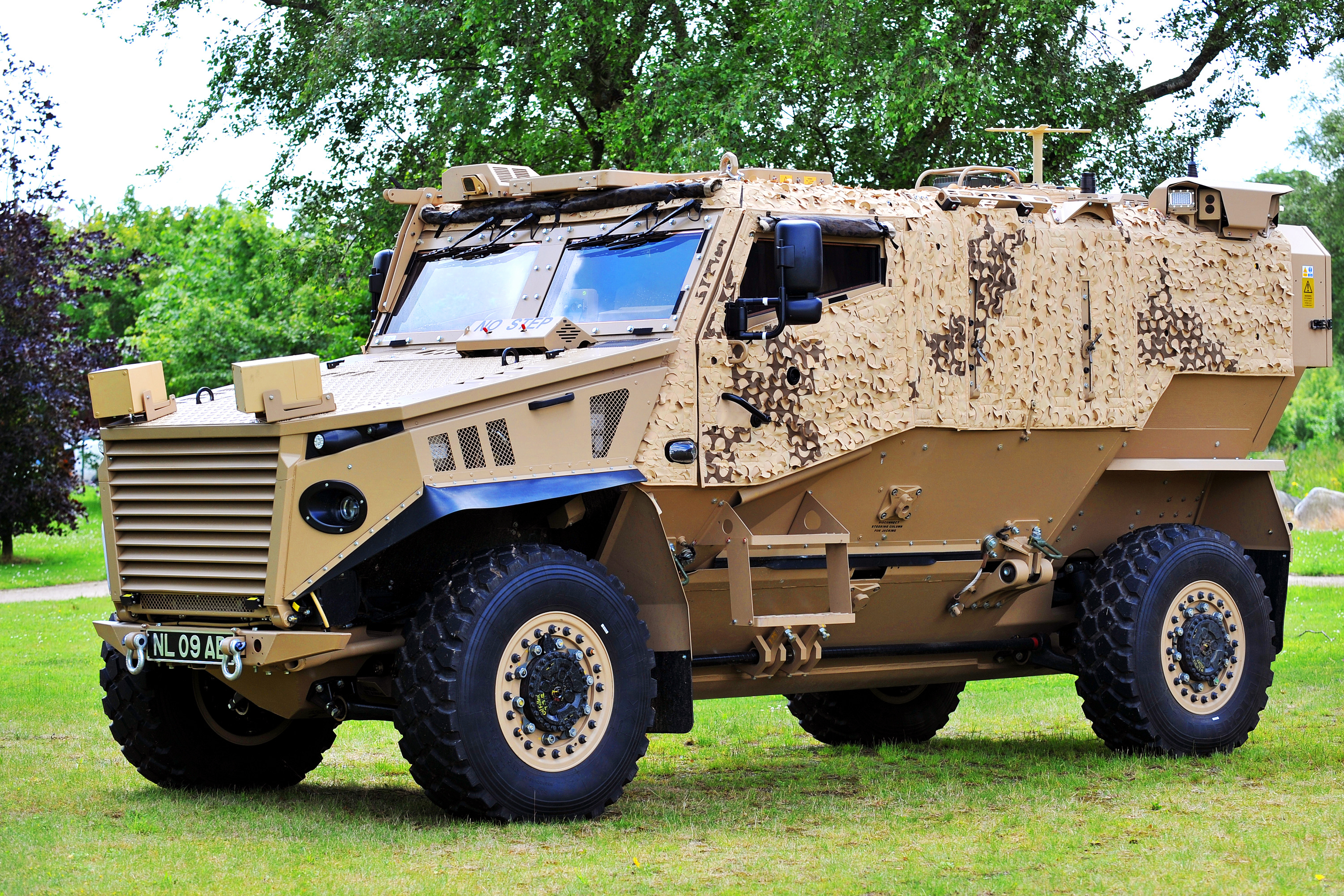
- Foxhound on display
- Type: Infantry mobility vehicle with MRAP capabilities
- Place of origin: United Kingdom

Production history
- Designer: Ricardo plc / Force Protection Europe
- Designed: 2009–2010
- Manufacturer: Force Protection Europe (2009–2011); General Dynamics UK (2011–present)
- Unit cost: £923k (~US$1.5m)
- Produced: 2011– (projected)
- Variants: Prototypes in differing configurations including LRPV and steel armour

Specifications
- Mass: 8500 kg
- Length: 5.32 m (17 ft 5 in)
- Width: 2.1 m (6 ft 11 in)
- Height: 2.35 m (7 ft 9 in)
- Main armament: 2x 7.62mm GPMG
- Engine: Steyr M16-Monoblock 6-cylinder Diesel; 160 kW (210 hp)
- Payload capacity: 3000 kg
- Transmission: ZF 6HP28X 6-speed automatic transmission
- Suspension: Independent front and rear suspensions, fitted with stabilizers, torsion bars, and telescopic shock absorbers
- Operational range: 500 km
- Maximum speed: 82 mph (132 km/h)

The General Dynamics Ocelot, originally known as the Force Protection Ocelot, is a British infantry mobility vehicle that replaced the United Kingdom's Snatch Land Rover with British forces. It received the service name Foxhound, in line with the canine names given to other wheeled armoured vehicles in current British use such as Mastiff, Wolfhound, and Ridgeback, which are all variants of the Cougar.

The goal in replacing the Snatch Land Rover was to improve protection of personnel against improvised explosive devices (IEDs).

== Design ==
Designed by Force Protection Europe and the automotive engineering company Ricardo, the Ocelot is intended for use as a light protected patrol vehicle (LPPV) with specialised protection against roadside bombs and improvised explosive devices (IEDs). It can weigh up to 7,500 kilograms (16,500 lb) when loaded. This is smaller than most Mine-Resistant Ambush-Protected (MRAP) vehicles, but larger than the Humvee replacement vehicles being developed through the Joint Light Tactical Vehicle (JLTV) program.

Powered by a Steyr M16-Monoblock diesel engine (6-cylinder, 160 kW), connected to a ZF 6HP28X 6-speed automatic transmission, it reaches a speed of 50 mph (80 km/h) in 19.75 seconds, and has a maximum speed of 82 mph (132 km/h). Its wheels function independently, so the vehicle's other wheels should continue to work if one is blown off. It is claimed that the engine can be removed and replaced in 30 minutes.

The design is modular, and all the components can be removed easily. The protective pod where up to six people can sit is interchangeable to allow easy modification according to the vehicle's role. For example, it can perform as an ambulance, supply vehicle, or jeep. Parts can also be easily replaced for minimum service time. It can travel through terrain that would not be accessible to other civilian vehicles, such as jungle, deep mud, or ruts. Its cabin is made of advanced composite materials. It is claimed that such composite materials can provide protection like metal armour with a composite spall liner, but at a lighter weight, saving fuel. Critical parts such as the crew compartment, engine, fuel tank and transmission are contained within the V-shaped armoured 'spine' that deflects potential blast away from the pod, thus protecting the occupants and key components.

The Ocelot will be the first British military vehicle to meet the MoD's recent Generic Vehicle Architecture (GVA) requirements. The GVA requirements are intended to create a single, standard digital electronic and electrical architecture for UK vehicles.

== History ==
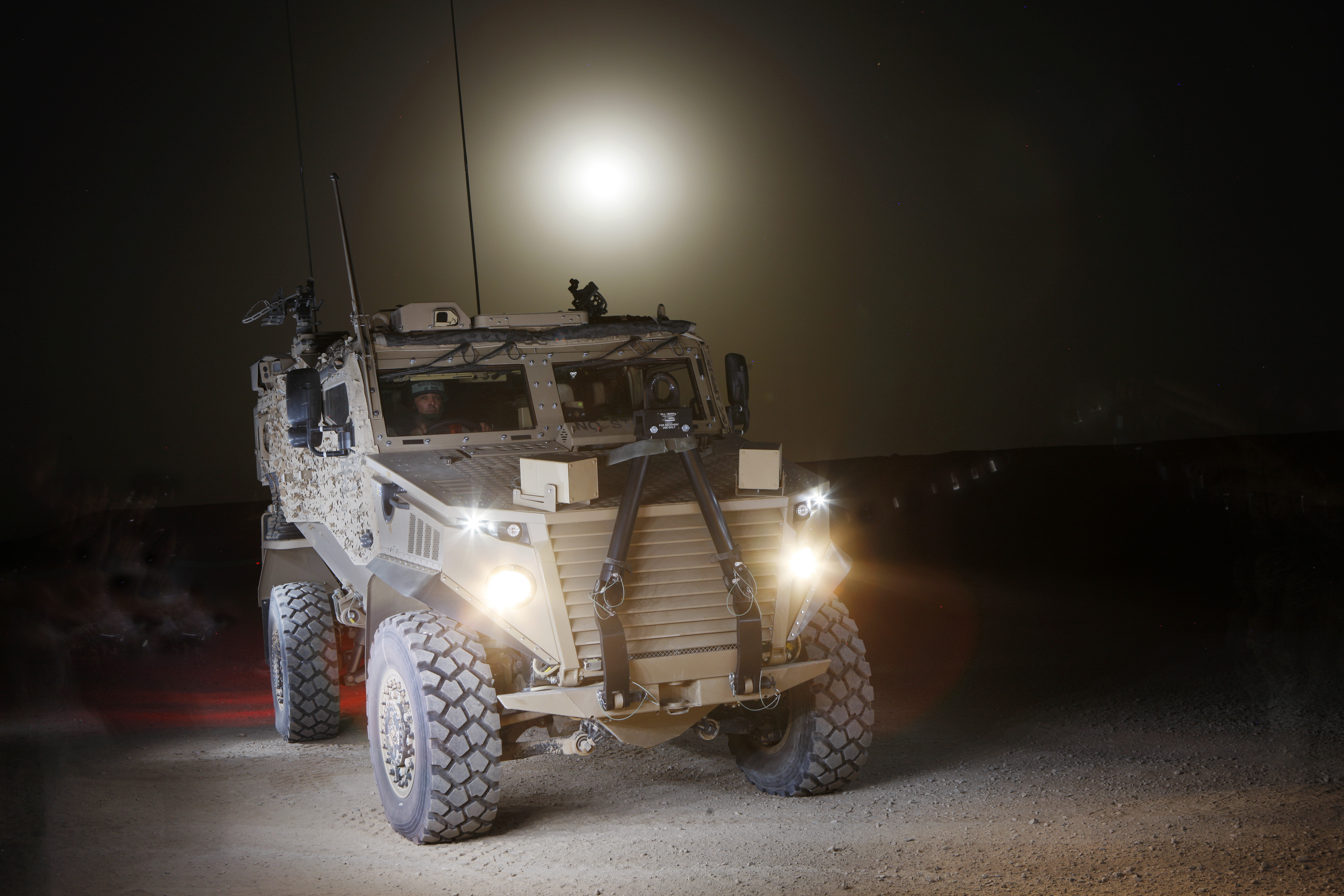
Foxhound shown at Camp Bastion, Helmand, Afghanistan

Force Protection Industries in America and Europe has developed several mine-resistant vehicles with V-shaped hulls since 2000, including the Buffalo and the Cougar (specific variants of which were bought by the British military as the Mastiff, Ridgeback, and Wolfhound, and by the Iraqi military as the Badger). These have demonstrated improved protection of soldiers exposed to blast threats. Both the Buffalo and the Cougar are large and heavy. Force Protection developed the Ocelot to meet the need for a smaller, lighter, more versatile vehicle that could still provide protection against blasts.

The Ocelot was first shown in September 2009 by Force Protection Europe at the Defence Systems and Equipment International exhibition in London. Two were purchased by the British Ministry of Defence (MoD) in April 2010 for further testing.

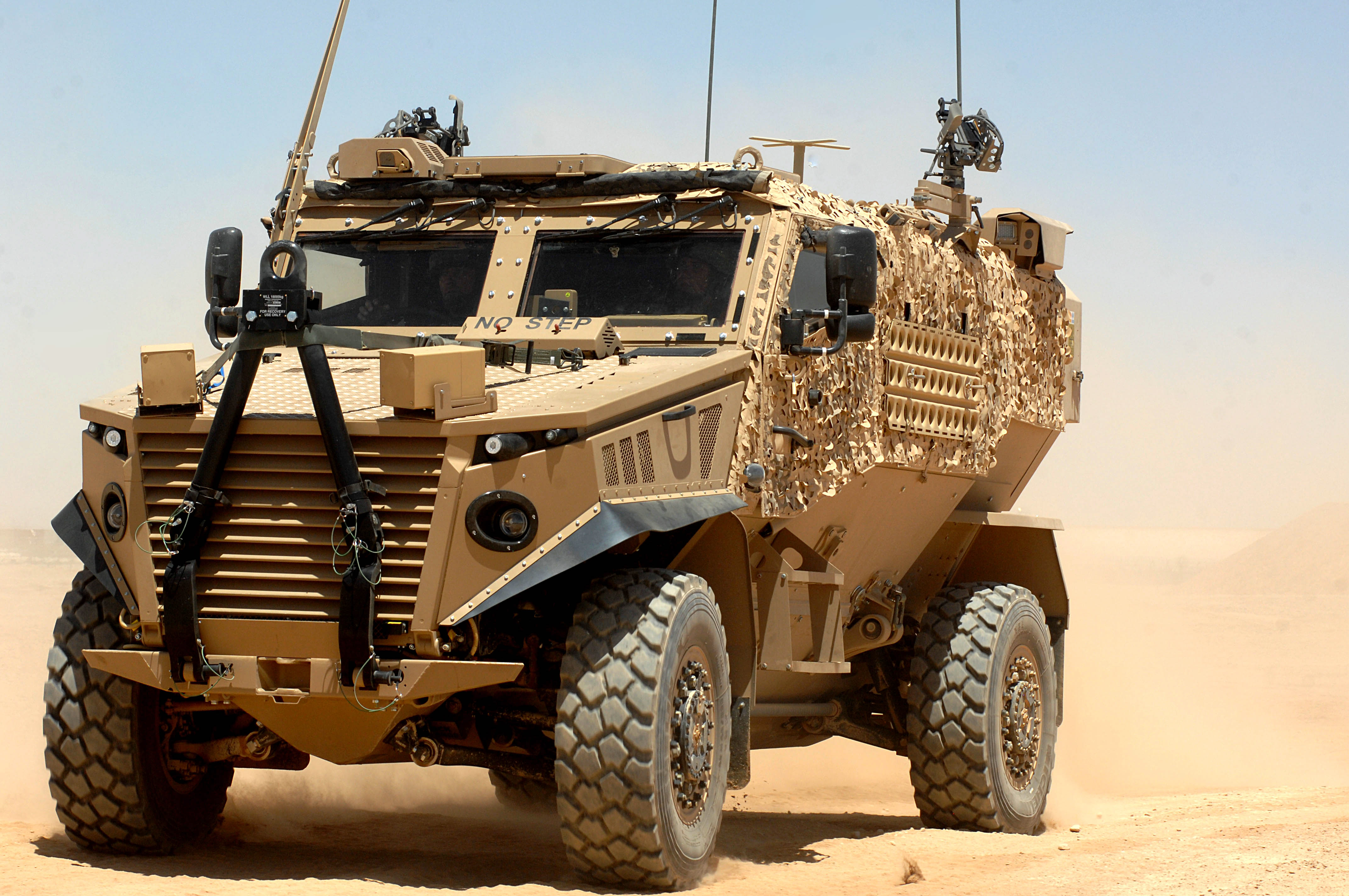
A Foxhound pictured at Camp Bastion, Afghanistan.

On 22 September 2010, the MoD announced that the Ocelot would replace the Snatch Land Rover, the previous LPPV, which has received criticism for its lack of protection against roadside bombs. The MoD has renamed the vehicle Foxhound in line with the "dog" names given to other wheeled armoured vehicles in British use, such as Mastiff and Ridgeback. The original order was for 300 vehicles at a cost of £270 million, with another 25 ordered in 2012 at a cost of £30 million.

On 17 June 2012, it was announced by the MoD that the Foxhound had been delivered to Afghanistan and was undergoing final tests and evaluation before being deployed on operations.

On 18 January 2015, Defense News reported that General Dynamics was offering Ocelot to Canada as a replacement for its special forces Humvees.

== See also ==
- Supacat Protected Vehicle 400 series (SPV400)
- Bushmaster Protected Mobility Vehicle
