= Generic Vehicle Architecture =

Military vehicle standard of the UK Ministry of Defence

The Generic Vehicle Architecture (GVA) approach is the approach taken by the UK MOD to design the electronic and power architectures for military vehicles. It also includes requirements for standardisation of the Human Machine interface. The main requirements for this approach are published in Defence Standard 23-009

Land platforms are typically in-service for many years and are subject to significant updates throughout life. Recent experience has shown how there is a need to be able to update platforms quickly in order to address new threats and scenarios. The traditional approach to platform design with stand alone sub-systems results in stove piped upgrades with integration conflicts, a proliferation of crew controls and displays, power conflicts, lack of exploitation of data and lack of standardisation across the fleet with training and maintenance issues. All these issues lead to a significantly higher cost of ownership throughout life.

The GVA approach is based on established systems engineering principles to define a generic architecture that requires open implementation standards to support cost effective integration of sub-systems on land platforms (electronically, electrically and physically). The Director of Land Equipment (DLE) has mandated the application of the GVA Approach and the associated GVA Defence Standard 23-009 for all future land vehicle platform procurement, current vehicle platform refurbishment and upgrade programmes. GVA is an integral part of the Land Open System Architecture (LOSA) which aims to enable soldiers, vehicles, and bases to work better together thereby increasing operational effectiveness and reducing the systems of systems through life costs.

An integral part of LOSA and GVA is a data standard based on an Object Management Group (OMG) Standard called Model Driven Architecture (MDA). The data standard is called the Land Data Model (LDM) and defines data interfaces and behaviour between components of the modular architecture. This enables interoperability between modules built by different vendors for use in a distributed system. The LDM can be accessed at the Land Open Systems Portal.

== History ==
=== Vehicle Systems Integration (VSI) Research Programme ===
The origins of GVA lie in the MOD research programme. Initially there was SAVE (Systematic Approach to Vehicle Electronics), a 1980s UK Programme based on the concept of producing a series of standard electronic modules, connected by a standard digital data transmission system. The restrictions imposed by this approach inspired the VERDI (Vehicle Electronics Research Defence Initiative) Programme, a collaboration between the Defence Evaluation and Research Agency (DERA) and Industry which demonstrated the possibilities offered by total systems integration and which yielded crucial information for the subsequent definition phase of this work. Following on from VERDI, the UK MoD initiated the VESTA (Vehicle Standards Architecture) initiative in the mid - 1990s, chaired by DERA, to identify standards suitable for systems integration. The VESTA outputs provided a firm foundation for the follow on work undertaken by the VSI Programme.
