= Gila =

Gila may refer to:

== Animals ==
- Gila (fish), a genus of cyprinid fish known as western chubs
- Gila monster, a venomous lizard
- Gila trout, a trout native to the Southwestern United States
- Gila woodpecker, a species of woodpecker found in the Southwestern United States

== Places ==
- Gila County, Arizona
- Gila Mountains (Graham County), Arizona
- Gila Mountains (Yuma County), Arizona
- Gila River, a Colorado River tributary in New Mexico and Arizona
- Gila, New Mexico, a census-designated place
- Gila National Forest, New Mexico
- Gila Wilderness, New Mexico, the world's first wilderness area
- Gila Desert, the informal name of Sonoran Desert, United States and Mexico

== People ==
- Gila (given name), a list of people
- Eloy Gila (born 1988), Spanish footballer
- Miguel Gila (1919–2001), Spanish actor
- Nickname of Alberto Gilardino (born 1982), Italian football manager and former player
- Gila (footballer), Portuguese football player and coach Virgílio José Pereira do Nascimento (born 1967)

== Music ==
- Gila (band), a German krautrock band
  - Gila (album)
- "Gila", a song by Beach House, from the album Devotion

== Other uses ==
- Gila (sternwheeler), a stern-wheel steamboat
- Gila (TV series), a Pakistani romantic television serial
- Gila APC, a South African-designed armoured personnel carrier
- Gila MBPV, a mine protected vehicle from South Africa
- Gila Community College, Gila County, Arizona
- Gila Preparatory Academy, Safford, Arizona, a high school
- A Portuguese name for the fruit of the Cucurbita ficifolia, a species of squash

== See also ==
- Gila City, Arizona, a ghost town
- Gilla (disambiguation)
- Gilas, Iran, a village
