= Gilla =

Gilla or may refer to:

== People ==
=== Irish masculine given name ===
- Gilla Cómáin mac Gilla Samthainde (fl. 1072)
- Gilla Pátraic (died 1084)
- Gilla Aenghus Ua Chlúmháin (died 1143)
- Gilla Cheallaigh Ua hEidhin (died 1153)
- Gilla Asalta (died 1172)
- Gilla Cellaig Ó Ruaidín (died 1204)
- Gilla na Naemh Crom Ó Seachnasaigh (died 1224)
- Giolla Íosa Mac Fir Bisigh (died 1301)
- Gilla Duibin Mac Cruitín (died 1405), Irish musician
- Gilla Dubh Ó Flaithbheartaigh (died 1442), Lord of Iar Connacht and Chief of the Name
- Roger Gilla Dubh Ó Seachnasaigh (1583–1650)

=== Hebrew feminine given name ===
- Gilla Gerzon, a USO leader

=== Stage name ===
- Gilla (singer) (born 1950), an Austrian disco singer

== Places ==
- Gilla, Queensland, a locality in the Toowoomba Region, Queensland, Australia

== See also ==
- Gila (disambiguation)
- Gill (disambiguation)
- Gilli (disambiguation)
- Gilla Band, an Irish post-punk and noise rock band
