= Mahindra Rakshak =

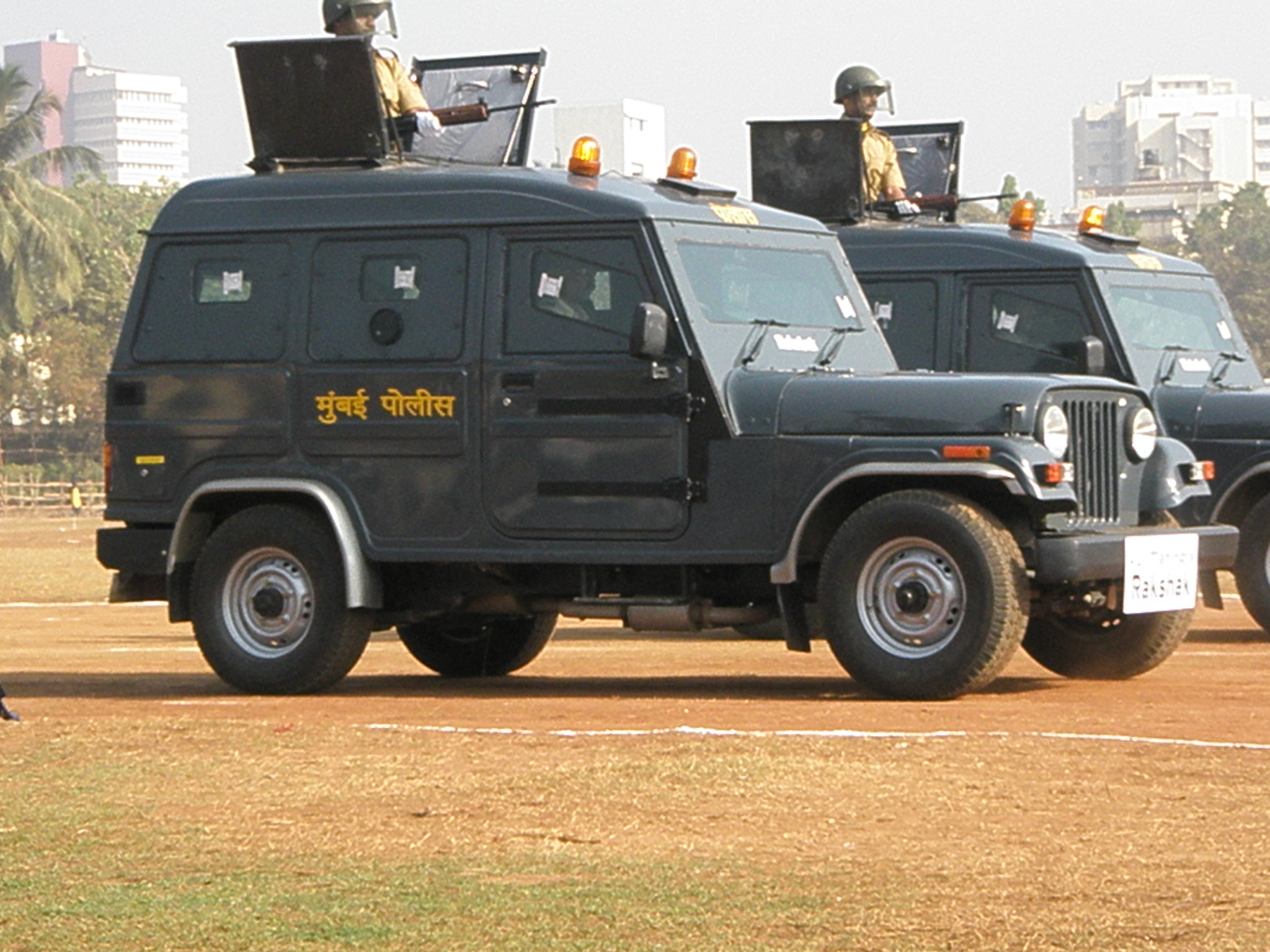
- Mumbai Police Mahindra Rakshak during an exhibition.
- Type: Military light utility vehicle
- Place of origin: India

Service history
- In service: 2000 – Present
- Used by: See Users

Production history
- Designer: Mahindra Defence Systems (Defense Land Systems)
- Manufacturer: Mahindra & Mahindra Defense
- Produced: 2000 – Present
- Variants: See Variants

Specifications
- Crew: 2 crew 4 passengers
- Main armament: Light machine gun mount optional for Rakshak; Gun mount installed for Rakshak Plus with front/rear protection
- Transmission: Manual transmission
- Suspension: 4x4, wheeled

The Mahindra Rakshak (lit. 'Protector') is an armored military light utility vehicle made by Mahindra Defense Systems, based on the chassis of the Mahindra Commander jeep. Primarily used by the Indian army, it is also used by other countries and police in numerous Indian States. The Rakshak is being replaced with the Mahindra Armored Light Specialist Vehicle (ALSV) chosen as its successor.

The Rakshak was designed to be used in counter-insurgency and anti-terrorism operations.

== History ==
The Rakshak jeep was launched in 2000 in collaboration with Plasan. The vehicle was first manufactured under Mahindra Specialties.

The Rakshak was placed under scrutiny in 2008 when the government alleged that the engine used was suitable for 1,600 kg and below and that the vehicle was 2,660 kg, making it very unsafe to use in areas where militants have a strong influence. In response to this allegation, then MDS CEO Brig. Khutab Hai stated that the company had supplied the army with Rakshaks outfitted with new engines with a higher power and increased torque in order improve the vehicle's ability to climb in hilly terrain. It was suggested that the contract was made under a short time with the Comptroller and Auditor General (CAG) investigating if any rules were violated.

In 2009, the Mahindra Special Military Vehicles in Prithla, Faridabad was established with a capacity to manufacture a minimum of 500 vehicles per year.

In 2012, the Mumbai Police requested a tender for bulletproof, run flat types and tubeless rims to replace those are in use.

Jammu & Kashmir Police reported that in 2014, 100 Rakshaks in service had not received replacement engines following flood damage due to lack of supply.

== Design ==
The Rakshak is made with its armored plating made by Plasan Sasa, obtained via technology transfer. The plating consists of composite steel, ultra hardened steel, high performance polyethylene and aramid laminates.

It is meant to be a cost-effective vehicle for security forces that cannot afford high-end armored vehicles.

It is designed to withstand 7.62mm rounds from 10 meters with the flooring armored to withstand grenade explosions. It uses a manual transmission for a four-wheel drive and has the option of installing an air conditioner system. During live fire tests, 41 bullets were fired at the Rakshak and at least one grenade was hurled underneath it.

The vehicle can carry up to 6 persons with 2 seated in front and four at the rear.

== Variants ==
=== Rakshak Plus ===
The Rakshak Plus was publicly displayed at the DEFEXPO 2012 convention, based on Mahindra Scorpio. It weighs 600 kg and has a PTZ surveillance camera installed, which has a 360 degree view with zooming capacity of 500 meters.

It has a 2.2-litre m-Hawk turbocharged and intercooled diesel engine with a roof gun mount, front and back protection plates, five firing ports, fire suppression material in the fuel tank, air conditioning and power steering. It has level 3 armor.

== Users ==
- Ghana: Unknown number of Rakshaks reported to be exported in 2008.
- Guyana: Two Rakshaks used by the Guyana Police Force under the Berbice Police Division.
- India: 200 Rakshaks used by the Indian Army with 800 ordered in 2009, the former purchased in 2005 under a contract for Rs 35.76 crore (US$5,384,615.38 as of 2017). Also used by the Mumbai Police. Also used by police of Jammu and Kashmir, Jharkhand, Andhra Pradesh, Bihar, Manipur, Assam and Chhattisgarh.
- Nepal: Unknown number of Rakshaks reported to be exported in 2008.
- Sri Lanka: Unknown number of Rakshaks reported to be exported in 2008.
