= Vehicle registration plates of India =

India
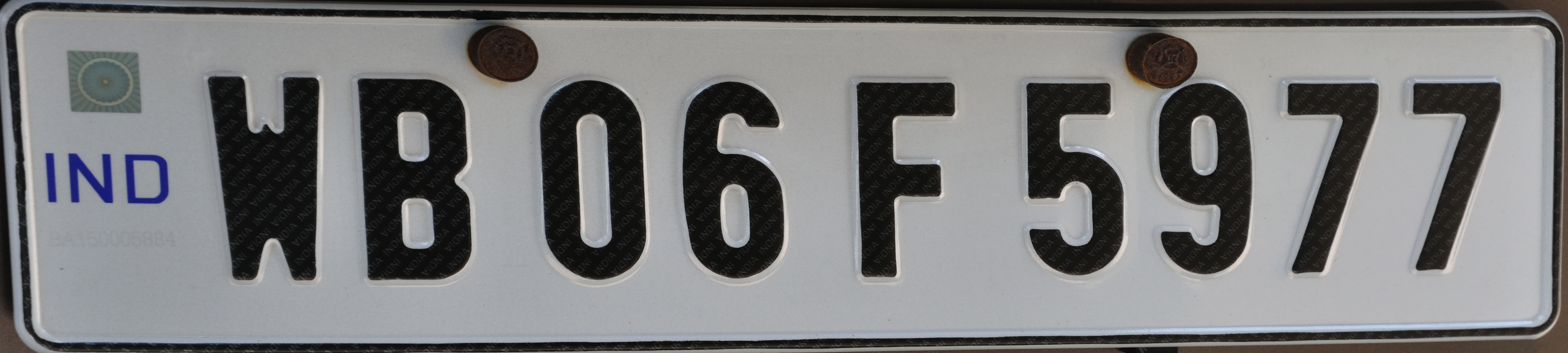
- High Security Registration Plate (HSRP) for a private LMV
- Country: India
- Country code: IND

Current series
- Name: HSRP
- Size: 34 cm x 20 cm; Medium & Heavy Commercial Vehicles (MCV, HCV); 50 cm x 12 cm; Light Motor Vehicle (LMV); 20 cm x 10 cm; Two-wheeler (Rear); Tractor (Rear); Three-wheeler; 28.5 cm x 4.5 cm; Two-wheeler (Front); Tractor (Front)
- Material: Aluminium with Chromium hologram
- Serial format: Refer section Private and commercial vehicles: Special formats: VA (Vintage) series; BH (Bharat) series
- Front plate: Mandatory
- Rear plate: Mandatory
- Colour (front): Refer section Colour coding
- Colour (rear): Refer section Colour coding
- Introduced: 2005 (21 years ago)
- Designer: Ministry of Road Transport and Highways

Availability
- Issued by: Regional Transport Office of relevant district
- Manufactured by: Vendors authorised by Ministry of Road Transport and Highways

History
- First issued: August 1947 (79 years ago)

All motorised vehicles (and trailers) plying on public roads in India are tagged with a unique registration or licence number. The vehicle registration plate (known colloquially as number plate) is issued by a Regional Transport Office (RTO), the district-level authority on vehicular matters in the respective state or Union Territory. Registration plates are also issued by Indian Ministry of Defence and Ministry of External Affairs where applicable. The number plates are mandatory on both front and rear of the vehicle and are required to be in modern Hindu-Arabic numerals with latin letters. Complete specification of registration plates are specified under the HSRP: High security registration plate rules.

The international vehicle registration code for India is IND.

== Colour coding ==
Registration plates are specified in multiple combinations of text colour and background colour to distinctively identify different categories of vehicles.

Following combinations have been specified:

Vehicle Category	Sub-category (if any)	Text Colour	Background Colour	Example
Permanent Registration
Private	-	Black	White	AN 01 Z 0123
Private	Electric	White	Green	AN 01 Z 0123
Commercial (Transport)	-	Black	Yellow	AN 01 Z 0123
Commercial (Transport)	Electric	Yellow	Green	AN 01 Z 0123
Commercial (Rental)	-	Yellow	Black	AN 01 Z 0123
Commercial (Rental)	Electric	Yellow	Green	AN 01 Z 0123
Indian Armed Forces	-	White	Black	↑24B 123456Z
Indian Armed Forces	Electric	White	Green	↑24B 123456Z
Indian Armed Forces	Military Police	Red	White	↑24B 123456Z
Diplomatic mission	Embassy, United Nations, or international organisation	White	Blue	199 CD 99; 99 UN 99; 99 IOD 99
Diplomatic mission	Consulate	Yellow	Blue	199 CC 0123
Non-permanent Registration
Temporary (awaiting permanent)	-	Red	Yellow	T0124AN0123A
Trade (Manufacturers, dealers etc.)	-	White	Red	AN01C0123TC0123

For colour coding no longer in use, refer section Historical colour coding.

== Permanent registration format ==
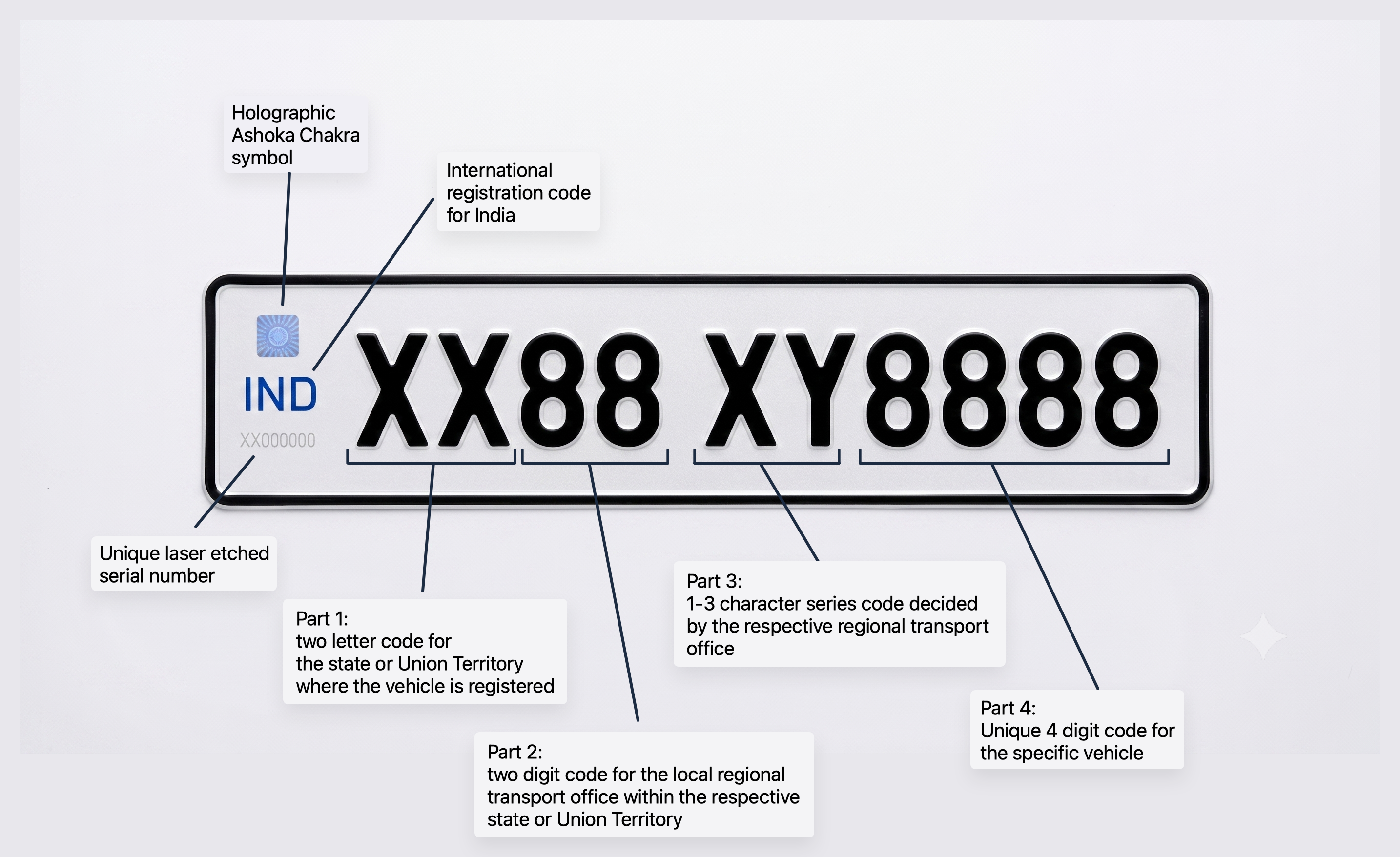
Default registration format for private and commercial vehicles as per Motor Vehicles Act, 1988.

=== Private and commercial vehicles ===
The current format for the registration of private and commercial came into force on 1 July 1989 as part of Motor Vehicles Act, 1988. The format consists of four parts:

- Part 1: Two-letter state code; two letters which indicates the State or Union Territory in which the vehicle is registered.
- Part 2: RTO number; a two-digit number allocated to a district RTO within the respective state or Union Territory. Due to heavy volume of vehicle registration, unique numbers may be allocated to multiple RTOs within a single district.
- Part 3: Single or multiple letters; consists of one, two or three letters or may not exist at all. These show the ongoing registration series of respective RTO and can indirectly indicate the number of registered vehicles (in some cases, also indicate vehicle type). The letters 'I' and 'O' are not used here to avoid confusion with digits 1 or 0.
- Part 4: Unique number between 1 and 9999; issued sequentially and unique to each registration. Leading zeros are included.

The advantage with this format is that the state and district where vehicle has been registered is immediately identifiable with initial few characters.

Vintage series (VA) and Bharat series (BH) registration have their own unique format. For formats prior to 1 July 1989, refer section Historical registration formats.

==== VA (Vintage) series ====
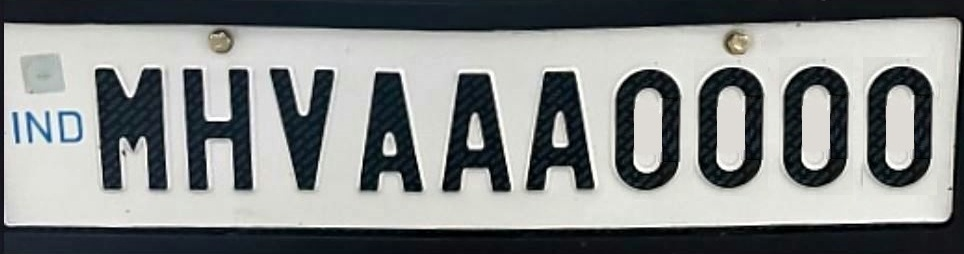
Sample VA-series vehicle registration plate, for a vehicle registered in Maharashtra.

On 15 July 2021, the Ministry of Road Transport issued a notification regarding a special registration process for vintage vehicles. It was introduced to provide exemption from various pollution and scrappage norms and thus, facilitate promotion of heritage of vintage vehicles. A vehicle is eligible for this registration process if it fulfils following criteria:

- Two-wheeler or car (specifically, categories L1, L2 and M1)
- More than 50 years have passed since first registration
- Vehicle is maintained in its original form

Vintage series registration however restricts free usage of the vehicle. Vehicle may only be used for specific purposes on public roads (e.g. vintage car rally) and not for generic private or commercial use. VA-series registration has a unique format:

Vintage Registration Format
AB VA XX 1234

Characters are representative of following:

- 'AB': Part 1: Two-letter state code; two letters which indicates the State or Union Territory in which the vehicle is registered
- 'VA': Short for ‘Vintage’
- 'XX': Two letter sequence, starting from ‘AA’, followed by ‘AB’ and so on. 'O' and 'I' are not used here to avoid confusion with the digits 0 or 1
- '1234': Part 4: Unique number between 1 and 9999 with leading zeros

==== BH (Bharat) series ====
Sample BH-series vehicle registration plate, for a vehicle registered in 2021.

On 26 August 2021, the Ministry of Road Transport issued a notification regarding a unified pan-India registration of private vehicles. This special registration process was introduced to ease inter-state mobility by eliminating the hassles of re-registering a vehicle when its owner relocates to a new state or Union Territory.

BH-series registration can be issued to public sector employees of central and state governments, and also to private sector employees of firms with offices in four or more states or union territories. BH-series registration follows a unique format:

Bharat Registration Format
12 BH 3456 XX

Characters are representative of following:

- '12': Represents the last two digits of the year in which the vehicle was registered, e.g. '22' for a vehicle registered in 2022
- 'BH': Short for Bharat (coequal name for India)
- '3456': Unique number between 1 and 9999, with leading zeros
- 'XX': One or two letters. Sequence starting from ‘A’, followed by ‘B’ and so on. 'O' and 'I' are not used here to avoid confusion with the digits 0 or 1

=== Vehicles of Indian Armed Forces ===
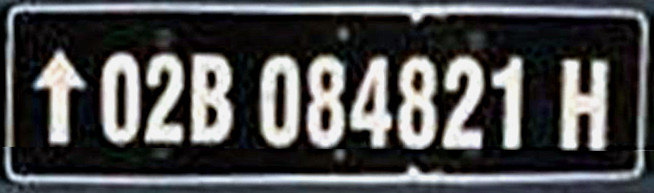
Registration plate of an Indian military vehicle procured in 2002

Registration of vehicles belonging to Indian Armed Forces (Army, Navy and Air Force) is administered by Indian Ministry of Defence. Following registration format is used:

Armed Forces Registration Format
↑ 01Z 012345A

Characters are representative as following:

- '↑': The first character is an upward-pointing Broad Arrow, its usage is a legacy of the UK Board of Ordnance
- '01': Represents the last two digits of the year in which the armed forces procured the vehicle, e.g. '22' for a vehicle procured in 2022.
- 'Z': Represents the type or class of vehicle:
  - A - Motorised two-wheelers (e.g. motorcycles)
  - B - LMV i.e. Light Motor Vehicle (e.g. passenger cars)
  - C - Truck (<3 tonnes) or pick-up truck
  - D - Truck (>3 tonnes)
  - E - High Mobility vehicle (i.e. Multi-axle driven trucks: 4x4, 6x6 and so on)
  - F - Light specialist vehicle (e.g. ATVs, Mahindra Armado, ATOR N1200)
  - G - Trailer
  - H - Truck with material handling capability (e.g. Tata LPTA 2038C)
  - J - Snow removal vehicle
  - K - Ambulance
  - P - Generic support vehicles (e.g. Bus, Fire Truck, Tanker, Recovery Vehicle etc.)
  - Q - Construction vehicles (e.g. Backhoe loader)
  - R - Customised Vehicles for niche application (e.g. Mine Protected Vehicle, missile launchers, tactical communication equipment etc.)
  - X - Active Combat Vehicle (e.g. tank, armoured personnel carrier)
- '012345': Six digit unique serial number
- 'A': Last character is a check letter.

=== Vehicles of diplomatic missions ===
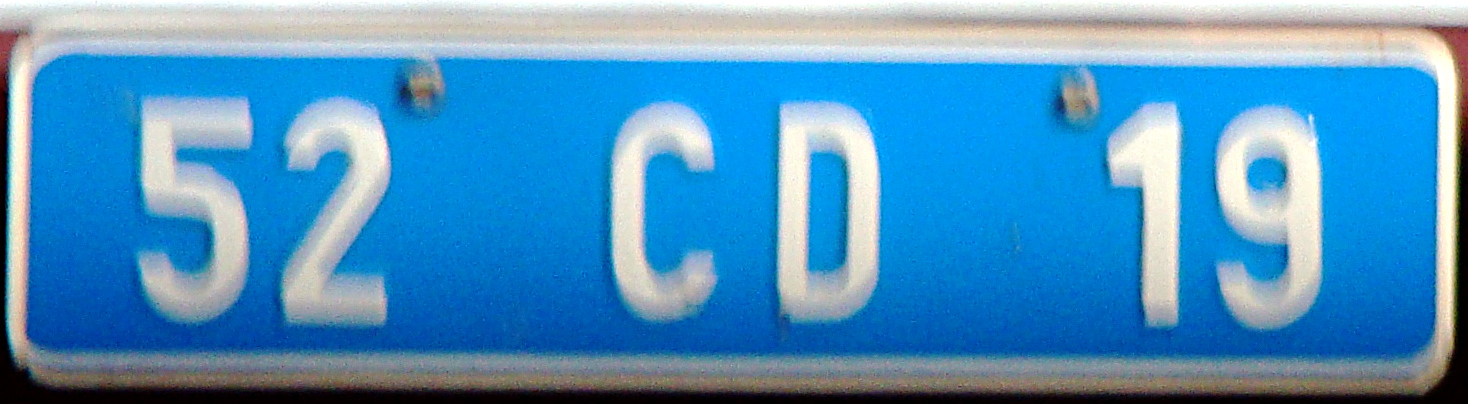
Registration plate of a vehicle belonging to diplomatic mission of The Netherlands

Registration of vehicles belonging to diplomatic missions is administered by Indian Ministry of External Affairs. Following registration format is used:

Diplomatic Mission Registration Format
123 XX 4567

Characters are representative of following:

- '123': Unique number of at most 3 digits allocated to the diplomatic mission by the Ministry of External Affairs (see list below). Leading zero is not used.
- 'XX': Represents the type of mission to which the vehicle is registered:
  - 'CD' which is short for corps diplomatique, for vehicles registered to an embassy
  - 'CC' which is short for corps consulaire, for vehicles registered to a consulate
  - 'UN' which is short for United Nations, for vehicles registered to a UN organisation or one of its specialised agencies
  - 'IOD' which is short for 'International Organisation Diplomat', for vehicles registered to international organisations (excluding UN agencies) which are recognised by Ministry of External Affairs. List of these organisations is available here
- '4567': Unique number of atmost 4 digits issued sequentially (leading zeroes are not used)
  - Number '1' is reserved for vehicle(s) used by the head of respective diplomatic mission e.g. an ambassador. To distinguish multiple vehicles of the head of mission, a suffix is added e.g. '1A', '1B' and so on.

Vehicles belonging to diplomatic missions are granted the level of diplomatic immunity or consular immunity corresponding to whom the vehicle has been attributed to by the Ministry of External Affairs. Immunity is void if a UN, CD or CC vehicle is driven in absence of an accredited member of the diplomatic or consular corps.

Unique numbers allocated to different diplomatic missions for the CD and CC registrations:

Number	Country
1	Afghanistan
2	Algeria
3	Egypt
4	Argentina
5	Australia
6	Austria
7	Bangladesh
8	Belgium
9	Bhutan
10	Brazil
11	Britain (United Kingdom)
12	Bulgaria
13	Cameroon
14	Cyprus
15	Canada
16	Chile
17	China
18	Colombia
19	Cuba
20	Czech Republic
21	Denmark
22	Brunei
23	Ethiopia
24	Finland
25	France
26	Angola
27	Germany
28	Ghana
29	Greece
30	Kyrgyzstan
31	Holy See (Vatican City)
32	Hungary
33	Indonesia
34	Iran
35	Iraq
36	Ireland
37	Italy
38	Japan
39	Jordan
40	Kenya
41	North Korea
42	South Korea
43	Kuwait
44	Laos
45	Gabon
46	Malaysia
47	Mauritius
48	Mexico
49	Mongolia
50	Morocco
51	Nepal
52	Netherlands
53	New Zealand
54	Nicaragua
55	Nigeria
56	Poland
57	Portugal
58	Romania
59	Saudi Arabia
60	Serbia
61	Sierra Leone
62	Singapore
63	Slovenia
64	Somalia
65	Spain
66	Sudan
67	Sweden
68	Switzerland
69	Syria
70	Tanzania
71	Thailand
72	Trinidad and Tobago
73	Turkey
74	Uganda
75	Russia
76	United Arab Emirates
77	United States
78	Uruguay
79	Venezuela
80	Vietnam
84	Democratic Republic of the Congo
85	Slovakia
87	Zambia
89	Pakistan
93	Belarus
94	Ukraine
95	South Africa
97	Senegal
98	Uzbekistan
99	Kazakhstan
102	Iceland
105	Cambodia
104	Tunisia
106	Yemen
109	Israel
111	Rwanda
112	Bosnia and Herzegovina
113	Suriname
117	Luxembourg
119	Eritrea
120	Azerbaijan
121	Maldives
122	Fiji
123	Ivory Coast
125	Ecuador
126	Djibouti
128	Tajikistan
133	Botswana
134	Dominican Republic
135	Malawi
137	Malta
141	Burkina Faso
145	Burundi
147	Georgia
149	Mali
152	Niger
153	Guinea
155	South Sudan
156	Estonia
157	Bolivia
159	Latvia
160	Equatorial Guinea

== Format for private and commercial vehicles ==
Here is a detailed overview of the format for permanent registration of private and commercial vehicles.

=== Part 1: Two-letter state code ===
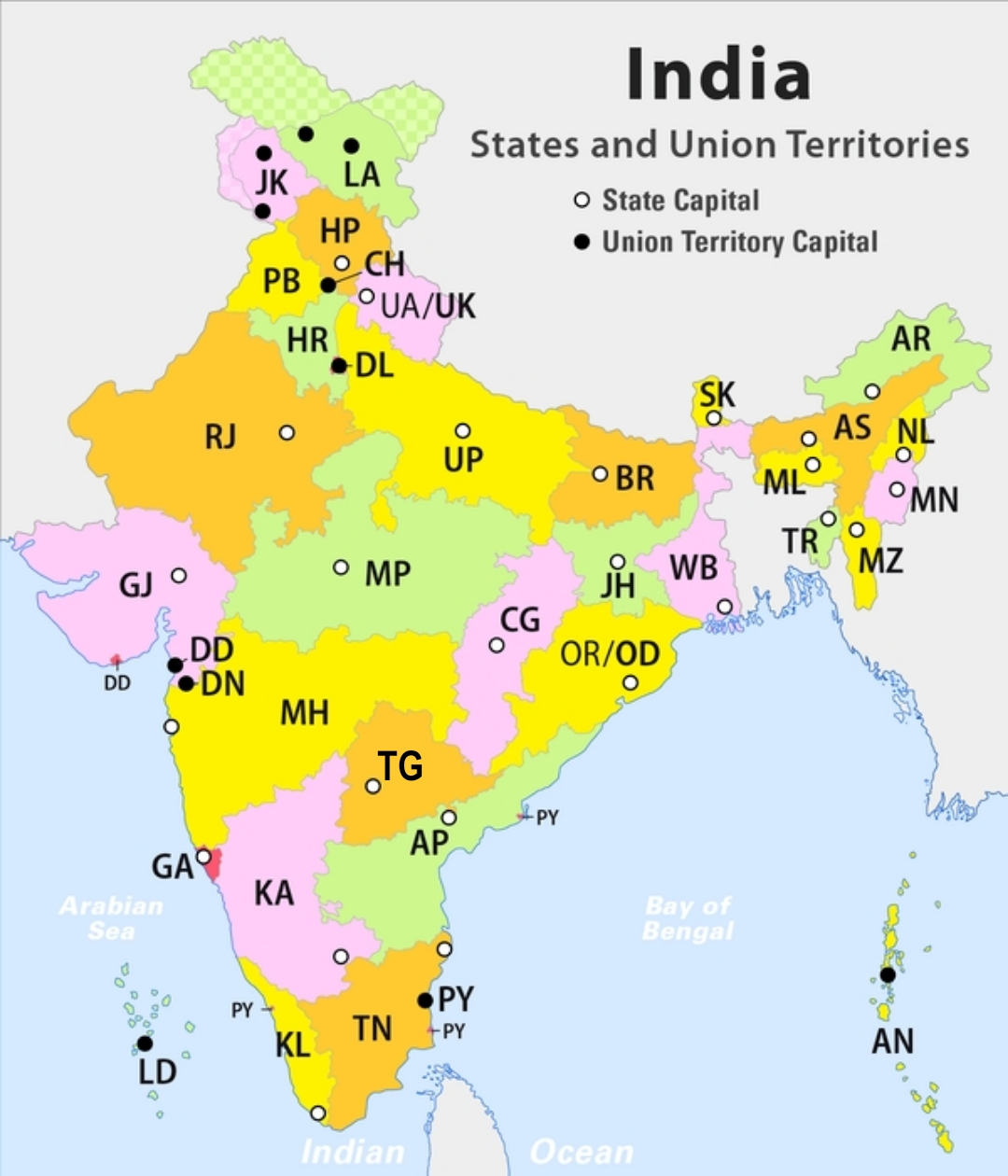
Two-letter state codes of India as used on vehicles

All Indian states and Union Territories have a designated two-letter code. This code referencing came into force on 1 July 1989 as part of Motor Vehicles Act, 1988. Before that, both state and district had to be decoded from a three letter code which led to a fair degree of confusion on a national level and format was not sustainable.

A specific state or union territory maybe chosen to register a vehicle due to differences in the amount of taxes involved in registration process. One such example is of Puducherry, where many luxury cars have been known to be registered by residents of other states, sometimes fraudulently, leading to crackdowns by those states.

==== Current codes ====
Two-letter codes currently in use for different states and union territories are as follows:

Code	State or Union Territory
AN	Andaman and Nicobar Islands
AP	Andhra Pradesh
AR	Arunachal Pradesh
AS	Assam
BR	Bihar
CG	Chhattisgarh
CH	Chandigarh
DD	Dadra and Nagar Haveli and Daman and Diu
DL	Delhi
GA	Goa
GJ	Gujarat
HP	Himachal Pradesh
HR	Haryana
JH	Jharkhand
JK	Jammu and Kashmir
KA	Karnataka
KL	Kerala
LA	Ladakh
LD	Lakshadweep
MH	Maharashtra
ML	Meghalaya
MN	Manipur
MP	Madhya Pradesh
MZ	Mizoram
NL	Nagaland
OD	Odisha
PB	Punjab
PY	Puducherry
RJ	Rajasthan
SK	Sikkim
TG	Telangana
TN	Tamil Nadu
TR	Tripura
UK	Uttarakhand
UP	Uttar Pradesh
WB	West Bengal

==== Former codes ====
Codes no longer in use for new registrations but still the valid code for already registered vehicles:

In Active Use	Code	State or Union Territory	Reason for change
22 November 2000 - 31 October 2007	UA	Uttaranchal	State renamed from 'Uttaranchal' to Uttarakhand [UK]
1 July 1989 - 30 August 2012	OR	Orissa	State renamed from 'Orissa' to Odisha [OD]
1 July 1989 - 25 January 2020	DN	Dadra and Nagar Haveli	Erstwhile UT merged to create new UT of Dadra and Nagar Haveli and Daman and Diu [DD]
18 June 2014 - 14 March 2024	TS	Telangana	State code reverted to original proposal [TG]

=== Part 2: RTO number ===
As all states have at least two districts, the district's RTO is the authority for registering vehicles. A vehicle can be registered in a particular district if the owner has a registered residence or business entity in that district. Each RTO is allotted unique two digit number(s) and vehicles registered with a specific RTO have the corresponding RTO number as part of their registration number. Thus, in most cases, district of registration can be uniquely identified from the registration number. Andhra Pradesh follows a separate format and a common district number (AP 39 as of 2023) is used across all districts/RTOs in the state.

Due to heavy volume of vehicle registration in highly populated districts, multiple RTOs may operate within that district, with each RTO being allotted a unique number. As an example, Chennai has 15 RTOs in different parts of district, each with distinct numbers: TN 01, TN 02, TN 03, TN 04, TN 05, TN 07, TN 08, TN 09, TN 10, TN 11, TN 12, TN 13, TN 14, and TN 22. In such cases, each number corresponds to a specific region within a single district.

In some cases, a number is reserved for certain category of vehicles, and a single RTO thus uses multiple numbers. As an example, Rohtak RTO (in Haryana) uses number HR 12 for private vehicles and HR 46 for commercial vehicles, thus both '12' and '46' correspond to Rohtak district. In some states/UTs, numbers can be reserved for even more specific categories, for example in Meghalaya, ML 01 is reserved for government vehicles, ML 02 for police department and ML 03 for state transport department. In such cases, RTO number no longer corresponds to a specific district.

Union territory and capital, Delhi has the exception of not using leading zero in the RTO numbers, and vehicle registration number can therefore start as ‘DL 1’ (instead of ‘DL 01’).

Overview of special usage of numbers in states/UTs:

State/UT	Remarks
Andhra Pradesh	A common district number (AP 40 as of 2023) is used across all districts in the state.
Assam	AS 20 is reserved for state transport department and AS 30 and AS 31 is reserved for police department
Chhattisgarh	CG 01 is reserved for vehicles of office of governor, CG 02 for all state government vehicles and CG 03 for police department
Haryana	Different numbers are used for commercial and private vehicles in some districts
Himachal Pradesh	HP 01 and HP 02 are reserved for tourist vehicles (buses and taxis)
Kerala	KL 15 is reserved for the Kerala State Road Transport Corporation buses
Madhya Pradesh	MP 01 is reserved for vehicles of office of governor, MP 02 for all state government vehicles and MP 03 for police department
Meghalaya	ML 01 is reserved for government vehicles, ML 02 for police department and ML 03 for state transport department
Nagaland	NL 10 and NL 11 is reserved for government vehicles, for non-transport and transport vehicle respectively
Punjab	PB 01 is reserved for taxis
West Bengal	Different numbers were used earlier for commercial and private vehicles by districts

=== Part 3: Single or multiple letters ===
The default use of letter(s) is as registration series of an RTO i.e. when initial 9999 registrations have been done and all unique 4-digit numbers used up, a prefix A is added and the number sequence reset to 1. Thus, letter(s) can indirectly indicate the number of registered vehicles (in some cases, also indicate vehicle class).

In Tamil Nadu, the letter G is reserved for Government (both the Union Government of India and State Governments) vehicles and the letter N is reserved for State Transport Buses, while A to F, H to M and P to Z are for passenger vehicles of all kinds, including commercial vehicles. For e.g. TN 60 AG 3333 could be a government vehicle registered in Theni, whereas a TN 58 N 4006 could be a government Bus registered in Madurai District.

In Andhra Pradesh and Telangana, the letter Z is reserved for the State Road Transport (APSRTC and TSRTC) buses (AP**Z, TS**Z, and so on). The letter P is reserved for the states' police vehicles. The letters T, U, V, W, X, and Y are reserved for commercial ones, continuing as TA, TB..., UA, UB... and so on, whereas the rest of the letters are reserved for private passenger vehicles of all kinds.

In Assam, the letter C is used to register commercial vehicles, continuing as AC, BC, etc.

In Jammu and Kashmir, the letter Y is used for all government buses. Other letters and their combinations are used to register all kinds of private and commercial vehicles.

In Bihar, all RTOs assign the letter P to passenger vehicles (Commercial vehicles and private MUVs/SUVs) and G for goods vehicles. For example, BR 01 PC 2433' is a BSRTC bus in Patna. However, all registrations are common for private vehicles.

In Maharashtra, the two letters in each RTO is classified for a different kind of vehicle, e.g. MH 14 BT is assigned for MSRTC buses built in the bus building facility Pimpri, MH 02 CR is for commercial vehicles in Mumbai, MH 10 CJ is for two wheelers in Sangli, MH 04 GM is for cars in Thane, MH 12 JK is for special purpose vehicles in Pune and MH 47 D is for autorickshaws in North Mumbai.

In Karnataka, blank, A, B, C, D is used for commercial vehicles; T for tractors and trailers; E, H, J, K, L, Q, R, S, U, V, W, X, Y for two-wheelers; M, N, P, Z for private passenger vehicles. G is used for Government Vehicles (including police vehicles and ambulances), and F is used for KSRTC/NWKRTC/NEKRTC/BMTC buses and smaller vehicles owned by the corporation, like flying squad MUVs. Additional letters are added as each series is exhausted, e.g., M, MA, F, FA, etc.

In Goa, the letter X is reserved for the State Road Transport (Kadamba Transport Corporation) buses (e.g. GA 03 X 0109). The letters T, U, V, W, Y, Z are reserved for commercial vehicles, whereas the letter G is reserved for government vehicles. Again, the two letter in each RTO is classified for a different kind of vehicle, e.g. GA 07 C is for cars in Panaji and GA 03 AB is for two wheelers in Mapusa.

In Uttar Pradesh, districts use G for government vehicles and any letter for commercial. Currently most districts use T, AT, BT, etc.; some use N, AN, BN, etc., and a few use B, H, etc.

In Uttarakhand, the letter C is reserved for goods vehicles, T for Taxis, P for public transport vehicles and G for government vehicles and A, B, D to O, Q to S, and U to Z for private passenger vehicles of all kinds, with an additional letter added later such as TA, CA, GA, PA and so on.

Sikkim issues the letter P as prefix for all types of private vehicles and T for taxis, J for commercial jeeps, B for buses, and Z, D for other commercial vehicles. For state transport buses, the SK 04 XXXX series of Jorethang was used and have now gone back to register them under B series.

In Gujarat, government vehicles have number plate with letter G and GJ, which is reserved for government firm vehicles. (e.g. : GJ 18 G 5123 and GJ 18 GJ 6521). All other letters except G are used by passenger vehicles. The letters T, U, V, W, X, Y, Z are reserved for commercial vehicles and goes on in the series AT, AU, ..., BT, BU, ..., and so on.

Also, the number series GJ 18 Y is reserved for the Gujarat State Road Transport Corporation (GSRTC) buses. GJ 18 V was used earlier. After the completion of this series GJ 18 Y was used. Currently, GJ 18 Z is in use. All other letters used for passengers. Also a letter is prefixed for usage in all classes of vehicles, e.g. GJ 01 J to JS are for two wheelers in Ahmedabad, and GJ 01 R to RZ are reserved for private four wheelers in Ahmedabad. However, after the exhaustion of private series in Ahmedabad, vehicles are being registered with the T to Z suffix pattern to meet the demand.

In Delhi, the following letters are used for registration- A for ambulances, B for mini buses, C for cars, F for numbers on demand for private vehicles, G for trucks, K for school vehicles, L for trucks, N for self-drive vehicles, P is for buses, Q for commercial three-wheelers, R for autorickshaws and radio taxis, S for two-wheelers, T for city taxis, Y for private taxis, V, W, E, U, M, Z for other commercial vehicles. DL 1 at Mall Road registers only A, E, G, K, L, M, P, Q, R, T, U, V, W, Y and Z.

In Chandigarh, the following letters are used for registration: T is for trucks, and G is for government vehicles.

In Rajasthan, the following letters are used for registration: M, S, B for two wheelers, C for cars, P for buses, G for trucks, T for taxis and tourist passenger vehicles. Earlier, numbers between 1 and 50 were used, e.g. RJ 14 2M and RJ 14 6C were used for vehicles but now this system has been stopped.

=== Part 4: Unique number between 1 and 9999 ===
The last four numbers are unique to the vehicle, and leading zeros are part of the format. Special or unique numbers (e.g. 3333, 0001 etc.) are often auctioned and fetch a high premium.

Prior to 2005, Karnataka used to charge ₹1000 for obtaining a unique last four digit number. These numbers used to be issued either from the current running series or from one or two future series. When the numbering system was computerized, numbers could be issued from any future series. However the Karnataka RTO steeply hiked these charges to ₹6,000 if the number to be obtained is in the current series, and ₹25,000 if it was to be issued from a future series. It was increased again in 2010 from ₹6,000 to ₹20,000, and from ₹25,000 to ₹75,000.

As of 2007, Maharashtra has increased the price of unique numbers to the range of ₹25,000 to ₹1,25,000. In 2012, Maharashtra increased the price from ₹1,25,000 to ₹2,00,000.

== Non-permanent registration format ==
=== Temporary registration format ===
After a new vehicle is purchased and a permanent registration number is yet to be assigned, a temporary registration number is issued by RTO of the district from where the vehicle was purchased.

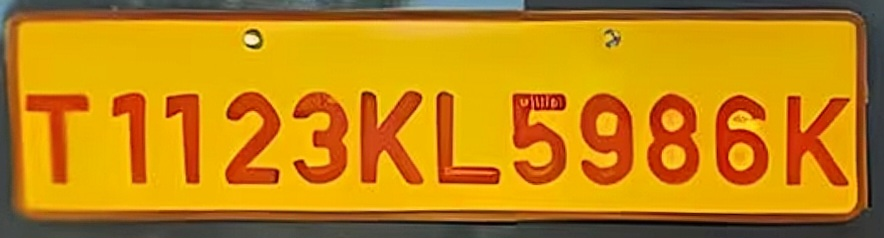
Vehicle registration plate with temporary number, for a vehicle purchased in November 2023 in Kerala.

On 31 March 2021, the Ministry of Road Transport issued a notification regarding amendment to Motor Vehicles Act. Rule 53C in the amendment introduced a homogenised alphanumeric format for temporary registration:

Temporary Registration Format
T MMYY AA 0123 ZZ

Characters are representative of following:

- 'T': Registration number always starts with character 'T' to represent 'Temporary'
- 'MMYY': Represents the month and year in which vehicle was purchased e.g. '1223' for vehicle purchased in December 2023
- 'AA': Represents the state in which vehicle is purchased, same code as specified in Part 1: Two-letter State Codes is used
- '0123': Four-digit number issued sequentially
- 'ZZ': One or two letters, sequence starting from ‘A’, followed by ‘B’ and so on. 'O' and 'I' are not used here to avoid confusion with the digits 0 or 1.

Example: T1123LA0123A for a vehicle purchased in Ladakh in November 2023

Temporary registration has a validity of up to six months, states however may use a stricter validity time. During this period owner must obtain a permanent registration from the RTO of their choosing. Some states may only allow limited use of vehicles with temporary registration.

To register a vehicle, it may need to be presented to the RTO, where a Motor Vehicle Inspector will verify the applicant's address and other details, confirm that the engine and chassis numbers are identical to what is written in the application and issues a permanent registration certificate which is usually valid for 20 years.

=== Trade registration format ===
Government issues trade certificate to businesses which deal with unregistered vehicles and therefore, need to be exempted from the legal requirement of plying vehicles on road with a (permanent or temporary) registration number. Business or agency which may use trade certificate can be a vehicle manufacturer, dealer, vehicle testing agency or a vehicle importer.

Registration authority allots a group of trade registration numbers to the holder of a trade certificate. Trade number is not assigned to a specific vehicle directly by the registration authority (like permanent or temporary number), the holder of trade certificate instead assigns a number to a vehicle themselves from their available allotment. Trade number can only be used on vehicles of category for which it has been issued and should not be assigned to more than one vehicle at once. Trade registration number can be valid for up to five years.

Vehicle registration plate with trade number, for a test car registered in Chengalpattu in Tamil Nadu.

On 14 September 2022, the Ministry of Road Transport issued a notification regarding amendments to trade certificate and trade registration number. A homogenised alphanumeric format for trade registration number was also introduced:

Trade Registration Format
AB 12 Z 0123 TC 0001

Characters are representative of following:

- 'AB': Represents the state in which institute is located, same code as specified in Part 1: Two-letter State Codes
- '12': Represents the district or RTO which issues the trade registration number, same number as defined in Part 2: District Number
- 'Z': Represents the category of vehicle for which the trade registration number has been issued. Character used for different categories are:
  - A – Two-wheel vehicle (e.g. motorcycle, scooter)
  - B – Invalid carriage (vehicle designed specifically for disabled person)
  - C – Light motor vehicle (e.g. car)
  - D – Medium passenger motor vehicle (e.g. minibus)
  - E – Medium goods vehicle (e.g. truck)
  - F – Heavy passenger motor vehicle (e.g. bus)
  - G – Heavy goods vehicle (e.g. truck)
  - H – E-rickshaw
  - I – E-cart (cargo variant of E-rickshaw)
  - J – any other category not covered above
- '0123': Four digit unique number assigned to the holder of trade certificate e.g. vehicle dealer or manufacturer
- 'TC': Short for ‘Trade Certificate’
- '0001': Number of up to four digits to be assigned to one specific vehicle by holder of trade certificate, as allowed by registration authority

Example: LA01C0001TC0001 for a light motor vehicle (e.g. car) registered for trade in Kargil in Ladakh.

For old format, refer section Pre-2022 Trade Registration.

== HSRP: High security registration plate ==
On 1 June 2005, the Government of India had amended rule 50 of the Central Motor Vehicles Rules, 1989, mandating introduction of new tamper proof High Security Registration (HSRP) number plates. All new motorised road vehicles that came into the market after that needed to adhere to the new plates, while existing vehicles had been given two years to comply. Features incorporated include the number plate having a patented chromium hologram, a laser numbering containing the alpha-numeric identification of both the testing agency and manufacturers and a retro-reflective film bearing a verification inscription "India" at a 45-degree inclination. The characters are embossed on the plate for better visibility. The letters "IND" were printed in a light shade of blue on the observers left side under the hologram. However it has yet to be implemented since the various state Governments has not yet appointed an official source for manufacture of these plates, due to disputes which are currently in various Indian courts. On 8 April 2011 the Supreme Court of India summoned the transport secretaries of Delhi, Punjab and Uttar Pradesh for contempt of court proceedings regarding nonenforcement of the high-security registration plates. The Supreme Court on 30 November 2004, had clarified that all states had to comply with the scheme. Currently all of North East including Assam, Gujarat, Rajasthan, Jammu and Kashmir, West Bengal, Karnataka, Andaman & Nicobar Islands (UT) and Goa are the only states which have complied in full. The states of Bihar, Jharkhand, Uttar Pradesh, Madhya Pradesh, Chhattisgarh, Odisha and Maharashtra have not proceeded after having called tenders. Besides these states some of the other states have also taken action to implement the new scheme.

Haryana and Punjab has launched the High Security Registration Plates Scheme in the state. High Security Registration Plates have been made mandatory in for all new and old vehicles.

Maharashtra has announced to implement new number plates and deadline set on 31 March 2025.

== Historical registration plates ==
=== Historical colour coding ===
Following colour coding have been discontinued for different reasons:

Vehicle Category	Old colour scheme	Example	Officially Inactive since	Remarks
Commercial (except rental)	Black text White background	AN 01 A 0123	1 February 2002	Discontinued to better align with international standard
Private	White text Black background	AN 01 A 0123	1 July 2002	Discontinued to better align with international standard
Registered with Consulate	Black text Yellow background	199 CC 0123	23 June 2017	Discontinued to differentiate from new colour coding of commercial vehicles

In case of changes in 2002, due to large number of vehicles and therefore slow enforcement, old colour coding was in use well after the official discontinuation date.

=== Historical registration formats ===
==== Pre-1940 ====
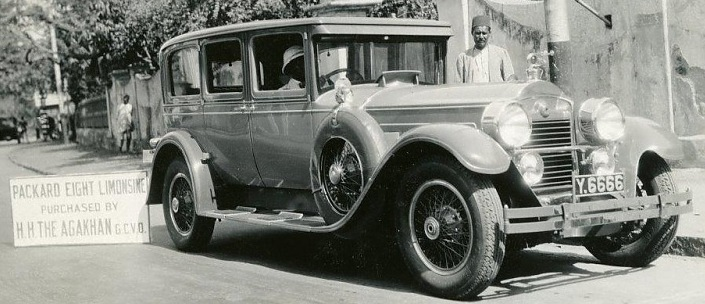
Vehicle with Bombay registration, circa 1928 with prefix 'Y'.

Before the introduction of Motor Vehicles Act, 1939 (enforced during 1940), a nationwide format did not exist. Initial vehicle registration format in country was simply a number of up to five digits. Gradually, a prefix of single or two letter(s) was introduced which was representative of province/city, and was followed by a number of (up to) four digits, e.g. K 1234 or FP 1234.

There were some exceptions as few places had already started to use three-letter prefix codes before 1940.

==== From 1940 till 1989 ====
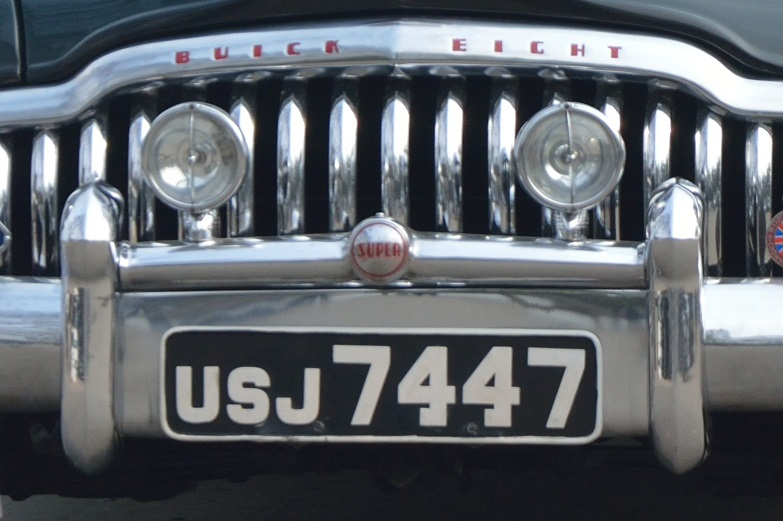
Vehicle registration plate with 1939 format. 'US' and 'J' corresponded to United Provinces and Lucknow respectively.

As part of the Motor Vehicles Act (1939), three-letter codes were introduced across many parts of the country and eventually became the official pan-India format. The format continued until the enforcement of Motor Vehicle Act of 1988 on 1 July, 1989.

'MV Act of 1939' Format
XYA 1234

Characters are representative of following:

- 'XY': Initial two letters identify the province or state. Multiple codes could be allocated to a state (concurrently or subsequently).
  - 'X': State/province had a designated and fixed first letter i.e. all codes of a state began with same letter. Letter was however not reserved to one state and could be shared. As an example, 'M' was designated first letter for erstwhile Madras Presidency and Mysore State, and later for states of Maharashtra, Madhya Pradesh, Manipur and Meghalaya as well.
Two-letter codes (XY) used by states and provinces:

First letter (X)	State	State code(s) (XY)
A	Andhra Pradesh	AA AB AI AP AT
A	Andhra State	AD
A	Ajmer State	AJ
A	Andaman & Nicobar Islands	AN
A	Assam	AS
B	Bombay Province / Bombay State	BM (Bombay city); BY (rest of state)
B	Bihar	BE BH BI BP BR
B	Maharashtra	BL (Bombay city); Exception to the rule of using consistent first letter (M)
C	Central Provinces	CP
C	Coorg State	CG
C	Chandigarh	CH
C	Karnataka	CA CK CM CN CR CT
D	Daman & Diu	DM
D	Delhi	DA DB DD DE DH DI DL DN
G	Goa / Goa, Daman and Diu	GD DM*; *Used for Daman & Diu districts
G	Gujarat	GA GB GC GJ GR
H	Haryana	HN
H	Hyderabad State	HD HT HY
J	Jammu & Kashmir	JK
K	Kerala	KL KR KE KB KC KD (in chronological order); Historical Kerala codes
K	Kutch State	KH
M	Madras State	MD MS
M	Mysore State	ME MY
M	Maharashtra	MA MF MG MH MJ MM MR MT MV MW MX MZ
M	Madhya Bharat / Madhya Pradesh	MB MP MO MK MI MU CP* *reusing code from predecessor Central Provinces
M	Meghalaya	ML
M	Manipur	MN
N	Nagaland	NL
O	Orrisa	OR
P	Punjab	PC PN PJ PU
P	Pondicherry	PY
R	Rajasthan	RJ RN RP RR RS
S	Saurashtra State	SS
T	Tamil Nadu	TA TC TD TL TM TN TS
T	Travancore / Travancore–Cochin	TC (until 1956)
T	Tripura	TR
U	United Provinces / Uttar Pradesh	UA UG UH UP UR US UT
V	Vindhya Pradesh	VP
W	West Bengal	WB WG WM WN WR
Z	Mizoram	ZR

- 'A': Third letter allotted to a specific district of given state/province. In some instances, letter could be reserved for specific category of vehicles, such as in Central Provinces where 'P' was reserved for the state-police vehicles. Certain states/UTs in India remained exceptions as they either didn't adopt the third letter, as in the case of Andaman & Nicobar Islands (AN), or they transitioned to three-letter code much later: Chandigarh (CH), Pondicherry (PY) and Jammu & Kashmir (JK).
- '1234': Unique number between 1 and 9999

By 1947 i.e. India's independence, the three-letter format was almost standard throughout the country, with the exception of the colonies which were not yet incorporated into India.

==== French and Portuguese colonies ====
French and Portuguese colonies in India used different registration formats until they were incorporated into independent India.

- French Colonies: Pondicherry used the following formats:
  - Until the de facto incorporation into India in 1954: Letter 'P' as prefix followed by a number of (up to) four digits, e.g. P 1234.
  - Post-incorporation: At some point prefix was changed to 'PY'.
- Portuguese Colonies: Goa used the following formats:
  - Until around 1957: Letter 'G' as prefix followed by a number of (up to) four digits, e.g. G 1234.
  - From 1957 until annexation by India in 1961: Three-letter prefix followed by a four digit number in style 'IGx–12–34', 'x' being the sequence letter i.e. A, B and so on.
  - Post-annexation: Vehicles were re-registered with Motor Vehicles Act (1939) format, with 'GDA' as the three-letter code.

==== Princely states ====
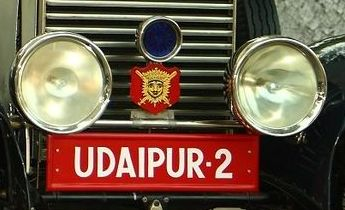
Vehicle registration plate from Udaipur State (aka Kingdom of Mewar)

Princely states had a different registration format compared to rest of the country until they acceded to independent India. Colour scheme used was white text on red background and the format was state's name followed by a number.

Princely State registration format
X 1234

'X' represents the name of state. Example: MYSORE 1, JODHPUR 5

==== Top constitutional authorities ====
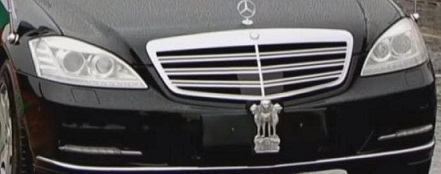
Emblem of India used on an old official car of Indian president

It used to be a general practice for offices of top constitutional authorities in India (i.e. President, Vice-president, Governors and lieutenant governors and the protocol division of the Ministry of External Affairs) to not register their official vehicles. Instead of registration plates, an embossed Emblem of India was used (sometimes in combination with a red plate). In 2018, above offices were instructed to have all their official vehicles registered as per applicable laws.

==== Pre-2022 trade registration ====
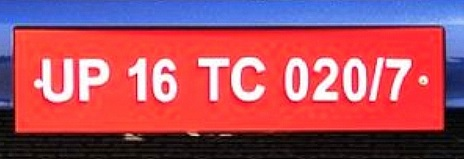
Vehicle registration plate with old trade number format of Uttar Pradesh, for a car registered in Noida.

Before the introduction of 2022 notification, the defined format for trade registration was more generic and only specified following:

Old trade registration format
AB 12 TC XXXX

- AB, 12 and TC : Same representation as in current format, detailed in Trade registration format
- XXXX: Format consisting of alphanumeric characters, as decided by respective state or Union Territory. Most states/UTs (at the time of introduction of new format in 2022) used the following scheme:
  - 123 456 where '123' is a number (of up to 3 digits) allocated to holder of trade certificate and '456' is a unique number (of up to 3 digits) assigned to a specific vehicle. Example: UP 16 TC 020 007

Trade numbers with old format can continue to be used as per validity period.
