= Gila MBPV =

- Type: Mine Ballistic Protected Vehicle
- Place of origin: South Africa

Specifications
- Mass: 12-13.6 tonnes
- Length: 6.39 metres (21.0 ft)
- Width: 2.5 metres (8.2 ft)
- Height: 2.75 metres (9.0 ft)
- Crew: 2 (commander and driver) + 9 (passengers)
- Main armament: light turret which can accommodate 7.62-mm, 12.7-mm machine guns, or 20-mm cannon.
- Secondary armament: rear roof-mounted gun ring for 7.62-mm machine gun or 40-mm automatic grenade launcher
- Engine: Daimler-Chrysler diesel Euro III; 215 hp (160 kW)
- Drive: 4×4-wheeled
- Operational range: 850 km
- Maximum speed: 105 kilometres per hour (65 mph) on road

The Gila MBPV is a mine protected vehicle from South Africa developed by private investors and manufactured by IVEMA and similar to the more popular Casspir. The vehicle was introduced in 2006 and production of the vehicle is at IVEMA facility in Midrand, South Africa.

It is four-wheeled and is being used for transport of troops. It can hold a crew of two, plus nine passengers.

== Operators ==
- United Nations: 24 units to United Nations/African Union forces (UNAMID) in Darfur, Sudan
- Burkina Faso: 6 supplied by Canada for Military Police of Burkina Faso
- Nigeria: private buyer and also for use as ambulance in Dafur

== Variants ==
- Gila APC
- Gila Armoured Ambulance
- Missile Carrier
- mortar carrier
- electronic warfare vehicle
- battlefield re-supply vehicle
- command post vehicle

== See also ==
- Buffalo (mine protected vehicle), a 6x6 originally built by Force Protection Inc
- Cougar (vehicle), a 4x4 originally built by Force Protection Inc
- Buffel, an early South African mine protected vehicle
- Oshkosh M-ATV, current generation lighter weight mine protected vehicle manufactured by Oshkosh Corporation
- Mahindra Mine Protected Vehicle, design inspired by the Casspir
- Casspir
