= Gila APC =

Gila PAC
- Type: Mine-Resistant Vehicle
- Place of origin: South Africa

Specifications
- Mass: 12-13.6 tonnes
- Length: 6.39 metres (21.0 ft)
- Width: 2.5 metres (8.2 ft)
- Height: 2.75 metres (9.0 ft)
- Crew: 2+9
- Main armament: light turret which can accommodate 7.62-mm, 12.7-mm machine guns, or 20-mm cannon.
- Secondary armament: rear roof-mounted gun ring for 7.62-mm machine gun or 40-mm automatic grenade launcher
- Engine: Daimler-Chrysler diesel 215 hp (160 kW)
- Drive: 4×4-wheeled
- Operational range: 850 km
- Maximum speed: 105 kilometres per hour (65 mph) on road

The Gila APC is a mine protected vehicle from South Africa developed by private investors and manufactured by IVEMA and similar to the more popular Casspir.

This four-wheeled vehicle is used for troop transport. It can hold a crew of two, plus nine passengers.

== Operators ==
- United Nations: UN Forces in Darfur
- Burkina Faso: Six supplied by Canada for Military Police of Burkina Faso

== Variants ==
- Gila APC
- Gila Armoured Ambulance
- Missile Carrier
- mortar carrier
- electronic warfare vehicle
- battlefield re-supply vehicle
- command post vehicle

== See also ==
- Buffalo (mine protected vehicle), a 6x6 originally built by Force Protection Inc
- Cougar (vehicle), a 4x4 originally built by Force Protection Inc
- Buffel, an early South African mine protected vehicle
- Oshkosh M-ATV, current generation lighter weight mine protected vehicle manufactured by Oshkosh Corporation
- Mahindra Mine Protected Vehicle, design inspired by the Casspir
- Casspir
