= Ordnance Factory Board Mine Protected Vehicle =

Light tactical military vehicle

Aditya Mine Protected Vehicle
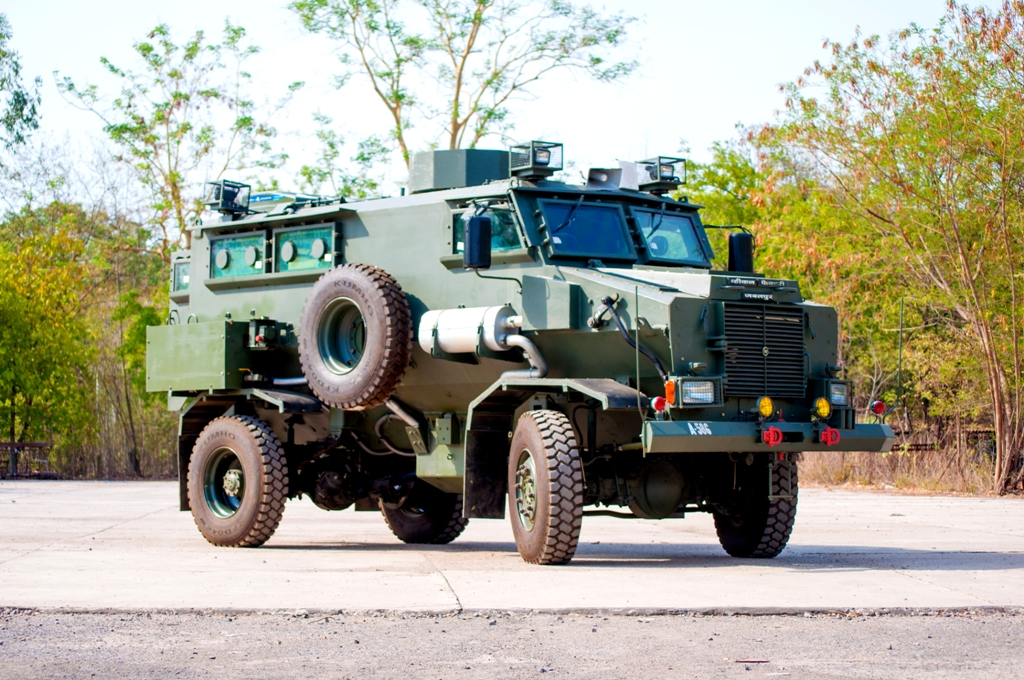
- An Aditya-type MPV.
- Type: Mine-Resistant Ambush Protected (MRAP)
- Place of origin: India

Service history
- Used by: Indian Army; Nepali Army; Myanmar Army
- Wars: Naxalite–Maoist insurgency Insurgency in Jammu and Kashmir; Nepalese Civil War

Production history
- Manufacturer: AVANI
- Produced: 2001 – present
- Variants: See Variants

Specifications
- Length: 6.00 metres
- Width: 2.90 metres
- Height: 3.07 metres
- Crew: 2 (Crew) + 10 (Passengers)
- Main armament: Turret for light/medium machine gun or a Remote weapon station mounted on top.
- Engine: Diesel
- Power/weight: 11 Tons at 1400 kg
- Ground clearance: 305 mm (ground); 1000 mm (fording)
- Operational range: 1,000 km (621 mi)

The Aditya Mine Protected Vehicle (OFB MPV) is a Mine-Resistant Ambush Protected-type vehicle used by the Indian Army and the Central Reserve Police Force as an armored personnel carrier to transport personnel with protection from explosives and small arms fire. The MPV's construction was based on the Casspir Mk II, which India used in the 1990s.

The Mine Protected Vehicle has been improved by Ordnance Factory Board after feedback from the CRPF based on their experience in encountering powerful improvised explosive devices that were able to destroy them and kill the occupants inside during ambushes.

As of 2018, 12 MPVs were lost to IED ambushes.

== History ==
The Mine Protected Vehicle was developed in 2001 at a cost of US$14 million. In 2004, exports were made to Nepal. Sainik Samachar reported in the July 2005 issue that OFB had made a version of the MPV with a remote control weapon system.

The MPV was presented publicly in 2007, with the name of Aditya, under the production of Ordnance Factory Medak. The Indian Army made a contract to secure 1,400 MPVs, but an order of 250 MPVs was secured in November 2007.

For a short time, there were discreet inquiries made by the US military on the option of purchasing OFB-made MPVs.

However following a series of ambushes conducted with improvised explosive devices (IEDs) that were able to destroy the MPVs as early as 2005, they were described by CRPF director general K. Vijay Kumar as merely “coffins on wheels”.

The reasoning was simple, the Naxalites were able to produce IEDs containing up to 80 kilograms explosives in weight and no MRAP can be designed to survive the blast force generated by such a massive explosion due to IEDs and not against anti-tank mines.

Hence, the MRAPs were converted to use in limited roles, such as evacuating casualties.

This also forced the CRPF to look for alternative means to successfully counter IED ambushes. The CRPF has discontinued most of its MPVs in service in 2012.

In the meantime, their MPVs were sent to Kashmir for use in providing security to CRPF convoys there, since the insurgents operating in the region and in Naxal-influenced areas have different operational methods. CRPF MPVs in Naxalite areas are limited to evacuating casualties.

In 2012, the CRPF approached OFB specialists from Vehicle Factory Jabalpur and requested for future MPVs to be enhanced for better protection against IEDs.

In response, OFB made an upgraded version of the first MPV, known as the Modern Mine Protected Vehicle or the Yuktirath, which was ordered by the Indian Army with an initial order of 14 MPVs in 2009. The Yukitirath was officially presented for the first time in public in 2012 at the Defexpo 2012 exhibition. The Indian Army made an order for 250 MPVs in late September 2016, which is expected to be produced by Vehicle Factory Jabalpur with first deliveries made in 2018. They will be deployed in the Northeastern parts of India and in Kashmir for anti-insurgency operations.

Ordnance Factory Board Medak won the Golden Peacock Innovative Product Award during a ceremony in Dubai in 2016 for excellence in their technology in creating and improving the MPV.

On September 5, 2022, India gave 10 MPVs as part of a military grant worth Rs 222 million (US$4.25 Million, adjusted for 2024).

== Design ==
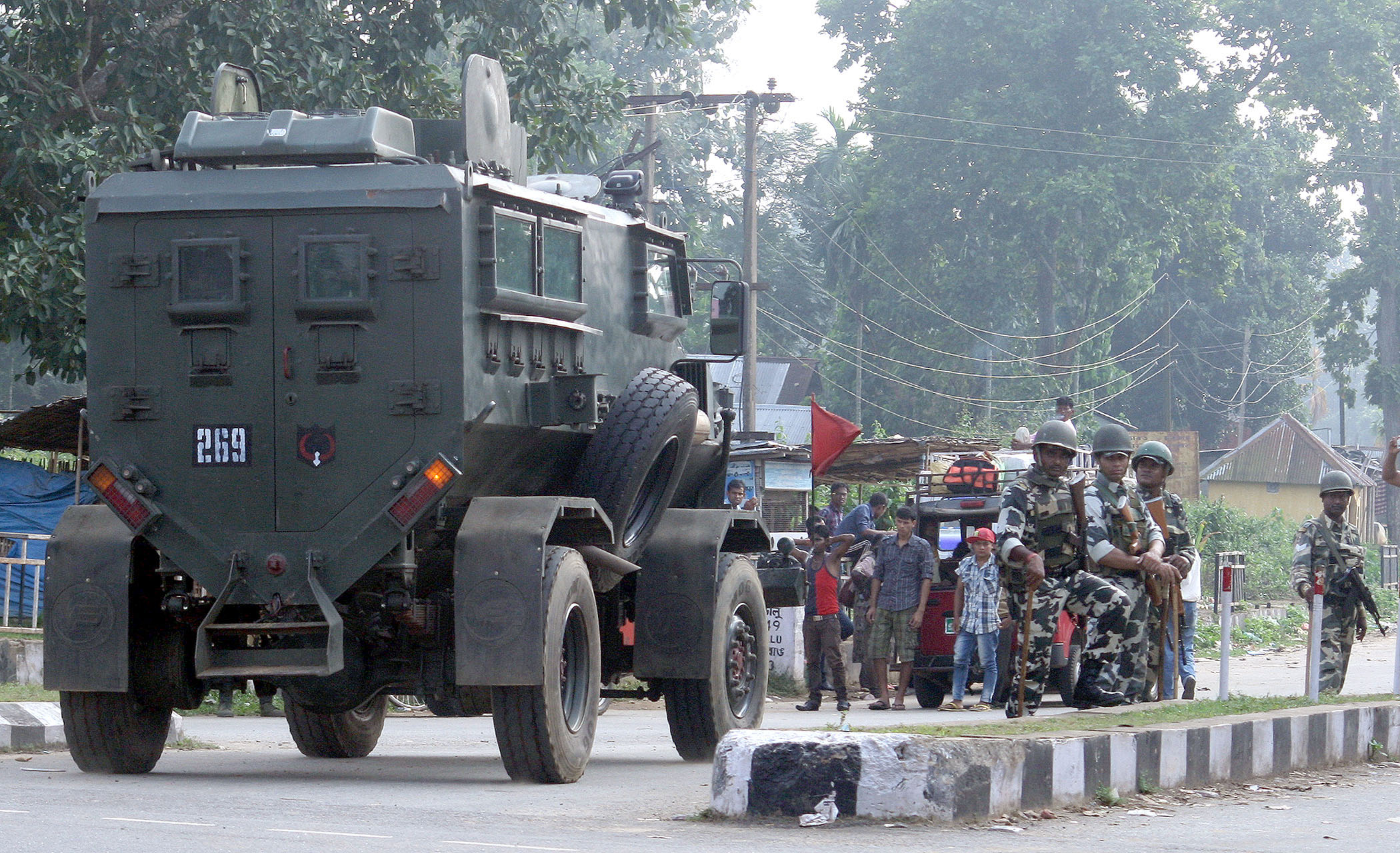
Rear view of the Aditya MPV.

Being based on the Casspir, the MPV has the same V-monoque hull with a provision for a Remote weapon station or a mounted turret for a light or medium machine gun for protection and self-defense purposes. The RWS can be armed with machine guns or grenade launchers.

Its use was criticized by the CRPF due to bad armor protection, which means that stronger IEDs can be used to destroy them when they are out on patrols. Naxalite-made IEDs are composed of fertilisers, gelatins, emulsions and slurries. Their successes in destroying them serves as mainly propaganda for the Naxalites.

The creation of the Yuktirath has better protection than its predecessor, surviving 14 kg of explosives and 1 kg of shrapnel from 5 metres with a height of 1.5 metres, which also includes better axles to be easily replaced in case it gets damaged in an IED ambush. It can also withstand TNT and other types of explosives for up to 42 kg under the wheel and 35 kg under the hull with a 6x6 drivetrain.

The Minister of State for Defence M. M. Pallam Raju mentioned the need for technology to be modernized with the creation of the Yuktirath.

=== Tests ===
In tests against the Wer’wolf MKII, the Indian Army said that the MPV failed in most of the tests conducted, such as driving on steep terrain with occasional breakdowns, leaks and broken parts. During simulated IED bomb tests, the MPV failed since it destroyed the windows and the floor plates with the rear axles and hull having major damage. At one point, the MPV crew refused to participate in driving the vehicle in the snow as part of the snow test, not trusting its worthiness.

== Variants ==
- Aditya – (Literally Sun in Sanskrit) First version of the MPV. It was made in 2001, but was publicly announced in 2007. It's built to withstand TNT and other types of explosives for up to 14 kg under the wheel and 10 kg under the hull.
- Yuktirath – Second version of the MPV. It's built to withstand bomb attacks from TNT and other types of explosives for up to 42 kg under the wheel and 35 kg, alongside 14 kg of explosives and 1 kg of shrapnel from 5 metres with a height of 1.5 metres under the hull with a 6×6 drivetrain. The other known variant aside from the MRAP version is a light armored recovery vehicle, which has a 4x4 drivetrain.

== Operators ==
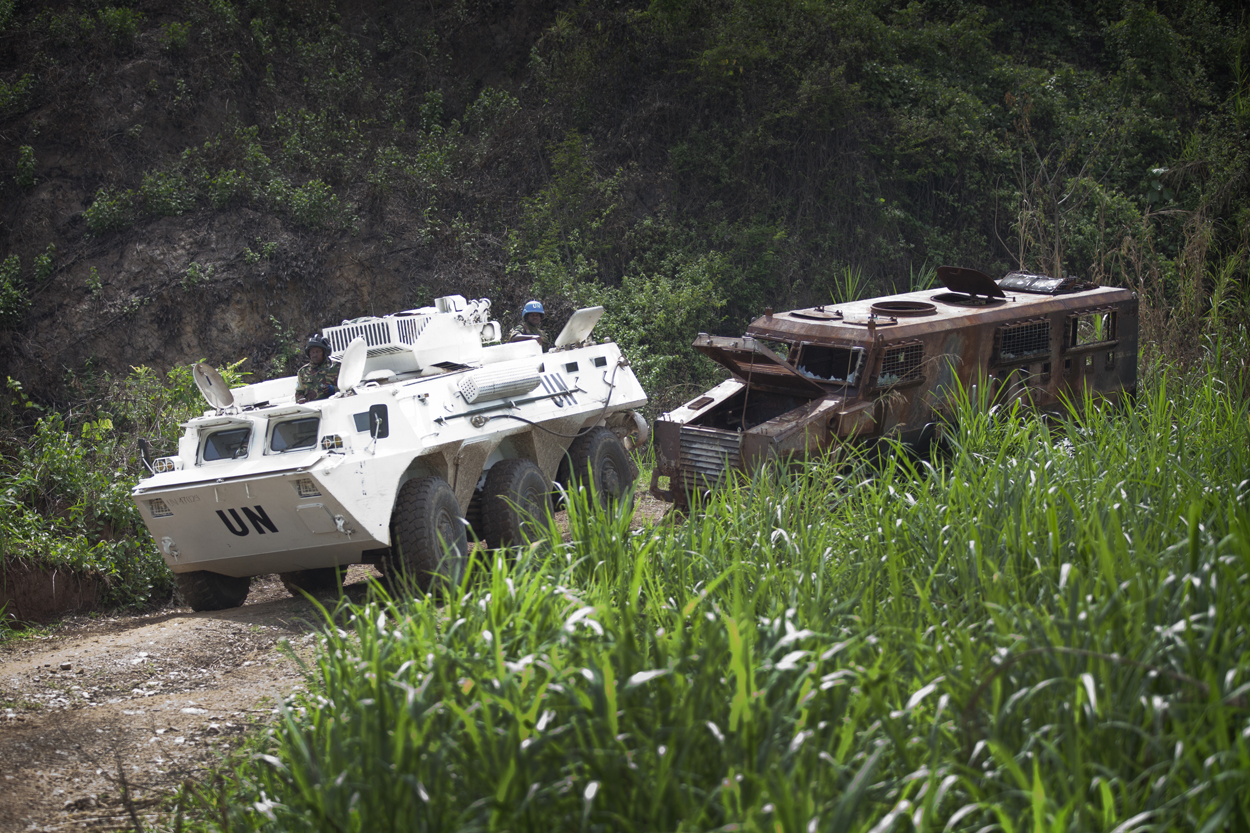
March 2014, a Tanzanian WZ551 passing by the wreck of a Nepalese MVP, destroyed one year earlier during MONUSCO operations against the ADF in the Democratic Republic of the Congo.

=== Current operators ===
- India: Sold to the Indian Army and various paramilitary forces. 266 Aditya-type MPVs sold to the Indian Army and 120 for paramilitary forces in 2006. 250 MPVs sold in 2007. 14 Yuktirath-type MPVs sold with 329 ordered in 2009 with 250 MPVs purchased in 2016.
- Myanmar: unknown numbers of MPVs provided by India in 2006 for use against Assamese militants operating from Myanmar, currently unknown if operational.
- Nepal: Sold to the Nepalese Army, being used in anti-insurgency operations against Maoist guerrillas during the civil war. 65 MPVs, followed by 30 MPVs were sold in 2004. 25 were subsequently sold. 124 MPVs used, most of them purchased due to Indian military grants. 10 MPVs handed over from India.

=== Failed exports ===
- Iraq: Won a contract to produce 300 MPVs for the Iraqi Army with a cost of Rs.1.5 Billion (US$28.81 Million, adjusted for 2024) at Rs.5 Million (US$93.000, adjusted for 2024) per vehicle. Due to undisclosed reasons from the MEA and MOD, OFB was forced to call off the production.

== Bibliography ==
- Camp, Steve; Heitman, Helmoed Römer (2014). Surviving the Ride: A Pictorial History of South African-Manufactured Mine-Protected Vehicles. 30 Degrees South Publishers. ISBN 978-1928211174.
