= Gilla Asalta =

Irish historian

Gilla Asalta (died 1172) was an Irish historian.

Gilla Asalta appears to be solely known via an obituary in the Annals of Tigernach under the year 1172, which states:

- Gilla Asalta, senchaidh Ruaidhrí Uí Concobair ríg Erenn, ard-shái na n-Gaidhel ina aimsir, mortuus est/Gilla Asalta, chief historian of Ruaidrí Ua Conchobair king of Ireland, the chief sage of the Gaels in his time, died.
