= Defence Land Systems India Limited =

Indian company making military vehicles

Defense Land Systems India
- Company type: Private
- Industry: Defense
- Founded: 2010
- Defunct: 2013
- Headquarters: New Delhi, India
- Area served: India
- Parent: Mahindra & Mahindra; BAE Systems

Defence Land Systems India Limited (DLSI) was a joint venture between Mahindra & Mahindra Limited and BAE Systems. It designs and produces light armoured vehicles, specialist military vehicles, mine protected vehicles, artillery systems and other land weapons systems and vehicles. The company has production facilities in Prithla, Haryana.

The partnership ended in 2013.

== Products and services ==
In 2010, DLSI launched the Mine Protected Vehicle India, an armored vehicle especially designed for anti-terrorism and anti-Naxal operations. It offers ballistic and land mine protection to troops and paramilitary forces in rugged terrain. With capacity to carry 18 troops with full gear, the vehicle can withstand blasts of up to 21 kg equivalent of TNT under any wheel and 14 kg equivalent of TNT directly underneath the crew compartment. It features a V-shaped, steel monocoque hull which directs the force of the blast away from the occupants.
