= Gila (given name) =

Gila is a feminine given name which is borne by:

- Gila Almagor (born 1939), Israeli actress
- Gila Finkelstein (born 1950), Israeli former politician
- Gila Flam (born 1956), Israeli musicologist, ethnomusicologist, and a librarian, a researcher of Jewish music
- Gila Gamliel (born 1974), Israeli politician
- Gila Golan (born 1940), Polish-born actress who immigrated to Israel in the 1950s
- Gila Goldstein (1947–2017), Israeli actress, singer and transgender rights activist
- Gila Hanna, Canadian mathematics educator and philosopher of mathematics
- Gila Katsav (born 1948), Israel's first lady (2000–2007)
- Gila Martow (born 1961), Canadian politician
- Gila von Weitershausen (born 1944), German actress
