= Mahindra Mine Protected Vehicle =

MPV-I
- Type: Mine-Resistant Ambush Protected Vehicle
- Place of origin: India

Service history
- In service: 2010 - Present

Production history
- Manufacturer: Defense Land Systems India Limited

Specifications
- Passengers: 18
- Armor: Monocoque steel V-hull
- Main armament: None
- Engine: Diesel; 230 hp

The Mahindra Mine Protected Vehicle-I (MPV-I), is an Indian Mine-Resistant Ambush Protected Vehicle manufactured by Defense Land Systems, a joint-venture of Mahindra & Mahindra Limited and BAE Systems, the first vehicle made under the venture. It is an improved Casspir variant built under licence.

== Design ==
The MPV debuted in 2010, with the design aimed at protection of Indian security forces conducting anti-terrorism and anti-Naxalite operations in India's rugged forested and hilly terrains. It is powered by a ruggedized 230 HP diesel engine, paired with a 6x6 transmission.

The MPV offers armored protection to its crew and passengers against ballistic and land mine threats. It uses a V-shaped hull of steel and monocoque construction to direct the force of the blast away from the occupants under a Ural truck chassis. It has been tested to protect against 7.62×51mm NATO, 7.62×39mm Soviet and 5.56×45mm NATO rounds from a 10m distance. It can withstand 21 kg of TNT equivalent explosions directly under any wheel, and 14 kg of TNT equivalent explosions directly under the crew compartment.

It can carry up to 18 security and paramilitary personnel with full equipment including the crew.

The MPV can be armed with a remote controlled weapon station for basic armaments purposes.

== Operational history ==
In August 2011, the first production series vehicles were delivered to Jharkhand Police.

In October 2011, the CRPF reported that it had reduced the use of MPVs in operations against Naxalites, since some of the improvised explosive devices were of up to 80 kg, far above the 21 kg limit that the vehicles were designed to withstand due to IEDs and not against anti-tank mines. They were only used in limited roles, such as evacuating casualties.

In early 2015, Myanmar Army received 10 MPV-1s with 10 Aditya MRAP as military aid from India in 2006 for use against Assamese rebels operating from Myanmar.

== Users ==
- Cambodia: Used by Cambodia in peacekeeping operations.
- Mozambique: Reported to be in use by Mozambique Police.

== See also ==
- Casspir

== Bibliography ==
- Camp, Steve; Heitman, Helmoed Römer (2014). Surviving the Ride: A Pictorial History of South African-Manufactured Mine-Protected Vehicles. 30 Degrees South Publishers. ISBN 978-1928211174.
