= Gila Preparatory Academy =

Coordinates: 32.8380°N 109.7317°W

Location
- 1976 Thatcher Blvd. Safford, Arizona 85546; United States

Information
- School type: Public charter/alternative high school
- Opened: 2000
- Closed: 2011
- Principal: Crea Wilson
- Grades: 7–12
- Enrollment: Approx. 80 students (final year)
- Colors: Purple and silver
- Mascot: Mustangs

Gila Preparatory Academy was a high school in Safford, Arizona. It was run by a company known as the Gila Educational Group, of which the head was Crae Wilson, Jr. It formerly also had a middle school, which served grades 7 and 8. It opened in 2000 as Pathways to College.

The Arizona Department of Education with the Arizona State Board for Charter Schools, which manages charter schools like Gila Preparatory Academy, could have revoked Gila Educational Group's charter for the middle school and high school because the middle school had not met standards on the Arizona's Instrument to Measure Standards statewide exam and granted "alternative school" (at-risk school) status to the schools. In a settlement, the Gila Educational Group agreed to close the middle school effective 30 June 2010 and to stop serving students in grades 7 and 8; it also agreed to create a performance improvement plan with the ADE to improve AIMS scores that extended through June 2013.

Continued decreases in state funding forced the high school to close after the 2010–11 school year and its assets to be sold off to meet its financial obligations. Gila Prep's ten staffers lost their jobs.
