= Casspir =

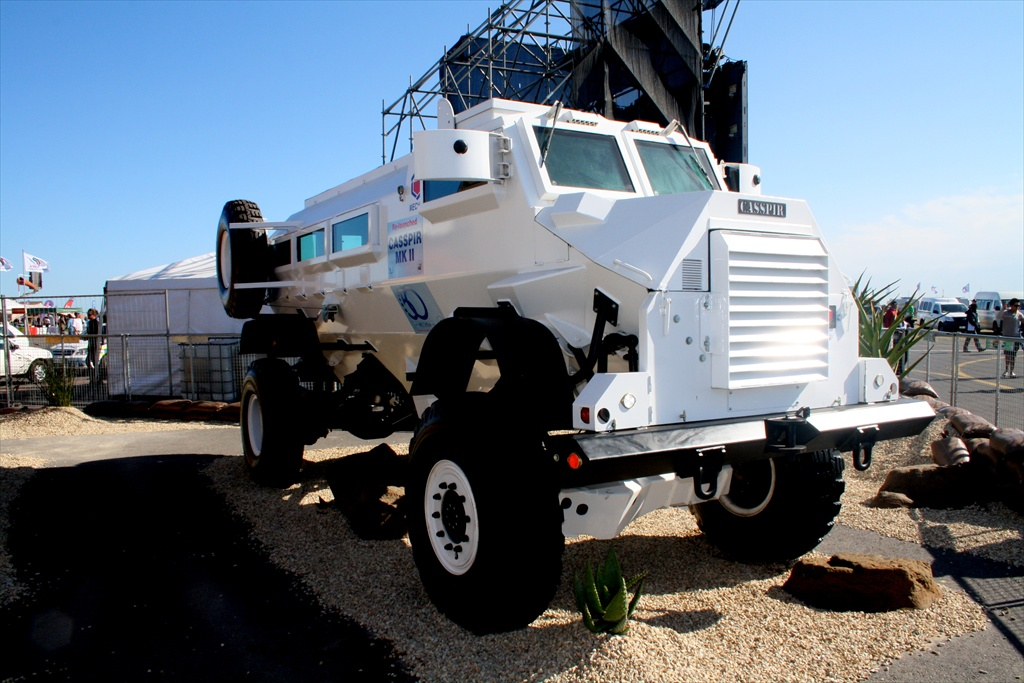
- A Casspir Mk II on display in 2010
- Type: Mine-Resistant Ambush Protected Vehicle
- Place of origin: South Africa

Specifications
- Mass: 10.88 t
- Length: 6.9 m (22.64 ft)
- Width: 2.45 m (8.04 ft)
- Height: 2.85 m (9.35 ft)
- Crew: 2+12
- Main armament: Various: 3 × 7.62 mm MG or 20 mm cannon
- Secondary armament: 12 firing ports
- Engine: Atlantis Diesel Engines OM352A turbo-charged diesel 124 kW
- Suspension: 4×4-wheeled
- Operational range: 770 km
- Maximum speed: 98 km/h on road 70 km/h off-road

The Casspir is a Mine-Resistant Ambush Protected Vehicle that has been in use in South Africa since the 1980s. It is a four-wheeled, four-wheel drive vehicle, used for transport of troops. It can hold a crew of two, plus 12 additional soldiers and associated equipment. The Casspir was unique in design when launched, providing for passive mine defence. The main armoured steel body of the vehicle is raised high above the ground, so when a mine is detonated, the explosion is less likely to damage the crew compartment and kill the occupants. The cross-section of the hull is V-shaped, directing the force of the explosion outwards, further protecting the occupants, it is considered to have been the father of the MRAP vehicle concept being the first of its kind.

The vehicle also offers crew protection from small arms fire. The capabilities of the Casspir were the basis of the outline capabilities required by the U.S. Marines for their MRAP program.

== Design history ==
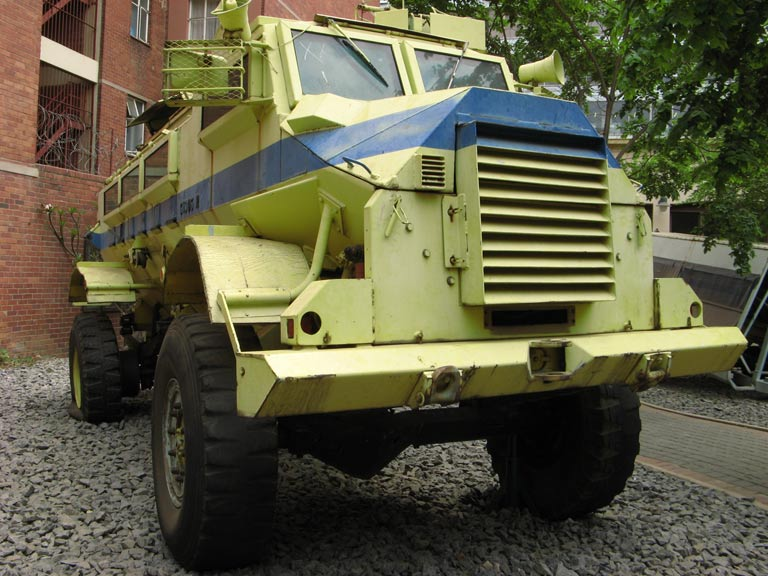
A Casspir at the South African Police Museum, Pretoria

The name 'Casspir' is an anagram of the abbreviations of the customer, the South African Police, and the design authority, the Council for Scientific and Industrial Research (CSIR – Applied Chemistry Unit that later became MECHEM). Although the Casspir was deployed in townships during the apartheid era, it was initially designed specifically for conditions encountered in the South African Border War.

It was at first extensively used by the infamous "Koevoet" police counterinsurgency unit in northern Namibia during the apartheid era and later also by the South-West Africa Territorial Force's 101 Battalion and the SA Army's 5 Reconnaissance Regiment. The chief criteria for the design was good off-road mobility, armour protection against small arms fire and anti-personnel mines, and ease and speed of repair by a light workshop crew in the field after detonating an anti-tank mine. These requirements led to the distinctive V-shaped hull (for mine protection) and a wheeled chassis.

The Casspir was designed by the Defence Research Unit (DRU) of CSIR specifically to protect vehicle occupants against landmines. It is certified to protect its occupants against a triple TM-57 mine blast (equivalent to 21 kg of TNT) under a wheel, or a double blast (14 kg of TNT) under the hull. The Casspir has a V-bottomed armoured monocoque hull, designed to deflect the force of an explosion outwards, to which a leaf-spring suspension is attached.

== Production history ==
After two years of field testing, the South African Police were eventually satisfied they had a good vehicle and in March 1980 placed an order for an initial 140 Casspirs. Some 190 Mk1 Casspirs were manufactured by Henred Fruehauf. In 1981 production was taken over by TFM, which improved the design to the Mk 2. TFM was subsequently taken over by Reumech OMC. Reumech in turn was taken over by Vickers Defence Systems of the UK and renamed Vickers OMC. When Alvis purchased Vickers Defence Systems to become Alvis Vickers, Vickers OMC became Alvis OMC. In 2004 BAE Systems acquired Alvis Vickers and Alvis OMC was renamed Land Systems OMC. Land Systems OMC was 75 per cent acquired by Denel in 2015. An estimated 2800 Casspirs of all types have been built. In 2018 the ADE 352 engines, gearboxes, shock absorbers, differentials and other parts are still being supplied by ADE (Atlantis Diesel Engineering) in South Africa as well as the later model Casspir NG2000.

The South African Police Service sold some of their surplus Casspirs to the public at a 2008 auction. A new Casspir known as Casspir NG 2000 is being manufactured by Denel Mechem. The vehicle was launched in April 2013.

== Variants ==
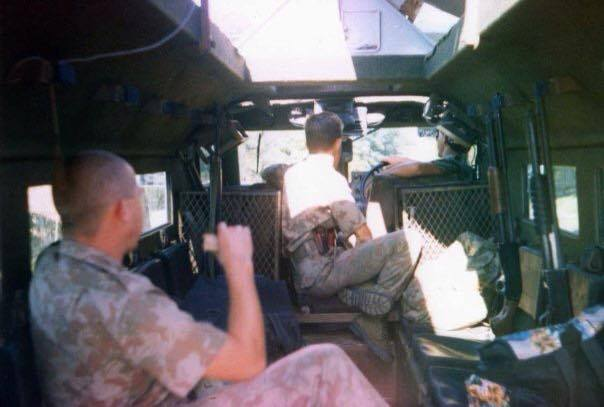
Crew compartment of a South African Police Casspir. Note the weapons storage.

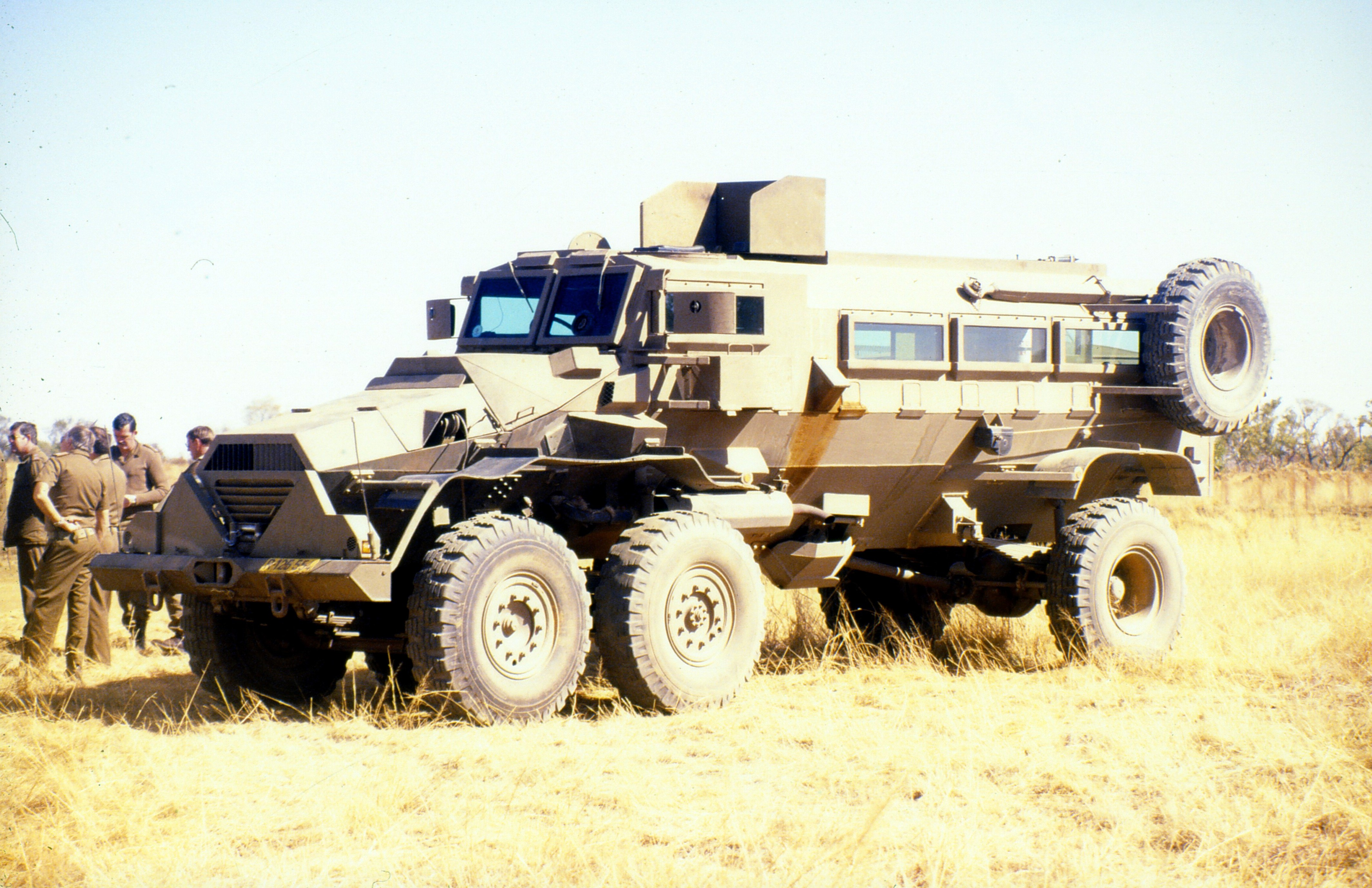
Sesspir prototype undergoing field tests

- Casspir Mk 1. It made extensive use of Mercedes-Benz truck components. First use in combat: Koevoet, South West African Police
- Casspir Mk 2 First user: 101 Battalion, South West African Territorial Force
- Casspir Mk 2C (I)
- Casspir Mk 3 – 170 hp (127 kW) ADE-352T 6-cylinder turbo-diesel
- Casspir 2000 & NG2000A (Mercedes Benz based)
- Casspir 2000B (Powerstar – North Benz based)
- Casspir 2000C (SINO Truck Military based)

The Casspir was built in different configurations:

- APC – armoured personnel carrier
- Artillery Fire Control vehicle
- Ambulance
- Blesbok Freighter – with drop side cargo area for up to 5 tons (160 built). Can be used as a weapon platform.
- Duiker Tanker – 5000 litre tank (30 built); originally with 3000 litre tank
- FISTV – Fire Support Team vehicle
- Gemsbok Recovery vehicle – 15-ton capacity (30 built)
- Mechem Mine clearing vehicle – uses steel wheels to detonate mines
- MEDDS (Mechem Explosives and Drug Detection System) Mine Sensor vehicle
- Mechem VAMMIDS (Vehicular Array Mine Detection System) Vehicle
- Plofadder Mine clearing System – carrier of the containerised Plofadder 160AT rocket-propelled mine clearing system
- Riot Control vehicle – Police version with larger windows to increase visibility
- Mechem LP (Low-Profile) and short-wheelbase vehicle
- Casspir Dumpy – A shortened version (1 m shorter) developed and purchased by the SA Army in 1982 to be evaluated against the requirements for the Buffel replacement project. Did not enter production
- Sesspir – In 1984–85 the CSIR developed a prototype Casspir with six wheels. An additional non-driven axle was fitted in front of the front drive axle, this to be sacrificed in the event of a landmine detonation. It steered along with the regular driven front wheels and was equipped with winch cables to hoist either side of the axle clear off the ground in the event of the loss of a wheel. The theory being the vehicle would remain mobile. The idea was shelved as one of numerous problems was simply a lack of power from the engine to push the undriven axle along through bush and soft sand. Only one prototype was built.
- Casspir NG Series or Casspir 2000 is known as the new generation hence Casspir NG 2000. Available in various models 2000, 2000A; 2000B; 2000C and a possible D model, all to house various drive trains. The NG design allow a common hull to fit various drive trains and either manual or automatic drive. The latest in the NG series is a design that is based on a monocoque design and chassis cab design, specific in the support variants. The NG2000 Series currently offer the following variants.
  - Casspir NG Troop Carrier – specific Military application
  - Casspir NG Personnel Carrier – specific for Humanitarian purposes
  - Casspir NG Security/Police special variant
  - Casspir NG Wide Body Command and Control special variant
  - Casspir NG Wide Body Ambulance special variant
  - Casspir NG Wide Body Reconnaissance special variant
  - Casspir NG Wide Body Weapons Platform Carrier special variant- to be suitable for Indirect Mortar; Anti-Tank or Anti-Aircraft
  - Casspir NG Wide Body Cargo special variant
  - Casspir NG Wide Body Fuel Carrier special variant
  - Casspir NG Wide Body Water Carrier special variant
  - Casspir NG Wide Body Recovery Light special variant
  - Casspir NG Wide Body Recovery Heavy special variant (6x6) "Eland"
  - Casspir NG Wide Body Art Light Gun Tractor special variant (6x6)
  - Casspir NG Chassis Cab Cargo special variant (4x4 & 6x6) – "Likkewaan"
  - Casspir NG Chassis Cab Water Carrier special variant (4x4 & 6x6) – "Likkewaan"
  - Casspir NG Chassis Cab Fuel Carrier special variant (4x4 & 6x6) – "Likkewaan"
  - Casspir NG Chassis Cab Hooklift special variant (6x6) – "Likkewaan"
  - Casspir NG Chassis Cab Art Gun Tractor special variant (6x6) – "Likkewaan"
  - Casspir NG Chassis Cab Tipper Truck special variant (6x4 & 6x6) – "Likkewaan"
  - Casspir NG Chassis Cab Truck Tractor special variant (6x4 & 6x6) – "Likkewaan"
  - Casspir NG Chassis Cab Recovery special variant Light, Medium and Heavy (4x4, 6x6 & 8x8) – "Likkewaan"

== Operators ==
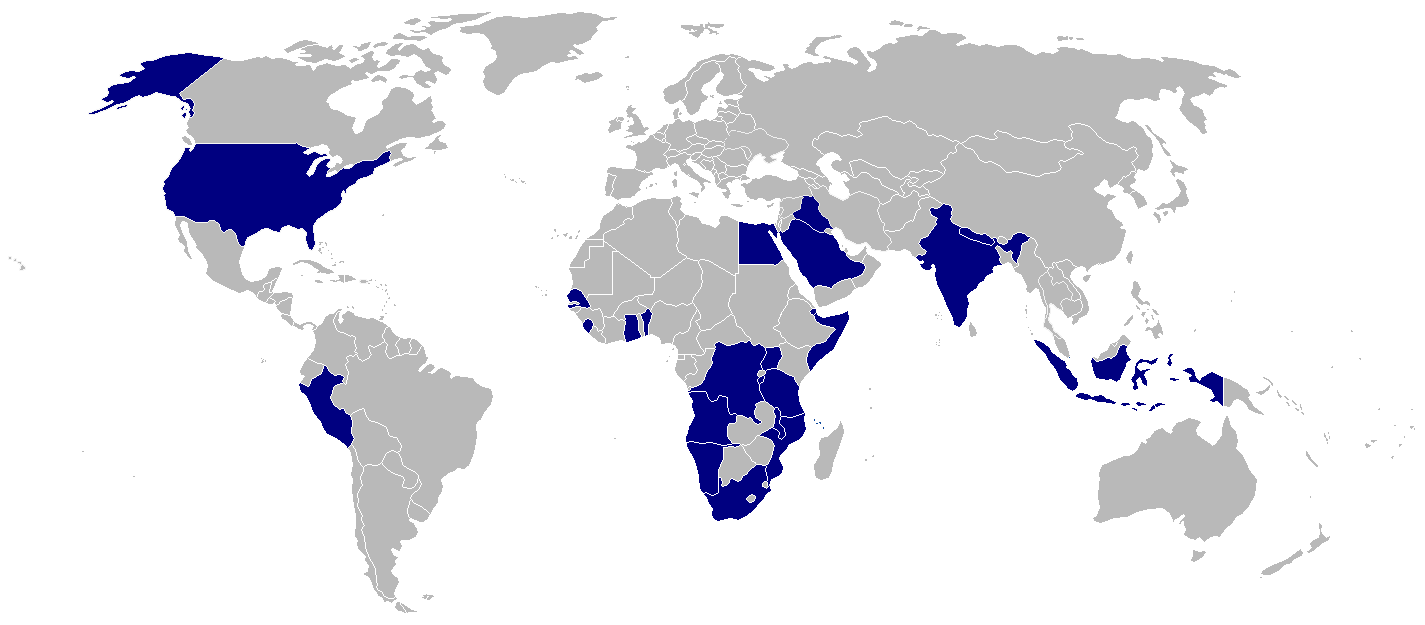
Casspir operators, past and present

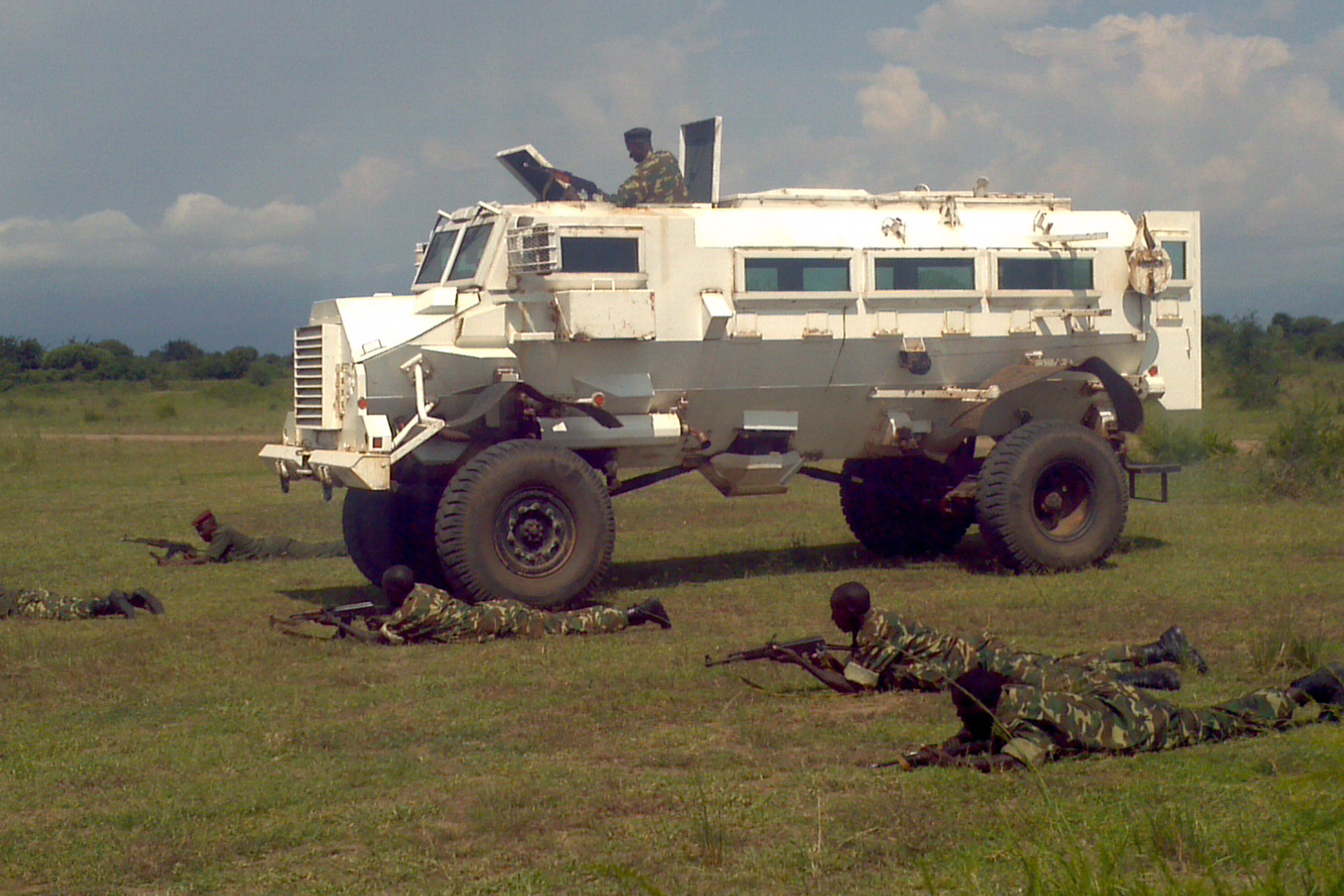
Burundi National Defence soldiers demonstrate squad movements with a Casspir during a mechanized infantry course

- Angola: 61
- Benin: 10
- Burundi: 10
- Democratic Republic of the Congo
- Djibouti: 3
- Egypt
- Ghana: 4
- India: 200+ used by Indian Army and other paramilitary forces
- Indonesia: 2 Casspir. Used by Kopassus
- Iraq
- Malawi: 12
- Mali: 29
- Mozambique: 15
- Namibia: 20 inherited from the South West African Territorial Force.
- Nepal: 37
- Pakistan: 150
- Peru: 20 Policía Nacional del Peru (DIROES)
- Saudi Arabia: 9
- Senegal: 9
- Sierra Leone: 3
- Somalia: 9
- South Africa: 370 in South African Army service.
- Tanzania: 5
- Uganda: 42
- United States: 68

== Combat history ==
- South African Border War
- Angolan Civil War
- Insurgency in Jammu and Kashmir
- Second Congo War
- Caprivi conflict
- Iraq War
- African Union Mission to Somalia

== Popular culture ==
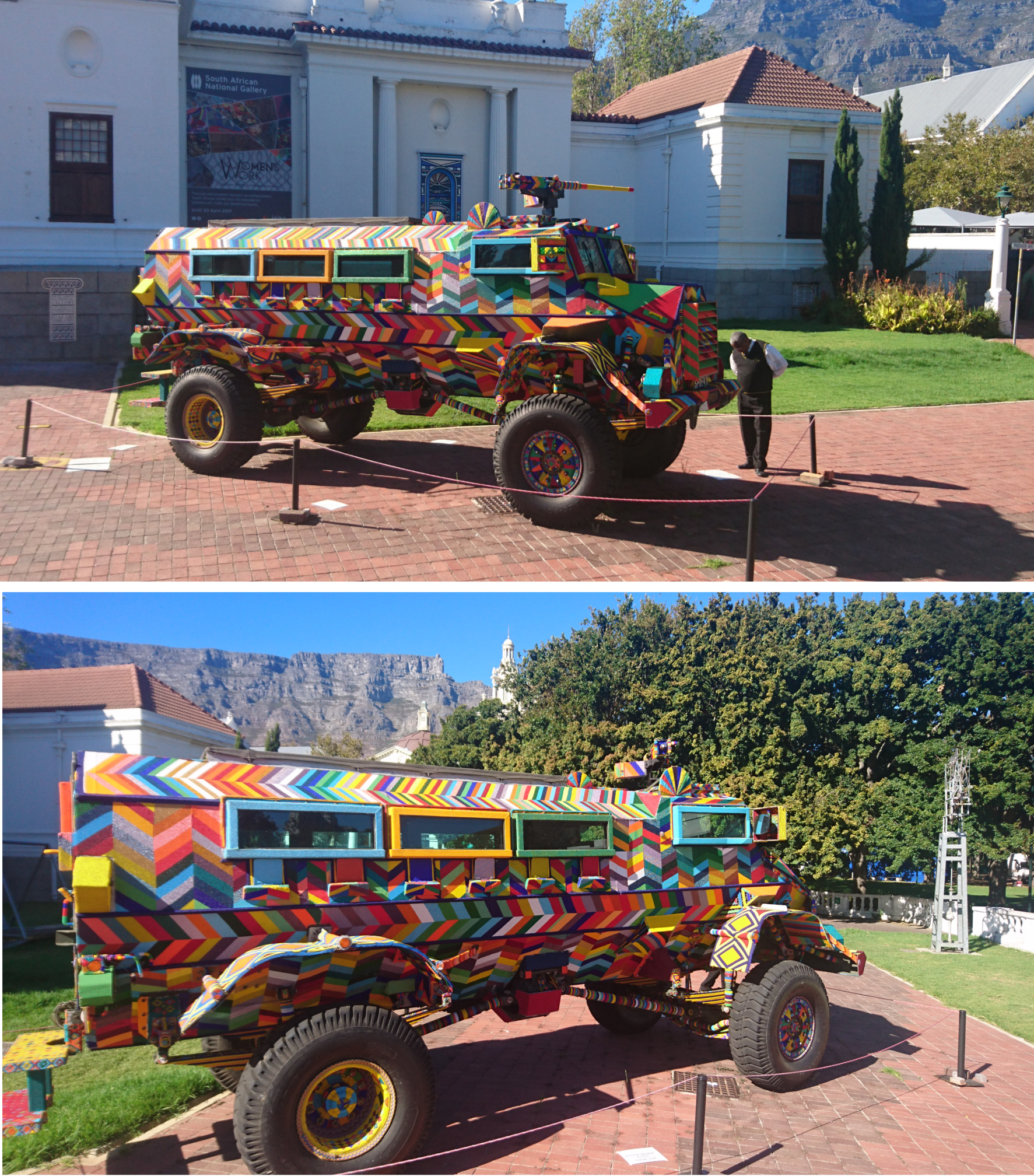
A Casspir armoured vehicle, covered in tens of millions of glass beads by artist Ralph Ziman, outside the Iziko South African Museum in Cape Town

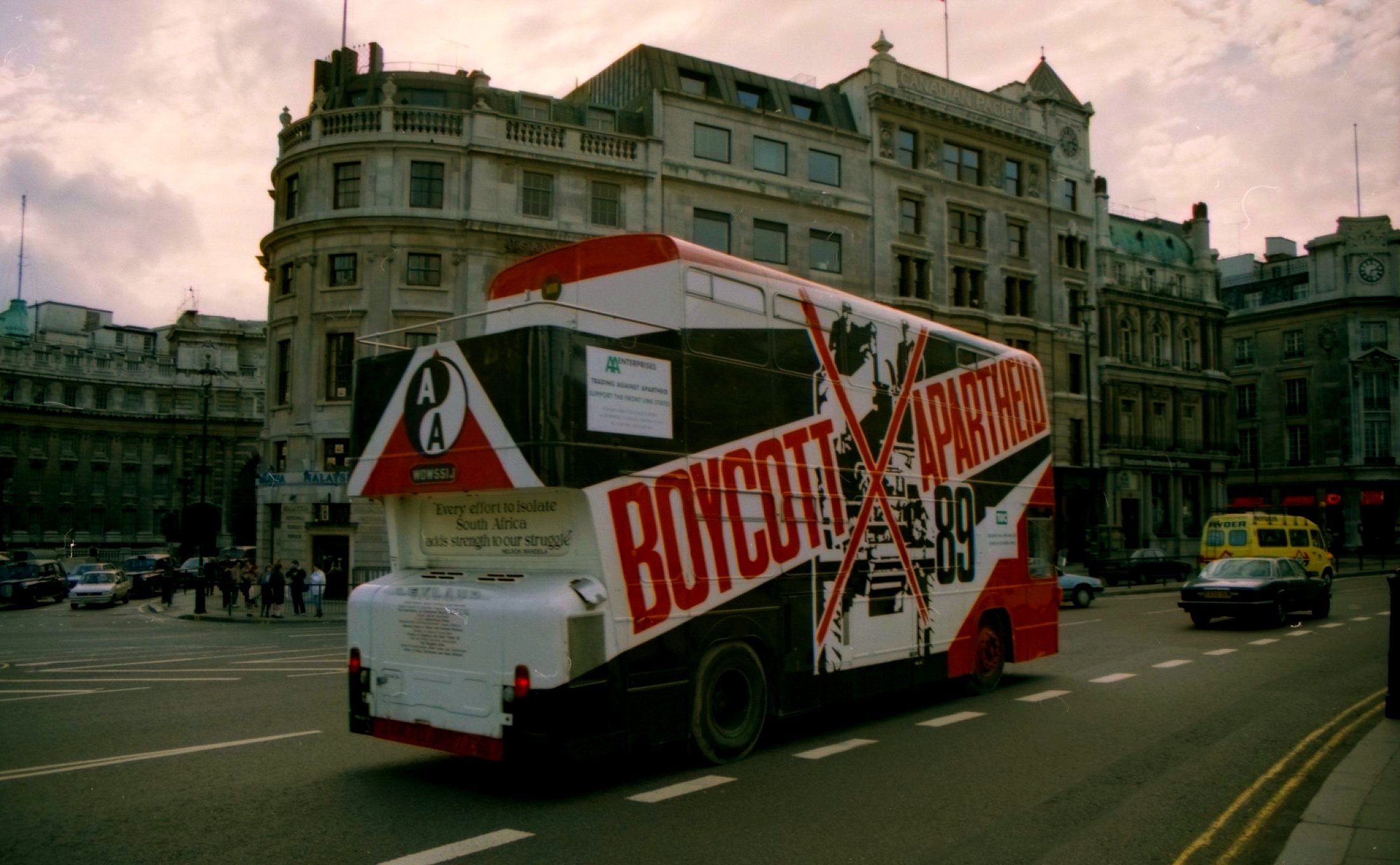
A London bus in 1989 carrying the "Boycott Apartheid" message. An image of a Casspir is crossed out symbolising the rejection of apartheid.

The Casspir has entered South African popular culture as an icon of apartheid-era state repression and is controversial for its continued deployment in South Africa for policing tasks. A beadwork Casspir, with Ndebele designs, outside the Iziko South African National Gallery was installed as a representation of this iconography of the vehicle. Created by interdisciplinary contemporary artist Ralph Ziman, the artwork is titled SPOEK 1.

A Casspir also forms part of the South Africa Apartheid Museum's exhibit on repression in the townships in the 1980s.

Casspirs were extensively used by the human characters to enter into the alien settlement zone in the 2009 movie District 9.

A Casspir is seen in the music video for the song "Dirty Harry" by Gorillaz.

== See also ==
- Buffalo (mine protected vehicle), a 6x6 originally built by Force Protection Inc
- Cougar (MRAP), a 4x4 originally built by Force Protection Inc
- Buffel, an early South African mine protected vehicle
- Wer'wolf MKII, a 4x4 Namibian Mine Protected Vehicle
- Oshkosh M-ATV, current generation lighter weight mine protected vehicle manufactured by Oshkosh Corporation
- Mahindra Mine Protected Vehicle, design inspired by the Casspir
- Gila APC
