= List of killings by law enforcement officers in the United States, August 2025 =

This is a list of people reported killed by non-military law enforcement officers in the United States in August 2025, whether in the line of duty or not, and regardless of reason or method. The listing documents the occurrence of a death, making no implications regarding wrongdoing or justification on the part of the person killed or officer involved. Killings are arranged by date of the incident that caused death. Different death dates, if known, are noted in the description. The table below lists 109 people.

== August 2025 ==
Date	Name (age) of deceased	Race	Location	Description
2025-08-31	Nathan Alexander Orozco (22)	Hispanic	Grand Prairie, Texas	A woman called police to report her boyfriend was driving drunk, armed with a handgun, and assaulting her as he drove. Police located the vehicle at a QuikTrip gas station near Interstate 30, where the woman exited. Police shot the local man after he allegedly reached into the backseat of his car, where police said the firearm was located. The woman was treated by medics at the scene. Witnesses also stated the man had fired his gun out the window several times before police arrived.
2025-08-31	Gary K. Cusick (68)	Unknown	Independence, Missouri	Police responded to a call of a disturbance involving men with guns. Officers approached a man in the backseat of a vehicle and shot him after he allegedly produced a firearm and refused to drop it.
2025-08-31	Efrain Hidalgo (36)	Hispanic	Phoenix, Arizona	Two officers attempted to stop a man on a bicycle for unknown reasons. The man fled on foot, and officers fought with him when they attempted to arrest him. One officer shot and killed the man, who was armed with knife. The footage was released.
2025-08-30	Samuel Holmes IV (41)	Black	Kansas City, Missouri	Missouri State Police stopped an impaired driver during a traffic stop but he fled. During the chase, troopers performed PIT maneuver on the vehicle, causing it to lose control and crash, killing the driver, Holmes.
2025-08-30	Rajon Belt-Stubblefield (37)	Black	Aurora, Colorado	After an attempted traffic stop, Belt-Stubblefield continued driving and collided with multiple vehicles before exiting. Belt-Stubblefield threw a gun onto the ground. The police chief said Belt-Stubblefield told other people at the scene to "get the shit" while pointing at the handgun. The officer pointed his service weapon at him while Belt-Stubblefield kept approaching him with an aggressive manner and fighting stance. After a physical altercation, the officer shot him thrice in the upper torso, killing him. The following footage was released by APD. In early August of 2026, the APD officer involved, Officer Matthew Neely, was indicted by a grand jury on charges of second-degree murder and manslaughter.
2025-08-29	Maria Toedt (40)	Unknown	San Diego, California	A police chase on Interstate 15 ended when the suspect's car collided with other vehicles. Escondido officers would later fire at the suspect, killing her. The California Department of Justice said it was investigating the shooting pursuant to a state law requiring the state DOJ to investigate all fatal police shootings in California where the decedent is unarmed.
2025-08-29	Andrew Lloyd Collamore (23)	White	Peshtigo, Wisconsin	Marinette Police officers and a sheriff's deputy shot and killed a murder suspect following a high-speed chase involving a white Hyundai Tucson. The suspect reportedly exited the vehicle armed with sharp-edged weapon and ignored a taser, prompting the officers to open fire. The suspect was believed to be a squatter who killed the owner of the cabin he was staying in.
2025-08-29	Matthew J. Blanke (53)	Unknown	O'Fallon, Illinois	An officer shot and killed a man armed with a knife who refused to drop it after reportedly assaulting two people. The victims were found running from the home covered in blood.The footage was released.
2025-08-29	Jaime Gonzalez (41)	Hispanic	San Antonio, Texas	Police were called to a home where the homeowner had fired a shotgun into the air following an argument with two motorists. Officers shot the man after he aimed the shotgun at them. The footage was released, though it can't be clearly seen that Gonzalez pointed the weapon at them.
2025-08-28	unidentified male	Unknown	Tucson, Arizona	A person was killed in a shootout when DEA Gang Task Force were serving a warrant at a home. An agent was injured by gunfire.
2025-08-28	Raymond Lee Howard (33)	White	Austin, Texas	Howard, a burglary and armed home invasion suspect, was seen by APD at a strip mall in South Austin. When officers approached Howard, he pulled out a gun before being tackled by a bystander. The officers subsequently shot him dead. The bystander was injured by gunfire. The footage was released by police.
2025-08-28	Jerry Va Thao (42)	Asian	West St. Paul, Minnesota	Following a stand-off, police shot and killed a man in a home after he allegedly pointed a long gun at officers.
2025-08-28	Justin Lowery (30)	Black	Florence County, South Carolina	Officers responded to a shots fired report from a woman at a home. When they found the suspect, the suspect threatened to kill them. After an hours-long standoff, deputies fatally shot him.
2025-08-27	Lula Webber (74)	White	Florence County, South Carolina	Webber and a sheriff's deputy were involved in a vehicular collision at an intersection. Webber and a passenger were taken to a hospital, where she died.
2025-08-27	Michael Broyles (48)	White	Council Bluffs, Iowa	Deputies and state troopers encountered Broyles, a resident from Battlefield, Missouri, during a traffic stop involving a gray Volkswagen Beetle. After a pursuit, he exited the vehicle and fired at officers, whom returned fire and killed him.
2025-08-27	Gregory John Beckmann (74)	Unknown	Orange, California	A local man was struck and killed by a police car driven by an Orange County Sheriff's deputy.
2025-08-27	Travis Michael Manlief (39)	White	Greensburg, Indiana	A Batesville, Indiana man wanted in connection with another criminal incident was shot and killed during a high-risk traffic stop after he reportedly exited his vehicle armed with a handgun.
2025-08-27	Martin Benes (46)	White	Dallas, Texas	SWAT officers fatally shot a wanted and suicidal man after an hours-long standoff at a North Dallas home. The subject was armed with a knife and moved toward officers even after less-lethal attempts. The footage was released by Dallas Police during a news conference.
2025-08-26	Antonio D. Toney (42)	Black	Columbia, South Carolina	Richland deputies responded to reports of shots fired. Toney reportedly raised his gun and pointed it at them before being shot.
2025-08-26	Javier Albriza Jara (50)	Hispanic	West Miami, Florida	A man was killed following a shootout with Miami-Dade deputies at an apartment complex after shooting and injuring his ex-partner.The footage was released.
2025-08-25	Cale Tyler Gilbert (37)	White	Atlantic Beach, Florida	Nine Jacksonville officers opened fire on a local man who was barricaded in his crashed second-generation Chevrolet Silverado when he reached into a rifle case despite numerous commands. The incident occurred following an earlier encounter involving a couple at a boat ramp. Jacksonville Sheriff's Office released the footage.
2025-08-25	unidentified male	Unknown	Bristol, Virginia	A man was fatally shot after reportedly firing a weapon at sheriff's deputies during a response at a residence.
2025-08-24	Justin Andrew Hernandez (34)	Hispanic	San Antonio, Texas	SAPD Officers responded to a self-harm call at a Knights Inn hotel. A man who was reportedly armed with a cutting instrument emerged from his room, made a threat, and charged at the officers. They shot and killed him.
2025-08-24	unidentified male	Unknown	Greenville, Florida	A Madison County deputy fatally shot a man who was reportedly firing shots from the porch and had raised a handgun toward deputies.
2025-08-24	Tyler Simpson (36)	White	Saint Thomas, U.S. Virgin Islands	Simpson, a tourist from Woodinville, Washington, was fatally shot by Virgin Islands police following a burglary in progress call in Frenchman's Bay. Few details were released, though Simpson was reported to be unarmed.
2025-08-24	John Gregory Conner (40)	White	Virginia Beach, Virginia	An off-duty VSP agent shot and killed a man from St. Louis, Missouri who was also a home invasion suspect.
2025-08-23	Erasmo Huerta Gonzalez (38)	Hispanic	New York City, New York	An NYPD officer drove over Huerta Gonzalez as he lied on a path in Flushing Meadows–Corona Park. Witnesses said the officer was speaking to a second officer in the passenger seat when they drove over Huerta Gonzalez.
2025-08-23	Martel Kyles (45)	Black	Grovetown, Georgia	Columbia County Sheriff's Office deployed stipe strips on Kyles's vehicle after he fled from the police during a traffic stop. At some point, he made a right turn with disabled tires which caused the vehicle to crash, flipped, and caught on fire, killing him
2025-08-23	Joseph Merical (35)	White	Fresno, California	Police responded to a domestic violence call and found Merical barricaded in his apartment. Following a stand-off, Merical exited his apartment building, and officers shot him when he charged at them holding two knives. The footage was released.
2025-08-22	Cole Daniel Vannuci (42)	White	Colorado Springs, Colorado	During an operation, officers located Vannuci, who was wanted for kidnapping, in a white Chevrolet TrailBlazer and ordered him to exit. After officers deployed tear gas inside, Vannuci exited the car with a fake MP5 airsoft gun. Officers then immediately shot him dead. The footage was released.The shooting was ruled justified by District Attorney's Office.
2025-08-22	Benjamin Isaac Hale (46)	White	Orlando, Florida	A Xenia, Ohio man sleeping in a downtown park charged at Orlando officers with a pair of scissors while they were responding to an unrelated call. Despite commands to drop the weapon, he continued advancing and was fatally shot. The video was released.
2025-08-22	Javier Nava-Carbajal (48)	Hispanic	Denver, Colorado	Denver Police responded to a domestic violence call following a shots fired report. The suspect, armed with a revolver, struggled with officers during the confrontation before one of them shot him dead.
2025-08-22	Steven Funk (47)	White	Knoxville, Iowa	A man was shot and killed by an officer who responded to a domestic assault where the suspect was found attacking a woman.
2025-08-21	Jacob Illian (39)	Unknown	Escondido, California	A vehicular pursuit ensued after a man on e-bike fled a traffic stop. During the chase, an Escondido police car chased the man on the car-probited bike lane, subsequently struck the man. Attorney said Illian flew forward roughly 100 feet after he was hit from behind. They said the officer then ran over Illian and killed him. The officer involved, Jason Ingco, is facing misdemeanor gross vehicular manslaughter charges. A wrongful death lawsuit against the city is pending.
2025-08-21	Enrique Lopez Gress (25)	Unknown	Chandler, Arizona	Chandler officers responded to a 911 call reporting a home invasion. The suspect fled in a vehicle, leading to a brief pursuit. After crashing, the suspect reportedly exited the vehicle armed with a rifle and was fatally shot by officers.
2025-08-21	James Crary (36)	White	Springfield, Vermont	A county deputy and a Springfield officer shot and killed Crary, a Newport, New Hampshire resident with Claremont ties, as he accelerated toward them in a car during an operation. Witnesses said police told them the operation was not targeting Crary. Both officers were immediately placed on paid leave following the shooting. Crary's death sparked major outrage across New England.The footage was released and the shooting was ruled justified.
2025-08-20	unidentified male	White	Potosi, Missouri	A Washington County deputy fatally shot a man at the end of a vehicle pursuit. The suspect drove toward the deputy, prompting the officer to fire.
2025-08-20	Dennis Martz (57)	White	Menifee, California	Officers responded to a suicide threat at a residence. The suspect, armed with multiple firearms, refused to communicate and pointed a weapon at officers, leading police to shoot him.
2025-08-20	Troy Hamilton (37)	Black	Bel-Ridge, Missouri	St. Ann Police pursued Hamilton after he allegedly fled a traffic stop. When Hamilton arrived at his home in Bel-Ridge, two officers attempted to arrest him and shot him in the process as Hamilton pointed a gun at them during the struggle. The footage was released.
2025-08-19	Derrand Zimmerman (39)	Black	Idaho Falls, Idaho	Police were called to an apartment building where Zimmerman was reported making suicidal and threatening statements while carrying a gun. Officers spoke to Zimmerman and sent in a K-9, which was ineffective. Police shot and killed Zimmerman after he fired a shot at the officers. The footage was released.
2025-08-19	Talon Sessions (35)	White	Shelley, Idaho	A homeowner and a suspect were injured in a shoot-out after the suspect tried to steal the homeowner's four-wheeler. An exchanged of gunfire left both Sessions and the homeowner wounded. Deputies located the suspect in a nearby field and fatally shot them as he tried to raise a revolver toward them. The footage was released.
2025-08-19	Rocky Joe Ellis (47)	White	Phoenix, Arizona	A man armed with a large hatchet advanced toward officers outside a restaurant despite repeated commands and the deployment of a non-lethal tool, leading an officer to shoot him. The bodycam footage was released.
2025-08-18	Jeramy Dawayne Denton (35)	White	Joshua, Texas	Deputies responded to a disturbance call in an unincorporated area and encountered a man armed with a knife. He was fatally shot at the scene.
2025-08-18	Leilani Tripp (53)	Asian	Albuquerque, New Mexico	APD officers shot and killed a woman at an apartment complex after she allegedly emerged armed with two knives and began charging toward officers despite verbal warnings.
2025-08-18	Lucero San Pedro-Castro (29)	Hispanic	South Gate, California	Pedro-Castro was fatally shot by South Gate police officers after she pointed a handgun at them during a traffic stop. The vehicle was connected to an earlier shooting in Huntington Beach.
2025-08-18	Henry Foster (33)	Unknown	Harold, Kentucky	Foster, a Raven, Virginia resident, was fatally shot by Kentucky state troopers after they responded to an incident involving a gun at a Dollar General parking lot. State Police said he threatened to harm himself with a gun before the fatal shooting.
2025-08-17	Hunter Dale Lee Runion (28)	Unknown	Basye, Virginia	A Shenandoah County deputy fatally shot a man during a struggle outside a residence. The man reportedly assaulted the deputy with handcuffs and attempted to disarm him. The incident was recorded on bodycam, according to SCSO.
2025-08-17	Don Albert Stapel Jr. (59)	White	Mears, Michigan	Stapel was fatally shot by a state trooper after an hours-long manhunt, during which residents had been asked to shelter in place.
2025-08-17	Dedrick Bloss (46)	White	Enid, Oklahoma	Enid Police initially responded to a domestic dispute at a hospital. Upon arrival, a shooter killed a security guard before firing shots at them. They returned fire and killed the shooter.
2025-08-17	Lahione Soto (30)	Hispanic	New York City, New York	While an off-duty NYPD officer was standing outside a residential building in Washington Heights, Manhattan, one of the men got off a moped and pulled a gun on him. The officer shot and killed him in response. The other man is at large.
2025-08-16	Boston Cassano (18)	Unknown	Cooper City, Florida	Broward Sheriff's Office responded to a call about a man who had shot himself. The injured man was fatally shot by a deputy after reportedly attacking him. The man's mother and the deputy were injured.
2025-08-16	Michael Woodson (56)	Unknown	Blackstone, Virginia	A suspect, after fleeing at over 100 mph, crashed near the intersection. He ran into nearby woods and was fatally shot by pursuing Nottoway County deputies and state troopers. A deputy was wounded by gunfire.
2025-08-16	Billy Day (44)	White	Crestview, Florida	Police investigating a suspicious vehicle at a closed business found Day holding a gun nearby. After a three-hour stand-off, officers shot and killed Day when he allegedly pointed the gun at police.
2025-08-15	Feglys Antonio Campos Arriba (36)	Hispanic	Denison, Iowa	A man was shot and killed by a Denison police officer during a physical confrontation in a local park after responding to a call.
2025-08-15	Jesse Campbell (44)	White	New York City, New York	Police in Great Kills, Staten Island were called to report a man holding a gun in a diner. The suspect fled the scene and encountered two off-duty NYPD officers, who shot and killed him after he allegedly refused to drop the gun. The gun was found to be a BB gun.
2025-08-15	Georgia Louise Floyd (93)	Unknown	Columbia, Maryland	A woman who was walking on the travel portion of a parking lot was struck and killed by an unmarked patrol car driven by a Howard County officer.
2025-08-15	Carlos Fernandez (29)	Hispanic	Laredo, Texas	Laredo Police received reports of a man making threats and attacking others with a bottle. Whey they arrived, he reportedly advanced and pointed an object toward them. He was then tased before being shot and killed.
2025-08-14	Rafael Rodriguez (78)	Hispanic	Houston, Texas	Police responded to a custody dispute at a home. After units arrived, Rodriguez exited the home and fatally shot his son-in-law. Constable's deputies fatally shot him.
2025-08-14	Matteo Ramirez-Santos (20)	Hispanic	Santa Rosa, California	A man barricaded himself in a home during a domestic violence incident. After hours of unsuccessful negotiation, officers shot and killed him.
2025-08-13	Terrell Lowdermilk (36)	Black	Marietta, Georgia	A man was struck and killed in a hit-and-run involving an off-duty Milton police officer. The officer had since been fired and was charged with vehicular homicide.
2025-08-13	Brian Gillis (30)	Black	Jacksonville, Florida	A man with mental issues reportedly attempted to set a neighbor's house on fire and fled with a knife. Officers located him after a search. He then threatened an officer with the knife. When he ran toward the residential area while armed, the officer shot him in the back, killing him. The footage was released on August 30th.
2025-08-13	Anthony Bottoni (32)	White	Venice, Florida	Bottoni was shot and killed by deputies while they were serving a warrant at a residence. Officials said Bottoni pointed a firearm at deputies after failing to comply with commands, leading them to open fire.
2025-08-13	Hugh Davis Jr. (60)	Black	Buffalo, New York	Cheektowaga Police attempted to arrest a man in North Buffalo in connection to an assault on a hotel employee two days prior. When police located the man, he brandished a knife, and an officer shot him thrice. The bodycam footage was posted on YouTube.
2025-08-12	unidentified male	Unknown	Chandler, Arizona	A wanted suspect was shot and killed by US Marshals after they attempted to arrest him. The suspect, wanted on a federal probation violation related to human smuggling, fled in a vehicle, produced a gun during the encounter, and was killed by police gunfire.
2025-08-12	David Ward (57)	White	Keene, New Hampshire	A man was fatally shot following a prolonged interaction with law enforcement outside a local bank.
2025-08-12	unidentified male	Unknown	St. Lucie County, Florida	A man wanted in connection with a homicide in Palm Beach County was fatally shot after a two-hour standoff. The suspect, who had fled the scene of a shooting in West Palm Beach, was confronted by police after a PIT maneuver was executed. He exited his vehicle armed with a firearm before being shot and killed.
2025-08-11	Nathan Heiberg (42)	White	Moorhead, Minnesota	Officers responded to a domestic assault at an apartment and encountered gunfire. A SWAT team exchanged fire with two brothers inside. Both Nathan and Lucas Heiberg were fatally shot by police. Moorhead Police released the bodycam footages from two of the officers involved, the footages from SWAT members haven't been released.
2025-08-11	Lucas Heiberg (41)	White	Moorhead, Minnesota	Officers responded to a domestic assault at an apartment and encountered gunfire. A SWAT team exchanged fire with two brothers inside. Both Nathan and Lucas Heiberg were fatally shot by police. Moorhead Police released the bodycam footages from two of the officers involved, the footages from SWAT members haven't been released.
2025-08-11	Maurice Antwan Spann (41)	Black	Georgetown, Quitman County, Georgia	Snapp was shot and killed by a Quitman County sheriff after reportedly attacking a woman and then the sheriff near Lucy Lane off State Route 39.
2025-08-10	Stacie Lynn Guerrero (54)	Unknown	Ocoee, Florida	Guerrero was fatally shot by Ocoee Police officers in a parking lot after she struck two officers with a stolen SUV.
2025-08-10	Justin Lieffers (43)	White	Bellevue, Nebraska	Bellevue Officers used force to subdue a suspect who physically resisted, after the suspect reportedly tried to break in a residence and flee. The suspect, Lieffers, a local man, became unresponsive and died.
2025-08-10	Mari Bonnici (38)	White	Santa Rosa, California	An off-duty sheriff's deputy killed Bonnici, his ex-girlfriend, before killing himself.
2025-08-10	Jonathan Velasquez (34)	Hispanic	Houston, Texas	A man, suspected of recently committing an armed robbery, was fatally shot by Houston Police officers after a vehicular pursuit. He refused to drop the weapon before officers shot him. The footage was released.
2025-08-09	Amanda Williams (39)	White	Bozrah, Connecticut	State troopers responded to a report of a woman pointing a gun at a man. After pepper balls were ineffective, troopers shot and killed Williams. The footage was released.
2025-08-09	Roberto Leyva Sanchez (36)	Hispanic	Yakima, Washington	Police responded to a shooting stemmed from a domestic violence incident which left a woman dead and a juvenile injured. Police later shot and killed the passenger of the suspecting vehicle after he fired at them at the end of the pursuit, which left an officer injured.
2025-08-09	Dandre McIntosh (31)	Black	Milwaukee, Wisconsin	Following a string of business robberies, police were investigating a vehicle believed to be involved that was found behind a residence. Police found McIntosh on the back porch and shot him after he refused to drop a gun.MPD released the footage.
2025-08-08	Charles Hedgers (32)	White	Wasilla, Alaska	State troopers attempted to arrest Hedgers for an outstanding parole warrant. During the encounter, Hedgers reportedly barricaded himself while armed with a handgun. A trooper then fatally shot Hedgers.
2025-08-08	Paul Beasley Jr. (24)	Black	Kansas City, Kansas	Beasley Jr., an armed robbery suspect, demanded a cashier to call the police to come. Upon arrival, five officers shot and killed Beasley during a confrontation outside the store.
2025-08-08	Patrick Wilfred Sathyanathan (60)	Asian	Bellevue, Washington	A man reportedly charged at people with a sword before barricading himself in his apartment. During the standoff, the man reportedly shot at officers with an airsoft rifle containing metal projectiles. Officers shot and killed him.
2025-08-08	Brittany Shaw (35)	White	Tustin, California	An off-duty Orange County deputy fatally shot her roommate at her residence. The supervisor believed that the deputy mistook her roommate for intruder due to her job in jail system.
2025-08-08	Deborah Terrell (68)	Black	New Brunswick, New Jersey	Police received a report of a woman walking in a hallway while armed with a knife. Officers tried to subdue her with tasers and pepper spray before one of them shot and killed her as she continued to advance. The footage was released.
2025-08-08	Sebastian Gomez (34)	Hispanic	North Las Vegas, Nevada	North Las Vegas Police Officers shot and killed a man who reportedly charged at them with a knife following a domestic disturbance call.
2025-08-08	Dwayne D. Harris (31)	Black	Norfolk, Virginia	Officers responded to a home where they found an armed suspect who just had broken inside. After being found, the suspect fled for two blocks before being stopped by police. He reportedly exited the vehicle and pointed the gun at officers before being fatally shot.
2025-08-08	Jason Corey Kilzer (44)	White	Reagan, Tennessee	A US Marshals task force member shot and killed a Lexington, Tennessee man when they were attempting to arrest him on multiple felony warrants. The man fled in a car and exited it with a gun when members shot him.
2025-08-08	Peter Delnardo Lilly (46)	Black	Charleston, West Virginia	Police were called to a Charleston Area Medical Center hospital for reports of a man behaving erratically, having discharged a fire extinguisher and locked himself in a bathroom with a knife. After police arrived, officers shot the man when he allegedly approached a hospital employee in an elevator.
2025-08-07	Matthew Foster (24)	White	Pittsburgh, Pennsylvania	Foster was shot and killed by Pittsburgh police in a Greenfield stairwell after he reportedly ignored commands and threatened officers with a knife. He was tased but continued to advance, prompting officers to open fire.
2025-08-07	Tyrell Askerneese (46)	Black	Shenango Township, Mercer County, Pennsylvania	State troopers, sheriff's deputies, and township police attempted to serve a warrant on Askerneese at a hotel. Police shot and killed Askerneese, though few details were immediately released.
2025-08-06	Miguel Angel Gonzalez-Rasalas (38)	Hispanic	Charlotte, North Carolina	An inmate who was suspected of murder received the wrong medication from prison staff and died from methadone toxicity.
2025-08-06	Carmine Faino (61)	Unknown	Thompson Township, Susquehanna County, Pennsylvania	PSP state troopers responded to a home for a welfare check. Upon arrival, they were ambushed by an armed suspect who was later killed by returned fire. Two troopers were injured. Police determined that the suspect had killed his neighbor before the ambush.
2025-08-06	Paul Rodriguez (57)	Black	Temple, Texas	Police received a call from a man who was suicidal and wanted to suicide by cop. When officers came, the man removed a BB pistol from his head and pointed it at them. Officers then shot and killed him.
2025-08-06	Troy Plascencia (36)	White	Amargosa Valley, Nevada	A Nye County deputy responded to a report of a possible suicidal person. The person charged at the deputy with a knife before being fatally shot.
2025-08-05	Chaofeng Ge (32)	Asian	Philipsburg, Pennsylvania	An ICE detainee was found dead four days after being taken into custody, reportedly with his hands and feet tied behind him, according to his attorney.
2025-08-05	David Maupin (46)	White	Burlington, Iowa	Deputies shot and killed a reportedly armed man following a domestic disturbance call.
2025-08-05	Brandon M. Lewis (41)	Black	Peoria, Illinois	Two officers responded to a report of a suspicious man. Lewis swung a baseball bat at officers, leading one to use a taser and the other, former basketball player Da'Monte Williams, to shoot him. The footage was released by state police.
2025-08-05	Said Ezzine (48)	Middle Eastern	Greensboro, North Carolina	A resident flagged down a police officer for a trespassing report. When the officer contacted the trespasser, he refused to comply and moved toward the officer with a pipe wrench. The officer shot and killed him. The footage was released in May 2026 and the shooting was justified.
2025-08-04	Schace Wayne Looking Horse (31)	Native American	Philip, South Dakota	Tribal Police were chasing a vehicle related to a weapons call, during which, Horse fired shots at them. After his vehicle was disabled, he managed to hold a person hostage and steal another vehicle. He was shot dead by police after the chase.
2025-08-04	Angel Montaño (27)	Hispanic	Richmond, California	Officers responded to a report about an armed man making threats. Upon arrival, the suspect confronted them with two knives. Two officers shot him dead. The footage was released on KCRT TV channel.
2025-08-04	Ryan McBride (41)	White	Shelbyville, Kentucky	An officer responding to a domestic violence report shot and killed McBride after he allegedly shot at the officer.
2025-08-03	Donald Taylor (32)	Black	Hollywood, Florida	Police shot and killed a suspect who was involved in multiple armed robberies and a shooting. Hollywood Police said when detectives tried to make contact with him, he was armed and refused to comply before the shooting.
2025-08-03	Gregory Paige (27)	Black	St. Marys, Georgia	A woman called the police stating that Paige was threatening to kill her and grabbed her aggressively. Two officers shot and killed Paige during the encounter.
2025-08-03	Jimmy Jones (52)	Black	Lake View, South Carolina	A stand-off broke out after a report of a disturbance at a home involving an armed man. After several hours, police shot and killed the man when he allegedly fired at them.
2025-08-03	Jesse Robinson (35)	Native American	Muncie, Indiana	Police responded to reports of a man shooting at houses and encountered Robinson holding a handgun. One officer fatally shot the man.
2025-08-02	Patrick Edward Walsh (64)	White	Arroyo Hondo, Taos County, New Mexico	A man died shortly after being handcuffed by a Taos County deputy outside a local market and lounge. The autopsy report ruled it a homicide.
2025-08-02	Lauren Semanchik (33)	White	Franklin Township, Somerset County, New Jersey	New Jersey State Trooper Ricardo Jorge Santos shot and killed his ex-girlfriend and a volunteer firefighter she was dating at a home before turning the gun on himself. Their bodies were found on Saturday afternoon.
2025-08-02	Tyler Webb (29)	White	Franklin Township, Somerset County, New Jersey	New Jersey State Trooper Ricardo Jorge Santos shot and killed his ex-girlfriend and a volunteer firefighter she was dating at a home before turning the gun on himself. Their bodies were found on Saturday afternoon.
2025-08-02	Lauree Jankowski (33)	White	Columbus, Nebraska	While CPD officers were investigating an incident, a woman attacked and injured one of them with a knife. The other officer shot and killed her.
2025-08-02	Martin Hernandez (33)	Hispanic	Albuquerque, New Mexico	Albuquerque Fire Rescue requested for officers after hearing gunshots while they were responding to a call. A woman later told officers that she was involved in a domestic fight with her boyfriend. Officers located and commanded the armed man to drop the gun. One of them fired a less lethal round before the other officer shot and killed the man. A gun was found next to him.The footage was released.
2025-08-02	Jonathan Vince (42)	White	Many, Louisiana	A person was shot dead by a Sabine Parish deputy.
2025-08-02	Jonathon Landis (30)	White	Kokomo, Indiana	Police responded to a shooting report at off-campus housing for Indiana University Kokomo. When they arrived, they reportedly found Landis, an IU Kokomo student, actively firing shots. Officers returned fire, killing him.

== See also ==
- Death in custody § United States
- Henry A. Wallace Police Crime Public Database
- List of cases of police brutality
- List of countries with annual rates and counts for killings by law enforcement officers
- List of law enforcement officers killed in the line of duty in the United States
- List of law enforcement officers convicted for an on-duty killing in the United States
- List of shootings by US immigration agents
- List of police reforms related to the George Floyd protests
- List of unarmed African Americans killed by law enforcement officers in the United States
- Lists of killings by law enforcement officers
- Police brutality in the United States
- Police misconduct § United States
- Police riot § United States
- Police use of deadly force in the United States
