= Shreveport Area Transit System =

Bus transportation system in Shreveport, Louisiana

- Founded: 1972
- Headquarters: 1237 Murphy Street; Shreveport, Louisiana, U.S.
- Locale: Caddo and Bossier Parishes
- Service area: Shreveport and Bossier City
- Service type: bus service, paratransit
- Routes: 17
- Hubs: SporTran Transfer Hub
- Fleet: 50
- Operator: Shreveport Transit Management
- Website: http://www.sportran.org/

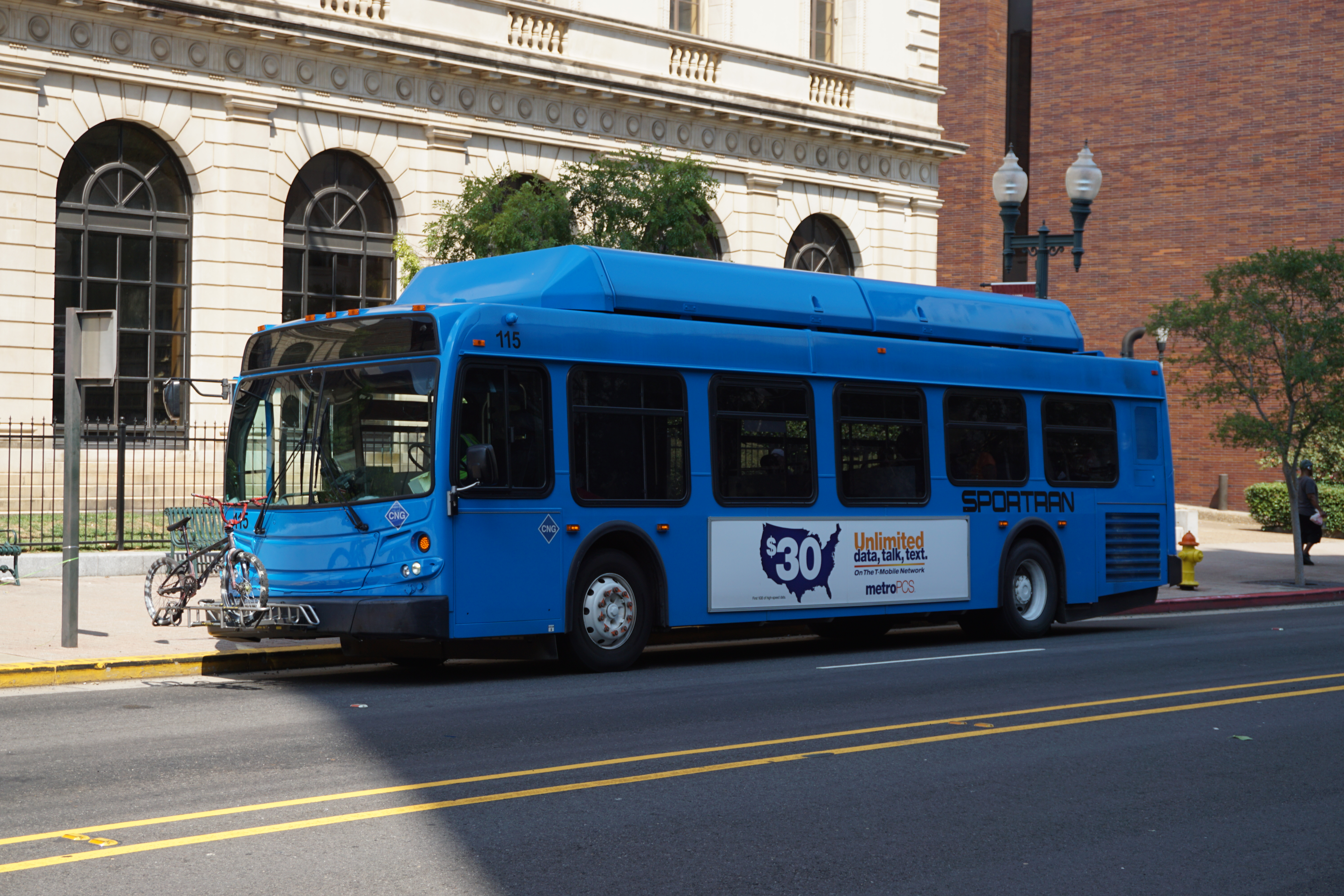
A SporTran bus in 2015

The Shreveport Area Transit System, commonly known as SporTran, is a public transportation bus system based in Shreveport, Louisiana, United States. It runs bus routes in Shreveport and Bossier City, Louisiana, as well as paratransit service. All bus routes converge at the Intermodal Facility near Downtown Shreveport. The entire system has been zero-fare since 2022.

SporTran was established in 1972 after the Shreveport city government purchased an existing private system. The city previously had privately-run streetcars and trolleybuses that were gradually replaced with diesel buses by the 1960s. SporTran operates seven days a week on 17 bus routes from 6:00 a.m. to 1:00 a.m., with shorter operations on the weekends. As of 2006, SporTran operates night service on five routes (mostly supplementing daytime service after end of service) between 8:00 p.m. and midnight Monday through Saturday with no service on Sundays.

SporTran has a fleet of over 50 buses equipped to handle all passengers, including those with disabilities. Their newest buses are equipped with the emission reduction systems and an experimental dual-fuel (Hybrid) bus was placed in service in 2005. Buses are operated by the city governments of Shreveport and Bossier City as well as the Port of Caddo-Bossier; most of its funding is from grants and the state government due to the lack of a municipal funding source. The system has 40 buses powered by compressed natural gas; all of them were pulled after an empty bus caught fire and exploded in April 2025.

== Facilities ==
=== Downtown Terminal ===
Address: 1237 Murphy St, Shreveport LA 71104
Coordinates: 32°30′42″N 93°44′52″W
Facilities: All routes connect at this downtown bus terminal, which was opened in 1986

=== Bus Garage ===
Address: 1115 Jack Wells Boulevard, Shreveport
Facilities: Shreveport Transit Management office and bus maintenance

== Routes ==
Regular routes
No.	Name	Places served and notes
1	Hearne Loop	Loops south-central part of Shreveport
2	MLKing Circulator	Loops MLK neighborhood area
3	Queensboro	West and Southwest Shreveport including Regional Airport
4	Fairgrounds	West Shreveport, Louisiana State Fairgrounds including Independence Stadium and Fair Grounds Field
5	Linwood	South Shreveport (west of #6), including LSU Medical Center / UniversityHealth
6	Cedar Grove	South Shreveport (east of #5, west of #7)
7	Line Ave.	South Shreveport (east of #6)
8	Highland	Southeast Shreveport (west of #9)
9	Broadmoor	Southeast Shreveport (east of #8)
11	Southern Hills	Southwest Shreveport
12	M.L. King, Jr.	North and Northwest Shreveport including Southern University
14	Barksdale	Barksdale AFB and southern Bossier
15	North Bossier	Willis-Knighton Bossier Health Center
16	East Bossier	Bossier Parish Community College
17	Midday Bossier	Special route serving Bossier on weekdays from 9am–2pm (basically combining #s 15&16)
18	Russell Road	Northwest Shreveport including Southern University
19	Allendale	Area near and northwest of Downtown Shreveport
20	Pines Road	West Shreveport
Night Service
No.	Name	Places served and notes
N-101	Shreveport	East Shreveport, V.A. Medical Center, LSU Shreveport
N-201	Shreveport	
N-301	Shreveport	LSU Medical Center / UniversityHealth, Regional Airport
N-401	North Shreveport	North Shreveport, Southern University
N-501	East Bossier	Bossier Parish Community College
N-601	North Bossier	Willis-Knighton Bossier Health Center
