= Chevrolet Silverado (second generation) =

Series of trucks by General Motors

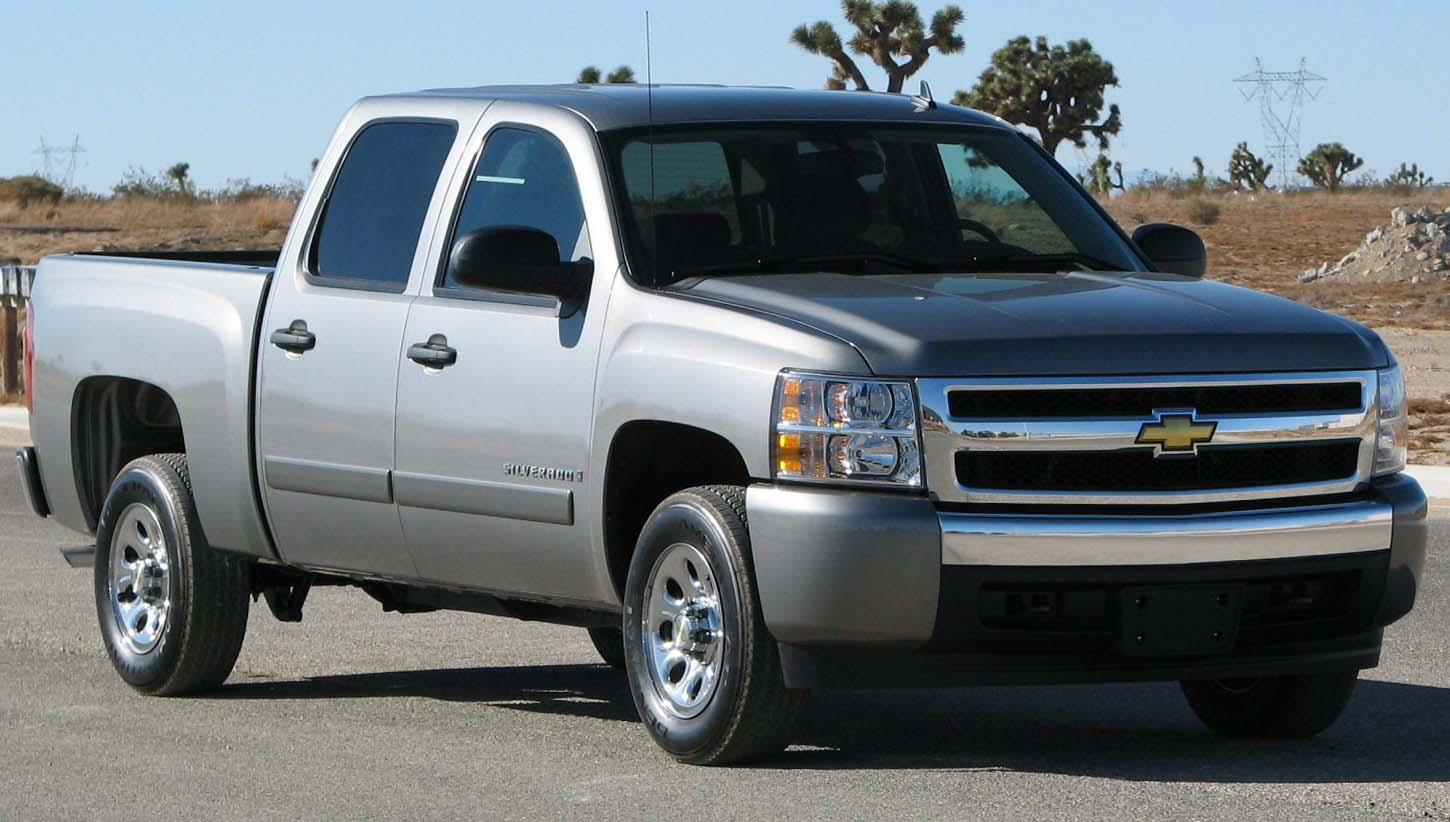

Overview
- Also called: GMC Sierra
- Production: September 2006 – 2013
- Model years: 2007–2013
- Assembly: United States: Roanoke, Indiana (Fort Wayne Assembly); Flint, Michigan (Flint Truck Assembly); Pontiac, Michigan (Pontiac East Assembly) (2007–2009MY only); Canada: Oshawa, Ontario (Oshawa Truck Assembly) (2007–2009MY only); Mexico: Silao, Guanajuato (Silao Assembly)
- Designer: Wayne Cherry (2003, 2004)

Body and chassis
- Platform: GM GMT900 platform: GMT901 (Chevrolet Silverado); GMT902 (GMC Sierra)

Powertrain
- Engine: 4.3 L LU3/LG3 V6; 4.8 L Vortec 4800 V8; 5.3 L Vortec 5300 V8; 6.0 L Vortec 6000 V8; 6.2 L Vortec 6200 V8
- Transmission: 4-speed 4L60-E automatic 4-speed 2ML70 (2-mode hybrid); 6-speed manual (4.3 L V6 in Mexico only); 6-speed 6L80 automatic

Dimensions
- Wheelbase: Regular cab/6.5' bed: 119 in (3,023 mm); Regular cab/8' bed: 133 in (3,378 mm); Extended cab/5.75' bed: 133.9 in (3,401 mm); Extended cab/6.5' bed & crew cab/5.75' bed: 143.5 in (3,645 mm); Extended cab/8' bed: 157.5 in (4,000 mm)
- Length: Regular cab/6.5' bed: 205.6 in (5,222 mm); Regular cab/8' bed: 224.5 in (5,702 mm); Extended cab/5.75' bed: 220.3 in (5,596 mm); Extended cab/6.5' bed & crew cab/5.75' bed: 229.9 in (5,839 mm); Extended cab/8' bed: 248.8 in (6,320 mm)
- Width: Regular & extended: 79.9 in (2,029 mm); Crew: 80 in (2,032 mm)
- Height: Regular & extended: 73.9 in (1,877 mm); Crew: 73.8 in (1,875 mm); Hybrid 4WD: 73.7 in (1,872 mm)

Chronology
- Predecessor: Chevrolet Silverado (first generation)
- Successor: Chevrolet Silverado (third generation)

The second generation of the Chevrolet Silverado is a series of trucks manufactured by General Motors from 2006 until 2013 under the Chevrolet brand, and also under the GMC brand as the GMC Sierra.

== Overview ==
The GMT900 generation of the Silverado/Sierra arrived in the last quarter of 2006 as a 2007 model. It features a redesigned exterior, interior, frame, and suspension as well as power increases on certain engines. Like the previous generation GMT800's and earlier C/K lines, it takes many styling cues from the GMT900 SUVs of the same year. Like the GMT900 SUVs, these pickups have improved aerodynamics over their predecessors thanks to steeply raked windshields and tighter panel gaps which help improve fuel economy. The previous GMT800 models were continued through 2007 badged as "Classic," just as the GMT400 models continued for two years after the GMT800's introduction.

The second-generation Silverado earned the North American Truck of the Year award for 2007 and was Motor Trend magazine's Truck of the Year for 2007.

== Light duty ==
Like its predecessors, the new Silverado offers buyers a choice of two-door regular cabs, four-door extended cabs (with front-opening rear doors that now open 170 degrees similar to the Nissan Titan) and four-door crew cabs. GM also offers the trucks in the traditional two- and four-wheel-drive configurations. The Silverado and Sierra 1500 Work Truck trim level now adds a crew cab configuration. All 1500 models now feature front coil springs and rack-and-pinion power steering.

For the 2007 model year, the Sierra Denali shares the same billet grille from the other Denali models, and also has the same dash as the 2007 SUVs. The 2007 Sierra Denali was initially the only half-ton pickup that had a 6.2L V8 engine with 403 hp (301 kW) and 417 lb⋅ft (565 N⋅m) of torque paired to a six-speed automatic transmission. The Denali is also an optional all-wheel-drive vehicle and can reach 0–60 mph (0–97 km/h) in 6.3 seconds.

For the 2011 model year of the Silverado/Sierra, the production of 1500 crew cab models partially moved from Silao, Mexico, to Flint, Michigan.

=== Powertrain ===
The Generation III small-block V8 engines offered in the GMT800 trucks were replaced in the GMT900 series by the Generation IV small-block V8 engine family, featuring upgrades such as increased power and Active Fuel Management on the 5.3L and 6.0L engines. A new high-performance 6.2L V8 (with 403 hp (301 kW) and 417 lb⋅ft (565 N⋅m) of torque) was introduced with the 2007 Cadillac Escalade and GMC Sierra/Yukon Denali line, and was made available in the Silverado 1500 for MY 2009.

After skipping the 2008 model year, with 2007 being the last for the GMT800 hybrid line, a two-mode hybrid model was introduced in late 2008 as a 2009 model. However, poor sales led General Motors to discontinue the Silverado/Sierra Hybrid along with the Chevrolet Tahoe/GMC Yukon/Cadillac Escalade Hybrid and Avalanche/Escalade EXT after the 2013 model year, though it was one of the first two hybrid pickup trucks to be manufactured. Available in either two- or four-wheel drive, and exclusively in a Crew Cab configuration, the Silverado/Sierra 1500 Hybrid is powered by a 6.0-liter V8. It is joined by two 60-kilowatt electric motors supplied by a nickel–metal hydride battery pack under the rear seat. On its own, the V8 is rated at 332 horsepower and 367 pound-feet of torque. GM engineers say that combined output with the electric motors is 379 hp. The unique 2ML70 transmission / hybrid drive unit houses the electric motors along with three planetary gear sets and four traditional clutches.

As of 2008, GM full-size trucks were no longer sold in United States and Canada with manual transmissions; instead, they were only offered in Mexico in the Silverado 1500 with 4.3L V6 and Silverado 3500.

=== Interior ===
There were two dash options offered in this generation Silverado and Sierra: a luxury-inspired dash that closely mimics the dash in their GMT900 SUVs (LTZ/SLT trims), and a more traditional upright dash to make room for a passenger seat in place of a center console (lower trims).

=== Exterior ===
All Silverado and Sierra 1500 models received a revised bumper and shortened front fascia for the 2009 model year, and extended and crew cab models equipped with the Vortec 5300 V8 received a new six-speed 6L80 automatic transmission. The Vortec 6200 V8 was made available for Silverado LT/LTZ and Sierra SLE/SLT models. Bluetooth was added to the equipment list, becoming standard on Denali, SLT, and LTZ, and optional on SLE and LT, as was an optional backup camera. An integrated trailer brake controller, first available on the Silverado and Sierra HD for 2007, is now an option on 1500 series trucks. The XFE package was new for 2009, available only on Silverado 1500 Crew Cab LT 2WD models. It included the 5.3L Vortec V8 with Active Fuel Management, a soft tonneau cover, XFE badging, aluminum wheels, and low rolling resistance tires.

A refresh followed with all 2010 models, including new interior door panels (which moved the handle forward and added an additional cup holder), and a six-speed automatic transmission on Regular Cab models with the 5.3L V8 was also made standard. The 6.2L V8 was given wider availability, now being optional on LT and SLE Extended and Crew Cabs, completely supplanting the light-duty Vortec 6000 V8 in the process. The new Z71 Appearance Package was optional on LT and LTZ, which included body-color grille and front fascia, body-color door handles and mirror caps, unique Z71 bed decals, chrome sill plates, and a unique Z71 gauge cluster. Two new exterior colors were added: Taupe Gray Metallic and Sheer Silver Metallic.

For 2012, the Silverado and Sierra 1500 received another refresh. This time, the Silverado was given new grille and front fascia treatments for both LT and LTZ models. A newly redesigned touch-screen navigation radio was optional on LTZ, SLT, and Denali. Trailer sway control and hill start assist are now standard on all models. Cooled seats were made optional on LTZ and SLT, and the woodgrain trim was replaced with brushed aluminum.

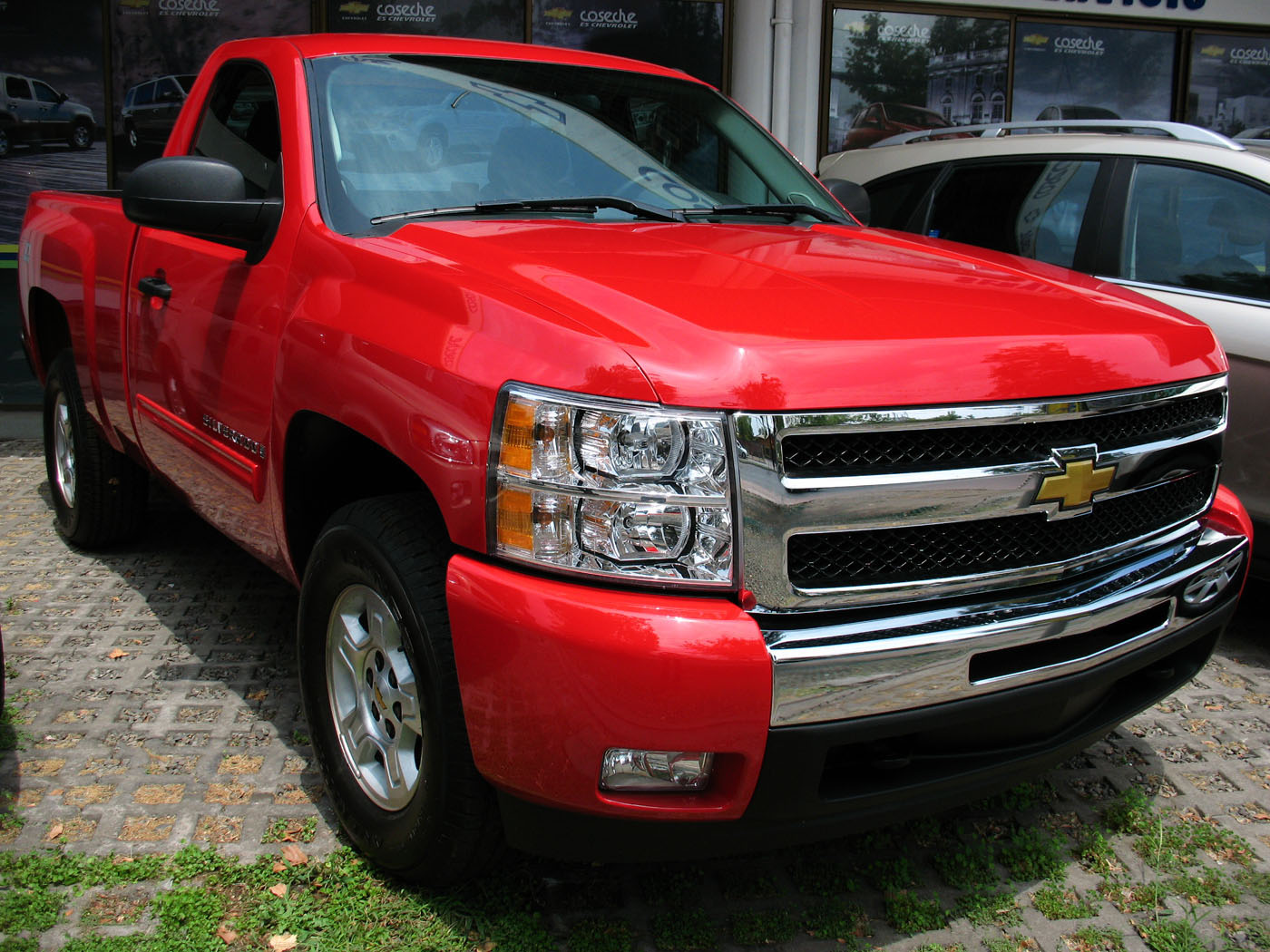
2009 Chevrolet Silverado Single Cab in Chile

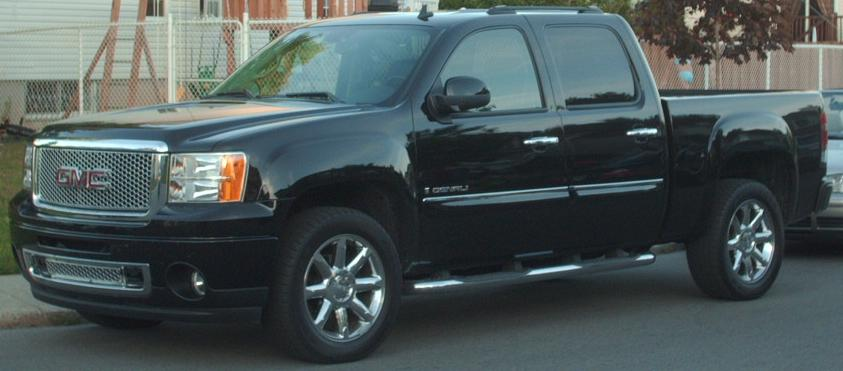
2007 GMC Sierra Denali

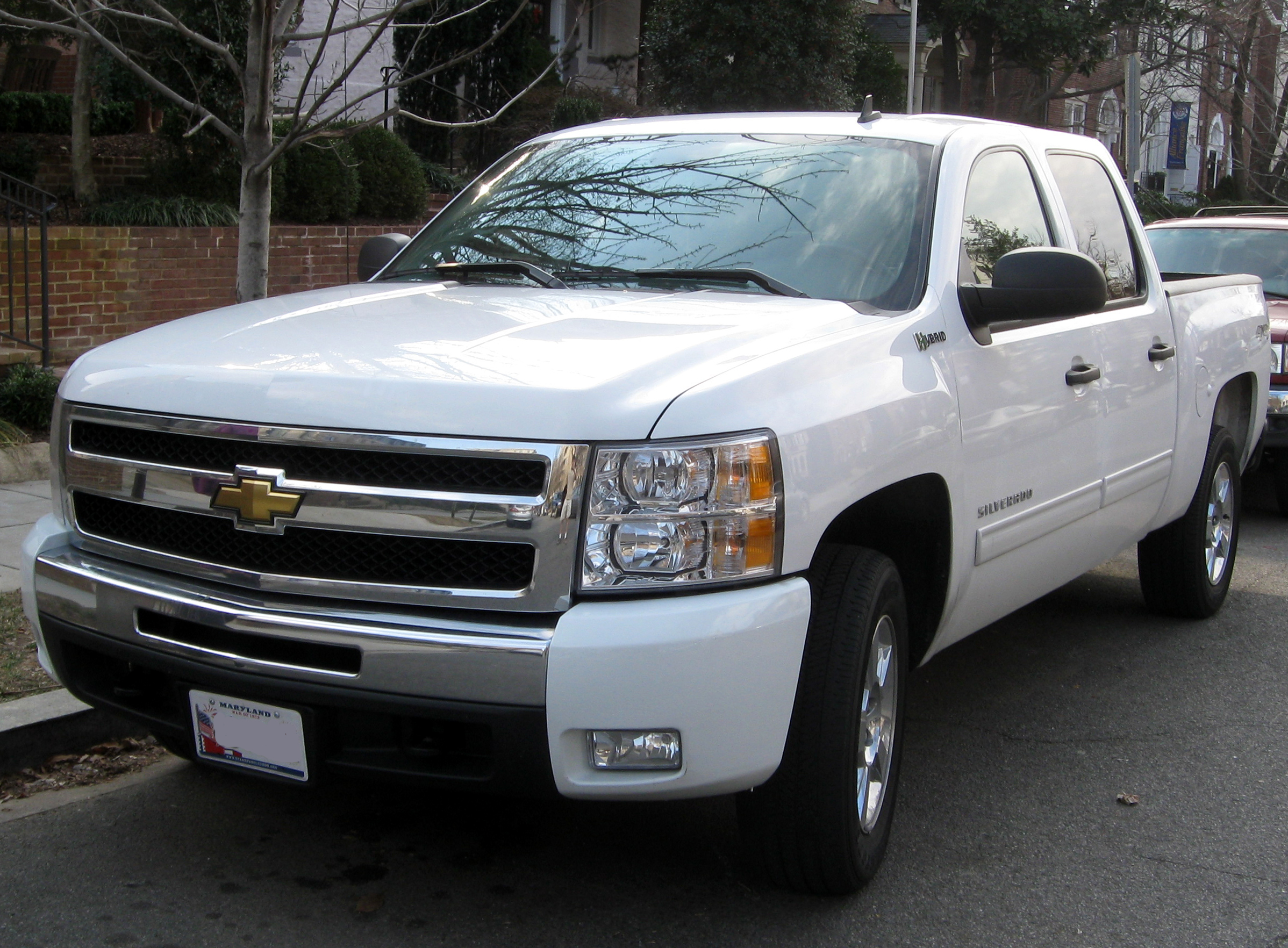
Chevrolet Silverado Hybrid

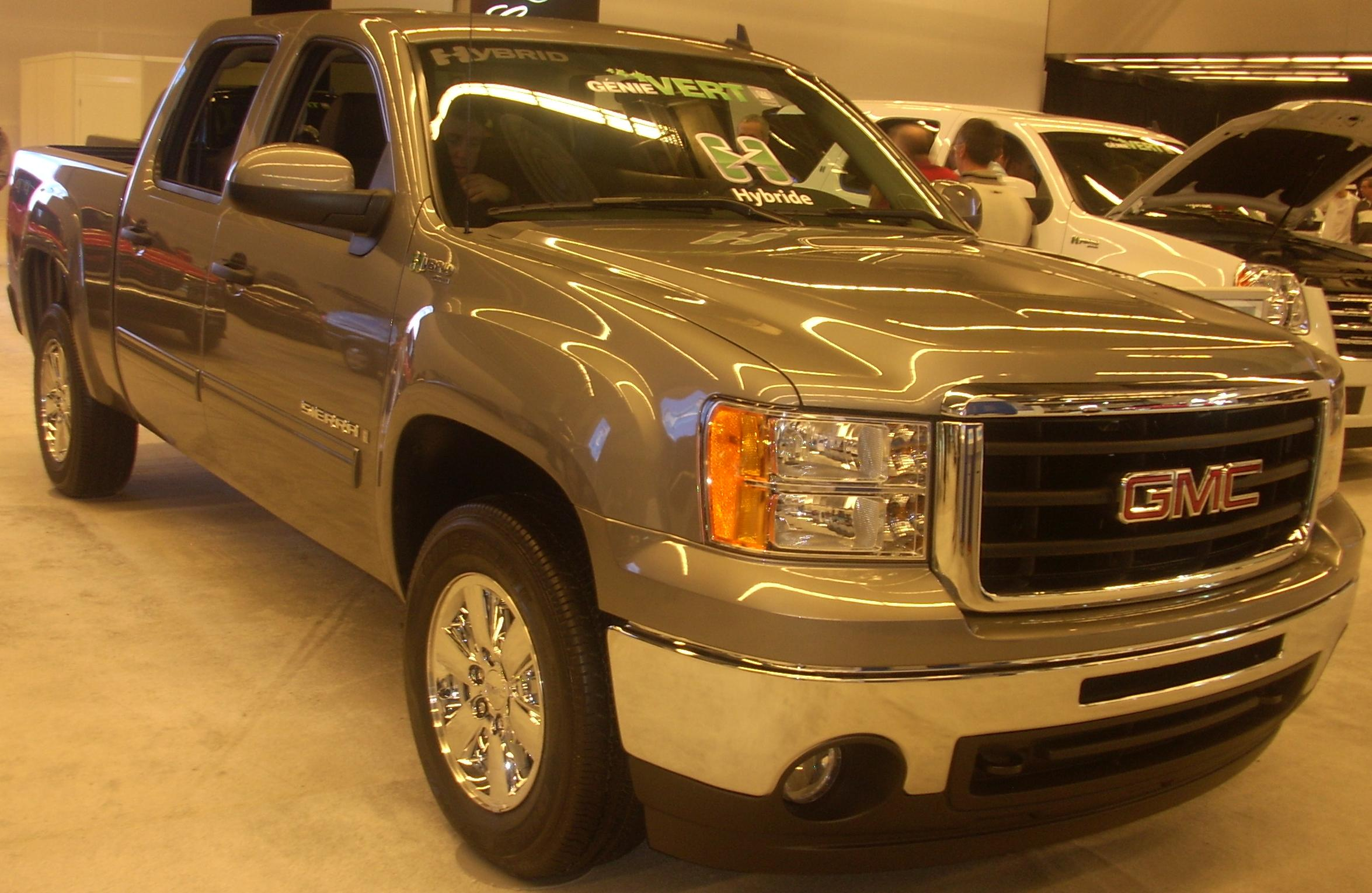
2009 GMC Sierra Hybrid

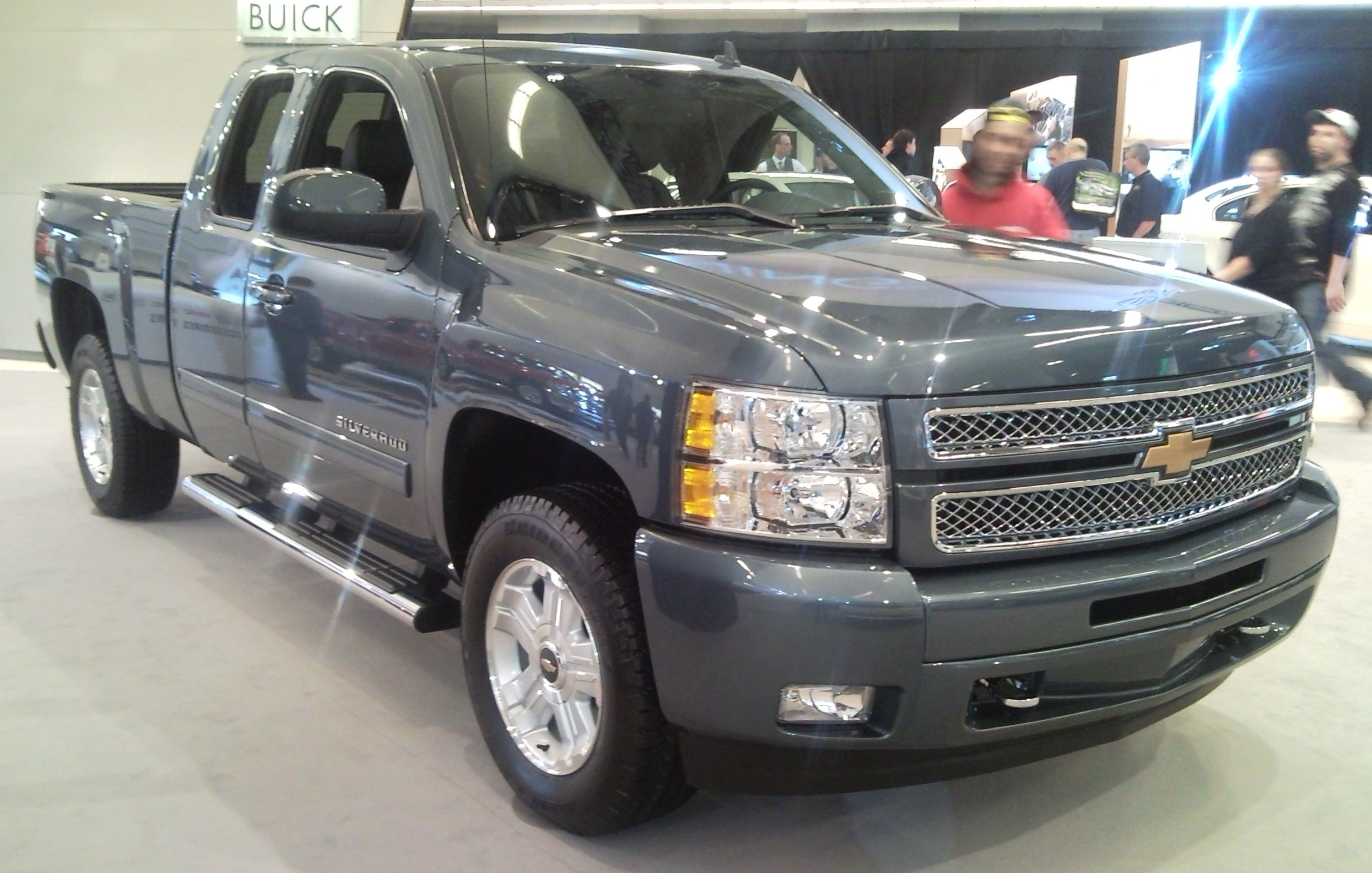
2012 Chevrolet Silverado 1500 LTZ Extended Cab

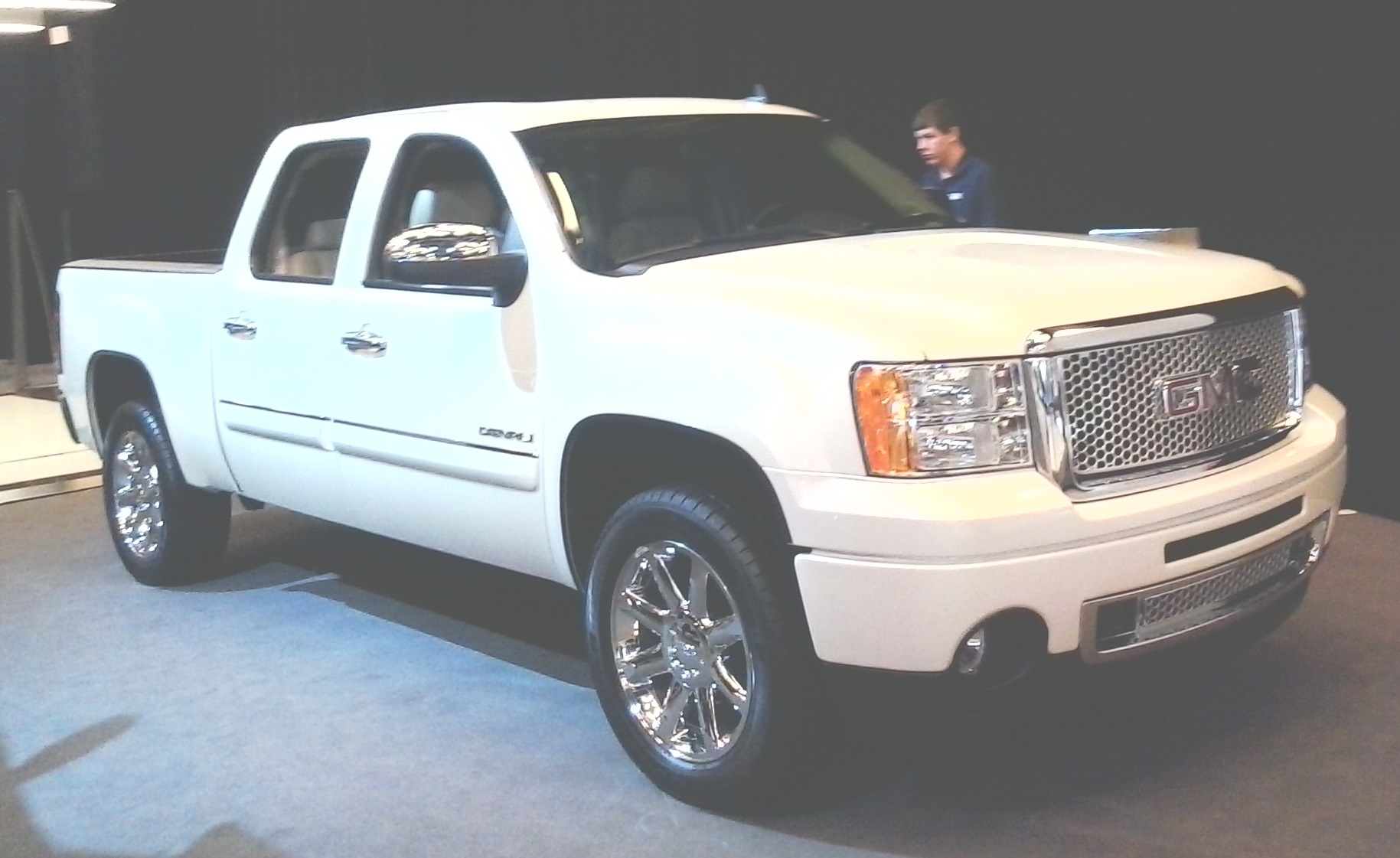
2013 GMC Sierra Denali Crew Cab

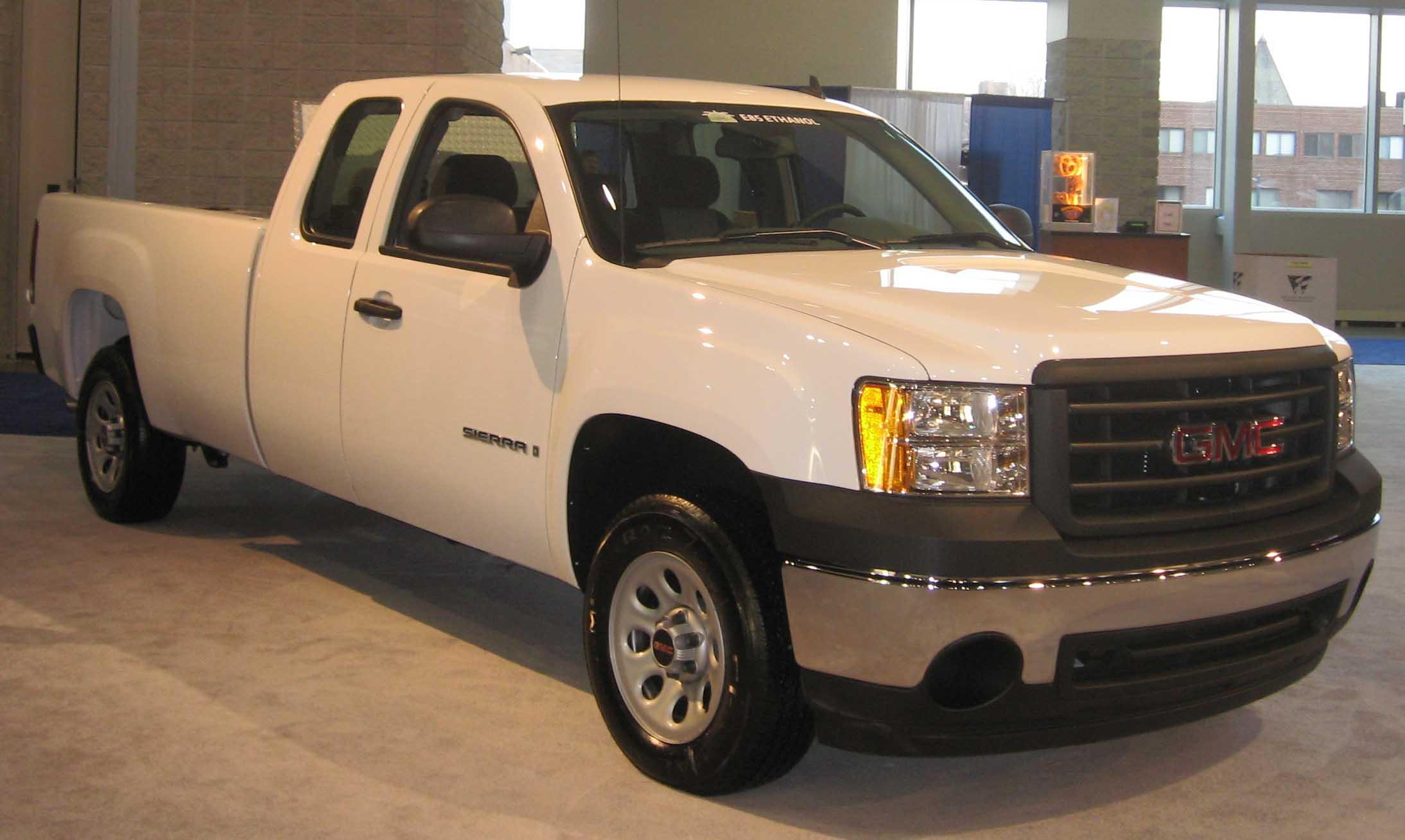
2008 GMC Sierra 1500 SL Extended Cab

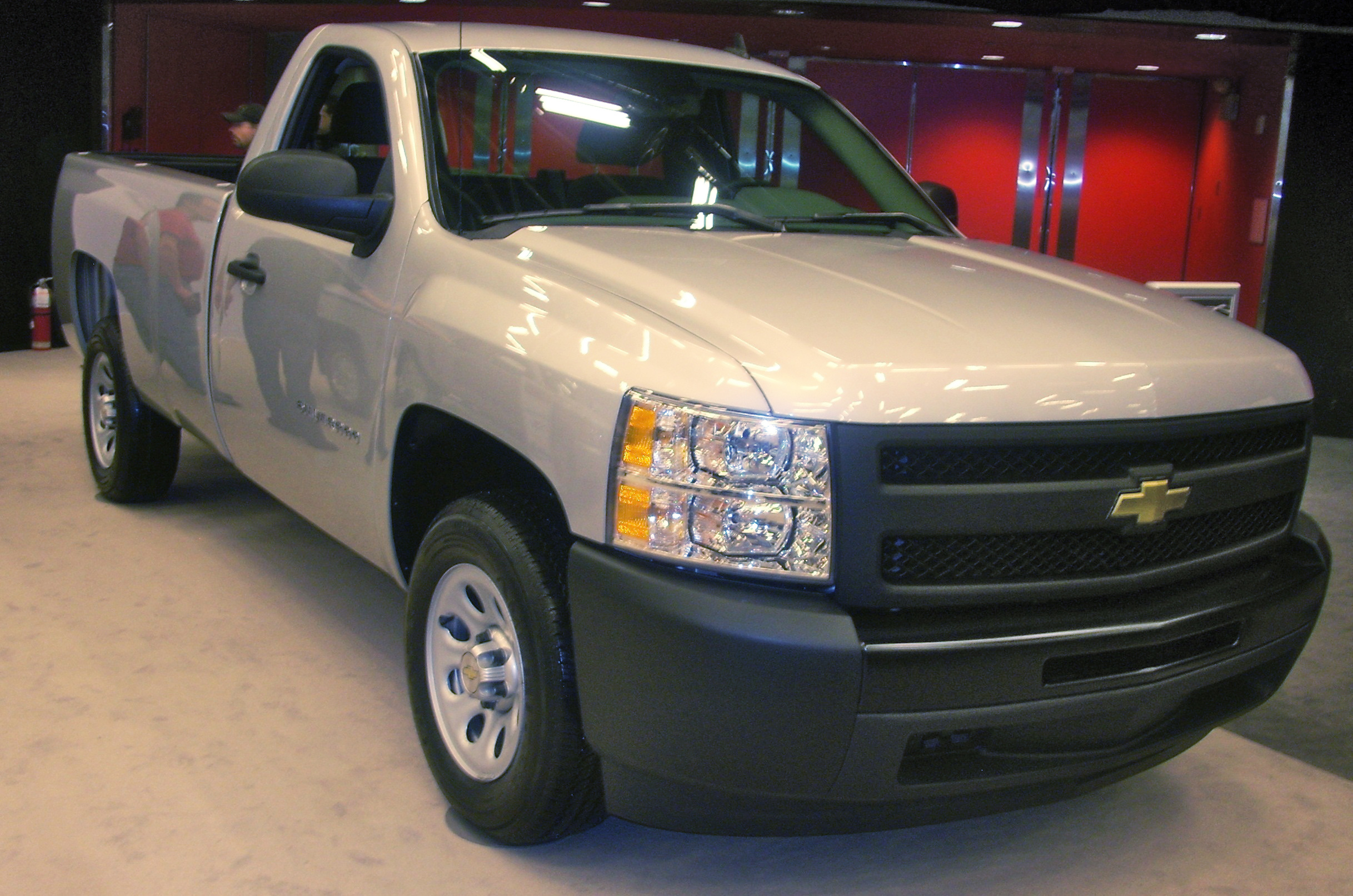
2010 Chevrolet Silverado 1500 WT Single Cab

== HD ==
GMT900 Heavy Duty
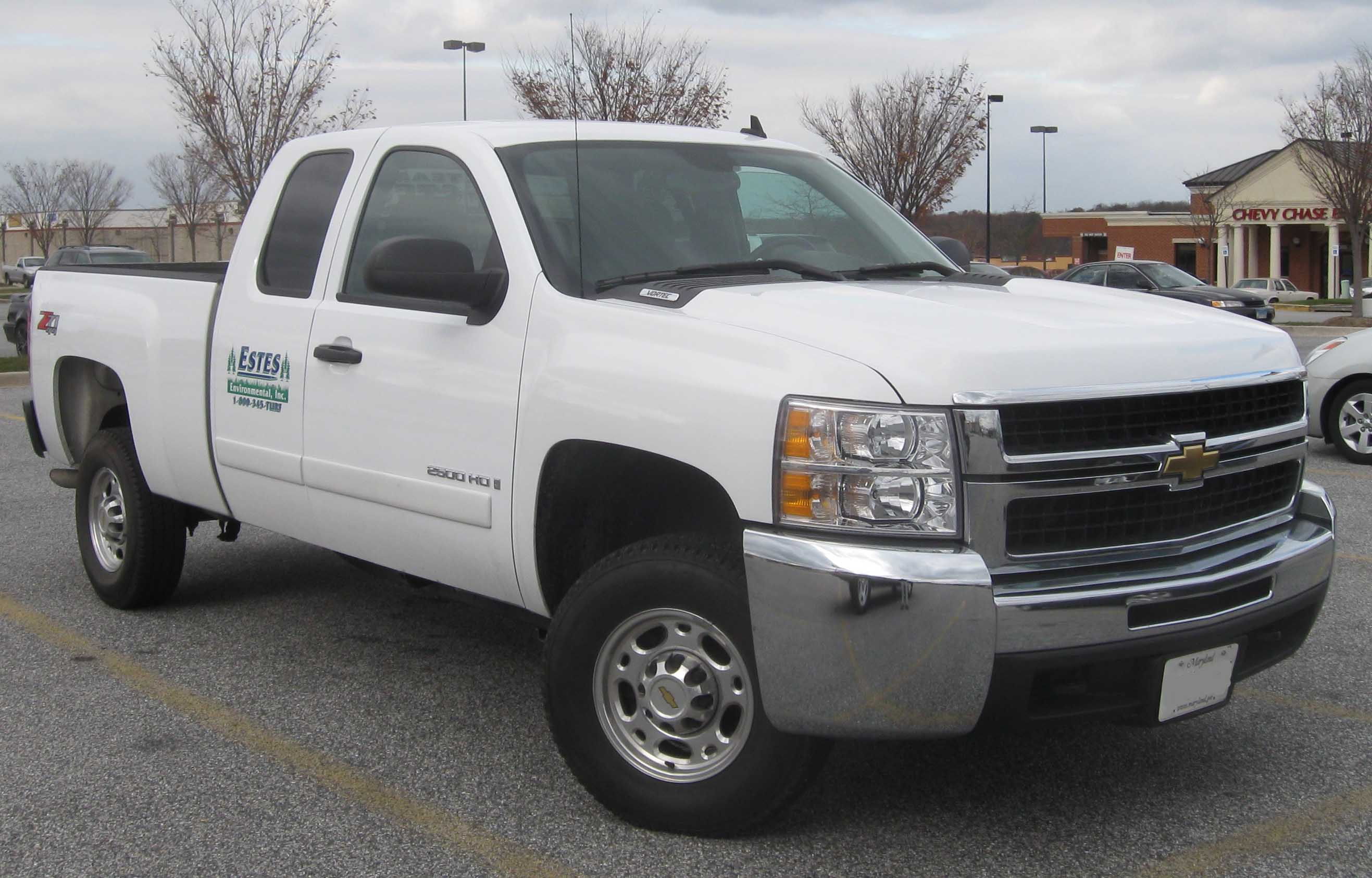

Overview
- Production: 2007–2014
- Designer: Wayne Cherry (2004)

Body and chassis
- Platform: GM GMT910 platform: GMT911 (Chevrolet Silverado); GMT912 (GMC Sierra)

Powertrain
- Engine: 6.0 L Vortec 6000 V8; 6.6 L Duramax turbo-diesel V8
- Transmission: 6-speed 6L90 automatic 6-speed Allison 1000 automatic 6-speed manual (3500 in Mexico only)

Dimensions
- Wheelbase: Regular cab: 133 in (3,378 mm); Extended cab/6.5' bed: 143.5 in (3,645 mm); Extended cab/8' bed: 157.5 in (4,000 mm); Crew cab/6.5' bed: 153 in (3,886 mm); Crew cab/8' bed: 167 in (4,242 mm)
- Length: Regular cab: 224.7 in (5,707 mm); Extended cab/6.5' bed: 230.3 in (5,850 mm); Extended cab/8' bed: 249.2 in (6,330 mm); Crew cab/6.5' bed: 239.9 in (6,093 mm); Crew cab/8' bed: 258.7 in (6,571 mm)
- Width: 80 in (2,032 mm); 95.9 in (2,436 mm) (3500HD DRW)
- Height: 76 in (1,930 mm)

For the first time, the 8.1L big block V8 is no longer offered on the Heavy-Duty models, and no replacement was announced. The 6L90 6-speed automatic transmission is standard on all HD models. The Allison 1000 transmission is paired with the optional Duramax turbo-diesel instead.

For 2011, the HD models were upgraded with a new fully-boxed high-strength steel frame from front to rear improving stiffness by 92 percent with bigger rear springs, larger engine and transmission mounts, and new hydraulic body mounts to improve the ride. The front suspension incorporates new upper and lower control arms and new torsion bars tailored to one of five different gross axle weight ratings. Upper control arms are constructed from forged steel that is both stronger and lighter than the previous arms, while the new lower arms are cast iron to maximize load capacity. Using a unique torsion bar for each gross weight rating allows for better control over vehicle height, resulting in improved handling and better alignment for reduced tire wear. These improvements allow for up to a 6,000-pound front axle weight rating, allowing all 4WD trucks to accommodate a snowplow. The wheelbases were also lengthened by 0.7 inches on pickups and 0.5 inches on chassis-cabs.

Additional front suspension enhancements come from new urethane bump stops, two per side. The upper shock mount has been changed from a single stem mount to a two-bolt design to eliminate the possibility of squeaks and thumps.

The rear suspension design uses asymmetrical leaf springs that are wider and capable of greater load handling. The design features three-inch-wide leaves, with front and rear spring sections of different lengths to reduce the twisting that can result in axle hop and loss of traction. The 2500HD uses a two-stage design with a rating of 6,200 lb (2,812 kg), and 3500HD models have a three-stage design with 7,050 lb (3,198 kg) and 9,375 lb (4,252 kg) ratings on single-wheel and dual-wheel models, respectively.

Also for 2011, the HD series became available with the Denali trim for the GMC Sierra. The 3500HD became available with the Crew Cab Standard Box configuration with single rear wheels, and the 3500HD chassis-cab model became available with the crew cab, riding on a 171.5-inch wheelbase.

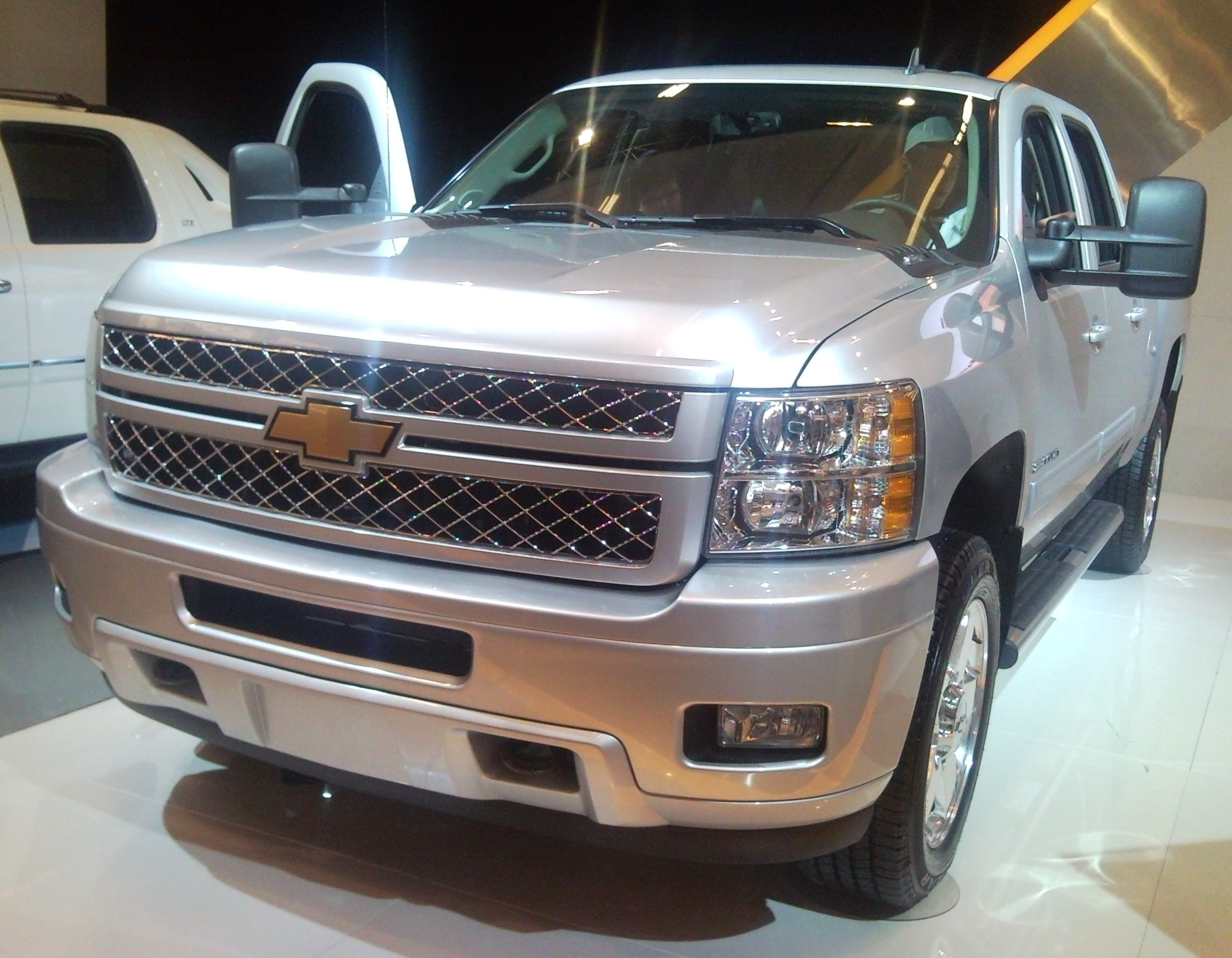
2012 Chevrolet Silverado 2500HD crew cab

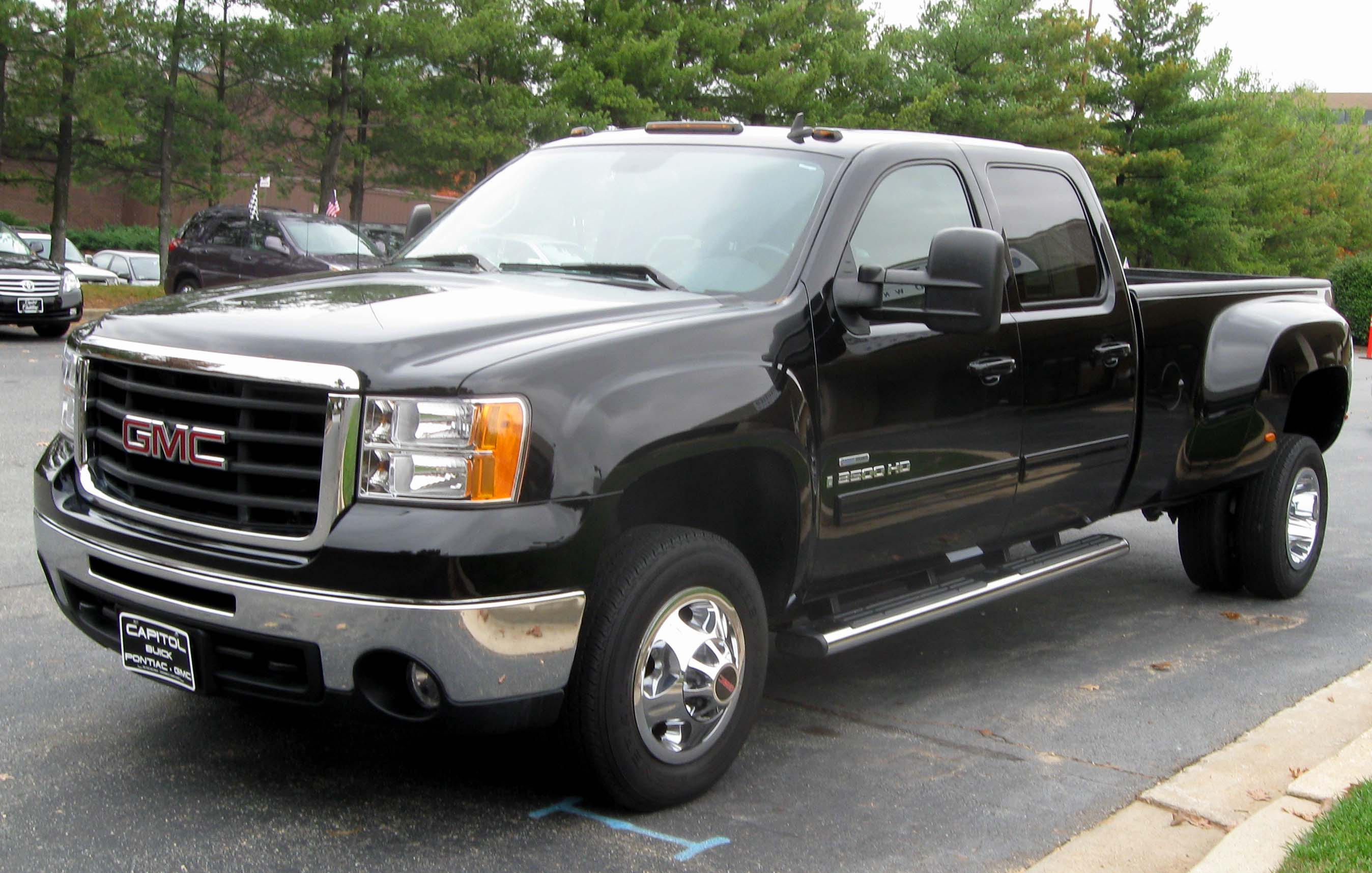
2008 GMC Sierra 3500HD SLT crew cab

== Engines ==
Model	Year	Engine	Power	Torque
1500	2007–2013	4.3 L Vortec 4300 V6	195 hp (145 kW) at 4600 rpm	260 lb⋅ft (353 N⋅m) at 2800 rpm
1500	2007–2008	4.8 L Vortec 4800 V8	295 hp (220 kW) at 5600 rpm	305 lb⋅ft (414 N⋅m) at 4800 rpm
1500	2009	4.8 L Vortec 4800 V8	295 hp (220 kW) at 5600 rpm	305 lb⋅ft (414 N⋅m) at 4600 rpm
1500	2010–2013	4.8 L Vortec 4800 V8	302 hp (225 kW) at 5600 rpm	305 lb⋅ft (414 N⋅m) at 4600 rpm
1500	2007–2009	5.3 L Vortec 5300 V8	315 hp (235 kW) at 5200 rpm	338 lb⋅ft (458 N⋅m) at 4400 rpm
1500	2010–2013	5.3 L Vortec 5300 V8	315 hp (235 kW) at 5300 rpm	335 lb⋅ft (454 N⋅m) at 4400 rpm
1500	2007–2008	6.0 L Vortec 6000 V8	367 hp (274 kW) at 5500 rpm	375 lb⋅ft (508 N⋅m) at 4300 rpm
1500	2009	6.0 L Vortec 6000 V8	367 hp (274 kW) at 5600 rpm	375 lb⋅ft (508 N⋅m) at 4300 rpm
1500	2009–2013	6.2 L Vortec 6200 V8	403 hp (301 kW) at 5700 rpm	417 lb⋅ft (565 N⋅m) at 4300 rpm
2500HD/3500HD	2007–2008	6.0 L Vortec 6000 V8	353 hp (263 kW) at 5400 rpm	373 lb⋅ft (506 N⋅m) at 4400 rpm
2500HD/3500HD	2009–2014	6.0 L Vortec 6000 V8	360 hp (268 kW) at 5400 rpm	380 lb⋅ft (515 N⋅m) at 4200 rpm
2500HD/3500HD	2007	6.6 L Duramax V8	360 hp (268 kW) at 3200 rpm	650 lb⋅ft (881 N⋅m) at 1600 rpm
2500HD/3500HD	2007–2010	6.6 L Duramax V8	365 hp (272 kW) at 3200 rpm	660 lb⋅ft (895 N⋅m) at 1600 rpm
2500HD/3500HD	2011–2014	6.6 L Duramax V8	397 hp (296 kW) at 3000 rpm	765 lb⋅ft (1,037 N⋅m) at 1600 rpm
Silverado XFE	2009	6.0 L Vortec 6000 V8	332 hp (248 kW) at 5100 rpm	367 lb⋅ft (498 N⋅m) at 4100 rpm
Silverado Hybrid	2009–2013	6.0 L Vortec 6000 V8	332 hp (248 kW) at 5100 rpm	367 lb⋅ft (498 N⋅m) at 4100 rpm

== Safety ==
The Silverado comes standard with four-wheel ABS. StabiliTrak and side curtain airbags are optional on certain trim levels.

2007 NHTSA crash test:

- Frontal Driver:
- Frontal Passenger:
- Side Driver:
- Side Rear Passenger:
- Rollover:

The IIHS gave the Silverado a "Good" score in their frontal crash test. The 2007-09 models equipped with or without optional side curtain airbags received a "Poor" rating in the side impact test. For 2010, the side structure was strengthened, side torso airbags were added, and side airbags became standard leading to the IIHS side impact overall rating improving to "Acceptable" and the overall side structure rating improved from "Poor" to "Acceptable." The crew cab variant of the 2011–13 Silverado is also rated "Marginal" in the IIHS roof strength test.

== Electric version ==
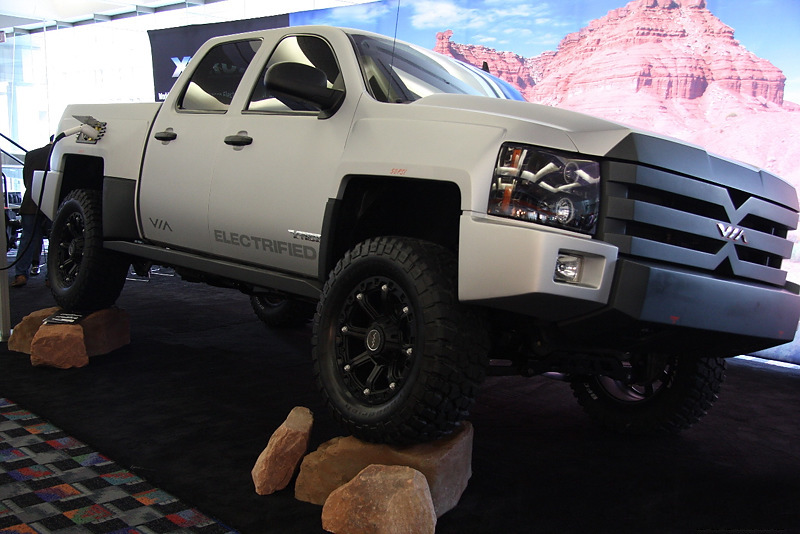
2013 VIA VTRUX

In 2011, the developer of the Chevrolet Volt and former vice chairman Bob Lutz joined VIA Motors in developing electric versions of the Chevrolet Silverado/GMC Sierra called the VIA VTrux.

See also: Chevrolet Silverado EV
