= Plis =

Plis, PLIS, may refer to:

- Qeleshe (qylat, plis), an Albanian white brimless felt cap hat
- Andrzej Pliś (1929–1991), Polish mathematician
- Renata Pliś (born 1985), Polish middle-distance runner
- "plis" (song), a 2024 single by Camilo off the EP un; see Camilo discography
- Parks of supra-municipal interest (PLIS; Italian: parco locale di interesse sovracomunale); see Alto Milanese

== See also ==
- Pileus (hat), brimless felt cap hat
- PLSS (disambiguation)
- PLS (disambiguation)
- PLI (disambiguation), for the singular of PLIs
