= PLI =

PLI or pli may refer to:

== Companies and organizations ==
- Pascual Liner Inc., a transport company in the Philippines
- Perpetual Income & Growth Investment Trust (LSE: PLI)
- Practising Law Institute
- Portland–Lewiston Interurban, a former railroad subsidiary in Maine, US

=== Politics ===
- Independent Liberal Party (Nicaragua) (Partido Liberal Independiente)
- Italian Liberal Party (Partito Liberale Italiano)
- Italian Liberal Party (1997)

== Science and technology ==
- PL/I (Programming Language One), a programming language
- PLI (gene)
- Private Line Interface, part of ARPANET encryption devices
- Program Language Interface, in Verilog
  - Verilog Procedural Interface or PLI 2

== Other uses ==
- Performance-linked incentives
- Pragmatic language impairment
- Pli: the Warwick Journal of Philosophy, published by the Department of Philosophy, University of Warwick, UK
- Professional liability insurance
- Pali (ISO 639:pli), a language

== See also ==
- Ply (disambiguation)
- Pli selon pli (Fold by fold), a 1960 classical piece by French composer Pierre Boulez
