= PLS =

PLS or Pls may refer to:

== Organizations ==
- Pioneer Library System, Oklahoma, US
- Poculi Ludique Societas, Medieval & Renaissance Players of Toronto, Canada
- Profesjonalna Liga Siatkówki, Polish Volleyball League
- Premier League Soccer, an Indian football league
- Prometheus Light and Sound, US home PBX company, 1990s
- Pilbara Minerals Ltd, an Australian ASX-listed lithium mining company.

== Science and technology ==
- Palomar–Leiden survey of minor planets
- Partial least squares regression, a statistical method
- Plasma spectrometer, an instrument aboard the Voyager 1 and 2 space probes
- Pregnant leach solution, a mining process

== Computers ==
- PLS (complexity), a complexity class
- PLS (file format), multimedia playlist format
- Pronunciation Lexicon Specification, for interoperable pronunciation information
- Super PLS, a Samsung IPS panel technology
- IBM PL/S, a systems programming language
- Rand RL/S, Rand Corporation's version of IBM's PL/S

== Medicine and biology ==
- Papillon–Lefèvre syndrome, a disease affecting the teeth and skin
- Plastin (PLS)
- Primary lateral sclerosis, a disease characterized by weakness
- Proteus-like syndrome, similar to Proteus syndrome
- Polish Lowland Sheepdog

== Transportation ==
- Palletized load system, U.S. Army logistics system
- Providenciales International Airport, Turks and Caicos Islands, IATA code
- Pleasington railway station, England, station code

== Other ==
- PLS on Post, a restaurant in San Francisco, California, U.S.
- Profit and loss sharing, a concept in Islamic finance similar to equity financing
- Public Land Strip, former name for the Oklahoma Panhandle
- Texting shorthand for "please"

== See also ==
- Plis (disambiguation)
- Please (disambiguation)
- PLSS (disambiguation)
- PL (disambiguation), for the singular of PLs
