= Palletized Load System =

Palletized Load System (PLS)
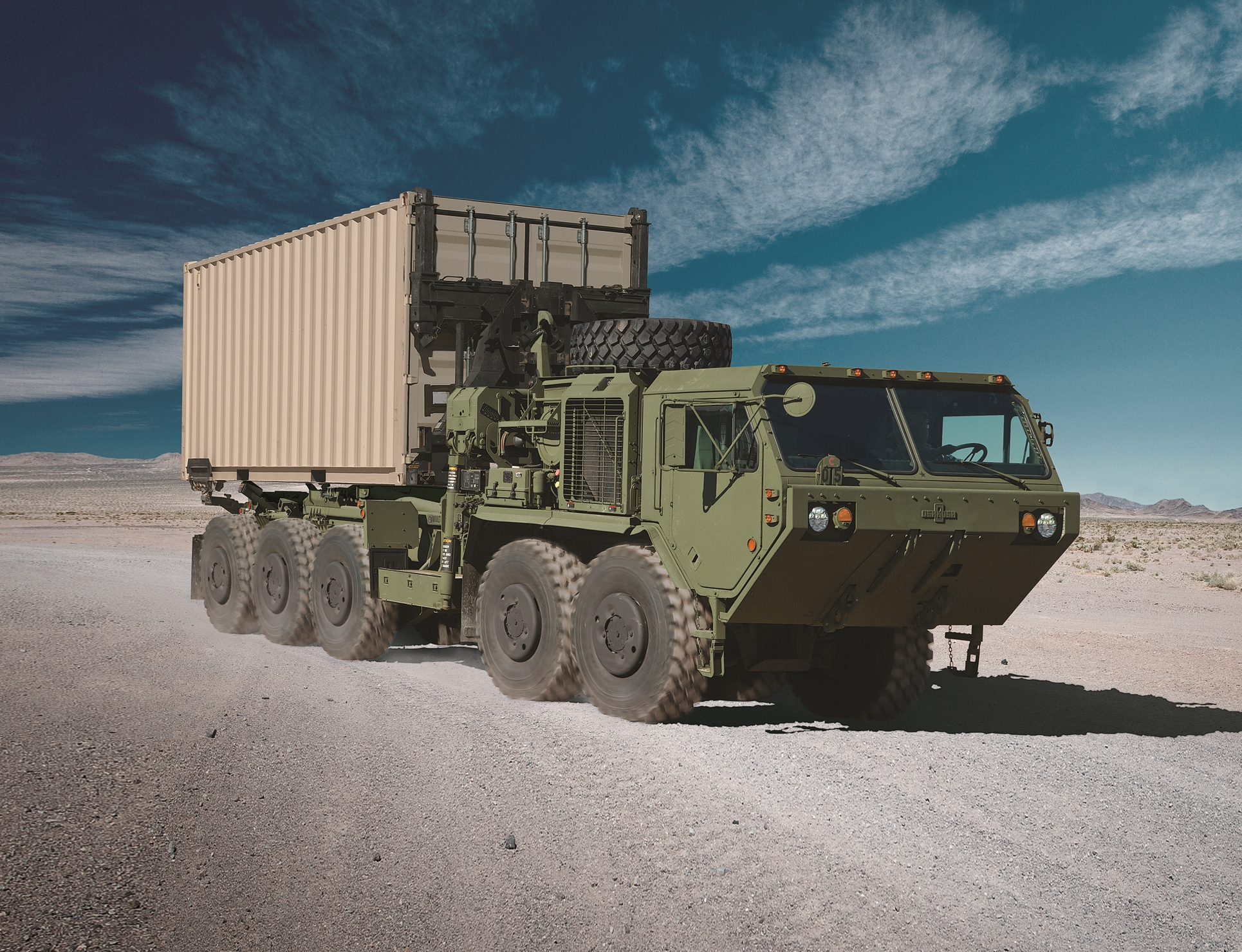
- Oshkosh M1074A1 Palletized Load System (PLS) truck in B-kit configuration and with an Oshkosh Container Handling Unit (CHU)
- Type: 10×10 heavy tactical truck
- Place of origin: United States

Service history
- In service: 1993–present
- Used by: U.S. Army, Israel, Jordan and Turkey

Production history
- Designer: Oshkosh Corporation
- Designed: 1989
- Manufacturer: Oshkosh Corporation
- Produced: 1992–present
- No. built: 6288 PLA A0 and >2150 PLS A1 (A1 figure includes A0 Recap to A1 standard), plus > 15,000 PLS trailers
- Variants: M1074A0, M1075A0, M1074A1, M1075A1

Specifications (M1075A1)
- Mass: 24,040 kg (unladen with flatrack); 39,009 kg (GVWR); 61,462 kg (GCWR)
- Length: 10.795 m (35 ft 5 in)
- Width: 2.517 m (8 ft 3 in)
- Height: 3.277 m (10 ft 9 in) (LHS hook)
- Crew: 2
- Armor: a-kit/b-kit; U.S. Army Long Term Armor Strategy (LTAS) compliant
- Engine: Caterpillar (CAT) C15, 15.2-liter, 6-cylinder inline water-cooled diesel 600 hp (450 kW)
- Payload capacity: 14,965 kg (16.5 tons) on flatrack
- Transmission: Allison 4500SP 5-speed automatic with Oshkosh 36000 Series 2 speed transfer case
- Suspension: Oshkosh TAK-4 fully independent coil on axles 1 and 2, Hendrickson RT-400 walking beam on axles 4 and 5, rear Hendrickson-Turner air ride suspension on mid-axle (3rd)
- Maximum speed: 62 mph (100 km/h)
- Steering system: Power-assisted on front tandem

The Palletized Load System (PLS) is a truck-based logistics system that entered service in the United States Army in 1993. It performs long and short distance freight transport, unit resupply, and other missions in the tactical environment to support modernized and highly mobile combat units. It provides rapid movement of combat configured loads of ammunition and all classes of supply, shelters and intermodal containers. It is similar to systems such as the British Demountable Rack Offload and Pickup System (DROPS).

== History ==
In January 1989, the United States Army Tank Automotive Command awarded prototype PLS contracts to Oshkosh Truck Corporation, the PACCAR Government Group and General Motors, Military Vehicle Operations, with each contractor to deliver nine trucks, six trailers, and 30 flatracks for prototype hardware testing which began in September 1989. Oshkosh Truck Corporation was awarded a five-year contract for PLS in September 1990, with production commencing in 1992.

The original contract award was for 2626 PLS trucks, 1050 M1076 PLS trailers, and 11,030 M1077 PLS flat racks. Under the initial PLS contract, between 1992–1997 Oshkosh delivered 2905 PLS trucks and 1534 PLS trailers. Around half of the PLS trucks were fitted with a Grove material handling crane and were designated M1074. PLS without the crane are designated M1075. Under an additional add-on contract from 1997 to 2001, Oshkosh produced 595 PLS trucks and 800 trailers, bringing the PLS fleet to 3,500 trucks and 2,334 trailers.

In March 2001, Oshkosh Truck was awarded the Family of Heavy Tactical Vehicles (FHTV) contract. The FHTV award differed in that in addition to the provision for up to 740 PLS trucks and 1060 PLS trailers, the award covered deliveries of Oshkosh Heavy Expanded Mobility Tactical Truck (HEMTT) and Heavy Equipment Transporter (HET). The FHTV contract was extended twice, following which FHTV 2 was awarded to Oshkosh Truck. In October 2008 FHTV 3 was awarded to Oshkosh Defense. As part of the FHTV 3 contract, Oshkosh commenced deliveries of PLS in A1 configuration. In December 2009 the last of 6,288 production PLS A0 was delivered.

Oshkosh announced in January 2012 that it had been awarded a bridge contract by the U.S. Army to continue FHTV production. Under this extended contract, the government could place orders through October 2013 and Oshkosh Defense could deliver through September 2014.

In July 2013 the U.S. Army released a synopsis for a FHTV 4 award. This stated the government intended to award the FHTV 4 contract on a sole-source basis to Oshkosh Corporation, and it is understood that the aim was to ensure negotiations with Oshkosh for FHTV 4 were concluded in time to ensure there was no break in production between FHTV 3 and FHTV 4 production and deliveries. There would be a break of seven months. FHTV 4 was awarded to Oshkosh Defense in June 2015 as a five-year requirements contract worth a potential USD780 million. At this time the FHTV IV award covered an estimated 1,800 FHTVs and in addition to Recapitalized (Recap'd) PLS covered Recap'd HEMTT and also included the production of approximately 1,000 new production PLSTs. PLSs accounted for about 25% of the Recap potential.

In March 2020 the final FHTV 4 award was announced by Oshkosh, this calling for an undisclosed quantity of U.S. Army and U.S. Army Reserve FHTVs to be Recap'd. Quantities/breakdown have been revealed. Contract value was USD346.4 million, with deliveries scheduled to conclude in December 2021. As of the award date, Oshkosh disclosed that since 1995 the company had rebuilt over 3,400 PLS trucks. On 3 May 2021 the U.S. Army announced that it had awarded Oshkosh Defense a three-year extension to the FHTV 4 contract. Under the extension, Oshkosh provided new and Recap'd PLS trucks and trailers, HEMTTs, and HETs. The initial delivery orders under the extension called for a total of 353 new and recapitalized vehicles, with the final known orders placed in June 2024, these valued at $231.9 million for trucks, kits and kit installs. In total, Oshkosh is known to have received four FHTV 4 orders during 2024.

In August 2024 Oshkosh Defense LLC announced that U.S. Army Contracting Command – Detroit Arsenal (ACC-DTA) had awarded the company a five-year, Fixed Price with Economic Price Adjustment Requirements contract for the Family of Heavy Tactical Vehicles (FHTV) V (5) program. Based on evaluated quantities, the requirements-type contract is estimated at $1.54 billion and allows Oshkosh to continue delivering new and recapitalized trucks and associated trailers into 2031. The Army was able to purchase under FHTV 5 from August 2024. The first known purchase under FHTV 5 was announced in April 2025, this $95 million order calling for an undisclosed quantity of autonomy-ready Palletized Load Systems A2. It was not stated if these PLS A2 formed part of the Expedient Leader Follower (ExLF) program.

Reset and Recapitalization: Reset and Recapitalization are formal U.S. Army programs that refurbish and return equipment to service in as new condition. Since the award of two separate contracts in 2004, Oshkosh (in addition to HEMTTS and HETs) has rebuilt/overhauled service-worn PLS trucks to new build standard under the Reset and Recapitalization programs. The completed vehicles are stripped to the chassis frame rails from the process and are returned to service in zero miles/zero hours condition and with a new vehicle warranty. The Reset process returns trucks to original build standard (for example PLSA0 to PLSA0), with the exception of certain safety-related items. Recapitalized vehicles are completely rebuilt to meet the current build standard specifications and at a cost to the US DoD per vehicle of about 75% of new build (for example PLSA0 to PLSA1). The first A0 PLS were Recap’d to A1 standard in March 2012. In addition to Reset and Recap, Oshkosh has also refurbished PLS through the Theatre-Provided Equipment Refurbishment (TPER) program.

Expedient Leader Follower (ExLF) program On 27 June 2018, Oshkosh announced that the US army's Tank Automotive Research, Development, and Engineering Center (TARDEC) had awarded the company a USD49 million contract to integrate existing PLS trucks with scalable autonomous technology as part of the army's Expedient Leader Follower (ExLF) program. The ExLF program addresses the needs of the Leader Follower Directed Requirement and Program of Record by removing soldiers from the vehicle while operating in highly contested areas. Under the contract, Oshkosh will integrate an initial 70 autonomy kits for Program Development and Operational Technical Demonstrations (OTD). The contract holds an option to procure up to 150 autonomy kits.

Common Tactical Truck (CTT); previously Next Generation Future Truck (NGFT) Parallel to the FHTV 4 extension effort, the U.S. Army’s Heavy Tactical Vehicles (HTV) PEO CS&CSS issued on 20 July 2020 Notice ID W56HZV-20-R-0237, a Request for Information (RfI) for the Next Generation Future Truck (NGFT). Responses were due by 24 August 2020 for what was quickly renamed the Common Tactical Truck (CTT). It was then the stated intent that CTT would replace the PLSA1, plus the HEMTT and M915 Truck Tractor, Line Haul. The Army desired five variants of the NGFT/CTT, and all with the option to perform semi-autonomous or autonomous operations. The five variants muted were: a wrecker to recover Stryker, MRAPs, and other tactical wheeled vehicles up to 40 US tons; an LHS Heavy variant with crane to transport flatrack with up to 16 tons of cargo payload; a Tractor variant operable with the M870, M871, M172, M872, M967 tanker, M1062 tanker, future tanker (8,200 gallons), and commercial standard trailers; a Tanker variant with a 2,500 gallon threshold or objective fuel payload greater than 2,500 gallons; and a Cargo variant with crane capable of carrying a payload of up to 22 tons or greater.

By early 2025, the program had progressed and August and September 2024 an operational demonstration to assess prototype designs had taken place. Back in April 2024. The actual demonstration involved 12 prototypes supplied by American Rheinmetall Vehicles, Mack Defense, Navistar Defense, and Oshkosh Defense. Wording related to CTT had revised by this time and the program is now referred to as a next-generation family of vehicles (FoV) by the Army, and one that seeks to replace existing platforms such as the PLS, HEMTT, and other medium- and heavy-duty transport vehicles. The CTT FoV is now stated to feature a specialized range variants that will include cargo and LHS, off-road and line-haul tractors, tankers, and base platforms capable of supporting air defense systems, and bridging and boat transport/handling. Data collected from the operational demonstration will be used by the Army to refine CTT's Capability Development Document (CDD) for the CTT, and following some limited additional testing CTT is scheduled to transition to a major capability acquisition program at Milestone C (MS C) in Fiscal Year 2028. The Army then plans to commence low-rate initial production (LRIP), with the longer term objective being to procure 7,217 CTTs by FY2035. A single vendor will be selected for production through an open competition that is scheduled to commence FY2026.

== Components ==
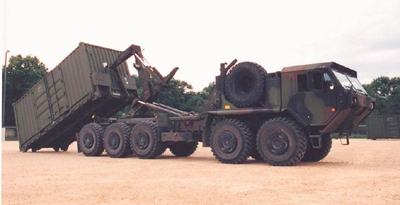
An early Oshkosh M1075A0 PLS truck

The Palletized Load System (PLS) is based around two variants of prime mover truck (M1074 and M1075) fitted with an integral self-loading and unloading capability, a trailer (M1076), and demountable cargo beds, referred to as flatracks. PLS trucks and trailers are air-transportable in C-5A and C-17 cargo aircraft.

=== Truck ===
The PLS prime mover truck carries its payloads on its demountable flatrack cargo beds, or inside 8×8×20 foot International Organization for Standardization (ISO) intermodal containers, or shelters. The M1074 is equipped with a variable reach material handling crane (MHC), the M1075 is not. A dp Manufacturing PLS-22K self-recovery winch with a capacity of 9,072 kg is an option on both the M1074 and M1075.

The Oshkosh PLS truck is based on a C-section chassis formed of 356 × 89 × 9.5 mm SAE 1027 modified heat-treated carbon manganese steel with a yield strength of 758 MPa. Bolted construction with Grade 8 bolts is used throughout. PLS is unusual in that it is a five-axle truck, with two front and three rear axles, and with steering on the rear (5th) and front axle pair. A five-axle (10 × 10) configuration was selected by Oshkosh as it provides optimum turning capability and good weight distribution between all axles providing mobility and capability above the desired level of the U.S. Army specification. Competing PLS designs were both four-axle (8x8s), the Paccar offering having a single front axle and rear tridem, the General Motors offering was an Americanised MAN KAT1 (8×8).

PLS A1 variants are powered by a Caterpillar C-15 four-stroke diesel developing 600 hp, this coupled to an Allison 4500SP six-speed automatic transmission, and Oshkosh 36000 Series two-speed transfer case. The original PLS was powered by a Detroit Diesel 8V92TA V-8 two-stroke diesel developing 500 hp, with later production examples having the electronically controlled DDECIV version of this engine. Original PLS were fitted with an Allison CLT-755 ATEC 5F/1R automatic transmission and Oshkosh 55000 two-speed transfer box. After October 2005, an Allison HD-4500 Generation 4 six-speed automatic transmission was fitted.

All PLS variants have the same rear tridem unit which consists of a single Hendrickson-Turner air-sprung drive axle (3rd axle) and a Hendrickson RT-400 leaf-sprung AxleTech tandem (4th and 5th axles) on which the rearmost axle contra-steers. On PLS A1 variants the front AxleTech/Oshkosh axles are sprung using Oshkosh's TAK-4 fully independent coil spring suspension. The original PLS had a pair of rigid AxleTech front axles, these with leaf springs.

Tires are Michelin 1600R 20. Current fit is Michelin XZL, earlier PLS were fitted Michelin XL. A central tire inflation system (CTIS) is fitted, this having four settings - HWY (highway) • CC (cross-country) • MSS (mud sand snow) • EMERG (emergency). A spare wheel and tire is mounted behind the cab on A0 variants. On A1 variants the spare wheel and tire is located on the right-hand side of the vehicle, on the top of the engine/cooling compartments.

The two-seat forward control cab is a development of the original Oshkosh M977 HEMTT cab. The PLS A1 (and HEMTT A4)has a visually similar, but slightly larger, revised cab. An add-on armor kit has been developed for the M1074/M1075 by Armor Holdings Inc. PLS A1's cab is compliant with the U.S. Army's Long Term Armor Strategy (LTAS) requirements of an A- and B-kit armoring philosophy. Additionally, it comes as standard with integrated floor armor.

=== Trailer ===
The M1076 is a three-axle dolly-type trailer. It is capable of carrying the same 16.5 short ton payload as the prime mover. Flatracks can be on- and off-loaded from the trailer by the prime mover's load handling system. Without leaving the cab, the driver can load or unload the truck in less than one minute, and both truck and trailer in less than five minutes. The M1076 can be towed by M1074 and M1075 PLS trucks.

=== Flatrack ===
Three types of flatrack have been procured as part of the system, the M1077/M1077A1, the M3/M3A1 and the M1 ISO Compatible Flatrack. The M1077 and M1077A1 General Purpose A-frame flatracks are sideless flatracks used to transport pallets of ammunition and other classes of supplies. On the ISO-compatible Palletized Flatrack (IPF) Type M1 there are two end walls, one incorporating the A-frame. Both walls can fold down inwardly for stacking when empty. The M3/M3A1 Container Roll-in/Out Platform (CROP) is, a flatrack that fits inside a 20 ft (6.1 m) ISO container.

=== Container Handling Unit ===
The Container Handling Unit (CHU) is an add-on kit that allows for the loading/unloading and transport of standard 20 ft (6.1 m) ISO containers without the need for an intermediate flatrack. M1075 PLS trucks (with or without winch) can have an integral CHU stowage facility between the LHS hook arm and engine. CHUs were procured as part of the original FHTV contract. Weight of the complete CHU is 1746 kg. Installation time is 80 man hours. Oshkosh produced the original CHU, the current E-CHU (E - Enhanced) is manufactured by GT Machining & Fabricating Ltd of Canada. Order totals for CHU/E-CHU are at least 6300 units.

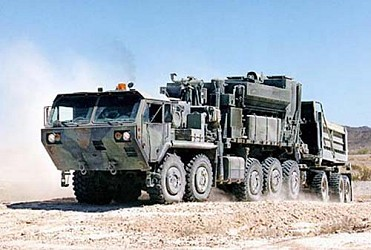
PLS M1075A0 truck laden with Engineer Mission Modules (EMM); M5 Concrete Mobile Mixer (EMM-CMM) on the truck, and M6 Dump Body (EMM-DB) on the M1076 trailer

=== Engineer Mission Modules ===
Engineer Mission Modules (EMM) components are flatrack-based and designed to be used on M1075 PLS trucks fitted with the Universal Power Interface Kit (UPIK). Three EMMs were procured under the initial FHTV contract, the M4 Bituminous Distributor (EMM-BD), the M5 Concrete Mobile Mixer (EMM-CMM), and the M6 Dump Body (EMM-DB). The M4 EMM-BD provides the capability to spread measured amounts of bituminous material for road preparation, repair, and other engineer applications. The M5 EMM CMM transports raw concrete materials, mixes concrete as needed, and emplaces the mixed concrete. The M6 EMM-DB transports and spreads engineering construction material such as rocks, gravel, sand, and soil. A water Distributor also now in service, this placed under contract in 2009.

Flat racks and CHU/E-CHU are interchangeable between PLS and the HEMTT-LHS. Also interchangeable between PLS and HEMTT LHS are Modular Fuel System (MFS) and Hippo (water) tankracks, and the Forward Repair System (FRS). a PLS version optimized for the transport and handling of WFEL Heavy Dry Support Bridge (HDSB) components is also in service. The DSB launch vehicle is a modified PLS truck.

PLS is a major enabler of the Army's drive to achieve a distribution-based logistics system. The PLS-Enhanced (PLS-E) program procures the Movement Tracking System, which provides a multitude of tactical wheeled vehicles with Global Positioning System capability and two-way digital messaging. The MTS enables the commander to track logistics assets over the range of the battle space. The two-way messaging allows redirection of logistics assets as needs develop.

== Manufacturer ==
- M1074A0/A1, M1075A0/A1 trucks, M1076 trailer and Container Handling Unit (CHU) - Oshkosh Corporation, Oshkosh, Wisconsin
- Multilift Mk5/MPH165-LHS load handling system - Oshkosh Corporation, Oshkosh, Wisconsin (licensed from Hiab)
- Enhanced Container Handling Unit (E-CHU) - GT Machining & Fabricating Ltd, Canada
- M3/M3A1 CROP flat rack - AAR (previously Summa Technologies), Huntsville, Alabama; Hyundai Precision America, San Diego, California)
- M4 Bituminous Distributor (EMM-BD) and Water Distributor - E.D. Etnyre, Oregon, Illinois
- M5 Concrete Mobile Mixer (EMM CMM) - Cemen Tech Inc., Indianola, Indiana
- M6 Dump Body (EMM-DB) - Crysteel Manufacturing, Lake Crystal, Minnesota

== Operators ==
- Israel
- Jordan
- Turkey
- United States
- Morocco

== Gallery ==
Palletized Load System (PLS)

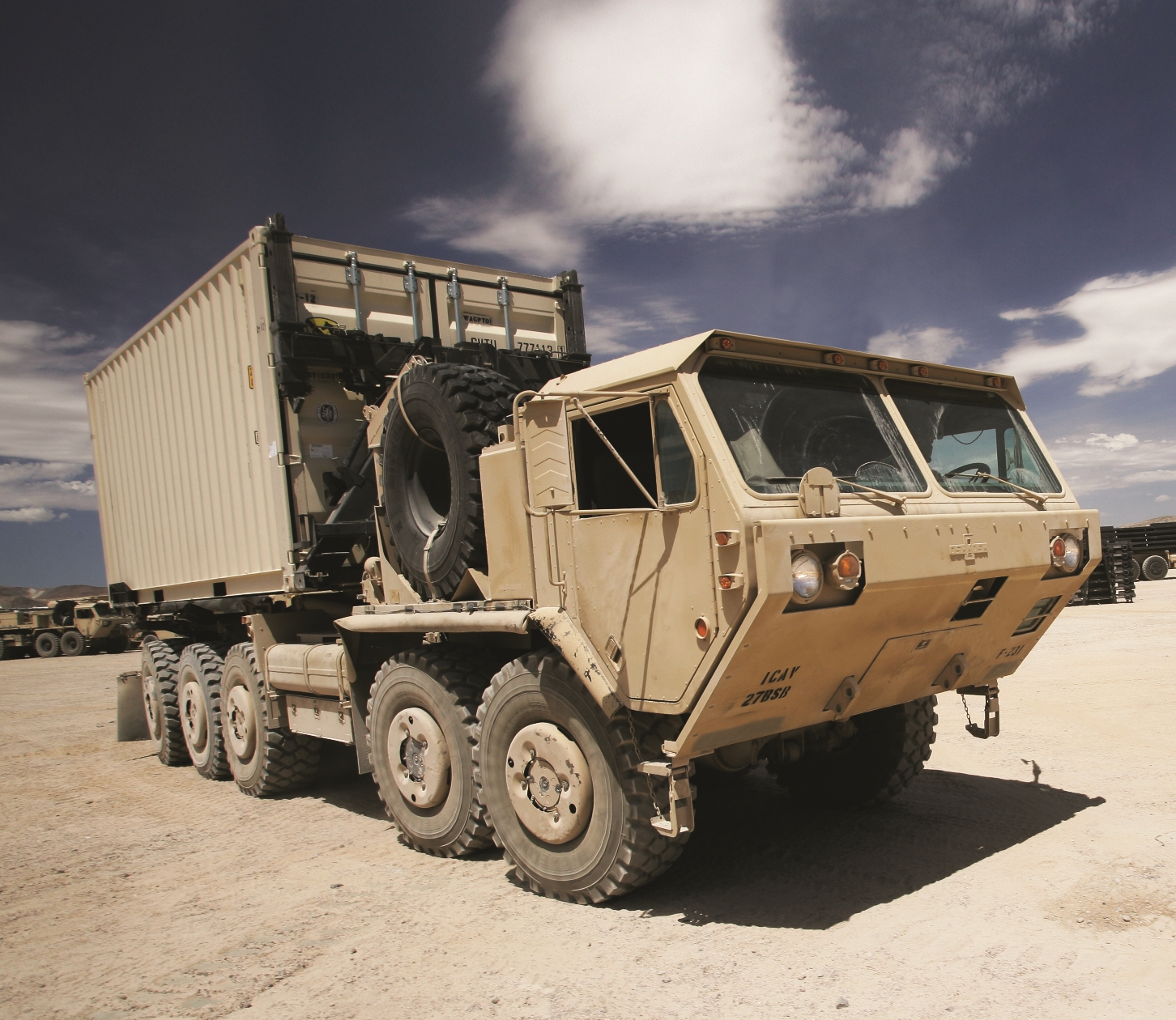
Oshkosh M1075A0 PLS with Oshkosh CHU

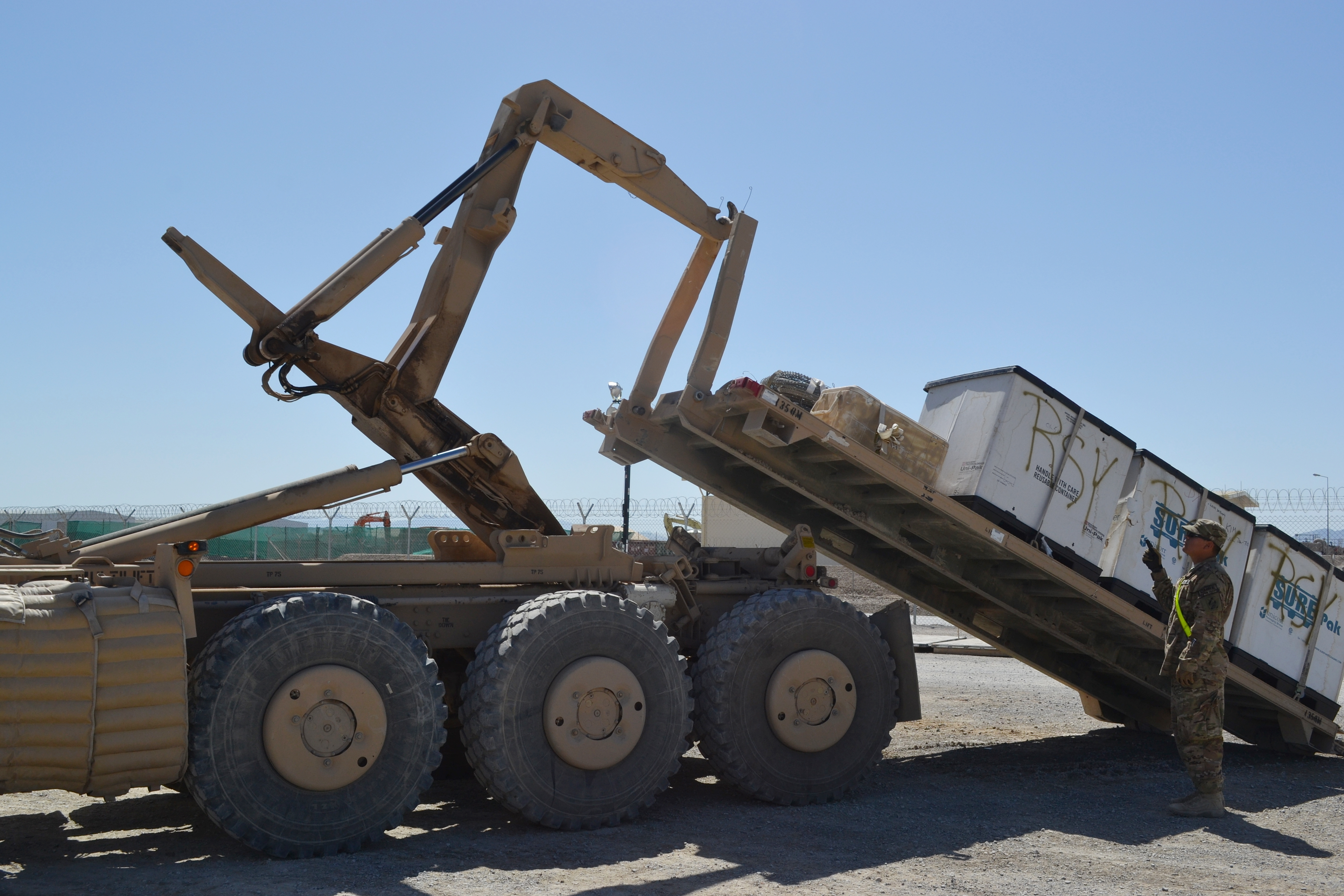
Rear tridem and LHS detail of M1075A0 PLS

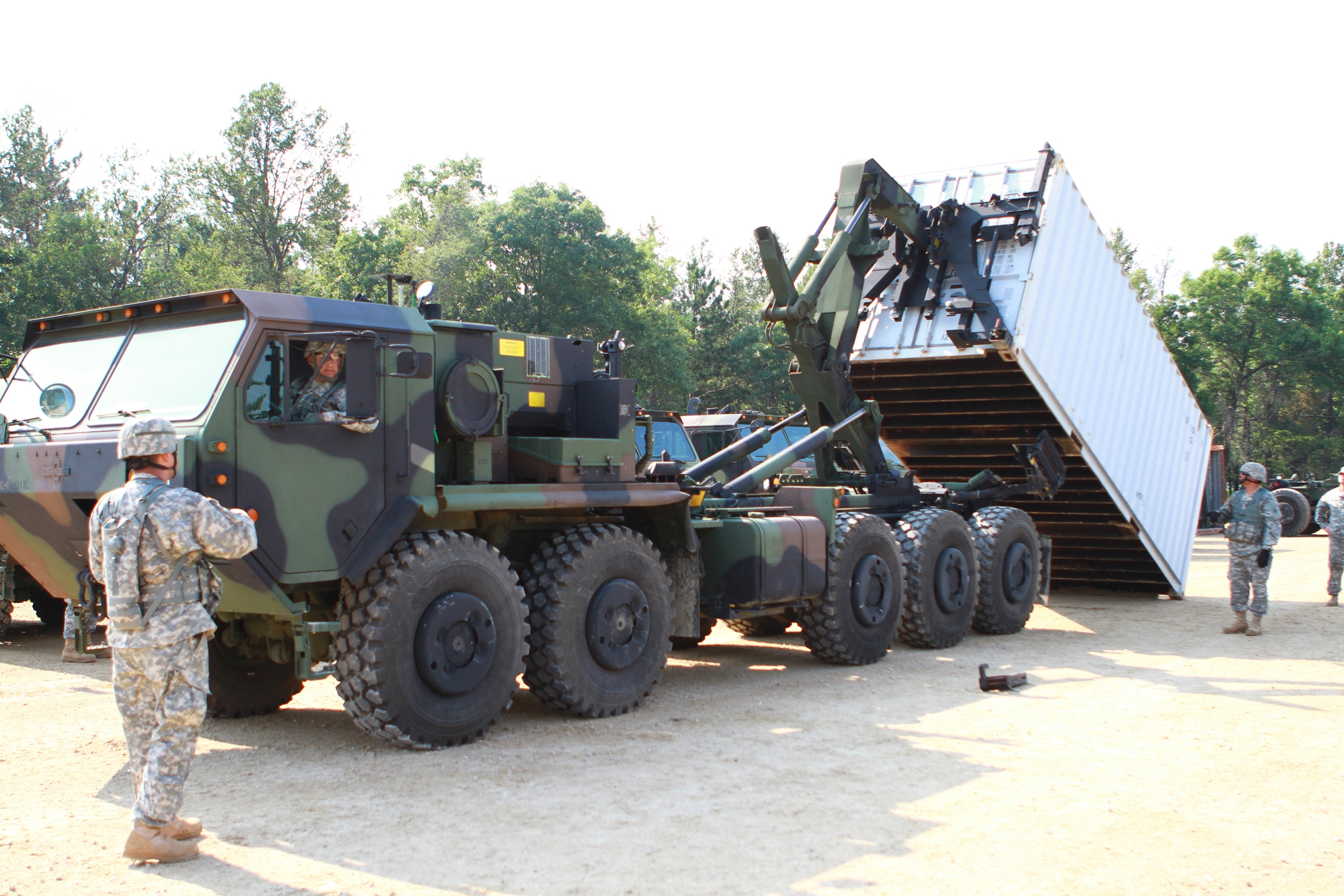
Oshkosh M1075A0 PLS truck showing the LHS and CHU

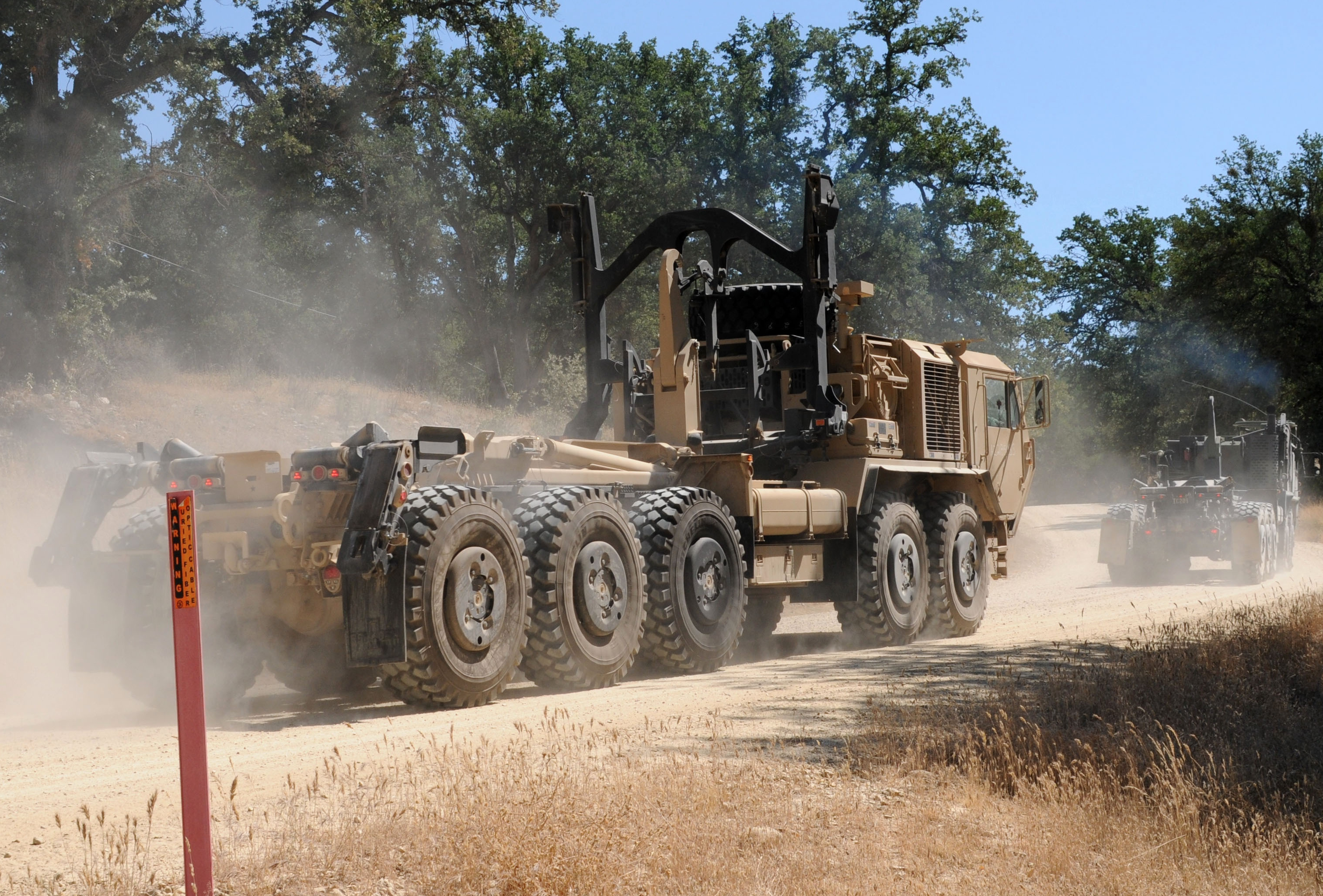
Oshkosh M1075A0 PLS with the current E-CHU

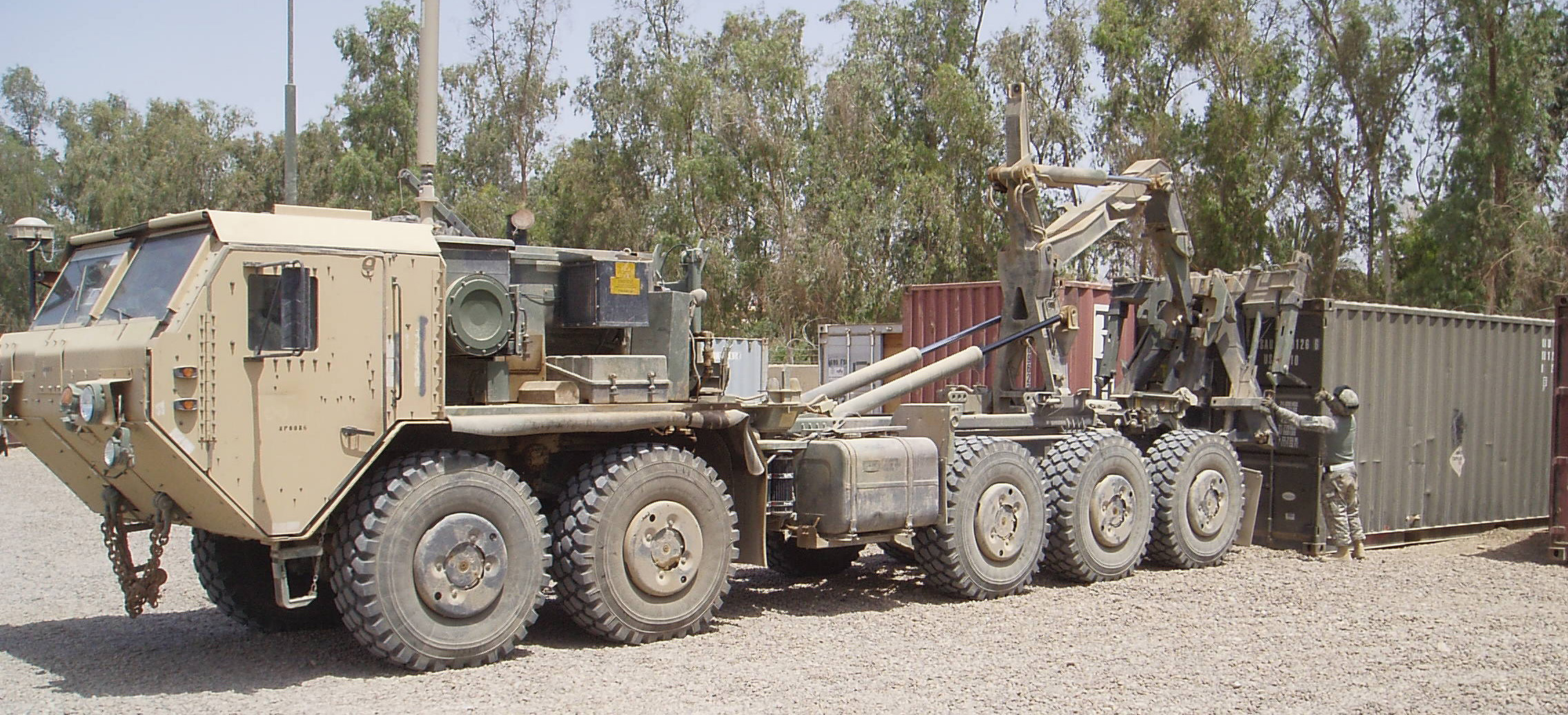
Oshkosh M1075A0 PLS truck fitted with the Armor Holdings developed protection package

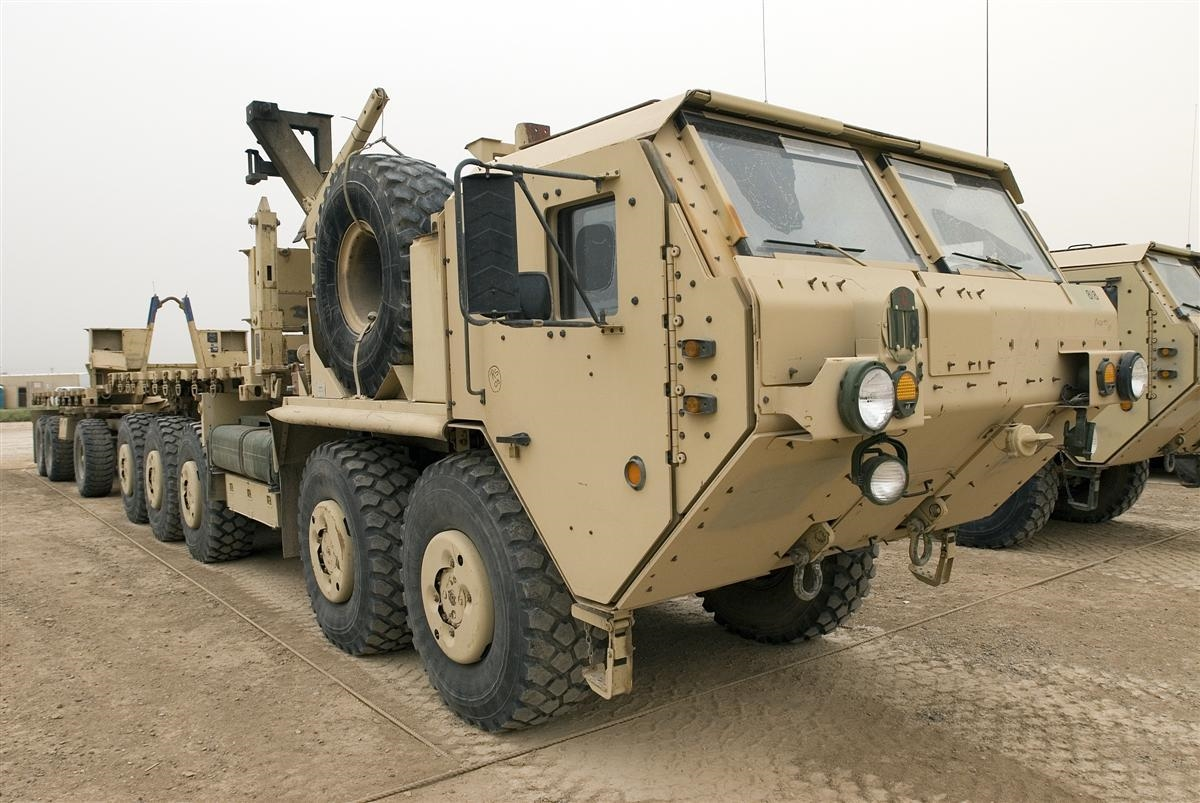
Oshkosh M1075A0 PLS truck with M1076 PLS trailer (Armor Holdings developed protection package)

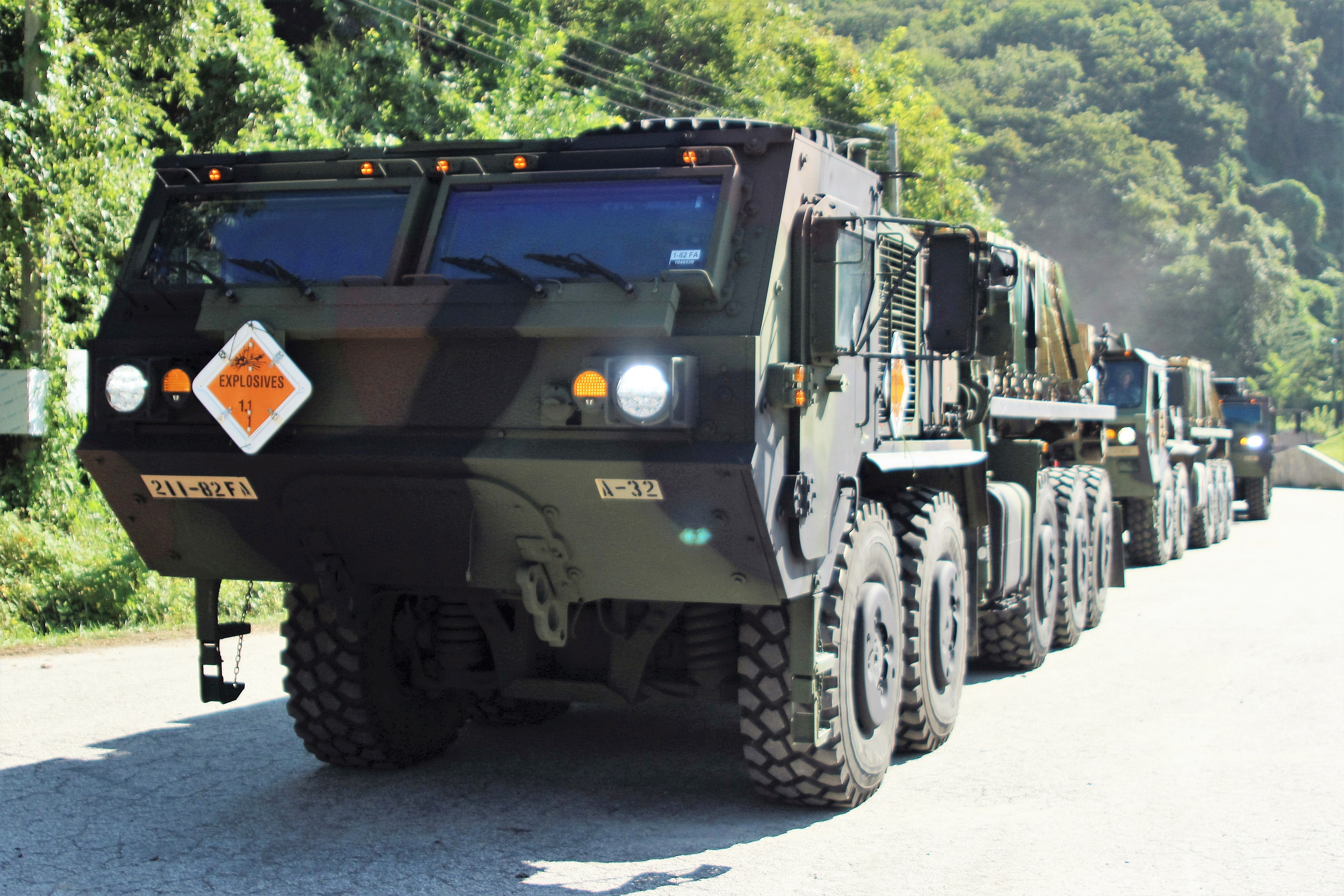
Oshkosh M1075A1 PLS with armored cab (A-kit); the truck behind is B-kit - unarmored

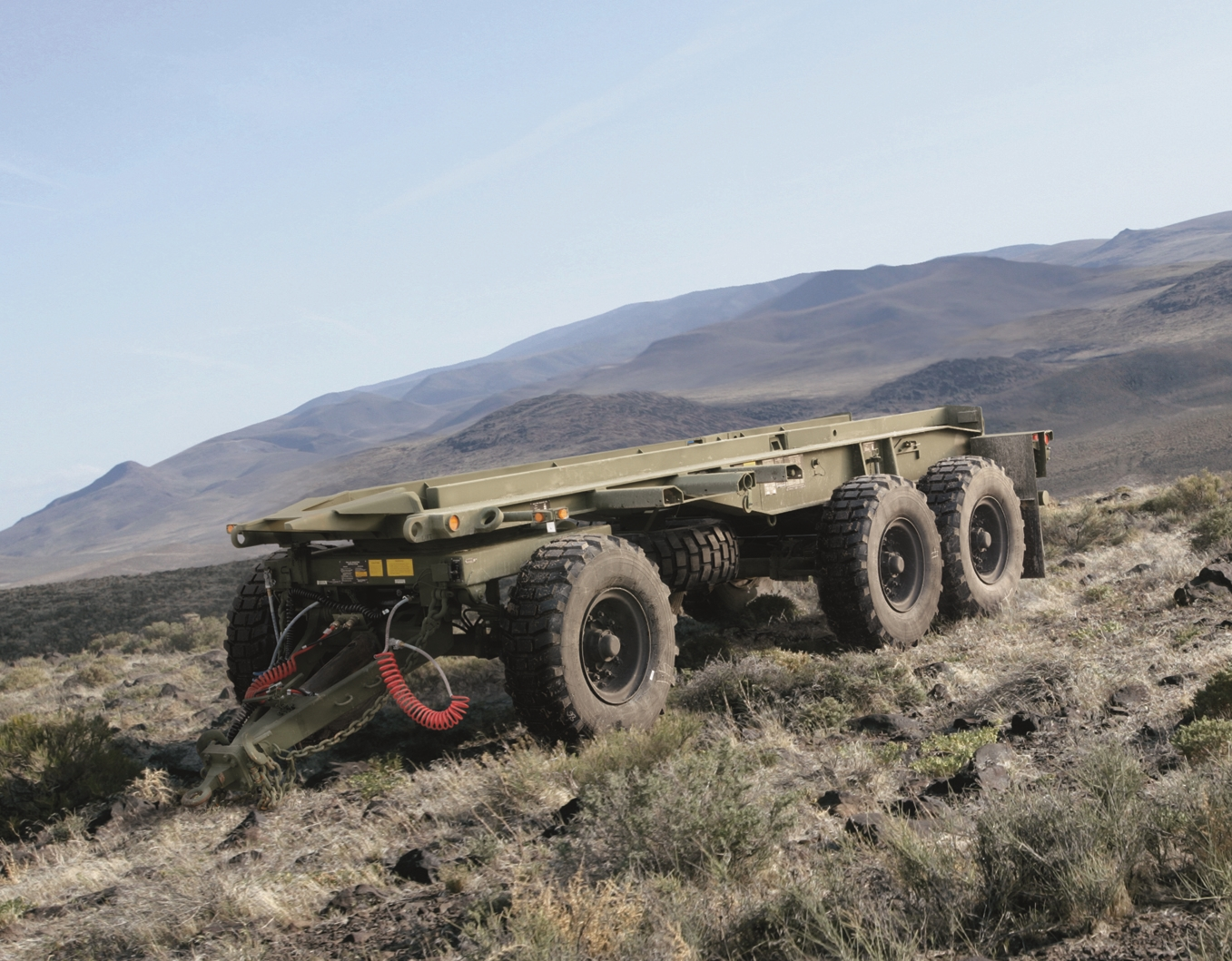
Oshkosh-produced M1076 PLS trailer

== See also ==
- Demountable Rack Offload and Pickup System
- Heavy Equipment Transport System
- Heavy Expanded Mobility Tactical Truck
- List of U.S. military vehicles by model number
- List of United States Army tactical truck engines
- Logistic Vehicle System Replacement
- Logistics Vehicle System
