= Logistics Vehicle System Replacement =

United States Marine Corps tactical trucks

Logistic Vehicle System Replacement (LVSR)
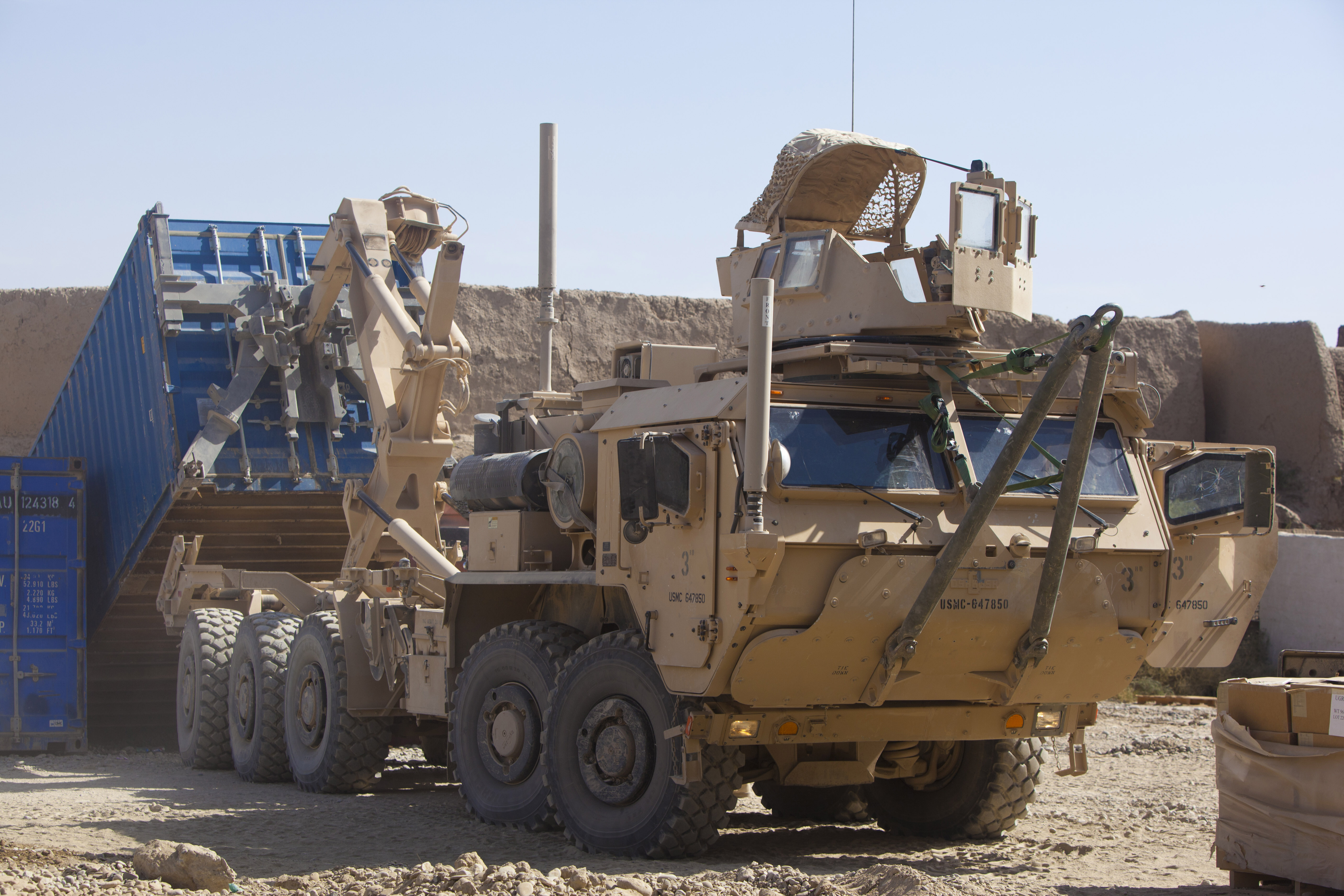
- U.S. Marine Corps Oshkosh Logistic Vehicle System Replacement (LVSR)
- Type: 10x10 tactical trucks with up to 16.5 / 22.5 ton off-road / on-road payload (MKR18 cargo)
- Place of origin: United States of America

Service history
- In service: 2009–present (first fielding 2009)
- Used by: U.S. Marines

Production history
- Designer: Oshkosh
- Designed: March 2004 (LVSR Phase I System Development and Demonstration Contract award)
- Manufacturer: Oshkosh Corporation
- Produced: 2005-2013 (remains available)
- No. built: 2020
- Variants: MKR15 – wrecker (160) MKR16 – tractor (355) MKR18 – cargo (1505)

Specifications
- Mass: 24,517 kilograms (54,051 lb) unladen, 44,929 kilograms (99,051 lb) laden (A-kit configuration; B-kit adds approx. 2,041 kilograms (4,500 lb)). Towed load 24,040 kilograms (53,000 lb) kg
- Length: 10.98 metres (432 in)
- Width: 2.490 metres (98.0 in)
- Height: 4.11 metres (162 in) (with ISO container)
- Crew: 2 (third space for optional gunner position)
- Armor: a-kit/b-kit; U.S. Army Long Term Armor Strategy (LTAS) compliant
- Engine: Caterpillar (CAT) C-15 15.2-liter, inline-six water-cooled diesel developing 600 hp @ 1800 rpm and 2508 Nm torque at 1200 rpm
- Payload capacity: 16.5 ton: 33,000 lb (14,969 kg) off-road — 22.5 ton: 45,000 lb (20,412 kg) on-road
- Transmission: Allison 4700SP 7-speed automatic and Oshkosh 35000 single-speed transfer case
- Suspension: Oshkosh TAK-4 independent. Front axles rated at 7,666 kg; rear axles rated at 10,478 kg
- Fuel capacity: 628 litres
- Operational range: 483 kilometres (300 mi)
- Maximum speed: 105 kilometres per hour (65 mph)
- Steering system: Power-assisted, 1st, 2nd, 4th and 5th axles (mechanically controlled 4th and 5th axle contra-steer)

The Logistic Vehicle System Replacement (LVSR) is a family of heavy-duty military logistics vehicles of the United States Marine Corps (USMC) based on a common 5-axle ten-wheel drive (10x10) chassis. The vehicles vary in individual configuration by mission requirements, with three variants in service: a cargo, a wrecker and a tractor truck. The LVSR was designed and is manufactured by Oshkosh Defense.

The first LVSRs were ordered in 2006. The LVSR is the USMC's equivalent of the U.S. Army’s Heavy Expanded Mobility Tactical Truck (HEMTT) and Palletized Load System (PLS). The Marines do not use the HEMTT or PLS and the Army does not use the LVSR, but both services use a common trailer (M1076) with all three truck types.

== Development and production history ==
The predecessor of the LVSR, the MK48 Logistics Vehicle System (LVS), had entered service with the US Marine Corps (USMC) from 1985 and in the late 1990s a project to replace the LVS was started.

As a precursor to a formal LVS replacement programme a number of manufacturers co-operated with the USMC to build and evaluate an Advanced Technology Demonstrator (ATD). The ATD was built during 1998 at the Nevada Automotive Test Centre (NATC). LVS Modification Demonstrators (LVS-MDs) were also built, these integrating commercially proven automotive components and technologies.

In April 2001, Logistics Management Institute (LMI) completed their final report for the 'Analysis of Alternatives (AoA) for the USMC Logistics Vehicle System Replacement (LVSR), concluding the best option was to rebuy a vehicle similar to the technology demonstrator. Five alternative options had been considered, these were: Inspect and Replace Only As Necessary (IROAN) for the LVS; rebuild the LVS; re-manufacture the LVS to a higher standard; rebuy a vehicle similar to the technology demonstrator; research and develop an entirely new vehicle. Around this time it was suggested that 2,000-3,000 vehicles might be required, although throughout the program numbers would fluctuate.

An LVSR industry day was held in late 2001, and a formal solicitation to industry was released in early 2003. This had been delayed from an expected April 2002. The LVSR Request for Information (RfI) had originally been expected in May 2000.

In March 2004 Oshkosh Truck Corporation (now Oshkosh Defense) announced that the US Marine Corps had awarded the company a Phase I System Development and Demonstration Contract to supply three LVSR trucks. These were to be delivered to the Marines for extensive endurance and performance testing within 12 months.

This award was the first phase of a two-phase acquisition competition valued in March 2004 at $783 million for up to 1,581 vehicles. Competition for the Phase II production award (scheduled for March 2006) was limited to those companies that successfully completed Phase I evaluation. The other company selected for the Phase I evaluation was the American Truck Company (ATC) with a TATRA-based design.

Phase 1 testing was completed in 2005 and in late-May 2006, the USMC awarded the LVSR Phase II contract to Oshkosh Truck Corporation.

An initial LVSR order issued on 31 May 2006 was valued at $28 million and ordered 22 cargo, two wrecker (recovery), and tractor truck LVSR variants, plus vehicle kits, training (operator/maintainer-cargo), test support-production verification testing cargo, meetings, and contract data requirements.

The first LVSR cargo variant began testing at the Aberdeen Proving Ground in June 2007. Tractor and wrecker prototype vehicles began testing in November 2007 and April 2008 respectively. An additional 123 cargo variants, which completed low rate initial production (LRIP) quantities, were subsequently ordered under option year two of the production contract. In January 2009, Oshkosh announced an LVSR delivery order valued at $176 million. This called for more than 425 LVSRs and transitioned LVSR from LRIP into full-rate production (FRP).

LVSR fielding began in April 2009 for user trials and testing and the first vehicle was fielded to Afghanistan in September 2009. LVSR deliveries were completed in September 2013. Orders totalled 2,022, with the total order value around $965.78 million. Deliveries included 1,505 MKR18 cargo variants, 355 MKR16 tractor trucks, and 162 MKR15 wreckers.

The requirement for an LVSR companion trailer for the USMC has also been provided by Oshkosh. The M1076, which is already in service with the US Army, is the selected trailer. In May 2009, it was announced that the Marine Corps would receive an initial 30 M1076 PLST for use with the LVSR. By early 2016 the USMC had purchased a total of 687 PLST through a separate contract with the US Army.

== Technical description ==
The LVSR is powered by a 15.2-litre Caterpillar C15 six-cylinder in-line turbocharged, water-cooled four-stroke diesel, developing 600 hp (448 kW). This is coupled to a seven-speed Allison automatic gearbox and Oshkosh single-speed transfer case. Suspension is Oshkosh TAK-4 fully independent all-round, and by coil springs on the front two axles, hydraulic on the rear three.

The LVSR is based on a conventional C-section rigid chassis and to achieve the required turning radius, axles one, two, four, and five steer, the rear two axles steering mechanically and not electronically.

The two-seat cab fitted to the LVSR was designed from the outset to accept add-on armor.

The LVSR cargo variant is fitted with a hooklift-type load handling system, and all adapters and lift hardware are stored on the vehicle. The load handling system fitted is essentially the same system fitted to Oshkosh M1074/M1075 PLS and M1120 HEMTT, these systems being a licence-produced and revised version of the Multilift Mark 4 (now designated MPH165) system fitted to the British Army's De-mountable Rack Off-loading and Pick-up System (DROPS).

The LVSR has been designed to complement the USMC Oshkosh MTVR fleet with both types sharing some common parts and similar maintenance training. Wheels, tires, front axles, and TAK-4 suspension are common with the USMC MTVR.

The MKR15 recovery variant is able to flat tow a 110,000 pound (49895 kg) vehicle, is able to lift and tow a 96,000-pound (43545 kg) vehicle, is equipped with rear-mounted winches with a 78,000 pound (35380 kg) combined straight-pull rating, and a front-mounted self-recovery winch with a 20,000-pound (9072 kg) straight-pull rating.

The MKR16 tractor truck variant is fitted with a 60,000 lb. (27216 kg) self-recovery winch to winch equipment onto a trailer.

All variants are fitted with Oshkosh's Command Zone™ integrated control and diagnostics system.

== Armor protection kit ==
The add-on armor kit for LVSR was developed and supplied by Plasan of Israel. Plasan was awarded a contract in mid-2006 for 12 LVSR armor kits for testing. The November 2011-stated AAO for LVSR add-on armor B-kits quotes 651.

The armor system for LVSR follows the A-kit/B-kit principle, with vehicles designed 'fitted for, but not with', protection. In the case of LVSR, 'fitted for' includes an armored cab floor as standard. Cargo and wrecker variants require an upgrade of the front springs. Protection kits can be installed and uninstalled from vehicles in the field using only basic tools. The A-kit is fitted on the production line and is the combination of a limited amount of armoring (in difficult-to-access areas of the vehicle), together with a significant amount of armour installation attachments and required support structures. The bulk of the armor, the B-kit, is installed in the field on an 'as required' basis.

The benefits of the A-kit/B-kit principle are that armor is only fitted when required, this reducing vehicle wear and tear, and by default whole life cycle costs. Improvements and/or upgrades to armor are also far easier to integrate into an appliqué solution. The A-kit/B-kit principle is currently applied to all current production US tactical 'softskin' vehicles.

== Gallery ==
Oshkosh Logistic Vehicle System Replacement (LVSR)

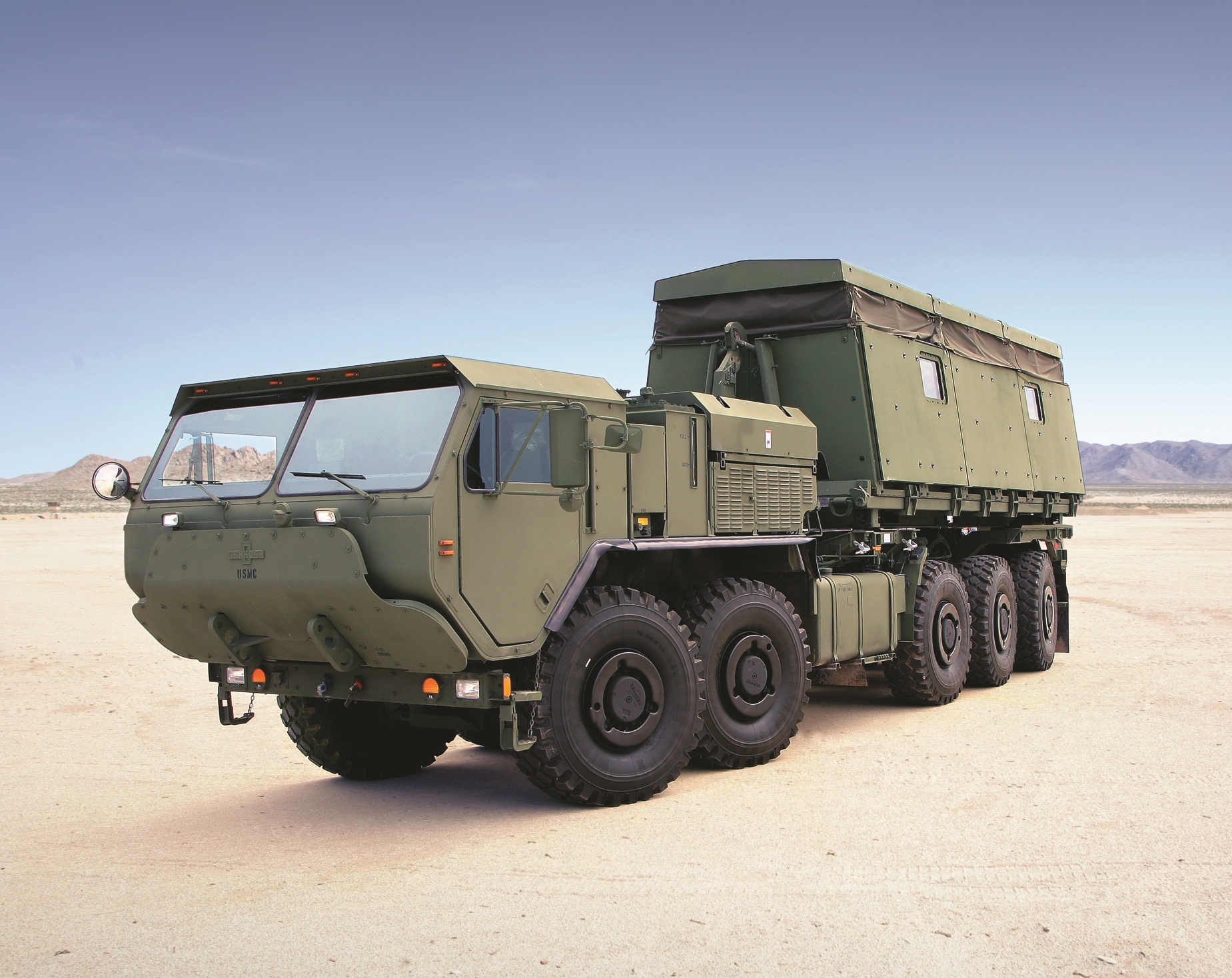
Oshkosh LVSR MKR18 cargo with unarmored (A-kit) cab

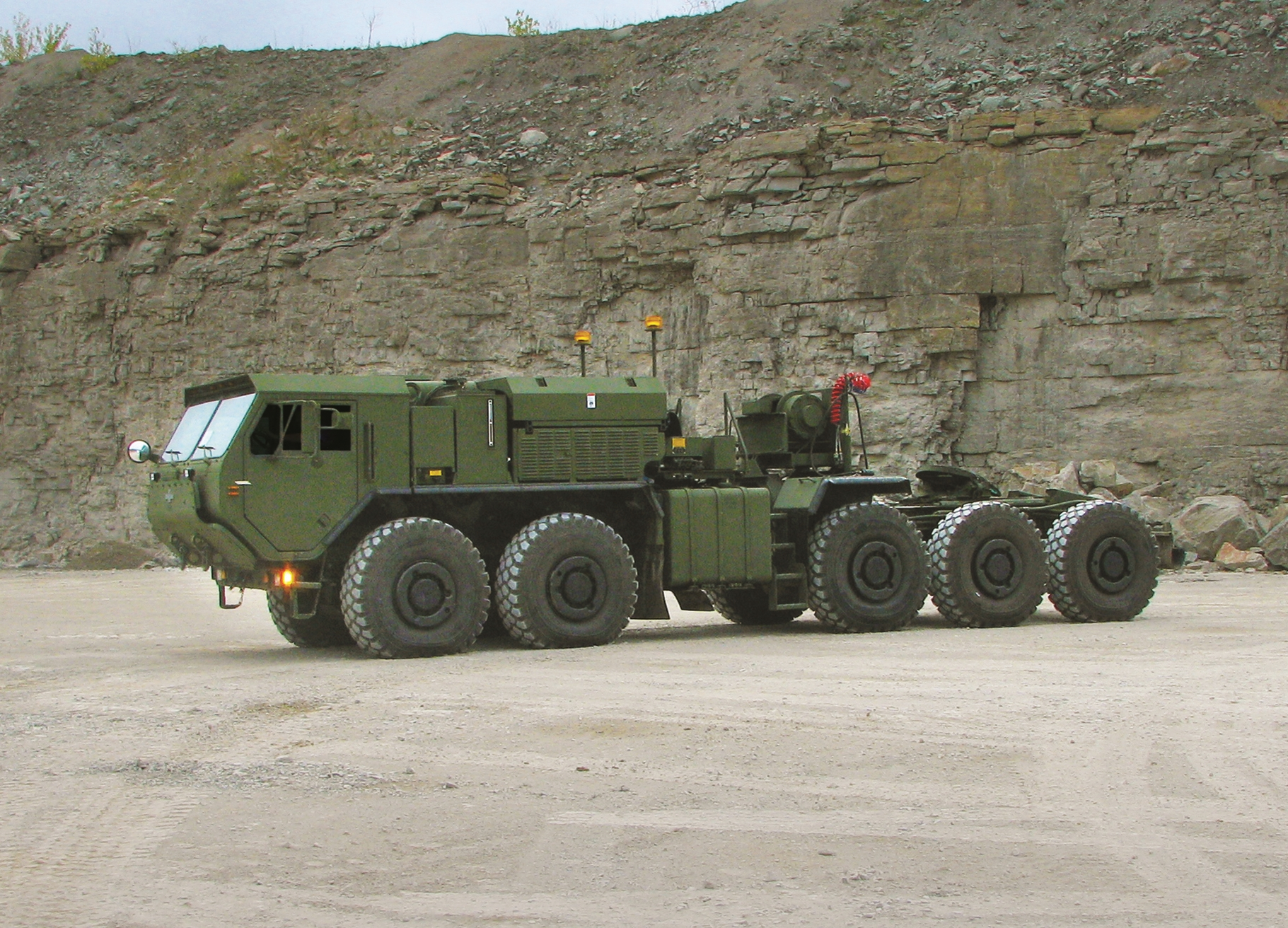
Oshkosh LVSR MKR16 tractor with unarmored (A-kit) cab

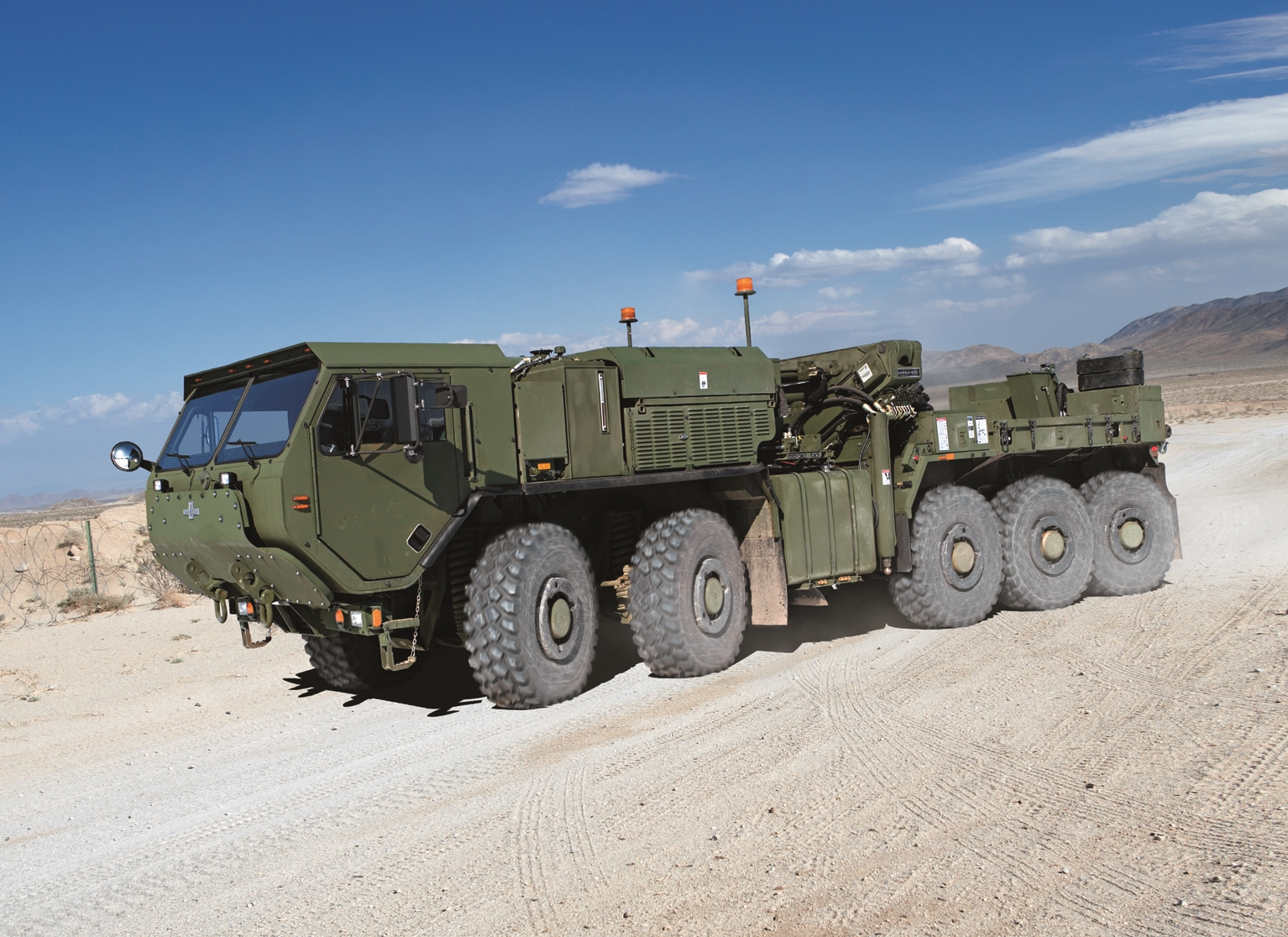
Oshkosh LVSR MKR15 wrecker with unarmored (A-kit) cab

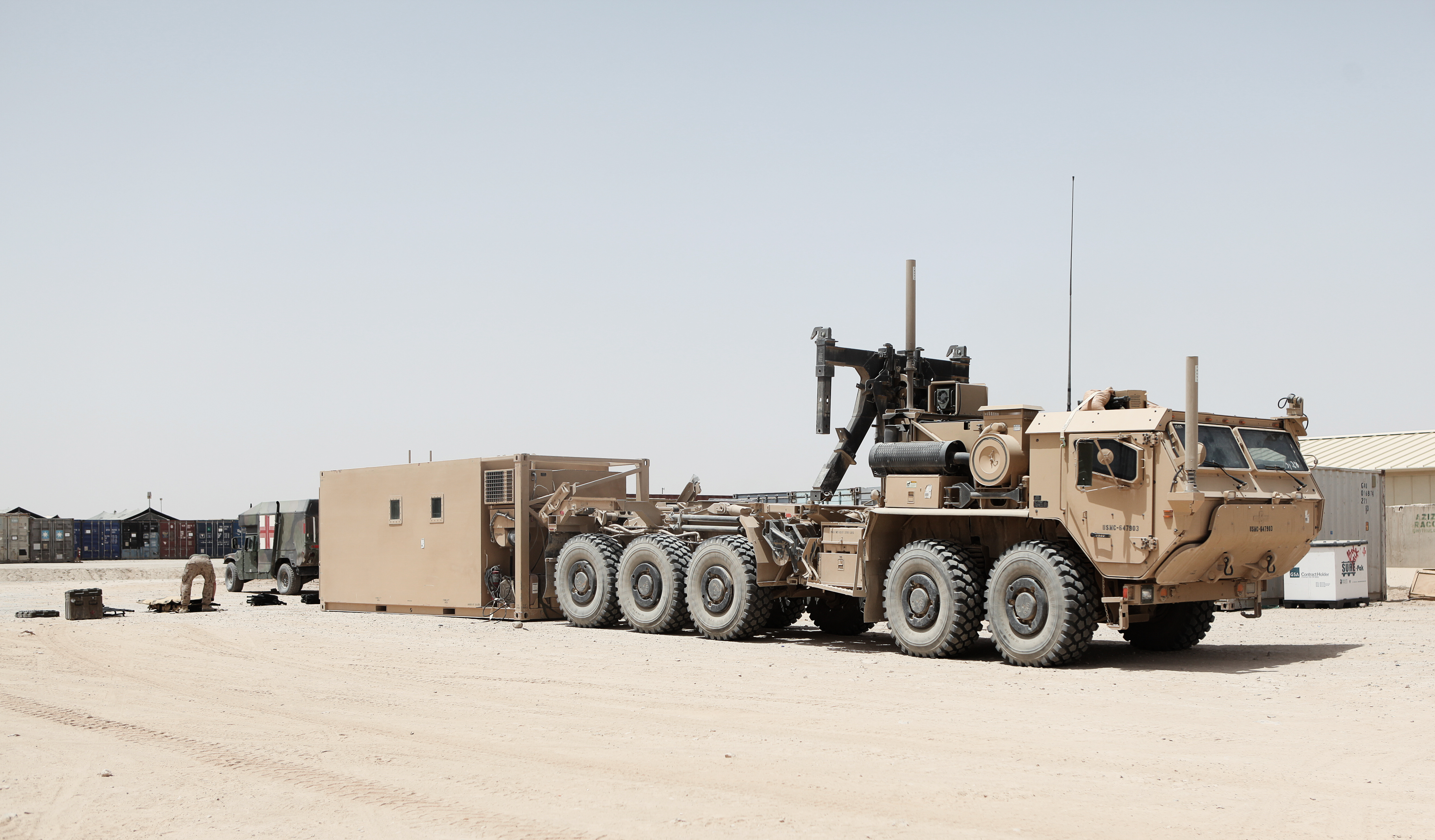
MKR18 cargo variant of the LVSR (with B-kit armor fitted); the load is a mobile trauma center

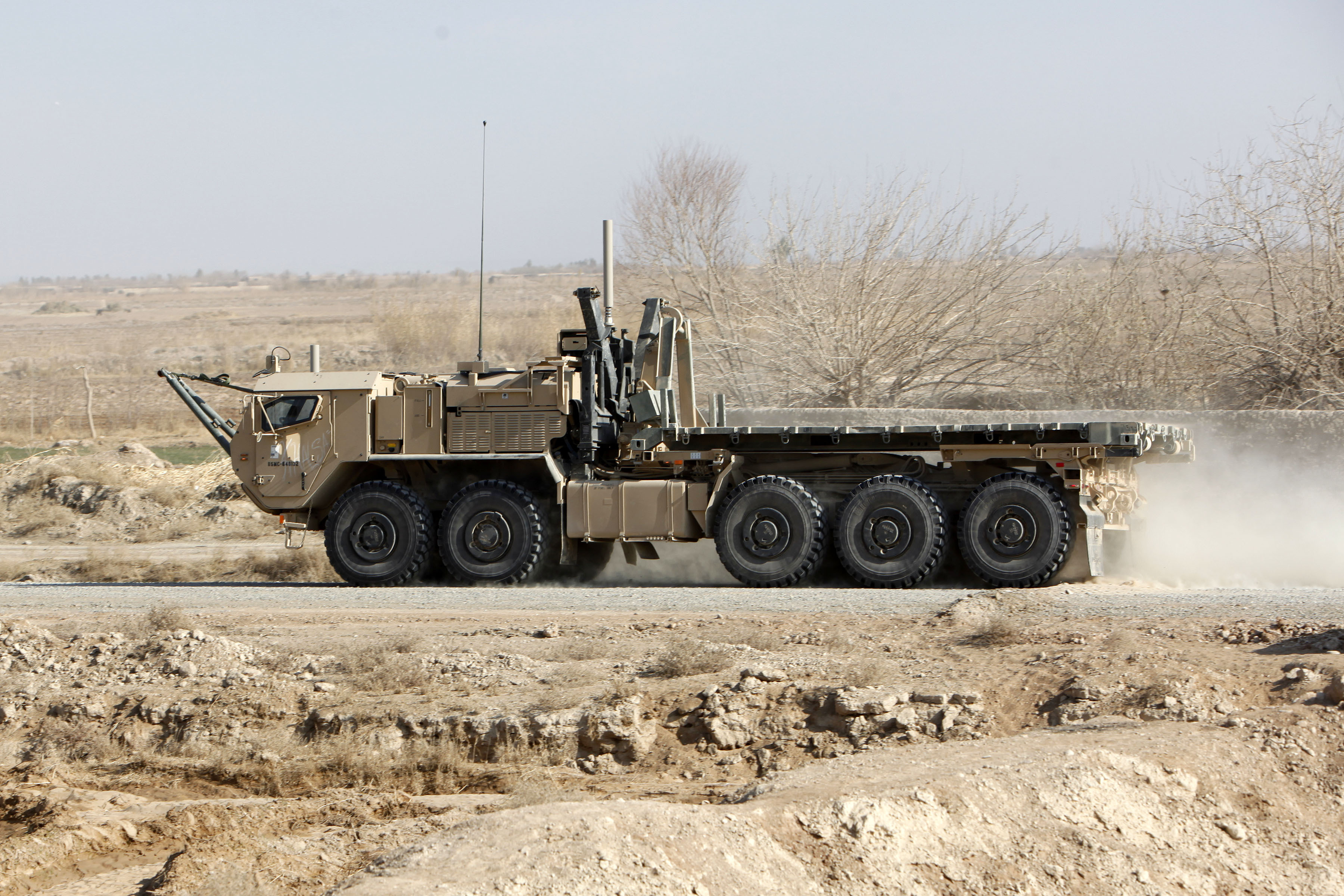
Photographed in Helmand Province, Afghanistan, a MKR18 cargo variant of the LVSR with B-kit armor fitted

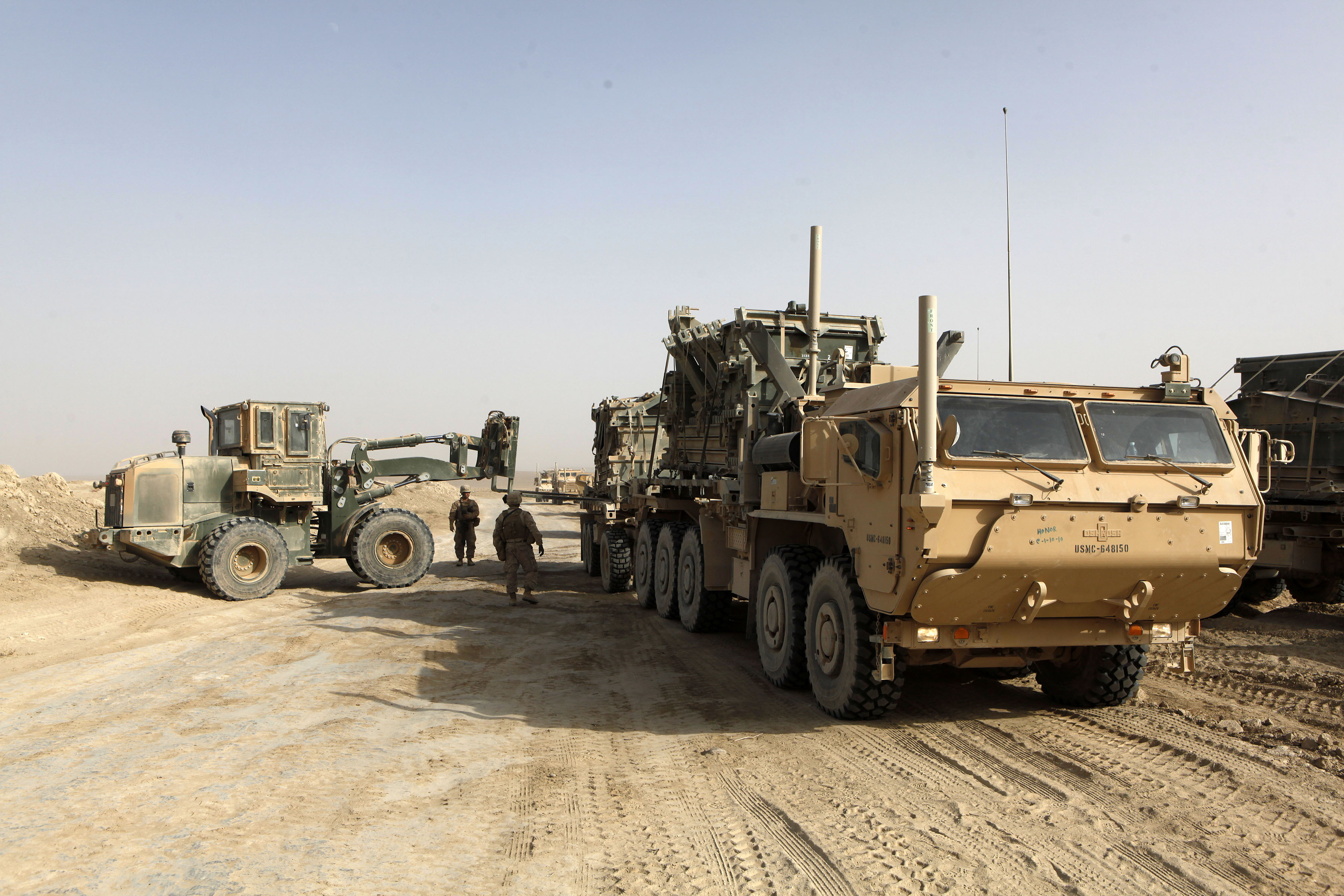
Photographed in Helmand Province, Afghanistan, this MK18 LVSR cargo variant is towing a M1076 PLST

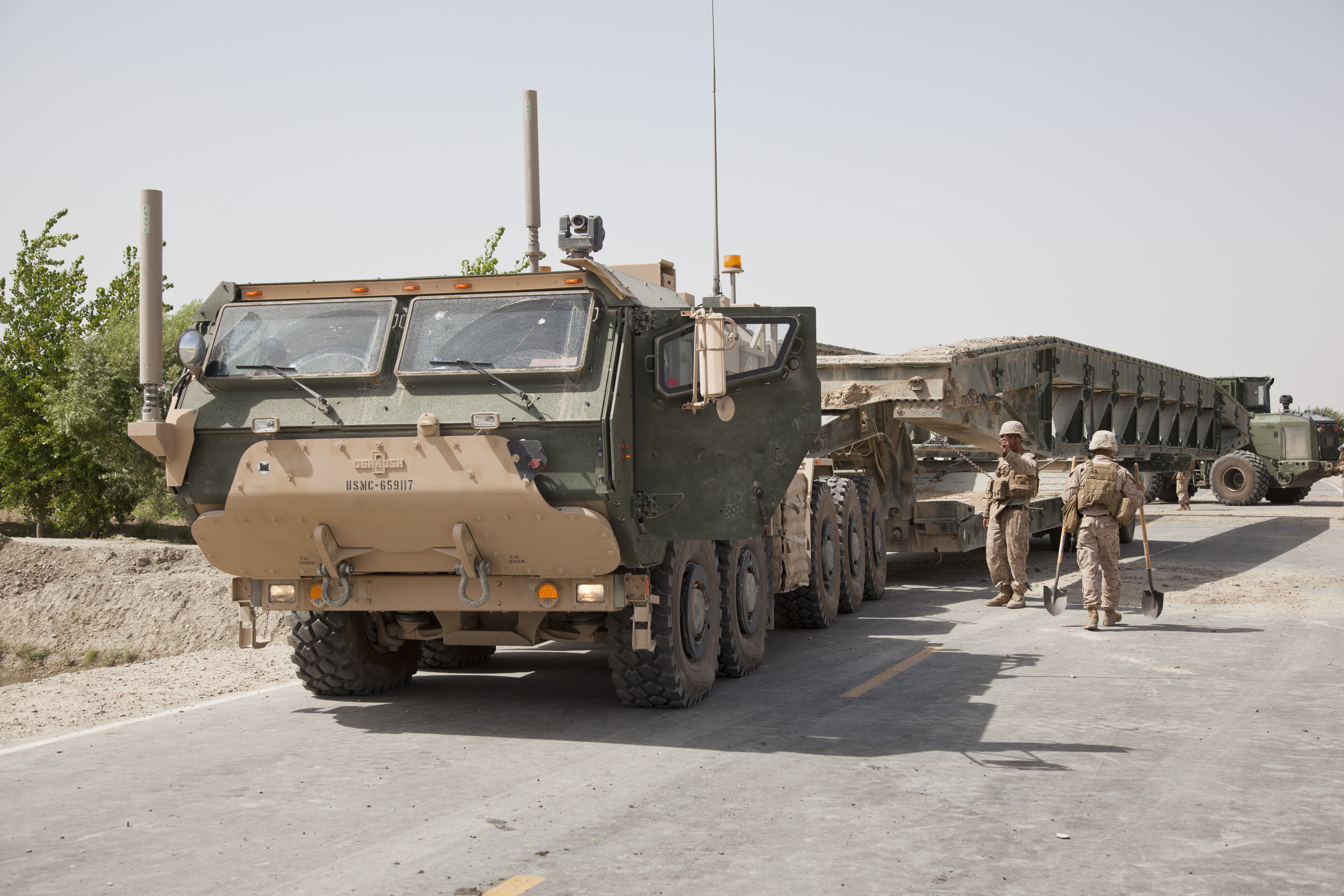
Photographed in Helmand Province, Afghanistan, a MK16 LVSR tractor truck variant

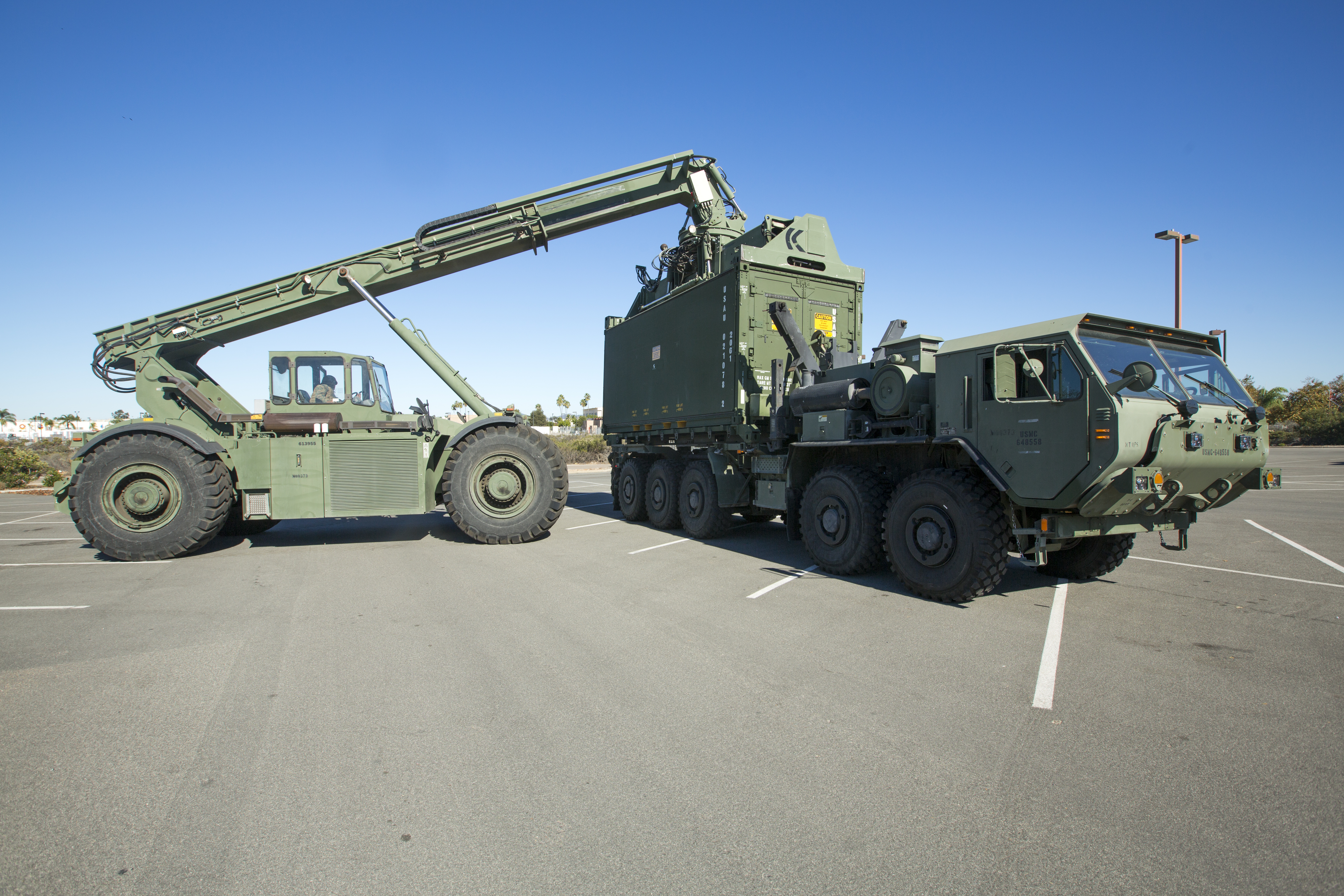
MKR18 cargo variant of the LVSR (without B-kit armor fitted)

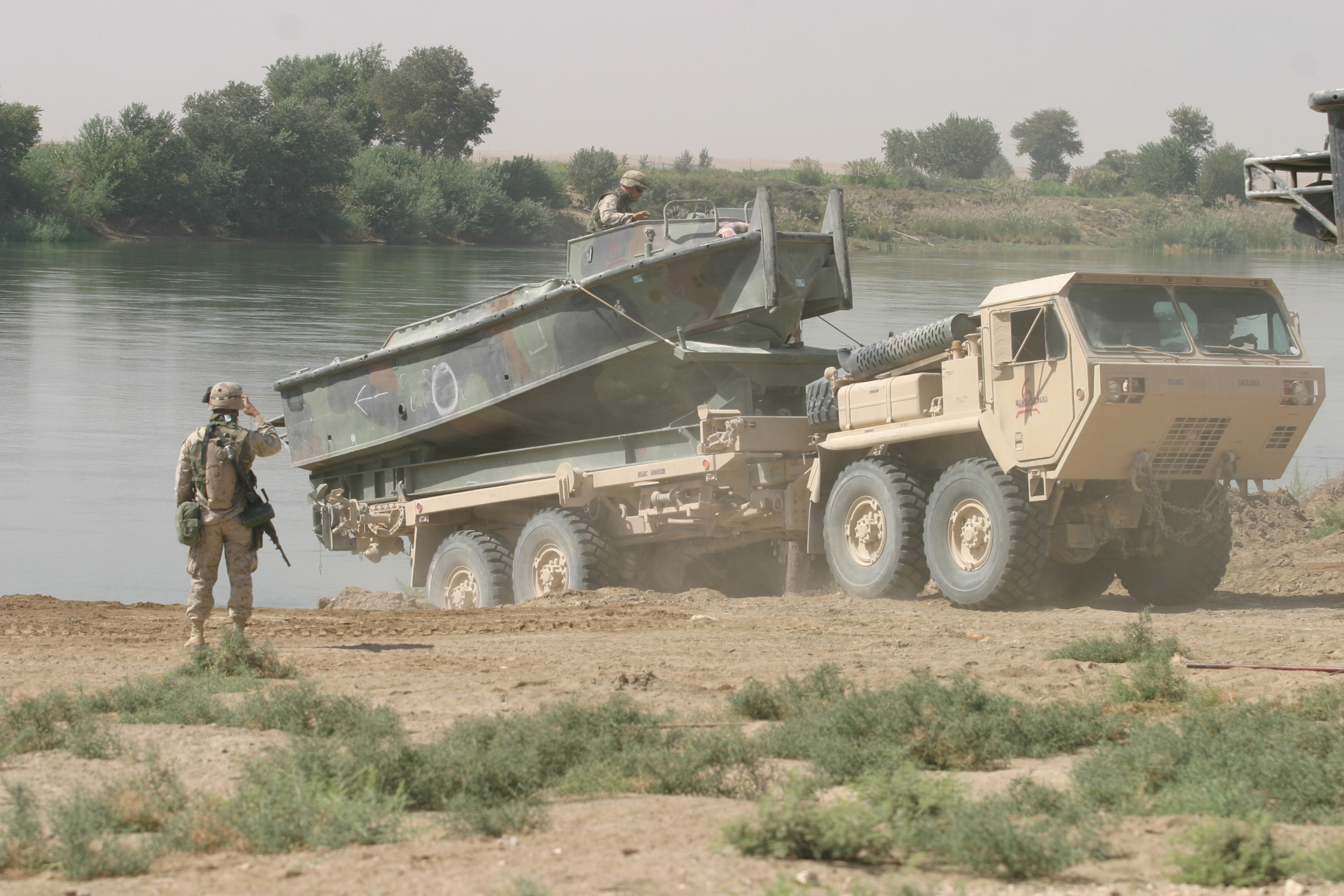
LVSR has replaced the earlier LVS (shown) in service with the U.S. Marines

== Variants ==
- MKR18 – cargo (1505)
- MKR15 – wrecker (160)
- MKR16 – tractor truck (355)

== Operators ==
- United States

== See also ==
- Demountable Rack Offload and Pickup System
- Heavy Equipment Transport System
- Heavy Expanded Mobility Tactical Truck
- List of U.S. military vehicles by model number
- List of vehicles of the United States Marine Corps
- Logistics Vehicle System
- Mobile Trauma Bay, a mountable module for the LVSR
- Palletized Load System
