= Mobile Trauma Bay =

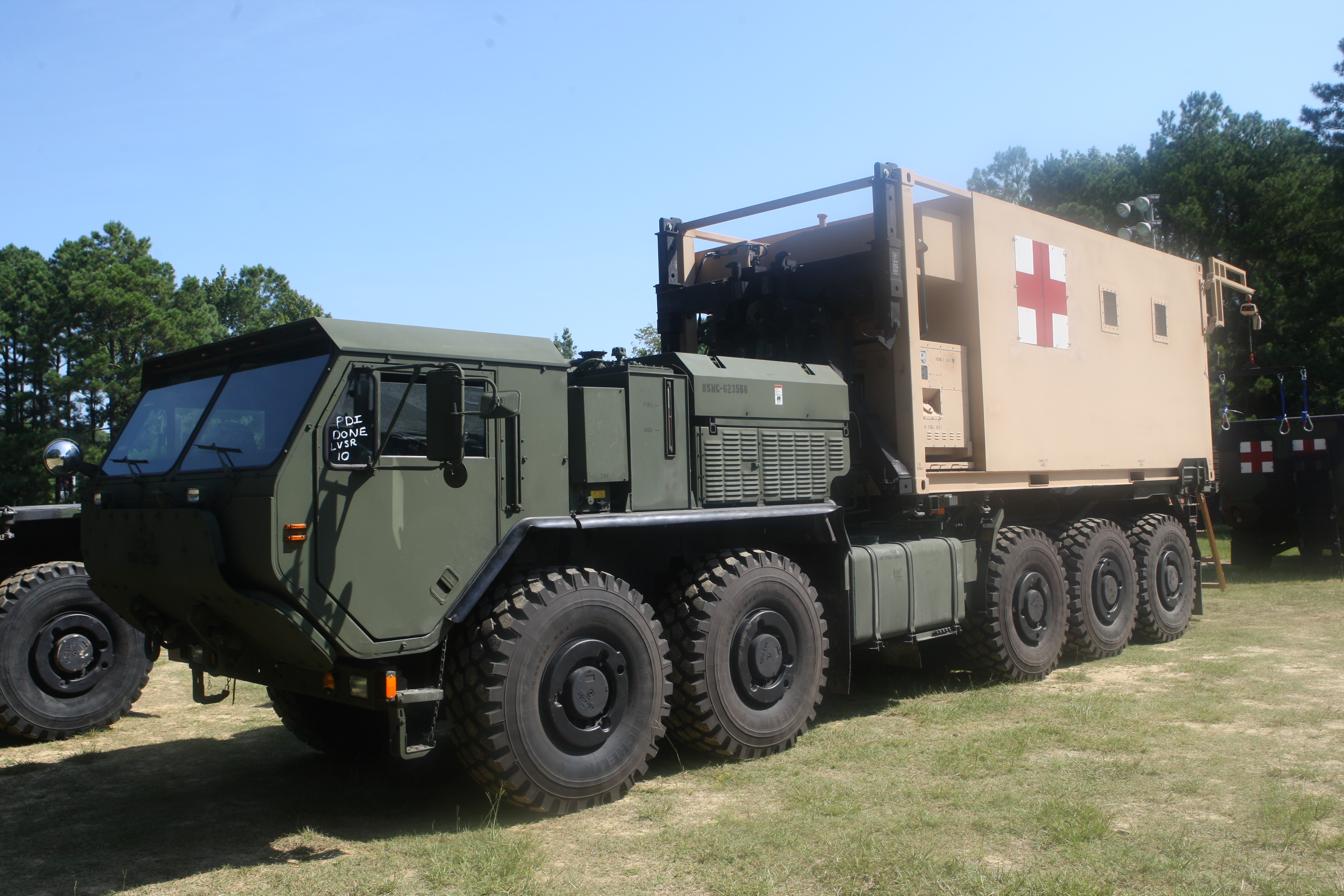
A Mobile Trauma Bay mounted on an Oshkosh Logistic Vehicle System Replacement (LVSR)

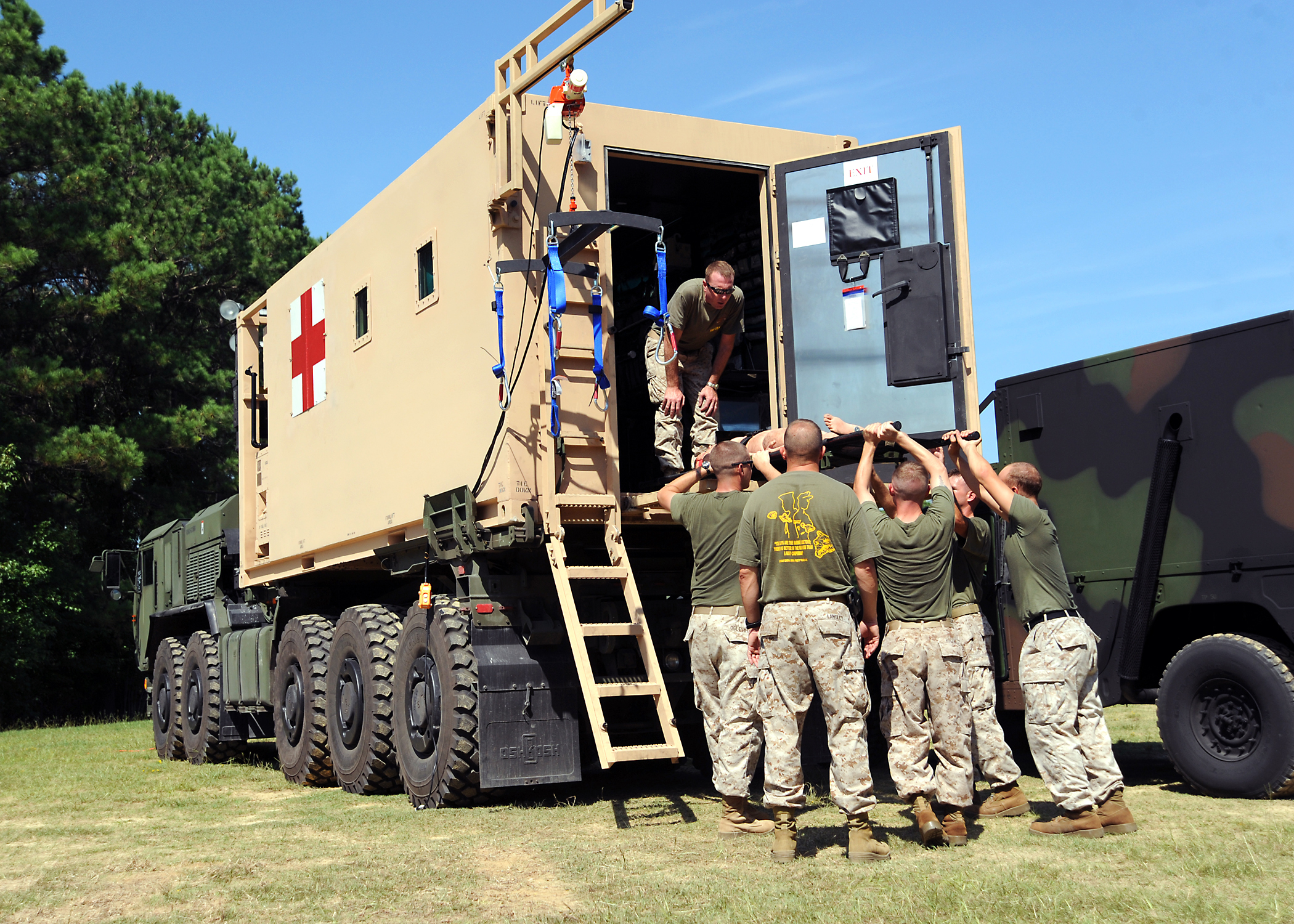
A Mobile Trauma Bay mounted on an Oshkosh Logistic Vehicle System Replacement (LVSR)

A Mobile Trauma Bay is a containerized ambulance bay mounted on an Oshkosh Logistic Vehicle System Replacement (LVSR). It holds state-of-the-art medical equipment and carries a Shock Trauma Platoon, generally consisting of one doctor, a nurse and three corpsmen, providing advanced resuscitative care to critically injured service members within the first hour after a traumatic injury (the "golden hour"). It takes emergency medical care far forward, saving more lives. Over 98% of the wounded Marines who make it into the MTB, make it out alive.

== History ==
The MTB was designed and developed by James L. Hancock in 2008. There were 914 concept drawings over the four-month period from design to deployment.
