= Murray Income Trust =

British investment trust

- Company type: Public
- Traded as: LSE: MUT; FTSE 250 component
- Industry: financial service activities, except insurance and pension funding
- Founded: 1923; 102 years ago
- Headquarters: Edinburgh, Scotland
- Key people: Peter Tait (Chairman)
- Website: www.murray-income.co.uk

Murray Income Trust (LSE: MUT) is a large British investment trust dedicated to investments in UK equities. The company is listed on the London Stock Exchange and it is a constituent of the FTSE 250 Index.

== History ==
Established as the Murray Caledonian Trust Company in 1923, it became the Murray Caledonian Trust Company in 1979 and the Murray Income Trust in 1984. After its manager, Murray Johnstone, was acquired by Aberdeen Asset Management in October 2000, it came under the management of Aberdeen. It absorbed 80% of the assets of the Perpetual Income & Growth Investment Trust in November 2020. The Chairman is Peter Tait.
