= Etnyre =

Defunct American motor vehicle manufacturer

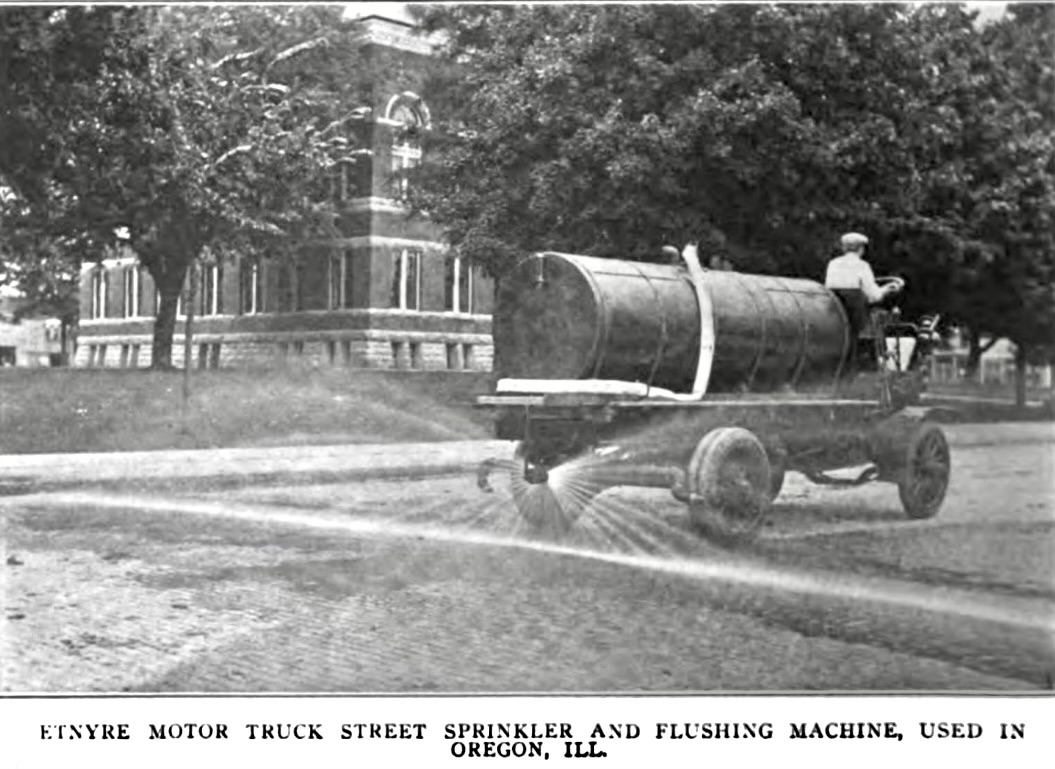
Etnyre Truck (1913)

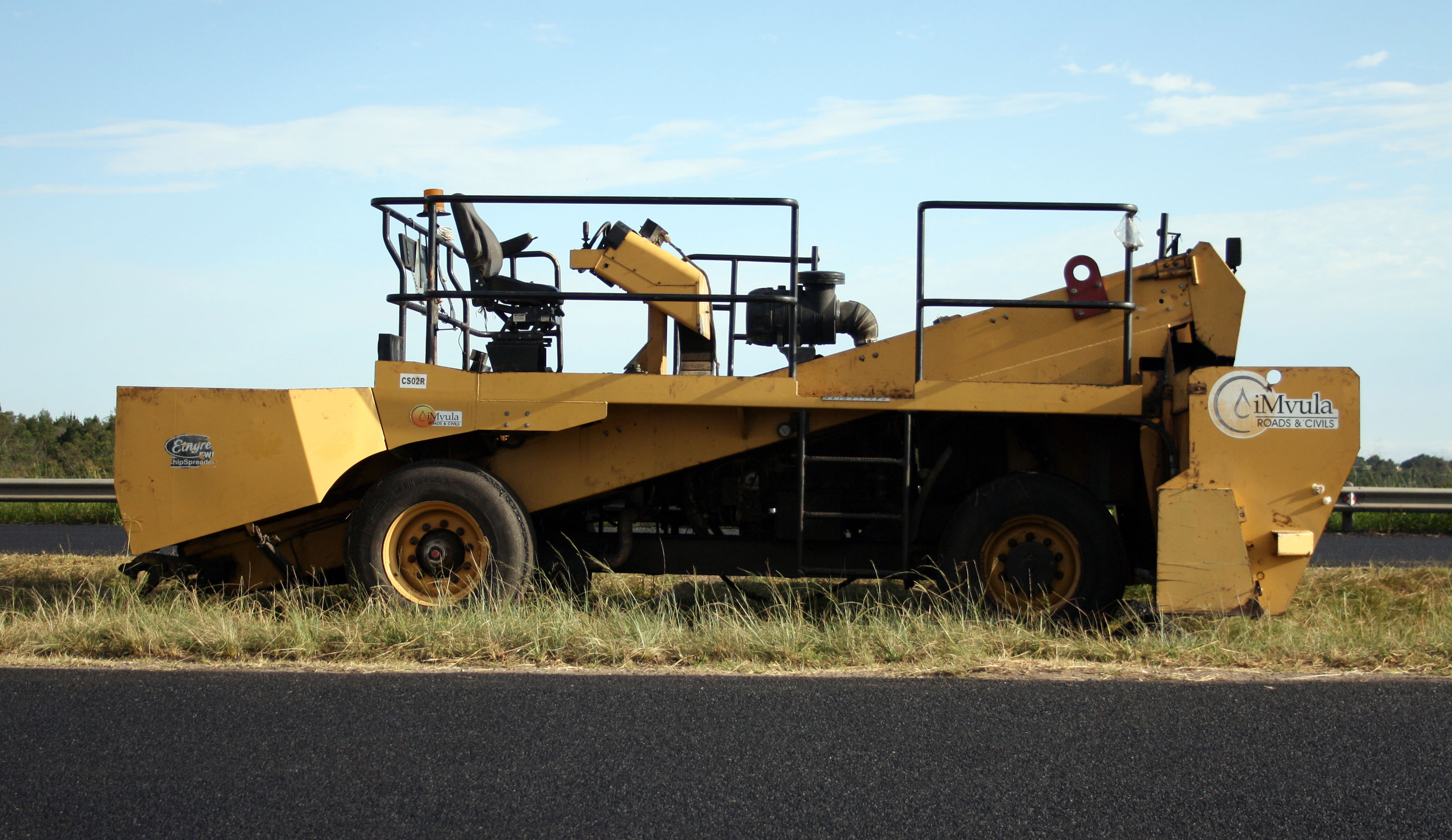
Etnyre FWD Chip Spreader

The Etnyre was an American automobile manufactured by the Etnyre Motor Car Company in Oregon, Illinois from 1910 until 1911.

The car was priced at $3500 (equivalent to $120,937 in 2025) and came with a 7.7 liter 50 hp four-cylinder engine of the company's own design. Touring, roadster, and other body styles were offered on the same 128 in (330 cm) wheelbase.

According to founder Edward D. Etnyre's daughter, Harriet, 10 cars total were made, four of which were worn out by her brothers during the "testing" phase.

Frequently seen on automobile lists spelled as Entyre, the correct spelling is Etnyre.

ED Etnyre & Co, the company founded by Edward D. Etnyre, is still based in Oregon, where equipment for asphalt road construction is built.
