= Logistics Vehicle System =

American military vehicle family

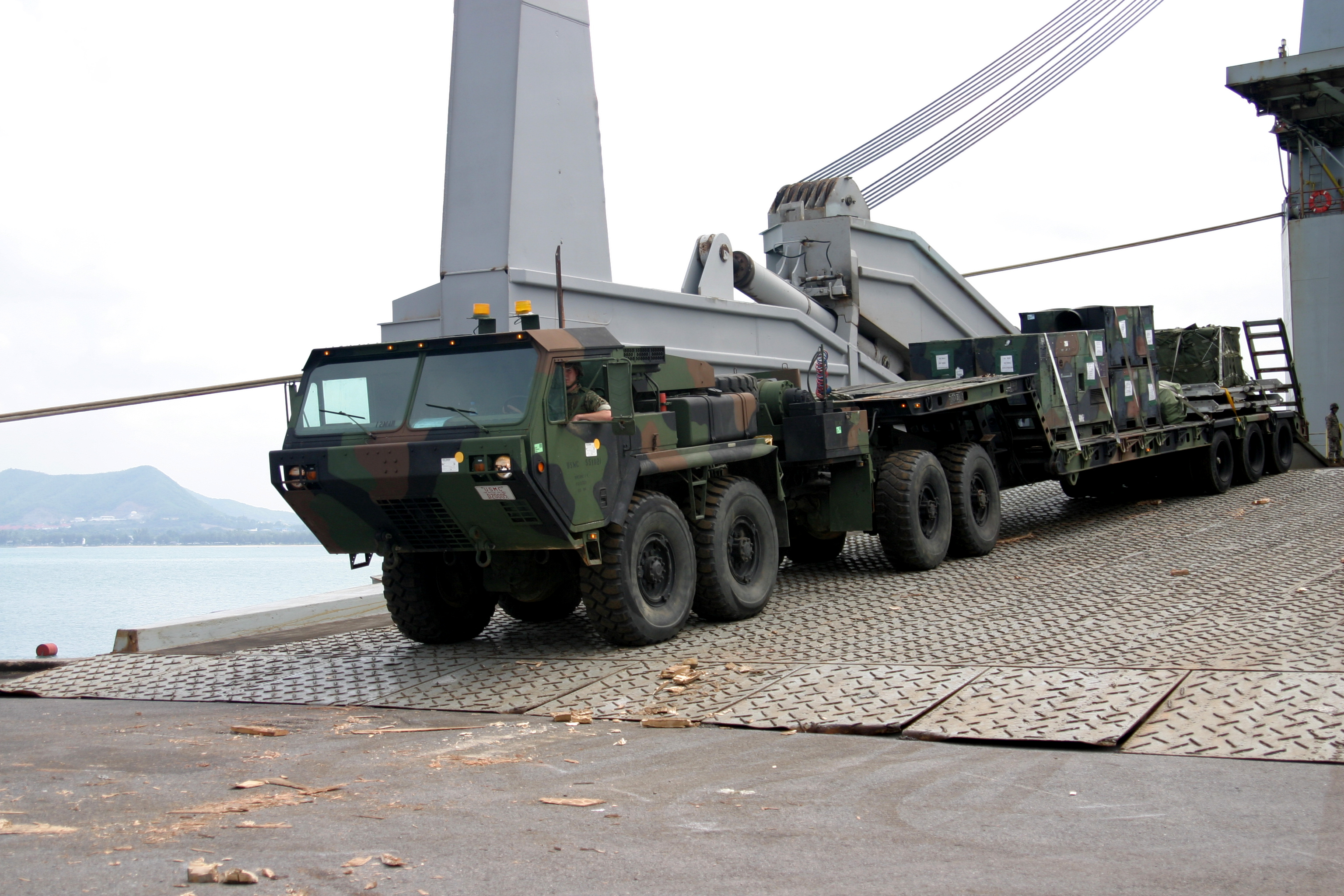
LVS fifth-wheel variant, towing an M870A2 semitrailer

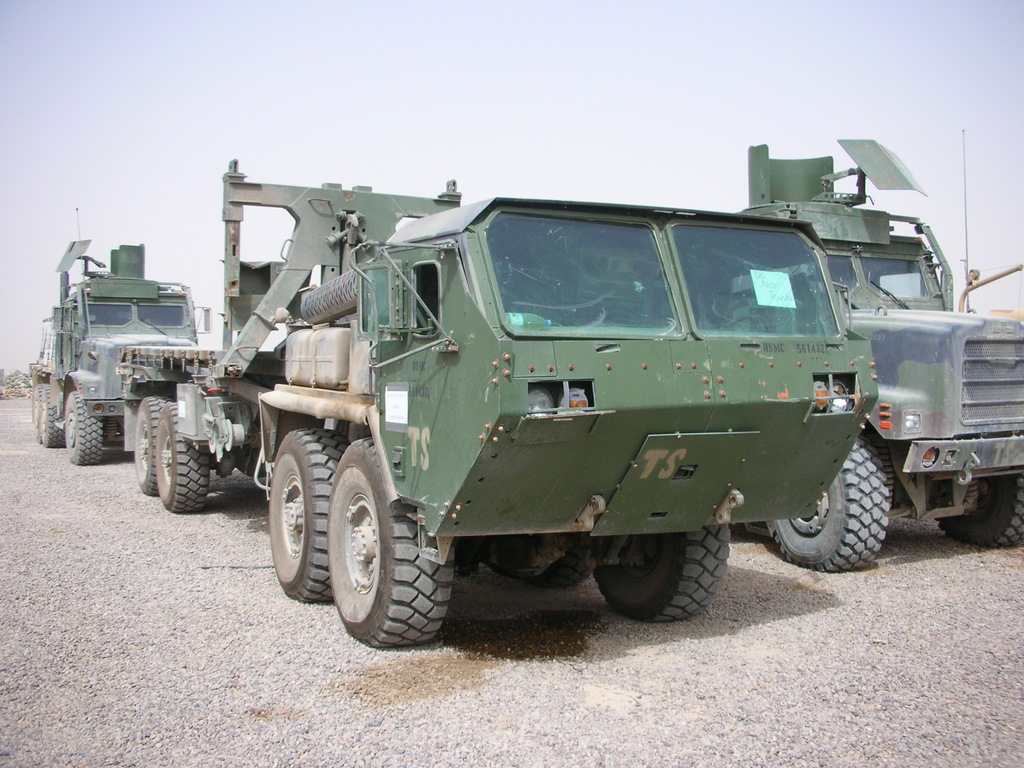
LVS self-loader variant (MK48/18A1) with MAK Armor-kit

The Logistics Vehicle System (LVS) is a modular assortment of eight-wheel drive all-terrain vehicle unit combinations used by the United States Marine Corps. It is nicknamed "Dragon Wagon", which is a reference to the famous M25 tank transporter.

The LVS was fielded in 1985 as the Marine Corps heavy tactical vehicle system. It was designed and manufactured by the Oshkosh Corporation. The United States Army does not use the LVS, it uses the Heavy Expanded Mobility Tactical Truck (HEMTT). The key difference between the two is the LVS's ability to interchange Front Power Units with Rear Body Units. The LVS also steers through both standard wheel pivoting (as on a typical automobile) and hydraulic yaw steering (by articulating the Front Power Unit against the Rear Body Unit). This enabled the LVS to meet the turning radius requirements of the U.S. Marines. LVS is rated to haul up to 22.5 tonnes (50,000 lb) on highways.

The Oshkosh Logistic Vehicle System Replacement (LVSR) is the replacement for the LVS and was first fielded in 2009.

== Description ==
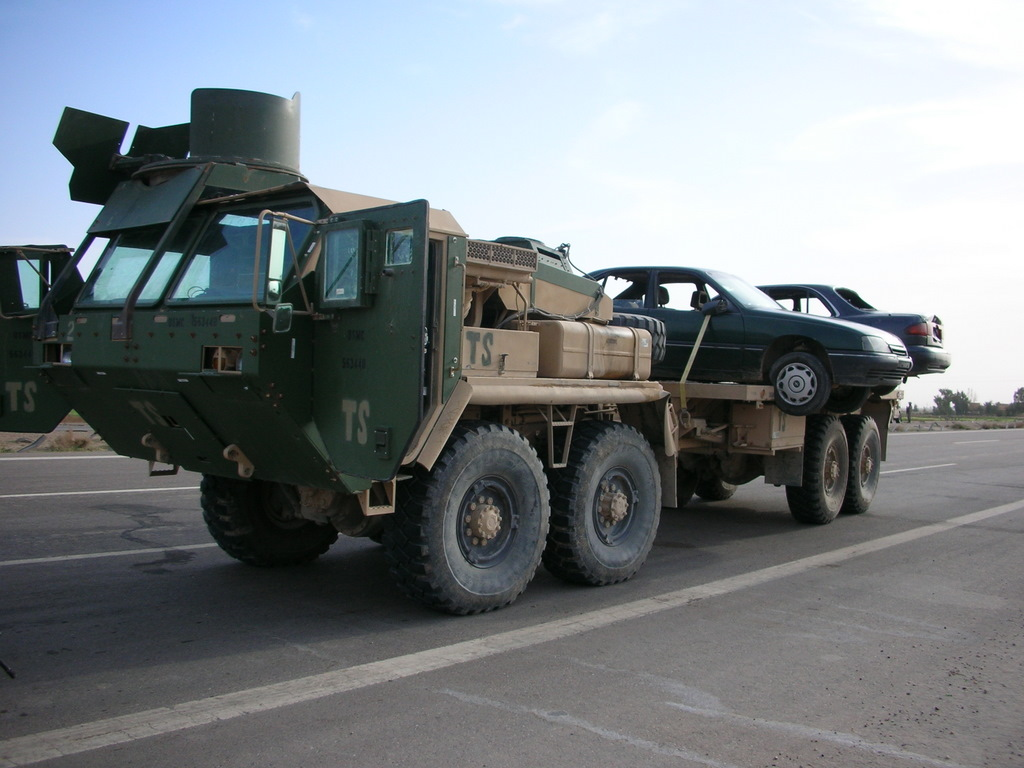
LVS Flatbed variant (MK48/14) with MAK armor kit and ring-mount weapons turret

The LVS is composed of a Front Power Unit (FPU) coupled to a Rear Body Unit (RBU). The FPU can be driven on its own. When describing a truck it is remarked by the combination of both units, for example, an MK48 FPU attached to an MK18 RBU is called a "48/18". For MK16's, which tow M870 semi-trailers, the type of trailer is added as well, i.e. "48/16/870A2".

Front Power Units

- MK48: houses a turbocharged 729 cubic inch, 450 hp Detroit Diesel V8, mated to a four-speed Allison transmission. The MK48 also houses the cab, for a crew of two.
- MK48A1: offers slight improvements to the original MK48. Those improvements include a revised battery box and cover, an extra cab entry step for both sides, modified air intake cover, and added handles and steps to ease climbing on top of the power unit.

Rear Body Units

- MK14: A flatbed which is 20 feet (6.1 m) long and features locks for ISO containers. The MK14 can hold a single twenty-foot equivalent unit (TEU) sized container, or three SIXCON units (pump or tank modules). There are also accommodations for tie-down hooks and ratchet straps for securing cargo. When equipped with a tow bar, two MK14s can be joined and towed by a single MK48 power unit. This is referred to as a "Tandem Tow" or "TT".
- MK15: Recovery vehicle capable of recovering LVSs, MTVRs and Humvees.
- MK16: Fifth-wheel is designed to tow the M870 family of semi-trailers. It is the shortest of the FPU/RBU combinations, creating a smaller turning radius. This is useful, as when towing an M870 trailer, it becomes the Marine Corps' longest tactical vehicle. The M870 trailer on its own is 41 feet 11 inches (12.78 m) long, and typical maximum load is around 80,000 pounds (36,000 kg), though some variants like the M870A3 can carry up to 100,000 pounds (45,000 kg).
- MK17: Material Handling Crane (MHC), which features a slightly shorter flatbed (8 by 16 feet (2.4 by 4.9 m)) than the MK14. This is to accommodate the MHC at the rear of the unit. The boom is rated at a maximum lifting capacity of 15,000 pounds (6,800 kg). The MK17 can also be fitted with benches to carry 20 combat-loaded Marines. This is rare however, as personnel transport is now mainly handled by MTVRs and HMMWVs.
- MK18/18A1: Self-loader capable of loading ribbon bridges, small boats, containers, and SIXCON modules with no external heavy-equipment support. The 18A1 features improvements to the loading and offloading process. The 18A1 features a prominent "stick-figure"–shaped Front Lift Adapter (FLA) rising from the middle of the vehicle.

== Specifications ==
Vehicle nomenclature	Length	Curb weight	Payload capacity onroad [offroad]	Turning radius
MK48/A1	238.5 inches (606 cm)	24,500 pounds (11,113 kg)	N/A	N/A
MK48/14	456 inches (1,160 cm)	40,300 pounds (18,280 kg)	45,000 pounds (20,412 kg) [25,000 pounds (11,340 kg)]	38.5 feet (11.7 m)
MK48/15	444 inches (1,130 cm)	50,550 pounds (22,929 kg)	20,000 pounds (9,072 kg)	38.5 feet (11.7 m)
MK48/16	398 inches (1,010 cm)	40,550 pounds (18,393 kg)	46,000 pounds (20,865 kg)	32.5 feet (9.9 m)
MK48/17	456 inches (1,160 cm)	47,200 pounds (21,410 kg)	39,000 pounds (17,690 kg) [20,000 pounds (9,072 kg)]	38.5 ft
MK48/18	456 inches (1,160 cm)	?	45,000 pounds (20,412 kg) [25,000 pounds (11,340 kg)]	38.5 feet (11.7 m)
LVSR	430 inches (1,100 cm)	?	45,000 pounds (20,412 kg); 200,000 pounds (90,718 kg) towed GCWR	83 feet (25 m)

System-Wide Specifications

Crew:	2
Width:	96 inches (240 cm)
Height:	102 inches (260 cm)
Maximum speed:	57 miles per hour (25 m/s) on roads (65 miles per hour (29 m/s) for LVSR
Maximum range:	300 miles (480 km)
Highest climbable grade:	60%
Steepest approach angle:	45°
Steepest departure angle:	45° (48° for MK48/16, 40° for MK48/17)
Maximum side slope:	30%
Maximum fording depth:	60 inches (150 cm)

== Operators ==
- United States

== See also ==
- Heavy Equipment Transport System
- Heavy Expanded Mobility Tactical Truck
- List of vehicles of the United States Marine Corps
- Medium Tactical Vehicle Replacement
- Oshkosh Corporation
- Oshkosh L-ATV
- Oshkosh Logistic Vehicle System Replacement (LVSR)
- Oshkosh M-ATV
- TerraMax (vehicle)
- United States Marine Corps
