= Ply =

Ply, Pli, Plies or Plying may refer to:

== Common uses ==
- Ply (layer), typically of paper or wood
  - Plywood, made of layers of wood
  - Tyre ply, a layer of cords embedded in the rubber of a tire

== Places ==
- Plymouth railway station, England, station code PLY
- Plymouth Municipal Airport (Indiana), IATA airport code PLY

== People ==
- Plies (rapper), American rapper

== Arts, entertainment, and media ==
- Ply (game theory), a turn in game play
- PLY (postnominal), a postnominal for athletes that participate in the Paralympic Games

== Computing and technology ==
- PLY (file format) or Polygon File Format
- PLY (Python Lex-Yacc), a parsing tool for Python
- Plying, a spinning technique to make yarn

== Other uses ==
- Abbreviation of polysexual
