= Perpetual Income & Growth Investment Trust =

Former British Investment Trust

- Company type: Public
- Traded as: LSE: PLI
- Founded: 1996; 29 years ago
- Fate: 80% of its assets absorbed by Murray Income Trust
- Headquarters: Bristol, England
- Key people: Richard Laing (Chairman)
- Website: www.invescoperpetual.co.uk

Perpetual Income & Growth Investment Trust (LSE: PLI) was a large British investment trust dedicated to investments in UK equities. Established in 1996, the company was a constituent of the FTSE 250 Index. The chairman was Richard Laing. The fund was managed by Invesco Perpetual. Murray Income Trust absorbed 80% of its assets in November 2020. The other 20% was distributed to shareholders.
