= PLSS =

PLSS may stand for:

- Public Land Survey System, a method used in the United States to survey and identify land parcels
- Primary life support system, a device connected to an astronaut's spacesuit
