= Heth (disambiguation) =

Heth may refer to:

- Heth, a letter in many Semitic alphabets
- Heth (surname)

== People ==
- Children of Heth, a Canaanite nation in the Hebrew Bible, named after Heth, son of Canaan, son of Ham, son of Noah
- In the Book of Mormon:
  - Land of Heth, a place in the Book of Mormon.
- "Heth", the signature of Australian cartoonist and caricaturist Norman Hetherington (1921–2010)

== See also ==
- Het (disambiguation)
- Hett (disambiguation)
- Hat (disambiguation)
