= Hatt =

Hatt may refer to:

== Places ==
- Hatt, Cornwall, England
- Hatt Building, on the National Register of Historic Places listings in Napa County, California

== Other uses ==
- Hatt (surname)
- Arabic خطّ (ḫaṭṭ: "line, writing"), everyday Arabic handwriting or script in contrast to style and system requirements of calligraphy Cf. ar:خط (توضيح) (Hatt, disambiguation)
  - Hijazi script (خط حجازي ḫaṭṭ ḥiǧāzī).
  - Hatt-i humayun, edict of the Ottoman government (e.g. Hatt-ı Hümayun of 1856)
- Help authoring tools and Techniques, a software program used to create help documents
- The Hatt family, fictional characters including Sir Topham Hatt, The Fat Controller, the head of the railway in The Railway Series of books written by Rev W. V. Awdry

== See also ==
- Hat (disambiguation)
- Hats (disambiguation)
- Het (disambiguation)
- Hett (disambiguation)
