= Hats (disambiguation) =

Hats are items of clothing worn on a person's head.

Hats may also refer to:

- Hats (party), an 18th-century political faction in Sweden
- Hats (album), an album by the British pop group The Blue Nile
- "Hats", a song from Heart in Motion, a 1992 album by American singer Amy Grant
- Histone acetyltransferases (HATs), enzymes linked to transcriptional activation
- de Bono Hats, the thinking strategies outlined by Edward de Bono in Six Thinking Hats
- Hi-hat (instrument), a standard part of a drum kit

== See also ==
- Hat (disambiguation)
- Hatt (disambiguation)
- Het (disambiguation)
- Hett (disambiguation)
- High hat (disambiguation)
