= Gravitar (band) =

American band

- Origin: Detroit, Michigan, US
- Genres: Noise rock, psychedelic rock
- Years active: 1992–2002
- Labels: Charnel Music
- Past members: Eric Cook; Harold Richardson; Geoff Walker; Michael J. Walker
- Website: www.simulated.net

Gravitar were an American noise rock band formed in Detroit, Michigan, United States, formed in 1992 by Eric Cook, Harry Richardson and Geoff Walker. In 1995, Richardson parted ways with the band and was replaced by Michael J. Walker, Geoff's brother. Aside from heavy metal and psychedelic acts such as Black Sabbath and Blue Cheer, Gravitar's music is strongly influenced by experimental music, jazz, and is mostly improvisational.

== History ==
Gravitar's roots can be traced back to the band Stinkeye, a band from Mt. Pleasant featuring Eric Cook and Harold Richardson. Both Geoff Walker and Richardson purchased music at Schoolkids Records in Ann Arbor and eventually formed a bond over their eccentric musical tastes. Harold Richardson chose the name Gravitar as a name for the newly formed band. Cook, who was unaware of the Atari videogame, liked the name because it had a sense of weight and thickness. The band's debut album Chinga su Corazon, which in Spanish means "fuck your heart", was released in 1993 through Charnel Music.

== Discography ==
- Chinga su Corazon (1994)
- Gravitaativarravitar (1995)
- Now the Road of Knives (1997)
- You Must First Learn to Draw the Real (1999)
- Edifier (2001)
- Freedom's Just Another Word for Never Getting Paid (2001)
