= Oshkosh M1070 =

Oshkosh M1070 Heavy Equipment Transporter
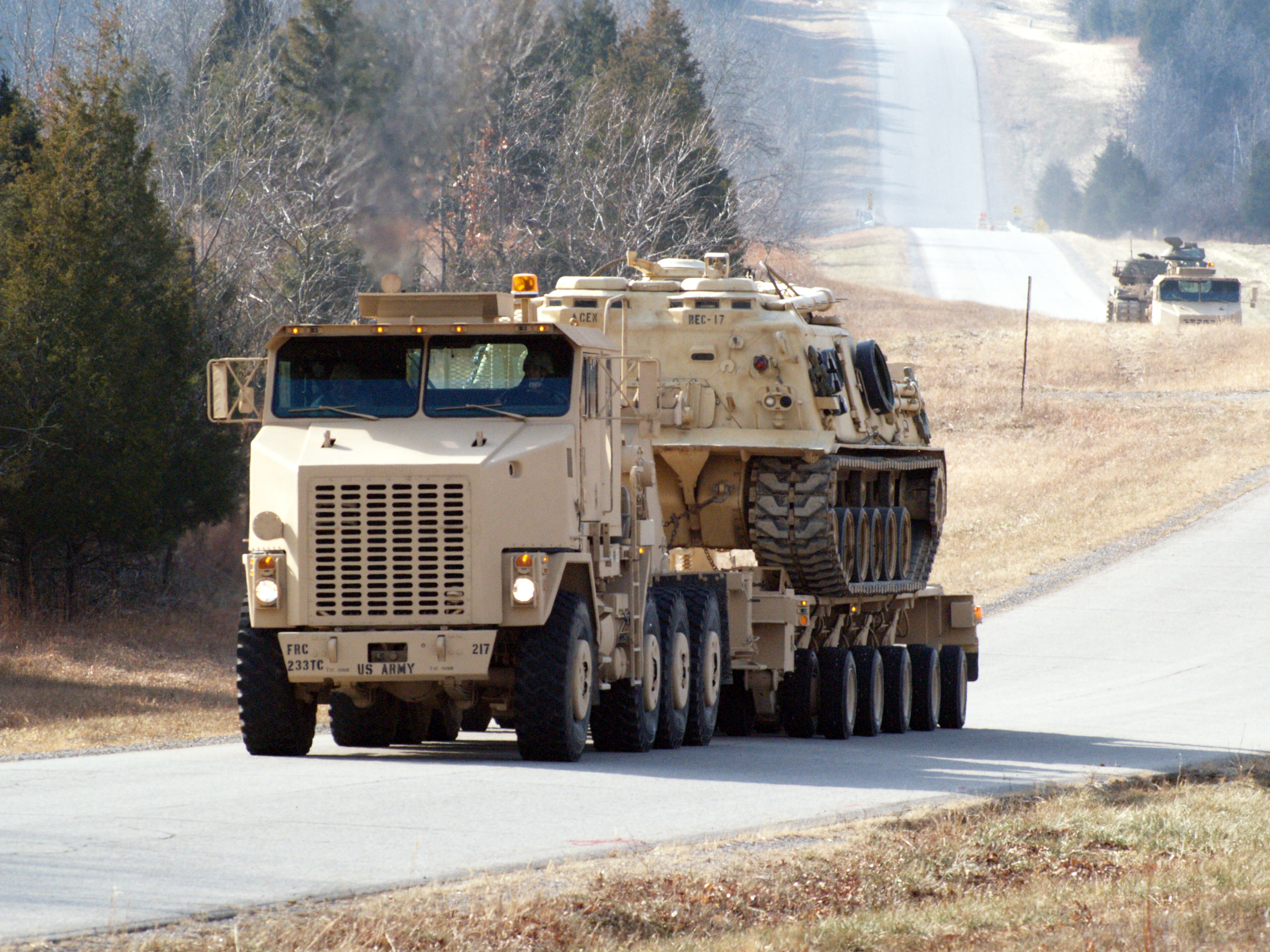
- An Oshkosh M1070A0 semi-truck and a M1000 semi-trailer operating as the HETS system, with an M88 Recovery Vehicle payload
- Type: Tank transporter
- Place of origin: United States

Service history
- Used by: U.S. Army and others (see Operators)

Production history
- Designer: Oshkosh Corporation
- Manufacturer: Oshkosh Corporation
- Produced: 1992–present
- Variants: M1070A0, M1070A1, M1300

Specifications
- Mass: Unladen (tractor) 18598 kg / 20657 kg. Fifth wheel load (at GCW) 20411 kg / 20884 kg. GCWR 104961 kg / 108461
- Length: 9.093 m / 9.677 m
- Width: 2.591 m / 2.591 m
- Height: 3.962 m / 3.708 m
- Crew: 2 operators (driver + 1) + 4 additional spaces (4 seats or 2 bunks)
- Armor: Protection levels classified; 796 add-on kits delivered for M1070A0 by BAE Systems; M1070A1 is a-kit/b-kit; U.S. Army Long Term Armor Strategy (LTAS) compliant
- Engine: Detroit Diesel Model 8V-92TA DDEC II, 12.06-litre diesel developing 500 hp at 2100 rpm and 1993 Nm torque at 1200 rpm / Caterpillar Inc C-18 18.01-litre turbocharged and intercooled 4-stroke diesel developing 700 hp at 2100 rpm
- Transmission: Allison CLT-754 5-speed automatic, TC-496 torque converter and Oshkosh 55000 2-speed transfer case / Allison 4800SP 7-speed, TC-496 torque converter and Oshkosh 30000 single-speed transfer case
- Suspension: The front Rockwell / AxleTech 5000 Series steer-drive axle is sprung by Hendrickson parabolic taper leaf springs. The rear Rockwell / AxleTech 5000 Series tridem unit is sprung by Hendrickson-Turner air suspension
- Fuel capacity: 947 litres / 947 litres (568 (L) & 379 (R))
- Operational range: 724 km / 523 mi @ GCWR and an average 48 km/h
- Maximum speed: 72 km/h (primary road at GCW) / 81 km/h (primary road at GCW)
- Steering system: power-assisted with front and rear axle co-ordinated steer; twin pump (main and auxiliary)

The Oshkosh M1070 is a U.S. Army tractor unit. Defined as a Heavy Equipment Transporter, it was produced in A0, A1, and M1300 configurations, replacing the earlier Oshkosh M911 tractor unit.

The M1070’s primary role in the U.S. Army is as a tank transporter, hauling the M1 Abrams tank on a DRS Technologies M1000 semi-trailer as the Heavy Equipment Transport System (HETS). It is also used as a prime mover to transport, deploy, and evacuate armored personnel carriers, self-propelled artillery, armored bulldozers and other heavy vehicles and equipment of all types. The M1300 is a U.S. Army Europe-specific derivative designed to be road legal within Europe and operates with a different trailer.

Export sales of A0 and A1 variants have been made, and derivatives of the M1070 have been produced or are available, these including the M1070F and the Global HET.

== History ==
The M1070 was proposed by the Oshkosh Truck Corporation to meet a U.S. Army requirement for the transport of the M1 Abrams main battle tank (MBT). A contract for 1,044 M1070 was placed, with production commencing in July 1992. The contract included an option for 522 additional units.

The final U.S. Army contract for the original A0 version called for an additional 195 vehicles. These were delivered between March 2001 and March 2003, bringing total U.S. Army deliveries of A0 versions to 2,488. In total, and including export orders, just under 2,900 M1070A0 were manufactured by Oshkosh.

Two separate contracts were awarded in 2004 to Oshkosh Truck for overhauling service-worn M1070s. A total of 1,109 tractors were reset to an original build standard and with zero miles/zero hours and a full one-year warranty. The cost to the U.S. Department of Defense was about 75% of that of new build vehicles.

The M1070E1 model was developed in the mid-1990s in conjunction with the U.S. Army as a possible Technology Insertion Programme (TIP) for the M1070. An evaluation took place and a report was submitted. No orders were placed.

In March 2008 Oshkosh Defense was awarded a single source contract valued at more than $11 million (for Phase 1) from the U.S. Army to begin engineering and initial production of the next-generation of HET. Phase II involved production verification testing. In July 2009 Oshkosh received a $9.4 million contract modification to begin durability and performance testing of the HET A1 at Yuma Proving Ground.

In October 2010 Oshkosh had its first delivery order for the M1070A1 HET. This delivery order was valued at over $440 million and called for more than 1,000 vehicles, with the first vehicles rolling out in December 2010. M1070A1 fielding commenced in 2011. Production concluded in August 2014, with new vehicle production totalling 1,591. While it was believed the U.S. Army would have liked to continue HET A1 production through fiscal year 2017, no awards were made. In July 2016 the U.S. Army announced that it wished to use FY16 funds to start an engineering study into an E-HET that would replace the current M1070A1 and M1000 semi-trailer.

In March 2017 Oshkosh was awarded a $15,080,369 foreign military sales contract for M1070A1 Heavy Equipment Transporters to Jordan and Oman, with associated testing, spare parts, and training. The estimated completion date for the award was December 2018. Solicitation W56HZV-17-R-0021 released in February 2017 and with responses due by April 2017 will result in a firm-fixed-price contract for 46 M1070A1 for Egypt.

In July 2017, and following a report to congress in June 2017 under solicitation number W56HZV-17-R-0167, the U.S. Army released a Sources Sought Market Survey regarding the Heavy Equipment Transporter Urban Survivability Kit (HUSK). In May 2013 an Acquisition Decision Memorandum authorised the U.S. Army to develop and acquire armoured replaceable cabs for the M1070A1, this leading to the HUSK. Survivability features of the HUSK were to include energy attenuating seats, a floating floor, blast-mitigating floor mats, and an automatic fire extinguishing system.

HUSK armour and survivability testing occurred at Aberdeen Proving Ground during 2016. A decision regarding government contract or contract with industry for the production award was anticipated during FY 2018. As of late 2020 the HUSK was being produced by Rock Island Arsenal-Joint Manufacturing & Technology Center. Numbers involved had not been disclosed.

The three-year Family of Heavy Tactical Vehicles (FHTV) 4 contract extension awarded to Oshkosh by the U.S. Army in May 2021 technically allows for the provision of new and Recapitalized M1070 HETs alongside HEMTTs, and PLS trucks and trailers.

M1300

The M1300 is a M1070A1 revised for use within Europe by the U.S. Army. The need for the M1300 formally emerged after the U.S. Army Europe (USAREUR) issued an Operational Needs Statement (ONS) for the M1300-supplied transport capability, which Army headquarters had validated in April 2017. From that month through September 2017, the Product Manager for Heavy Tactical Vehicle developed multiple courses of actions that included the development and procurement of a new tractor, leasing tractors outside the US, or ‘enhancing’ the current M1070A1 HET tractor fleet.

In December 2017, the Army Requirements Oversight Council validated the requirement. In January 2018 the service directed the procurement of 170 capability enhanced M1070A1 HET tractors, referred to as ‘rebaselined’ and designated M1300.

The M1300 requirement was driven by a need to transport heavier loads within Europe, while complying with European Union (EU) standards. Projected payloads for the M1300 and semi-trailer were stated to be a minimum of 82 tonnes and up to 90 tonnes (74,389 to 81,647 kg). To achieve this, the tractor required some weight redistribution from the front axle and a new multi-axle semi-trailer. Oshkosh began working on the M1300 tractor in April 2018 and was scheduled to continue through to April 2020.

As Oshkosh is the sole developer of the M1070A1 and owns the technical data package (TDP), it was, according to the Army, the only source possessing the requisite knowledge, facilities, tooling, and expertise to perform the capability enhancements required. Any other source, through a competitive procurement, to reverse engineer, test and evaluate and then commence initial delivery would require a minimum of 27 months, therefore missing the timeline directive of the ONS.

In May 2019 Oshkosh announced that the U.S. Army Tank-automotive and Armaments Command (TACOM) had awarded the company and partner, Broshuis BV, a contract to produce semitrailers for the M1300. The contract, initially awarded at US$13.3 million, has a maximum value of US$109.8 million and calls for 170 semitrailers to be delivered between fiscal years (FYs) 2020 and 2021. The U.S. Army's selection came after two prototypes successfully completed a three-month test and evaluation phase at Aberdeen Test Centre in Maryland, US.

Enhanced Heavy Equipment Transporter System (EHETS)

The Enhanced Heavy Equipment Transporter System (EHETS) is considered the replacement for the M1070/M1070A1/M1300 in U.S. Army service. The U.S. Army announced in July 2016 that it wished to use FY 2016 funds to start an engineering study into an EHET that would replace the M1070A1 and M1000 semi-trailers. This study had previously been slated to commence in FY 2017. The intent was that the EHETS would comprise a tractor and semi-trailer to transport, recover, and evacuate a +80 tonne (72,575 kg) combat loaded M1 Abrams and associated M88 recovery system, which was anticipated to weigh more than 84,000 kg. The M1070A1 and M1000 are technically unable to transport such loads.

Under Solicitation Number W56HZV-18-R-0190, the U.S. Army issued a Sources Sought notice for EHETS in September 2018. Under Solicitation Number W56HZV-18-R-0190, the U.S. Army in September 2018 announced an EHETS Industry Day to be held in October 2018. In April 2020 the U.S. Army under notice ID PANDTA-20-P-0000-007236 announced an EHETS contract opportunity Request for Information (RfI) as a Special Notice. The purpose of the RfI is to assess the marketplace availability and industry capabilities for providing an EHETS Trailer. The proposed EHETS Trailer solution is to be a trailer capable of transporting a payload of both 85 tonnes and 82 tonnes while meeting European Highway Axle Restrictions for road permits. The army is interested in contracting directly with trailer manufacturers as the prime contractor.

As of November 2020 the U.S. Army stated that it was working towards a future solicitation and intended to move forward with additional EHETS procurement beginning in FY 2022. The M1300/M1302 procurement for Europe covered in the previous sub-section will fulfill a portion of the overall EHETS procurement.

== Technical description ==
The layout of the M1070 is conventional. The fully enclosed cab seats the driver, one crewman and up to four passengers. The original cab complied with the U.S. Army's Long Term Armor Strategy (LTAS) requirements of an A- and B-kit armoring philosophy. For the M1070A1, a May 2013 Acquisition Decision Memorandum authorised the U.S. Army to develop and acquire armoured replaceable cabs for the M1070A1. This led to the HUSK. As of late 2020 the HUSK was being produced by Rock Island Arsenal-Joint Manufacturing & Technology Center. Numbers involved have not been disclosed.

The chassis of the M1070 is 356 × 89 × 9.5 mm C-section (channel frame) constructed from SAE 1027 modified, heat-treated carbon manganese steel with a minimum yield strength of 758 MPa. This mounts a 3.5 inch fully floating Holland fifth wheel and three winches, two dp Manufacturing 55K 24,947 kg capacity hydraulic winches with 51.8 m of 25 mm cable each, and a single dp Manufacturing 3GN 1,360 kg capacity auxiliary winch with 91.4 m of 6 mm cable.

The original M1070 is powered by a Detroit Diesel 8V-92TA 12.06-liter diesel engine with 500 hp at 2100 rpm and 1993 Nm torque at 1200 rpm. This is coupled to an Allison CLT-754 five-speed automatic transmission and Oshkosh 55000 two-speed transfer case. The M1070A1 is powered by a Caterpillar C-18 six-cylinder diesel with 700 hp. This is coupled to an uprated Allison 4800SP seven-speed automatic transmission and Oshkosh 30000 single-speed transfer case.

On the A0 model the front Rockwell steer-drive axle has Hendrickson parabolic taper leaf springs. The rear tridem unit is sprung by Hendrickson-Turner air suspension. The rearmost axle is a steer-drive unit. All axles are Rockwell SVI 5MR hub-reduction with differential locks. Steering is power-assisted, and has an auxiliary pump should the main pump fail. Mechanical linkage also provides operator control in the event of hydraulic oil pressure loss.

Rockwell, now AxleTech, S-cam drum brakes are fitted. A CM Automotive central tire inflation system (CTIS) is fitted, with four predetermined terrain settings, Highway, Cross-Country, Mud & Snow, Emergency, that enable the operator to adjust tire pressure and lock-up to suit the terrain being crossed. A Run Flat mode checks tire pressures regularly and inflates as needed to compensate for leaks.

The A1 model features uprated AxleTech 5000 Series axles, an anti-lock braking system with traction control and a Dana central tire inflation system. Armor mode increases tire pressures to compensate for the added weight of the B-kit armor. The operator can manually increase or decrease differential locking based on conditions.

=== Trailer ===
The trailer used with the M1070A0 and M1070A1 is the M1000. The M1000 was originally developed as a private venture by Southwest Mobile Systems, later Systems & Electronics Inc (SEI), now DRS Technologies, as a response to a possible U.S. Army requirement for transporting M1 and M1A1 MBTs. A production order for 1,066 M1000 units was placed by the U.S. Army in 1989. By July 2009 more than 2,600 M1000 trailers had been ordered.

The M1000 has 40 wheels (215/75R 17.5 tires) across five axle lines, these with two half-width axles per line. Each axle has hydraulic pendular suspension, providing a 254 mm stroke, with lateral oscillation accommodating surface undulations. A hydraulic suspension system is provided on the pivoting gooseneck to equalise fifth wheel loads. The weight of the M1000 is 22,882 kg. The payload according to the U.S. Army is 63,560 kg, although the manufacturer quotes 80,000 kg at reduced speeds. The overall length is 15.8 m, the deck length is 10.58 m; the deck width is 3.05 m, 3.66 m for a wide deck version.

The M1070 and M1000 are both air-transportable by C-5 Galaxy or C-17 Globemaster III aircraft.

The next generation trailer with the M1300 is the M1302, this supplied by Broshuis BV from The Netherlands.

== Oshkosh M1070F (British Army) ==
The M1070F replaced the Scammell Commander as the British army tank transporter in 2001. Before the development of the M1070A1 for the U.S. Army, the more powerful M1070E model was developed as a possible Technology Insertion Programme (TIP) for the M1070A0 fleet. The M1070E1 was offered to meet the British Army's requirement for a tank transporter but was not selected. The vehicle selected by the British Army is the 1070F model, a much-revised M1070E1.

The UK fleet, which when delivered was made up of 92 tractor trucks, 89 King GTS 100/7 semi-trailers, and three Tru-Hitch recovery systems, were delivered as part of a Private Finance Initiative (PFI) award to FASTTRAX in 2001 that included staff to operate the vehicles as Sponsored Reserves. The contract award included a 28-system option that was not exercised. In late-2009 Broshuis from The Netherlands was selected to supply 20 heavy-duty 45,000 kg payload full-width two-axle trailers for use with the 1070F in Afghanistan.

The Oshkosh 1070F shares a common chassis and axle set-up with the M1070A0 model. The cab and all major driveline components have been substantially revised to meet both performance and legislative requirements. The driveline is similar to that fitted to the M1070A1 and consists of a Caterpillar C-18 diesel engine with 700 hp. This is coupled to an Allison HD 4076P automatic transmission and TC-561 torque converter, coupled to an Oshkosh 30000 single-speed transfer case.

== Oshkosh Global HET ==
Oshkosh Defense unveiled the Global HET in 2008. The Global HET is similar in many ways to the M1070A1, the main design difference being configuration. The Global HET has three axles, the M1070A1 has four. Oshkosh disclosed an initial order from Al Jaber Group of the UAE for around 20 Global HET in February 2011. Global HET was selected to meet a requirement for a tractor unit to be used in conjunction with 70,000 kg semi-trailers, mounting the locally developed Jobaria Multiple Launch Rocket System (MLRS).

== Gallery ==
Oshkosh M1070 heavy equipment transporter and derivatives

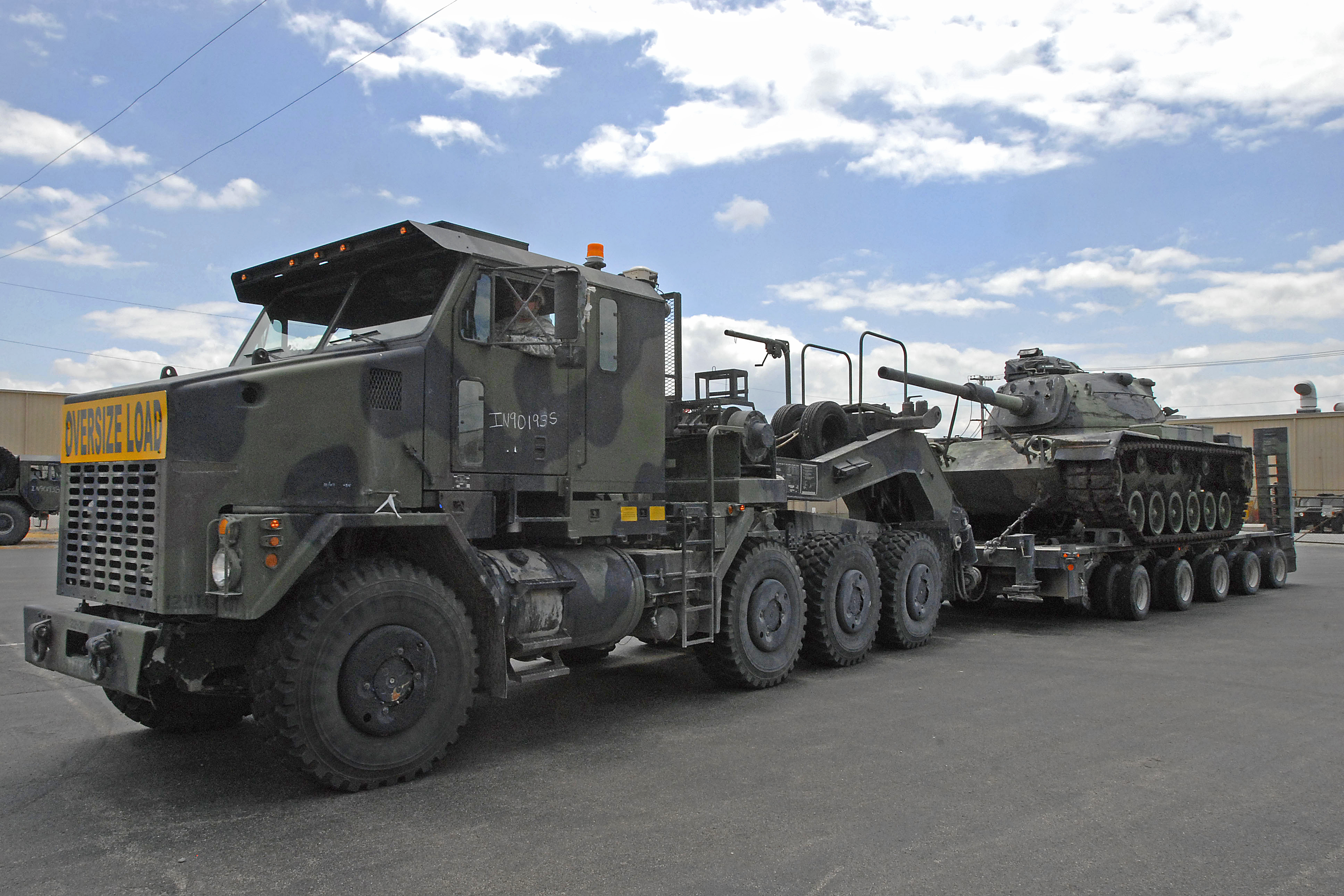
An Oshkosh M1070A0 HET and a DRS M1000 semi-trailer hauling an M60 tank

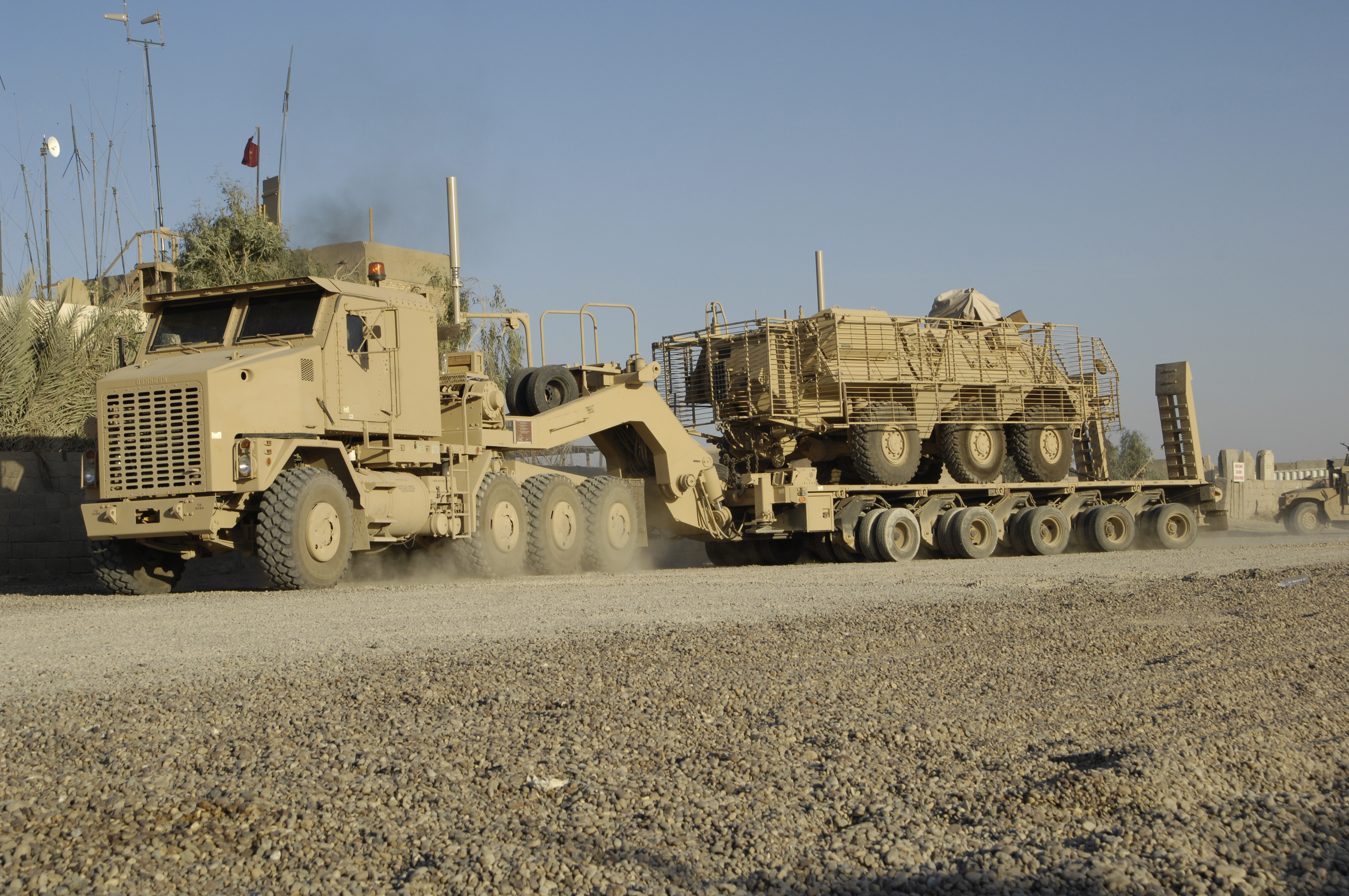
An Oshkosh M1070A0 and a DRS M1000 semi-trailer carrying a M93 Fox NBC detection vehicle

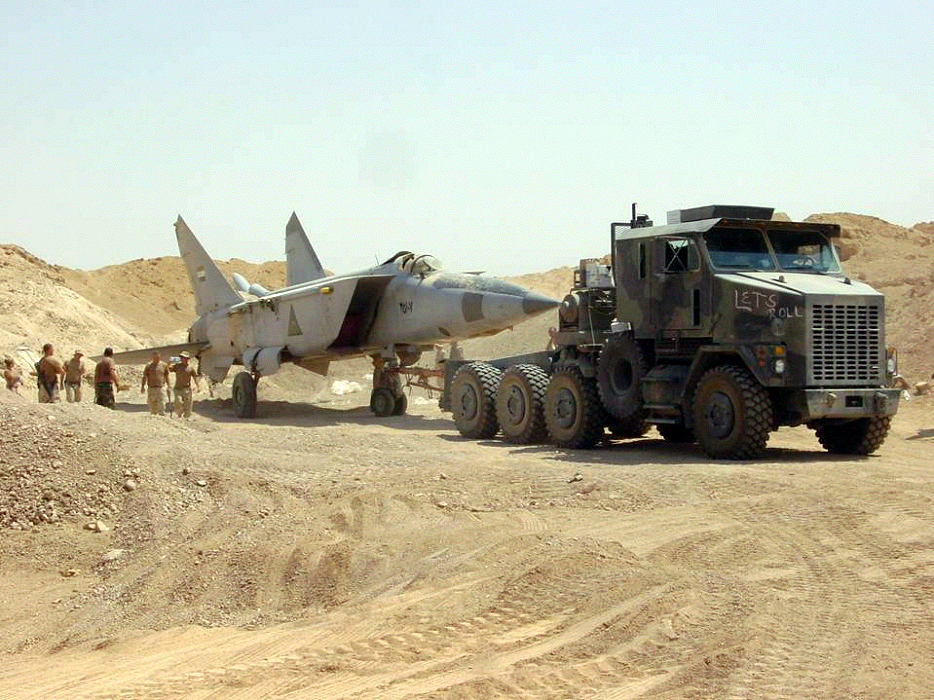
An Iraqi MiG-25RB Foxbat-B found buried under the sand west of Baghdad is towed by an M1070A0

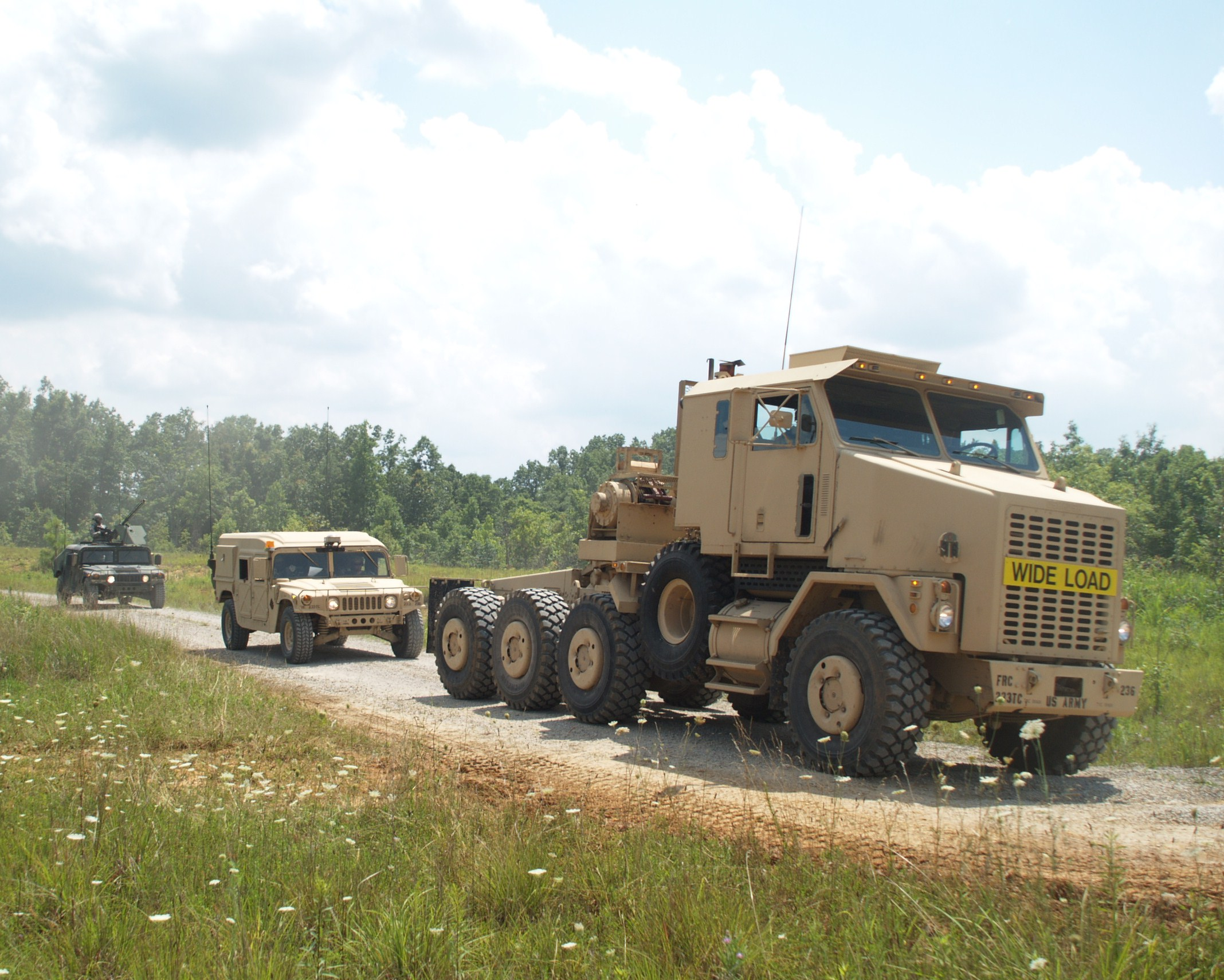
The relative size of the M1070 can be gauged against the Humvees following it.

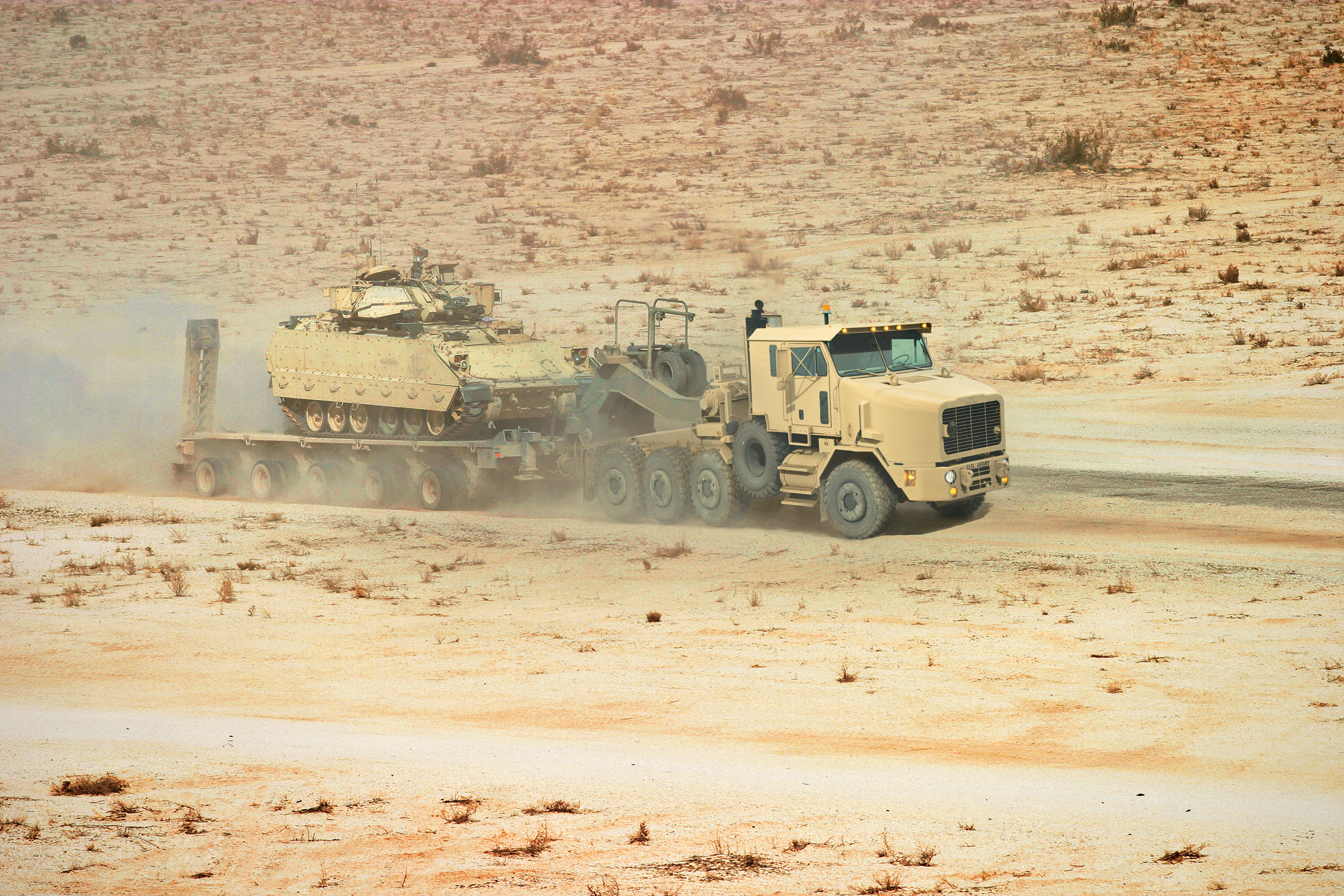
An Oshkosh M1070A1 HET and a DRS M1000 semi-trailer hauling a M2 Bradley IFV

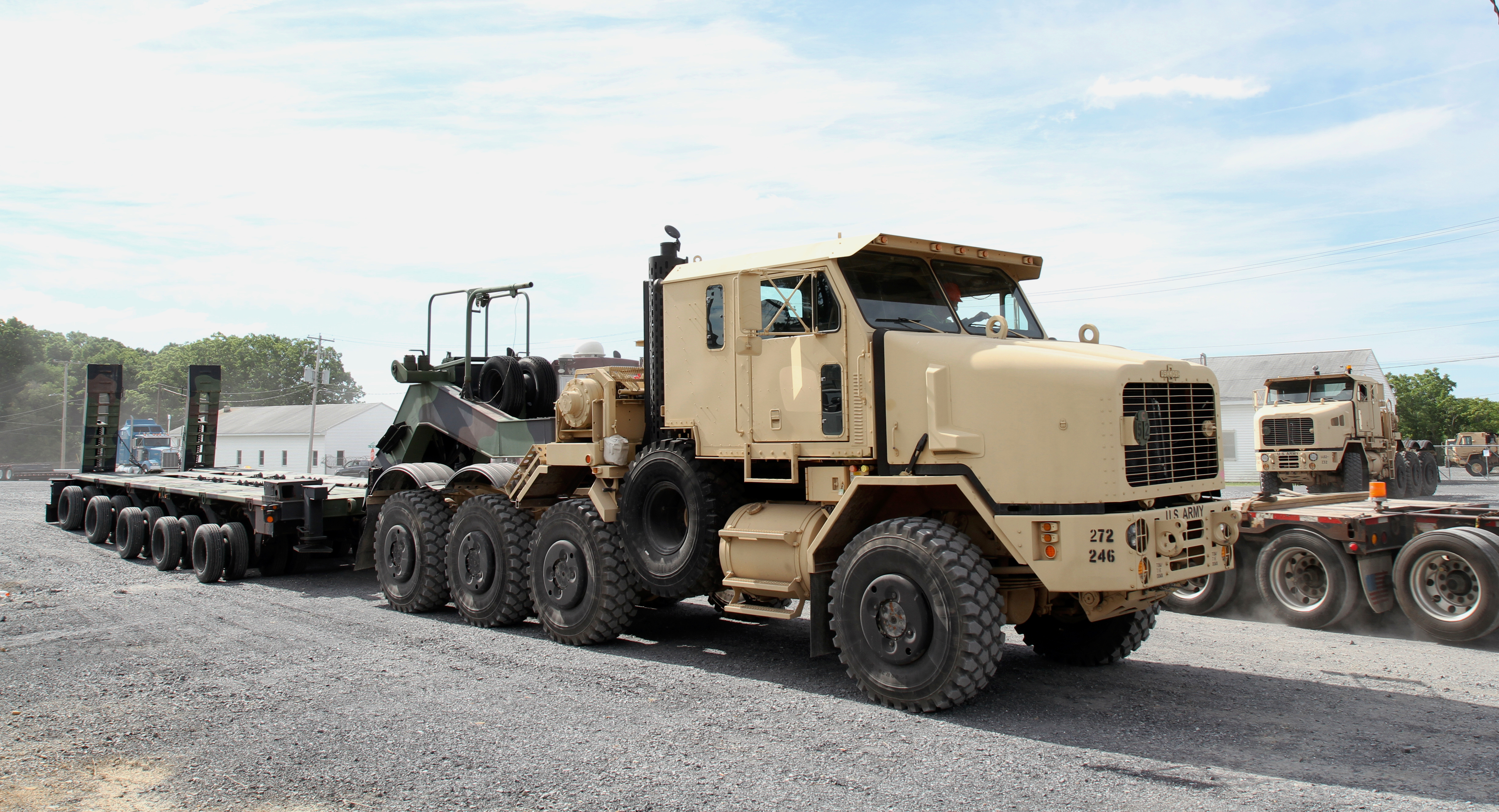
An Oshkosh M1070A1 HET and a DRS M1000 semi-trailer

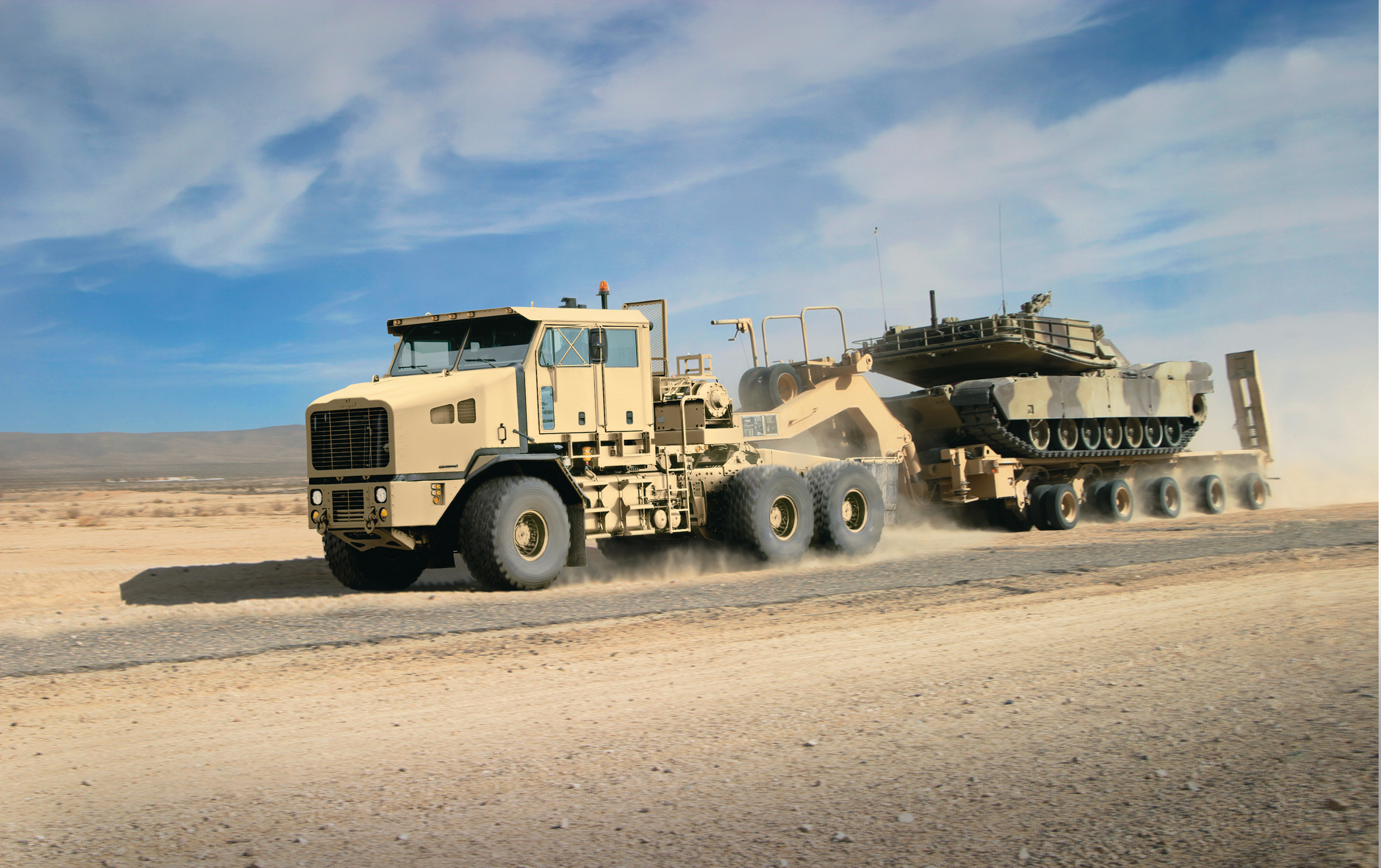
Oshkosh Defense unveiled the Global HET in 2008

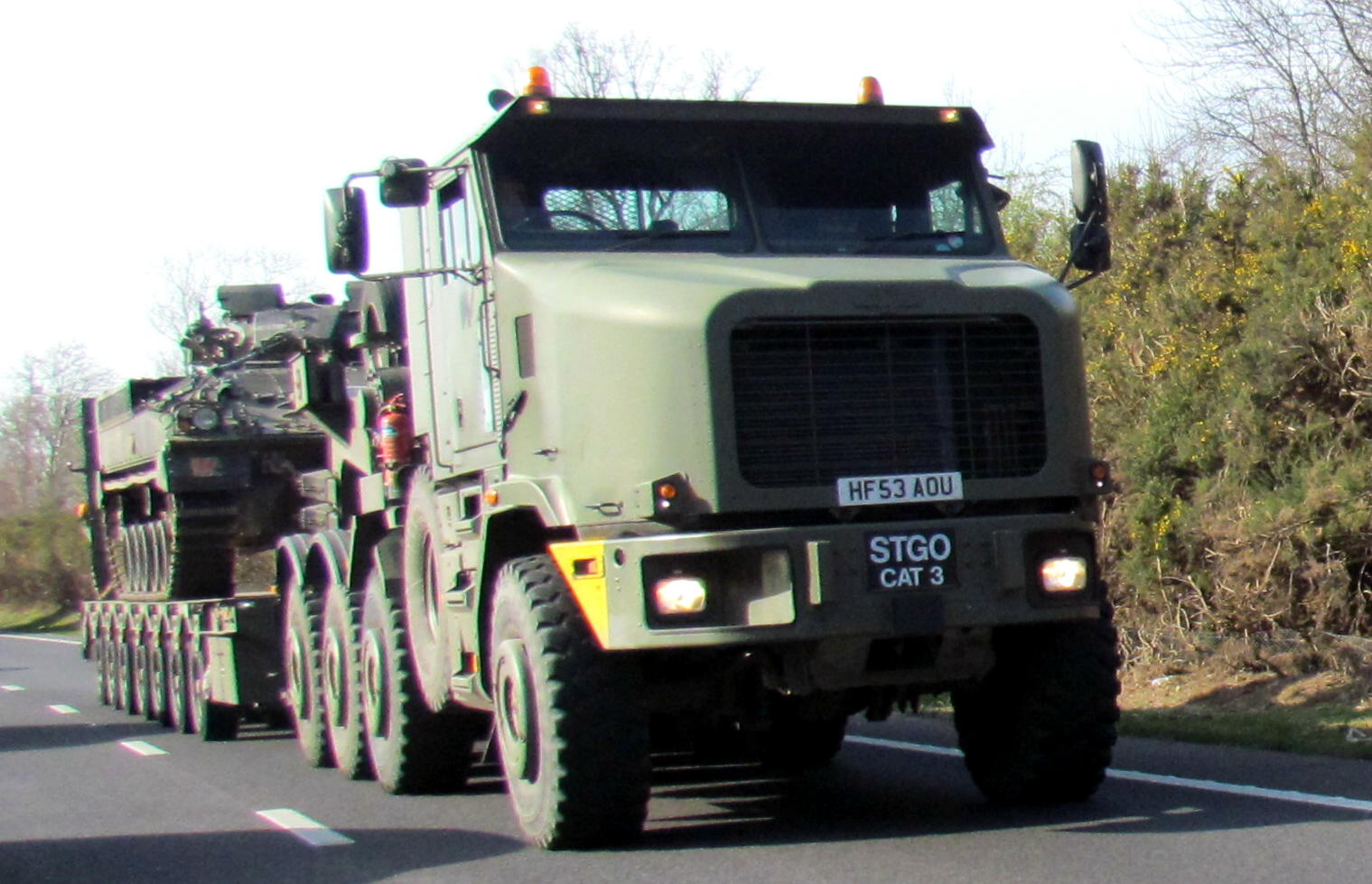
A British Army Oshkosh M1070F and a 7-axle King GTS 110/7 semi-trailer

== Operators ==
- Egypt (249 M1070A0 delivered) Egypt is the largest export user of the M1070. The first 170 vehicles were all delivered by December 2004. They were delivered on a one-for-one basis with Oshkosh 635NL five-axle semi-trailers. By late 2009 around 249 systems had been ordered. An award for M1070A1 to Egypt is pending.
- Iraq (60 M1070A0 delivered) Iraq had received 60 M1070 with 635NL semi-trailers by May 2011.
- Israel (37 M1000 delivered) Ordered in July 2007 and thought to be used with MAN tractor units.
- Jordan (50 M1070A0 delivered) Jordan ordered 50 M1070 with 635NL semi-trailers in 2003. These were delivered in 2004. Undisclosed quantity of M1070A1 ordered in March 2017 for delivery by December 2018.
- Morocco In July and August 2016 batches of 29 and 14 US surplus M1070 were delivered to Morocco via the Excess Defense Articles (EDA) programme, following an initial 20 M1070s delivered in April 2015.
- Oman Undisclosed quantity of M1070A1 ordered in March 2017 for delivery by December 2018.
- Romania Undisclosed number of M1300 ordered in 2023 as part of the contract for the M1A2 Abrams tanks.
- Saudi Arabia (50 M1070A0 delivered) Saudi Arabia was the first export customer for the M1070 with deliveries made during 1993.
- Taiwan (16 M1070A1 ordered in 2019)
- Ukraine (2 M1070 bought, 24 delivered by Germany)
- United Arab Emirates (20 est. Global HET delivered) In 2011 Oshkosh disclosed an order of undisclosed value from the UAE's Al Jaber Group for about 20 Global HET. Global HET was selected as a tractor unit for use with 70,000 kg semi-trailers mounting the locally developed Jobaria Multiple Launch Rocket System (MLRS).
- United Kingdom (92 M1070F delivered) Deliveries were completed early 2004. Normally used with a King GTS-100/7 semi-trailer. Broshuis heavy-duty 45,000 kg payload full-width semi-trailers procured for deployed operations.
- United States (2488 M1070A0 delivered) Production commenced 1992 from and deliveries ran until March 2003. 2,488 M1070A0 were delivered along with more than 2,600 M1000 semi-trailers. Tractors and trailers have been rebuilt following extensive service, and at least 1,009 tractors and more than 1,000 trailers have been returned to service in as-new condition. (1591 M1070A1 delivered) Fielding commenced in 2010 and deliveries concluded in December 2013.

== Television and film appearances ==
- Major Movie Star (2008).
- Red Dawn (2012).
- Tank Overhaul (2006-2009).
- Gold Rush (TV series) (2014-2019).
- Aussie Salvage Squad (TV series) (2018)

== See also ==
- Family of Medium Tactical Vehicles
- Heavy Equipment Transport System
- List of the United States military vehicles by model number
- List of United States Army tactical truck engines
- Logistics Vehicle System (LVS)
- Medium Tactical Vehicle Replacement
- MZKT-74135
- Oshkosh Corporation
- Oshkosh L-ATV
- Oshkosh M-ATV
- Palletized Load System
- Tank transporter
- TerraMax (vehicle)
