= Hets =

Hets or HETS may refer to:

- Het peoples
- Heavy Equipment Transport System, a military logistics vehicle
- Helicopter External Transport System
- Torment (1944 film) (Swedish: Hets)

== See also ==
- Het (disambiguation)
