= Transporter vehicle =

Vehicles that transport goods

Various types of vehicles may be known as Transporters:

on railways:

- Transporter wagon, for carrying railway wagons of one gauge on another gauge

on roads:

- Animal transporter, for livestock and other animals
- Self Propelled Modular Transporter, for general heavy road haulage
- Tank transporter, for military tanks over long distances

on other places:

- Crawler-transporter, for ground transport of spacecraft
- Transporter erector launcher, for military missiles
- Shipyard transporter, for sections of ship hulls and other heavy objects
