= 6 String Drag =

American musical group

6 String Drag is an American alt country band from Clemson, South Carolina.

6 String Drag was founded by Kenny Roby after leaving punk rock band The Lubricators in 1992. He initially founded a country cover band, the Welfare Liners, with Rob Keller (bass) and Ed Campbell (guitar, mandolin, keyboards); once the group began making original music, they changed the name to 6 String Drag, by which time the group had expanded to a sextet with Glenn Cannon on guitar, David "Pops" Wright on keyboards and horns, and Ray Duffey on drums.

The group released two albums in the mid-1990s and then disbanded in 1998; Roby began releasing under his own name and Keller began using the name Welfare Liners for his own bluegrass project. The group reunited in 2014 and began recording and playing shows again. Their latest release is Top of the World, issued in 2018.

== Discography ==
- 6 String Drag (Fundamental Records, 1996)
- High Hat (E Squared, 1997)
- The JAG Sessions - Rare & Unreleased 1996-1998 (Schoolkids Records, 2014)
- Roots Rock 'N' Roll (Royal Potato Family, 2015)
- Top of the World (Second Motion Records, 2018)
