= High hat =

High hat and variants may refer to:

== High hat ==
- Top hat, a tall, flat-crowned, broad-brimmed hat, worn by men
- High Hat (6 String Drag album)
- High Hat (Boy George album)
- Pareques acuminatus, a species of fish in the family Sciaenidae, also known as drums or croakers
- High-hat triplefin, a species of fish in the genus Enneapterygius
- High Hat (1927 film), an American film directed by James Ashmore Creelman
- High Hat (1937 film), an American film directed by Clifford Sanforth

== Hi-hat ==
- Hi-hat, a type of cymbal and stand, developed for and used as one of the standard components of a drum kit
- Hi hat (photography), a type of fixed tripod
- Hi-Hat (choreographer), choreographer of hip-hop dance from New York City
- Hi Hat, Kentucky, an unincorporated community in Floyd County, Kentucky, United States
- Hi-Hat (venue), a performance hall in Boston at which the Jazz at the Hi-Hat album by Sonny Stitt was recorded

== Hihat ==
- Stanley Hihat
