= Edifier (album) =

Studio album by Gravitar
- Released: 2001
- Recorded: November 1997
- Studio: 40 oz. Studios, San Francisco, CA
- Genre: Noise rock, psychedelic rock, space rock
- Length: 62:04
- Label: Manifold

Gravitar chronology
You Must First Learn to Draw the Real (1999)	Edifier (2001)	Freedom's Just Another Word for Never Getting Paid (2001)

Edifier is the fifth studio album by Gravitar, released in 2001 by Manifold Records.

== Track listing ==
All music is composed by Gravitar, except "Diana" by Alexander Lee "Skip" Spence.

No.	Title	Length
1.	"#1 11/22/97"	6:16
2.	"Diana" (Skip Spence cover)	6:30
3.	"Eskimo Angel"	11:10
4.	"#4 11/23/97"	5:17
5.	"#5 11/23/97"	5:04
6.	"Deep and Wide"	15:39
7.	"#2 11/22/97"	4:54
8.	"Rocket to Dearborn"	17:14

== Personnel ==
Adapted from the Edifier liner notes.

Gravitar

- Eric Cook – drums, editing, mastering
- Geoff Walker – vocals, electric guitar, horns, piano (4), cover art
- Michael J. Walker – electric guitar, acoustic guitar, piano (3)

Production and additional personnel

- John D'Agostini – editing, mastering
- Geoff Streadwick – recording, mixing, organ (2, 4), guitar (2, 4)

== Release history ==
Region	Date	Label	Format	Catalog
United States	2001	Manifold	CD	MANCD36
