= Aussie Salvage Squad =

- Genre: Factual television
- Country of origin: Australia
- Original language: English
- No. of seasons: 3
- No. of episodes: 28

Production
- Executive producers: Darren Chau, Craig Graham
- Producer: Fredbird Entertainment

Original release
- Network: 7mate

Aussie Salvage Squad is an Australian factual television series which explores the world of amateur marine salvage and rescue in Australia, which screened on 7mate in 2018. The first series was filmed in the Whitsundays, Queensland and looks at salvage work, which is a result of storms, cyclones and natural disaster carried out by marine rescue experts. The Salvage Squad relies on a variety of heavy equipment, including an old ford Maverick which out performs a $100k Mog and notably an Oshkosh M1070 tank transporter. Series 2 premiered on 20 May 2020 on the Discovery Channel.

== Cast ==
- Luke Purdy
- Jayde Towers
- Ellie Faranda
- Dan Miliauskas
- Jordan Verrel

== See also ==
- List of Australian television series
- Outback Truckers
