= Dragon Wagon =

Dragon Wagon may refer to:

- M25 tank transporter, tractor-trailer combination built by Paccar and used in World War II
- Heavy Expanded Mobility Tactical Truck, an American military transport vehicle
- Heavy Equipment Transport System, a military logistics vehicle

== See also ==
- Crescent Dragonwagon, an American writer
