= You Must First Learn to Draw the Real =

Studio album by Gravitar
- Released: November 9, 1999
- Recorded: 1996
- Studio: Gravitar's home studio, Detroit, MI
- Genre: Noise rock, psychedelic rock, space rock
- Length: 48:33
- Label: Monotremata
- Producer: Eric Cook, John D'Agostini

Gravitar chronology
Now the Road of Knives (1997)	You Must First Learn to Draw the Real (1999)	Edifier (2001)

Professional ratings
Review scores
Source	Rating
Allmusic	4/5 stars

You Must First Learn to Draw the Real is the fourth studio album by American noise rock band Gravitar. It was released on November 9, 1999 by Monotremata Records.

== Track listing ==
All music is composed by Gravitar.

No.	Title	Length
1.	"Night Dub"	10:28
2.	"U.R.R." (Uncle Rick's Revenge)	7:51
3.	"Rocket to Dearborn"	16:26
4.	"Blues for Charlie"	7:49
5.	"McCoy"	5:59

== Personnel ==
Adapted from the You Must First Learn to Draw the Real liner notes.

Gravitar

- Eric Cook – drums, percussion, production, mastering
- Geoff Walker – vocals, electric guitar
- Michael J. Walker – electric guitar

Production and additional personnel

- John D'Agostini – production, mastering

== Release history ==
Region	Date	Label	Format	Catalog
United States	1999	Monotremata	CD	MONOCD03
