= Hat (disambiguation) =

A hat is an item of clothing worn on the head.

Hat or HAT may also refer to:

== Film ==
- The Hat (film), a 1999 short film by Michèle Cournoyer
- The Hat, a 1912 film by Rollin S. Sturgeon
- The Hat, a 1963 film by Faith Hubley and John Hubley

== Mathematics ==
- Hat matrix, a mathematical operation in statistics
- Hat operator, notation used in mathematics
- Hat function, alternate name for the triangular function
- The hat tile, a solution to the einstein problem

== Organisations ==
- Handball Association of Thailand, governing body of handball in Thailand
- Hutchison Asia Telecom Group, a business division in telecommunications
- Hellenic Aeronautical Technologies, a Greek aeroplane manufacturer
- Helicopter Air Transport, a defunct American helicopter operator

== People ==
- Hat (High Priest of Osiris), the high priest of Osiris during the 19th dynasty of Ancient Egypt
- Jack McVitie (1932–1967), known as Jack "The Hat", English gangster
- Les Miles (born 1953), known as The Hat, American football coach
- Jan Åge Solstad (born 1969), known as Hat, former vocalist for the Norwegian black metal band Gorgoroth

== Places ==
- Hať, Moravian-Silesian Region, Czech Republic
- Hat, Azerbaijan
- Hat, Nepal
- Hat, Berehove Raion, Ukraine
- Hat District, Al Mahrah Governorate, Yemen
- Hat Island (disambiguation)

== Science ==
- Human African trypanosomiasis (sleeping sickness)
- HAt, symbol for hydrogen astatide
- Histone acetyltransferase, an enzyme class
- HAT medium, used in microbiology and immunology, for example in culturing hybridoma cells
- Hungarian-made Automated Telescope, used in the HATNet Project

== Technology ==
- Hardware Attached on Top, expansion board format for the Raspberry Pi computer.
- Hashed array tree, in computer programming.
- Help authoring tool, software for "help" documents.

== Other uses ==
- Handwoordeboek van die Afrikaanse Taal, an Afrikaans dictionary
- Haitian Creole language, with ISO 639-2 and 639-3 code hat
- Hat, slang for the caret (computing) (^)
- Hat, slang for the circumflex (ˆ)
- Hat (Davy Graham album), released in 1969
- Hat. (Mike Keneally album), released in 1992
- History Aptitude Test, an admissions test at Oxford University
- The Hat, a Southern California fast-food restaurant
- The Hat (book), a children's book by Tomi Ungerer
- Hat (comics), a supervillain from DC Comics
- "The Hat", an episode of Homicide: Life on the Street (season 4)
- "The Hat", an episode of Wander Over Yonder
- Hi-hat (instrument), a standard part of a drum kit
- Short for hatnote - WP:HAT (disambiguation)

== See also ==
- Hats (disambiguation)
- Hatt (disambiguation)
- Het (disambiguation)
- Hett (disambiguation)
- Mr. Hat
