= Fred Mills (American journalist) =

American music journalist

- Occupation: Journalist

Fred Mills is an American music journalist. He began his career as a writer for punk magazine Biohazard Informae in the late 1970s.

== Early life ==
Mills graduated from the University of North Carolina at Chapel.

== Career ==
After writing for The Bob, based in Wilmington, Delaware, in the early 1980s, Mills became music editor at Creative Loafing in Charlotte in 1987. He remained in that role for five years, while also working as a regional stringer for Billboard magazine, before joining Magnet magazine in 1994 as copy editor, columnist and reviews writer. He spent around a decade living in Tucson, Arizona, around this point, before returning to North Carolina in 2001. In 2006, he became online editor for Harp magazine. When Harp went out of business in 2008, he became a contributor and reviewer for Billboard.

In 2012, Mills became store manager and buyer for Schoolkids Records in the "Triangle" region of Raleigh–Durham–Chapel Hill, North Carolina. Three years later, he relocated to Asheville, where he became managine editor at Blurt magazine, a rebirth of Harp. He is also editor for Capital at Play.

He has also been a contributor for Bucketfull of Brains, Stereophile, Stomp & Stammer and Detroit Metro Times.

== Personal life ==
Mills has a son.

His favorite band is the Who, his favorite solo artist is Neil Young and his favorite song is "Shake Some Action" by the Flamin' Groovies.

== Bibliography ==
- Masters, Marc (August 31, 2013), "Live Dead Tree: A New Tumblr Revisits Old Zines", Pitchfork
