= Het =

Het or HET may refer to:

== Science and technology ==
- Hall-effect thruster, a type of ion thruster used for spacecraft propulsion
- Heavy Equipment Transporter, a vehicle in the US Army's Heavy Equipment Transport System
- Hobby–Eberly Telescope, an instrument at the University of Texas McDonald Observatory
- Human enhancement Technologies, devices for enhancing the abilities of human beings
- Heterozygote, a diploid organism with differing alleles at a genetic locus; see zygosity
- Hexaethyl tetraphosphate, in chemistry
- HET acid, alternate term for Chlorendic acid

== Other uses ==
- Het, a village in Hungary
- Het peoples, or their language
- Heterosexuality, sexual attraction to the opposite sex
- HighEnd Teen (2008–2017), a former Indonesian magazine
- Historical Enquiries Team (2005–2014), a former unit of the Police Service of Northern Ireland
- Holocaust Educational Trust, a British charity
- HET, IATA code for Hohhot Baita International Airport, in Inner Mongolia, China
- HET, former ticker symbol for Harrah's Entertainment, later renamed Caesars Entertainment Corporation, an American hotel and casino corporation
- HET, initialism for Hoofdklasse, Eerste klasse, Tweede klasse, the three divisions of Football in the Netherlands
- Heth, a letter of many Semitic alphabets
- Cyrillic spelling of the Russian word for no, pronounced "Nyet"
- HET, 80s Swiss Synthpunk band

== See also ==
- Hat (disambiguation)
- Heth (disambiguation)
- Hets (disambiguation)
- Hett (disambiguation)
