= Blurt (magazine) =

American music magazine

- Categories: Music magazine
- Founded: Summer 2008
- Country: United States
- Based in: Raleigh, North Carolina
- Language: English
- Website: blurtonline.com

Blurt is a music print magazine and online outlet originally based in Silver Spring, MD. The magazine was originally known as Harp Magazine for over 10 years, also based in Silver Spring, and was considered one of the best music magazines of the decade in the early 2000s. After Harp folded in March 2008 (at the behest of its parent company, which also owned JazzTimes, it declared bankruptcy), Blurt was founded by Harp owner Scott Crawford. Some of the main writers and editors for Harp also started Blurt with Crawford, including managing editor Fred Mills, senior editor Randy Harward (also an editor for the Salt Lake City weekly paper), and senior editor Andy Tennille (a journalist and photographer, currently the photographer for Tom Petty & the Heartbreakers).

Blurt's tag line is "Real Music, Real Artists, Real Opinions". Blurt is a highly respected outlet within the music industry and has often been cited by critics and fans as the Mojo magazine of the United States. It initially launched as an all-digital, downloadable online magazine, publishing five issues in that format before moving to print for the next nine issues while also posting each issue online, frequently with expanded content, at BlurtOnline.com. In early 2010, Crawford sold the Blurt assets to Stephen Judge of Second Motion Entertainment and the company moved to the label's home of Carrboro, NC. Second Motion Entertainment also owns the record label Second Motion Records which works with such artists as Australia's The Church, Bettie Serveert, Swervedriver, Parson Red Heads and Tommy Keene.

Blurt magazine announced in February 2012 that it would be relocating its offices (along with Second Motion) to Raleigh, NC, where Judge had purchased long-tenured independent record store Schoolkids Records. Editor Mills also relocated to Raleigh, assisting Judge in both running the store and publishing the magazine. As of April 2017, Schoolkids also operates locations in Durham, NC, and Carrboro, NC, and the Second Motion Records name has been changed to Schoolkids Records. The magazine, label and stores are increasingly integrated, operationally.

Blurt is updated daily with new music interviews, essays and features; music news, record release announcements (vinyl is a specialty), and tour dates; exclusive videos, audio streams and bootleg MP3s; record, DVD, book and concert reviews; and blog entries by Judge, Mills, John B. Moore, Michael Toland, and Bill Kopp. As a print magazine it was distributed throughout the United States and internationally. The final print issue was #14, published at the end of 2013 and featuring Artist of the Year Jason Isbell on the cover, along with features on The Beatles, Big Star, The Replacements, Megafaun, Tommy Keene and King Khan. At that point the magazine decided to revert to publishing online in the face of declining advertising revenue. While operating as a print publication, covers were devoted to artists such as: Sonic Youth, The Avett Brothers, PJ Harvey, Of Montreal, Janelle Monáe, Spiritualized Grizzly Bear and Wilco. From 2010 to 2016 the magazine also hosted an annual day party each March in Austin at the SXSW Music Festival at the Ginger Man Pub.
