= Chinga su Corazon =

1994 album by Gravitar

Studio album by Gravitar
- Released: 1994
- Recorded: 1993
- Studio: Electric Landlady Studio, Detroit, MI
- Genre: Noise rock
- Length: 66:46
- Label: Charnel
- Producer: John D'Agostini

Gravitar chronology
Chinga su Corazon (1994)	Gravitaativarravitar (1995)

Professional ratings
Review scores
Source	Rating
Allmusic	2.5/5 stars

Chinga su Corazon is the debut studio album by the noise rock band Gravitar. It was released in 1994 on Charnel Music.

== Track listing ==
All music is composed by Gravitar.

No.	Title	Length
1.	"Alpha-115"	15:42
2.	"Evil Monkey Boy"	4:38
3.	"Godspeed"	5:49
4.	"El Melveno"	4:34
5.	"Grasshopper"	2:17
6.	"One Fifth"	3:59
7.	"Bludgeon"	12:46
8.	"Moist"	17:01

== Personnel ==
Adapted from the Chinga su Corazon liner notes.

Gravitar

- Eric Cook – drums, percussion
- Harold Richardson – electric guitar
- Geoff Walker – clarinet, vocals

Production and additional personnel

- John D'Agostini – production, engineering
- Gravitar – production

== Release history ==
Region	Date	Label	Format	Catalog
United States	1994	Charnel	CD	CHCD-11
