= HAT LS2 =

LS2
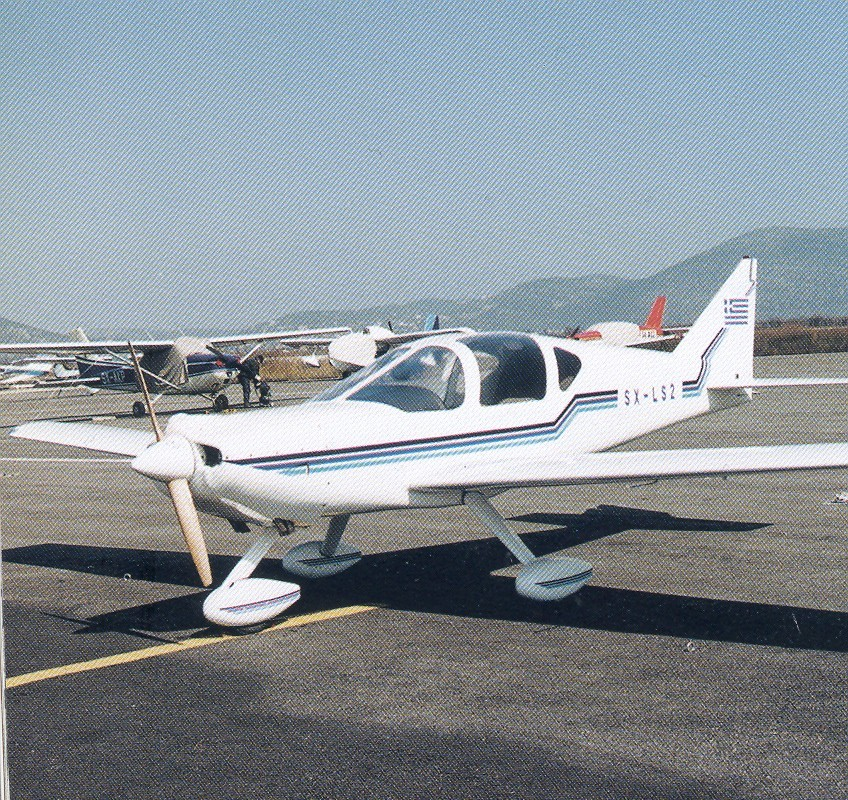

General information
- Type: Light aircraft
- National origin: Greece
- Manufacturer: Hellenic Aeronautical Technologies
- Designer: Anastasios Makrykostas

History
- First flight: 23 May, 1997

HAT LS2 (designation standing for "Landplane, Single engine, 2-seater) is a light airplane developed by Hellenic Aeronautical Technologies (HAT), a small Greek manufacturer of aerospace components. Design started in 1990 followed by prototype construction. After a temporary delay of the program, first flight of prototype (SX-LS2) was made on May 23, 1997. Air-worthiness certificate was awarded on September 2, 1999. The plane is a light two-seater sporting airplane constructed of fiber-reinforced composites, designed for sale in the form of construction plans.

== Specifications (LS2) ==
Data from

General characteristics

- Crew: 1
- Capacity: 2 pax
- Length: 5.58 m (18 ft 4 in)
- Wingspan: 8.2 m (26 ft 11 in)
- Height: 1.96 m (6 ft 5 in)
- Wing area: 8 m^{2} (86 sq ft)
- Airfoil: root: NACA 64-415; tip: NACA 64-412
- Empty weight: 307 kg (677 lb)
- Gross weight: 510 kg (1,124 lb)
- Powerplant: 1 × Volkswagen 4-cylinderair-cooled horizontally-opposed piston engine, 48 kW (64 hp)
- Propellers: 2-bladed

Performance

- Maximum speed: 233 km/h (145 mph, 126 kn)
- Range: 1,046 km (650 mi, 565 nmi)
- Rate of climb: 3.35 m/s (659 ft/min)
- Wing loading: 66.8 kg/m^{2} (13.7 lb/sq ft)
- Power/mass: 0.0894 kW/kg (0.0544 hp/lb)
