= Freedom's Just Another Word for Never Getting Paid =

Studio album by Gravitar
- Released: 2001
- Recorded: April 1997
- Studio: Dearborn, MI
- Genre: Noise rock, psychedelic rock, space rock
- Length: 61:33
- Label: Enterruption

Gravitar chronology
Edifier (2001)	Freedom's Just Another Word for Never Getting Paid (2001)

Professional ratings
Review scores
Source	Rating
Allmusic	4/5 stars

Freedom's Just Another Word for Never Getting Paid is the sixth studio album by Gravitar, released in 2001 by Enterruption.

== Track listing ==
All music is composed by Gravitar.

No.	Title	Length
1.	"Freedom's Just Another Word for Never Getting Paid"	15:45
2.	"Freedom's Just Another Word for Never Getting Paid"	15:45
3.	"Freedom's Just Another Word for Never Getting Paid"	8:03
4.	"Freedom's Just Another Word for Never Getting Paid"	15:50
5.	"Freedom's Just Another Word for Never Getting Paid"	6:10

== Personnel ==
Adapted from the Freedom's Just Another Word for Never Getting Paid liner notes.

Gravitar

- Eric Cook – drums, recording, mixing
- Geoff Walker – vocals, electric guitar, horns, recording
- Michael J. Walker – electric guitar

Production and additional personnel

- Anthony Skirvin – cover art
- William Rage – design

== Release history ==
Region	Date	Label	Format	Catalog
United States	2001	Enterruption	CD	Doc. 6
