= Now the Road of Knives =

Studio album by Gravitar
- Released: February 25, 1997
- Recorded: Time Stereo, Detroit, MI; 328 John, Ann Arbor, MI
- Genre: Noise rock, experimental rock
- Length: 71:57
- Label: Charnel
- Producer: John D'Agostini

Gravitar chronology
Gravitaativarravitar (1995)	Now the Road of Knives (1997)	You Must First Learn to Draw the Real (1999)

Professional ratings
Review scores
Source	Rating
Allmusic	4/5 stars

Now the Road of Knives is the third studio album by American noise rock band Gravitar, released on February 25, 1997, by Charnel Music.

== Track listing ==
All music is composed by Gravitar.

No.	Title	Length
1.	"McCoy"	4:01
2.	"Real Li"	14:23
3.	"Leelamau"	9:11
4.	"[untitled]"	1:28
5.	"Nellcotte"	4:50
6.	"[untitled]"	0:52
7.	"Catadrone"	5:17
8.	"[untitled]"	0:33
9.	"I Know"	8:13
10.	"Brain Circus"	3:44
11.	"G's Dub"	1:23
12.	"[untitled]"	1:26
13.	"Sleep Not With Those Ugly Shakes, But Steal the Diamond From Her Shadow"	2:47
14.	"Christmas Only Comes Once, Ever"	3:11
15.	"+LEE+19357-039"	10:38

== Personnel ==
Adapted from the Now the Road of Knives liner notes.

Gravitar

- Eric Cook – drums, percussion
- Geoff Walker – vocals
- Michael J. Walker – electric guitar

Production and additional personnel

- John D'Agostini – production
- Warren Defever – recording (1, 5, 7, 10, 11, 14, 15)
- DES – illustrations
- Gravitar – recording (2, 3, 9, 13)
- Geoff Streadwick – recording (13)

== Release history ==
Region	Date	Label	Format	Catalog
United States	1997	Charnel	CD	CHCD-24
