= Kenny Roby =

North Carolina-based singer-songwriter

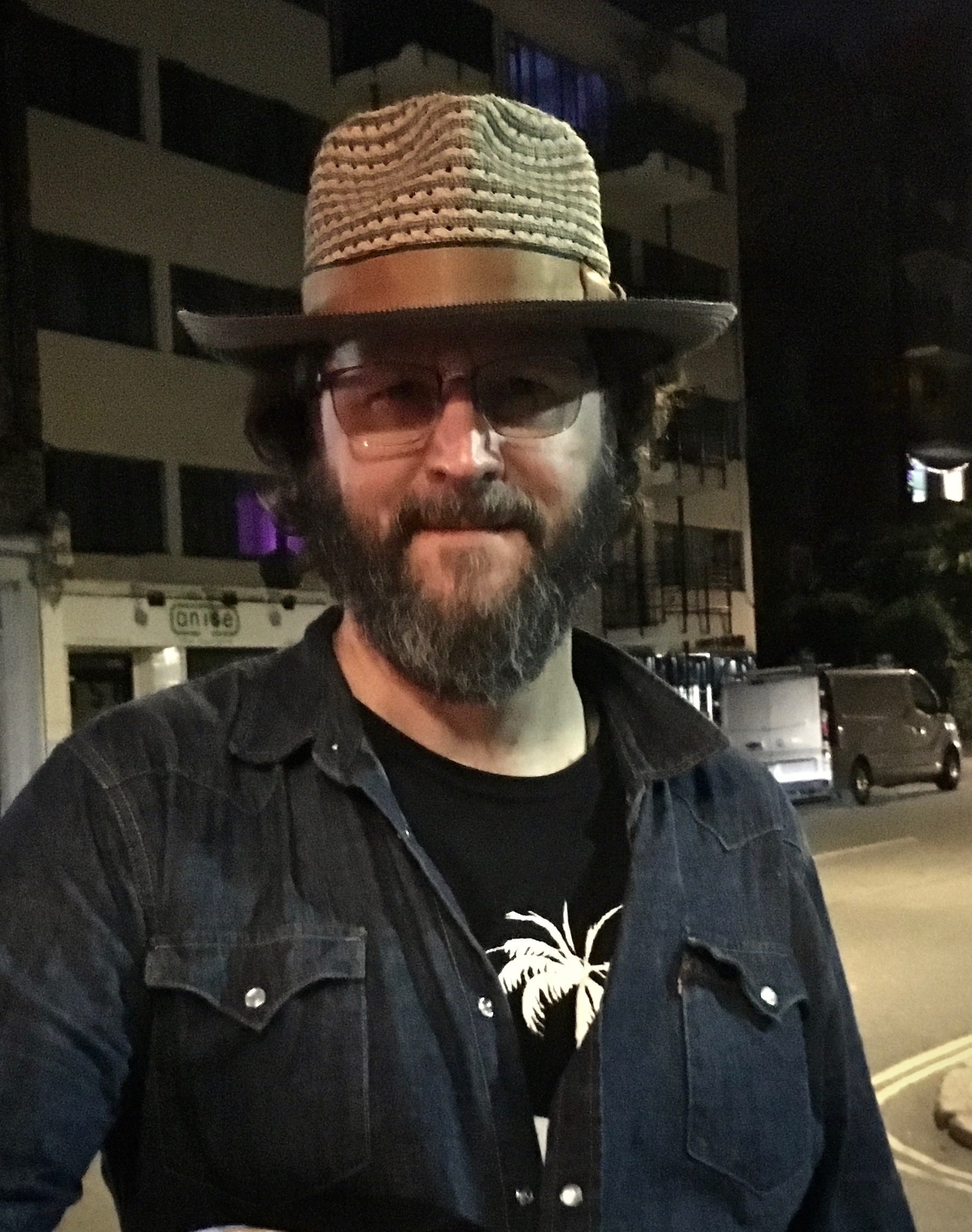
- Kenny Roby in Camden Town (2019)

Background information
- Occupations: singer-songwriter, guitarist, vocalist
- Years active: 1990s–present
- Formerly of: 6 String Drag

Kenny Roby is a singer-songwriter based in North Carolina. He was the former lead singer of 6 String Drag, which he formed with an old friend, bassist Rob Keller, in the early 1990s, with the intention of breaking into the new Americana movement. The band's style ranged from old-style country with hints of soul, gospel and rock. While 6 String Drag broke up in the late 1990s, Roby continues to make records and play live shows with the Mercy Filter, which includes Scott McCall of $2 Pistols.

== Biography ==
In 2013, Roby released the album Memories & Birds, which he described as "almost a concept album". This album was a reflection on his experiences in life as he turned 40 years old. In 2015, Roby reunited with the original members of 6 String Drag and released Roots Rock 'N' Roll, which Roby describes with "[the songs] kind of lent themselves to a 50’s and 60’s style." Roby's latest album is The Reservoir, released in 2020. The website Americana UK called the album "A sparse, personal narrative built on pain, loss, and the hardships of life."

== Discography ==
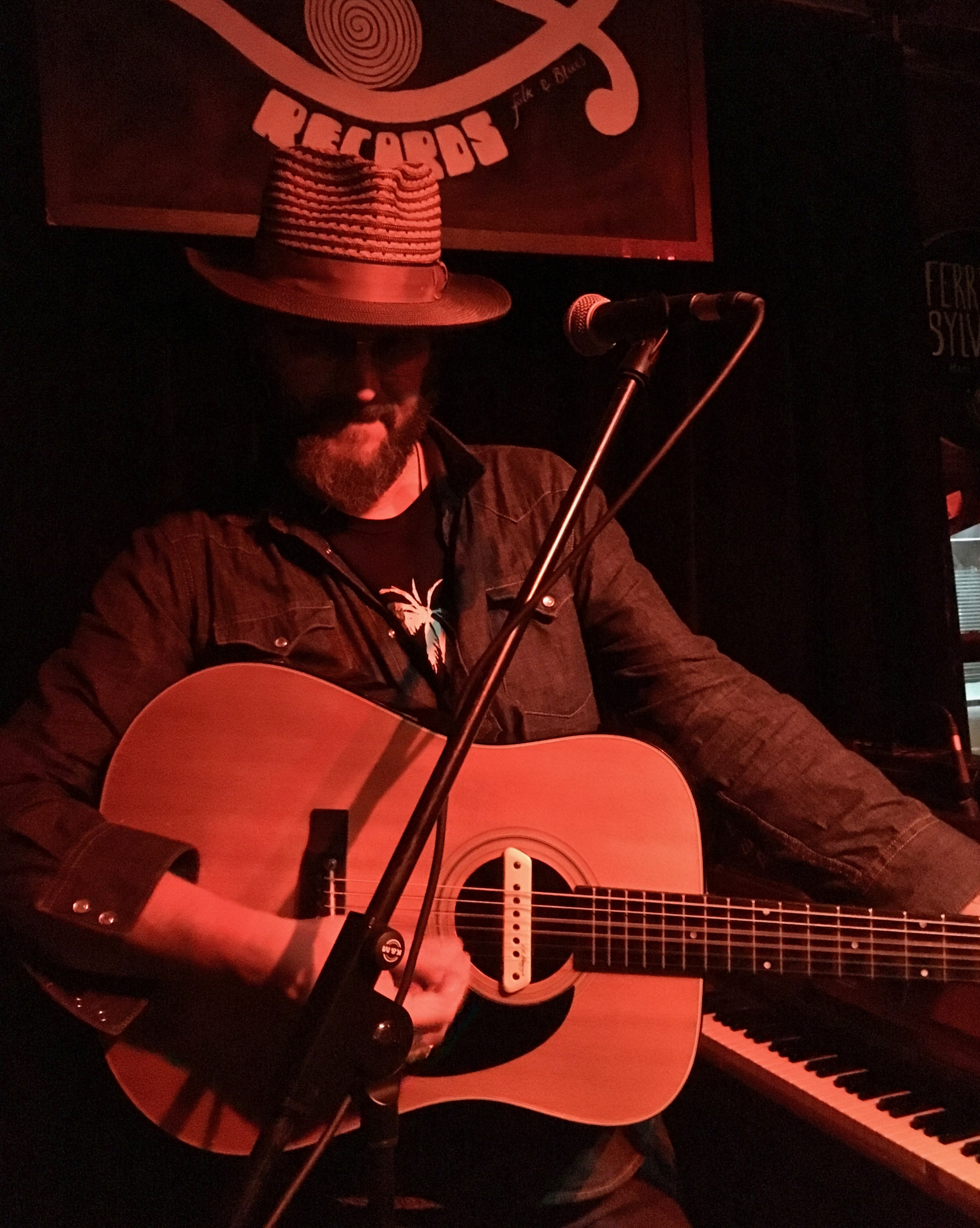
Kenny Roby at Spiritual Bar in Camden Town, London (2019).

=== With 6 String Drag ===
- 6 String Drag (1996)
- High Hat (1997)
- The JAG Sessions – Rare & Unreleased 1996-1998 (2014)
- Roots Rock 'N' Roll (2015)
- Top of the World (2018)

=== Solo ===
- Mercury's Blues (1999)
- Black River Sides (with Neal Casal, 1999)
- Rather Not Know (2002)
- The Mercy Filter (2006)
- Memories & Birds (2013)
- The Reservoir (2020)
- ”Kenny Roby” (2022)
