= Gravitaativarravitar =

Studio album by Gravitar
- Released: November 7, 1995
- Recorded: Electric Landlady Studio, Detroit, MI; 328 John and Halfway Inn., Ann Arbor, MI
- Genre: Noise rock, stoner rock
- Length: 58:37
- Label: Charnel
- Producer: John D'Agostini

Gravitar chronology
Chinga su Corazon (1994)	Gravitaativarravitar (1995)	Now the Road of Knives (1997)

Professional ratings
Review scores
Source	Rating
Allmusic	3/5 stars
Alternative Press	4/5 stars

Gravitaativarravitar is the second studio album by the rock band Gravitar. It was released on November 7, 1995, by Charnel Music.

== Track listing ==
All music is composed by Gravitar.

No.	Title	Length
1.	"Ostrich Bark"	1:57
2.	"Dust Devil"	5:37
3.	"Silver"	3:49
4.	"If Its Wrong to Be Right, Then Let Me Be Wrong"	8:44
5.	"Automaton"	7:20
6.	"Krug Calling Retik"	6:06
7.	"Why Is It So Hard?"	9:05
8.	"Strained"	5:41
9.	"Dirt Burglar"	10:18

== Personnel ==
Adapted from the Gravitaativarravitar liner notes.

Gravitar

- Eric Cook – drums, percussion
- Harold Richardson – electric guitar
- Geoff Walker – clarinet, vocals

Production and additional personnel

- John D'Agostini – production, engineering, mixing
- Gravitar – production
- Jeff Heikes – photography
- Haruo Satuo – additional guitar (9)
- Jeremy Sell – cover art, design
- Michael J. Walker – additional vocals (10)
- Matthew Watt – cover art, design

== Release history ==
Region	Date	Label	Format	Catalog
United States	1995	Charnel	CD	CHCD-17
