= Heavy Equipment Transport System =

US logistics vehicle

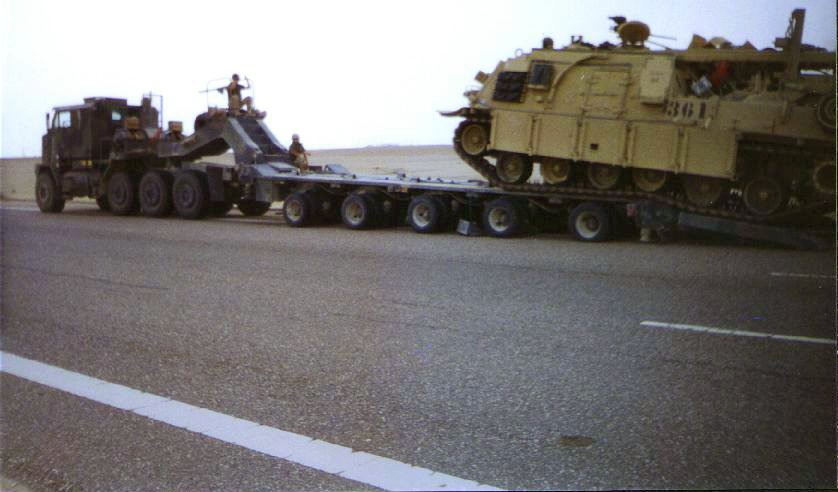
An Oshkosh M1070 with M1000 trailer loading an M88 Recovery Vehicle in southern Iraq

Heavy Equipment Transporter System (HETS) is the name of a U.S. Army logistics vehicle transport system, the primary purpose of which is to transport the M1 Abrams tank. It is also used to transport, deploy, and evacuate armored personnel carriers, self-propelled artillery, armored bulldozers, and other heavy vehicles and equipment.

The current U.S. Army vehicle used in this role is an Oshkosh-built M1070 tractor unit in A0 and A1 configurations which is coupled to a DRS Technologies M1000 semi-trailer. This combination replaced the earlier Oshkosh-built M911 tractor unit and M747 semi-trailer.

== M1070 and M1000 ==
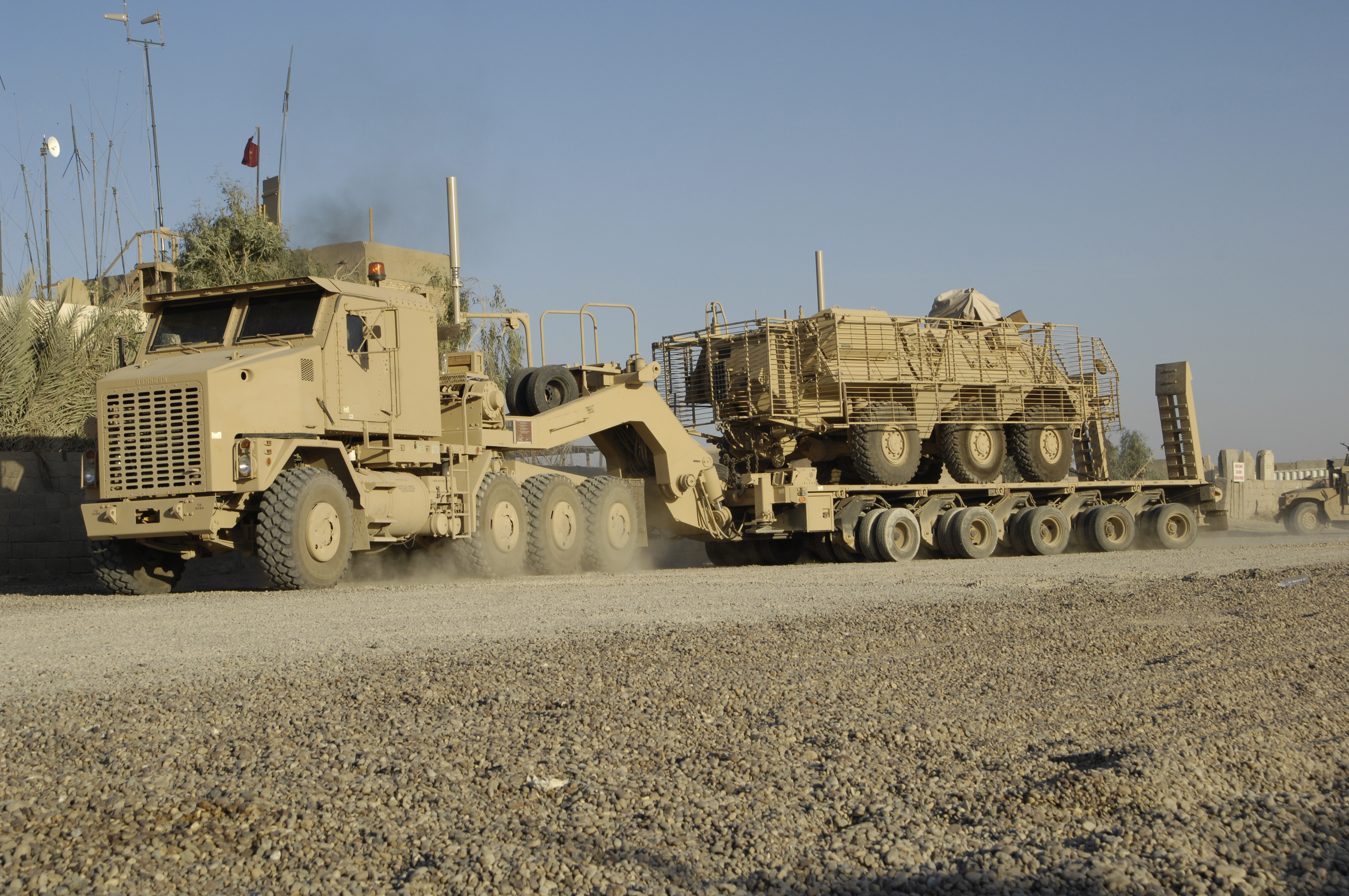
An Oshkosh M1070 8×8 Heavy Equipment Transporter (HET) tractor pulling a M1000 HETS trailer, carrying a slat-armored M93 Fox NBC detection vehicle near Baghdad, Iraq

To meet a US Army requirement for the transport of the M1 Abrams series main battle tank (MBT) Oshkosh Truck Corporation, now Oshkosh Defense, proposed the M1070. A contract for 1,044 M1070s was placed, with production commencing in July 1992. The final U.S. Army contract for the original A0 version called for 195 vehicles. These were delivered between March 2001 and March 2003. A total of 2,488 A0 versions were delivered to the U.S. Army. Following extensive use, some M1070s have been reset to the original build standard by Oshkosh.

The M1070E1 model was developed in the mid-1990s in conjunction with the U.S. Army as a possible Technology Insertion Program (TIP) for the M1070. No orders were placed.

In March 2008, Oshkosh Defense announced a contract award from the U.S. Army to begin engineering and initial production of the next-generation of HET. Oshkosh announced in October 2010 its first delivery order for the M1070A1 HET. Production of the M1070A1 concluded in August 2014, with 1,591 new vehicles built.

The M1000 trailer is used with the M1070A0 and M1070A1 tractors. The M1000 was originally developed as a private venture by Southwest Mobile Systems, later Systems & Electronics Inc (SEI), now DRS Technologies, as a response to a possible US Army requirement for transporting M1 and M1A1 MBTs. A production order for 1,066 M1000 units was placed by the U.S. Army in 1989. By July 2009 more than 2,600 M1000 trailers had been ordered.

- The M1070 and M1000 are both air-transportable by C-5 Galaxy or C-17 Globemaster III aircraft.
- The M1070 replaced the Scammell Commander as the British Army heavy tank transporter in 2001. The UK version (M1070F) is compliant with European legislation on emissions (EURO III).

== Previous heavy equipment transports ==
=== M25 tank transporter ===
The M25 tank transporter was a heavy tank transporter and tank recovery vehicle used in World War II and beyond by the US Army. Nicknamed the Dragon Wagon, the M25 was composed of a 6×6 armored tractor (M26) and 40-ton trailer (M15).

=== M746/M747 – M911/M747 ===
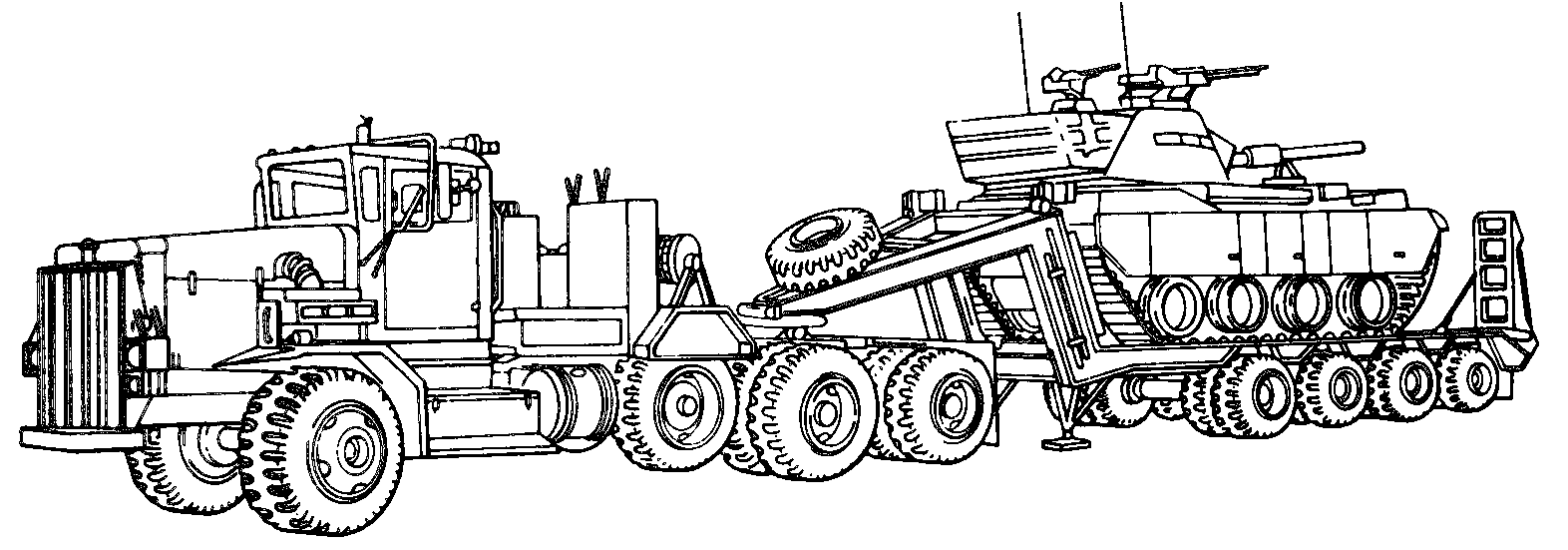
A M911 tractor and a M747 trailer with a M60 Patton tank

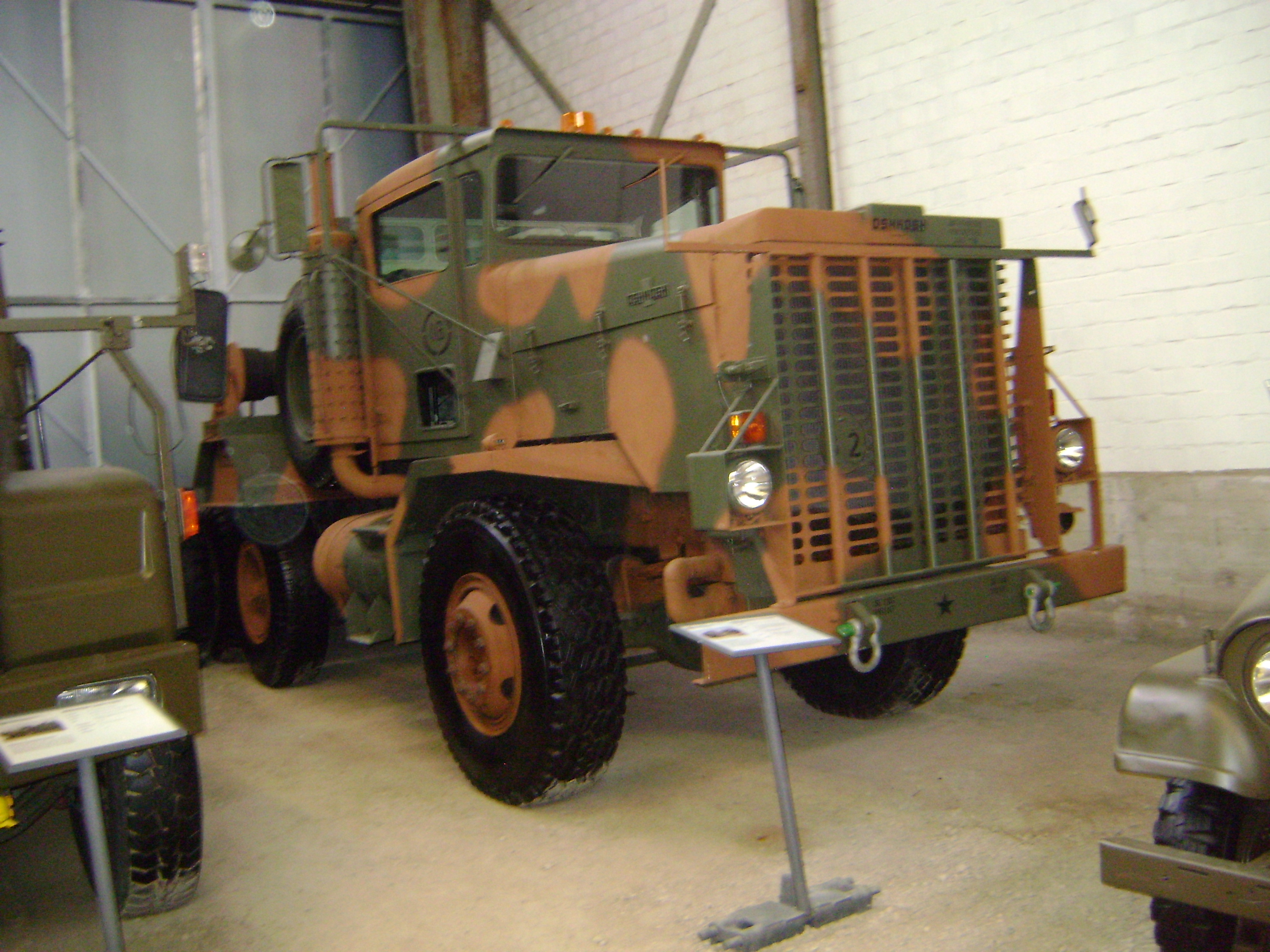
A M911 tractor at Schweizerisches Militärmuseum Full

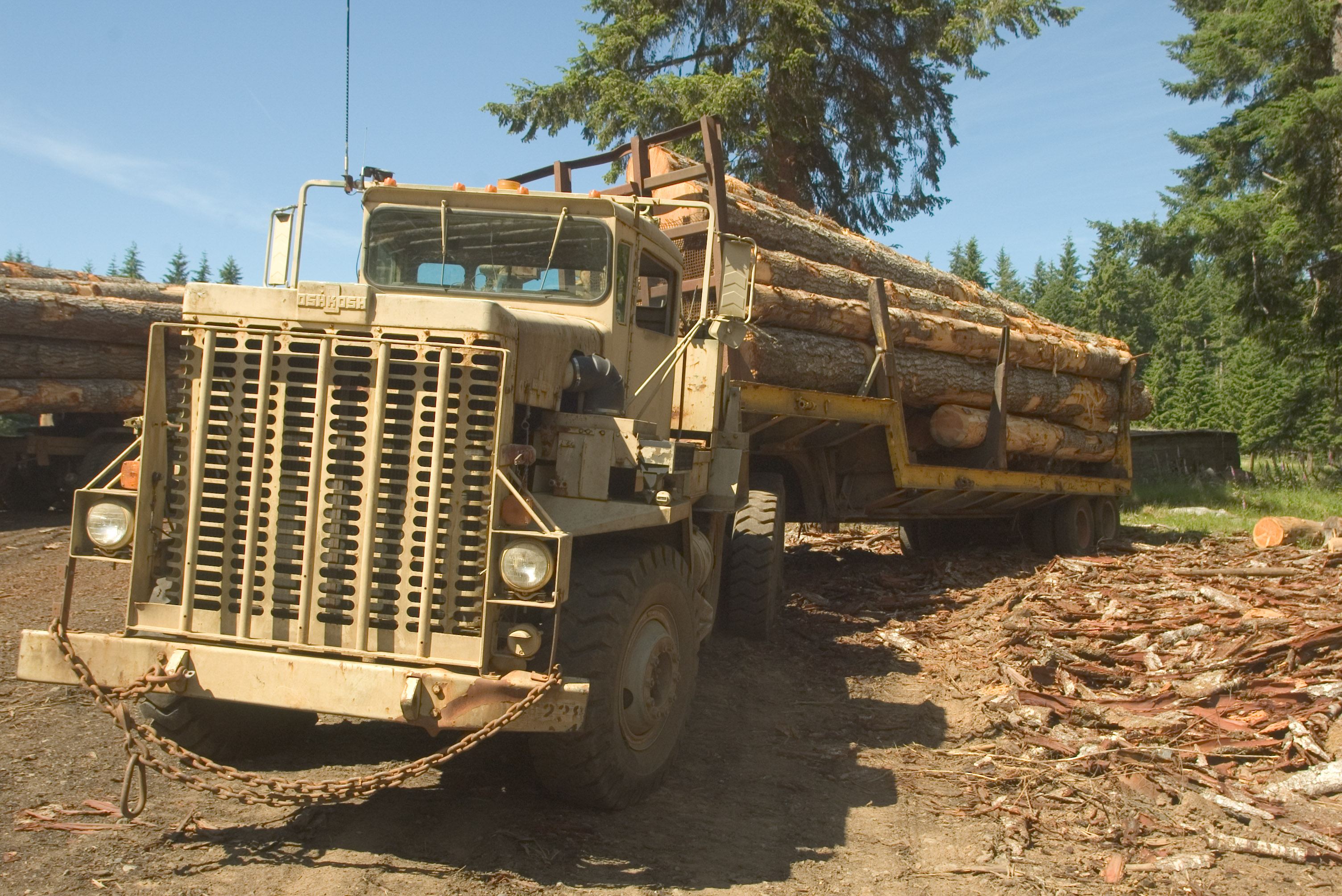
A Oshkosh M911 tractor hauling a load

Prior to 1993, the U.S. Army employed the Commercial Heavy Equipment Transporter (C-HET), which consisted of either the M746 or the M911 truck tractor and the M747 semitrailer.

- The M746 was an 8×8, 22 1/2-ton tractor built by Ward LaFrance from 1975 to 1977. Approximately 125-185 were built.
- The lift axle, 8×6, Oshkosh M911 superseded the M746 after 1977.

During operations Desert Shield and Desert Storm the M911 vehicles were employed primarily to haul M1 Abrams tanks. However, they demonstrated poor durability when loads exceeded 60 tons. Some are still serving as heavy transports of other military equipment, such as cargo handling equipment.

==== General characteristics ====
	M911 tractor	M746 tractor	M747 trailer
Length:	30 feet	27 feet	48.2 feet
Width:	9.5 feet	10 feet	11.5 feet
Height:	11.8 feet	10 feet	6.8 feet
Weight:	26.3 tons	25.8 tons	17.1 tons
Speed:	43 miles per hour	38 miles per hour	N/A
Range:	614 miles	200 miles	N/A
Crew:	2	2	N/A
Engine:	430 hp Detroit Diesel Series 92 (8V92TA)	12 cyl Detroit Diesel 12V71T, 600 bhp @ 2500 rpm	
Transmission:	5-speed automatic		N/A

== Operators ==
- Egypt (Oshkosh M1070)
- Greece (Oshkosh M911)
- Iraq (Oshkosh M1070)
- Israel (DRS M1000)
- Jordan (Oshkosh M1070
- Morocco (Oshkosh M911)
- Oman (Oshkosh M911)
- Saudi Arabia (Oshkosh M1070/Oshkosh M911)
- Sudan (Oshkosh M911)
- Thailand (Oshkosh M911)
- United Arab Emirates (Oshkosh Global HET)
- United Kingdom (Oshkosh 1070F)
- United States (Oshkosh M1070/Oshkosh M911)
- Yemen (Oshkosh M911)

== See also ==
- List of U.S. military vehicles by model number
- Dragon Wagon (disambiguation)
- SLT 50 Elefant
- Actros Armoured Heavy Support Vehicle System
- Shipyard transporter
