= Hexaethyl tetraphosphate =

Names
- Preferred IUPAC name Hexaethyl tetraphosphate
- Other names HETP; ethyl tetraphosphate, hexa-; Bladan Base

Identifiers
CAS Number	757-58-4
3D model (JSmol)	Interactive image
ChemSpider	12420
ECHA InfoCard	100.010.961
PubChem CID	12960
UNII	YL9WI50HOG
CompTox Dashboard (EPA)	DTXSID80862401
- InChI: InChI=1S/6C2H6.4H3O4P/c6*1-2;4*1-5(2,3)4/h6*1-2H3;4*(H3,1,2,3,4)/p-12 Key: DVNMJDOOCFYQAV-UHFFFAOYSA-B; InChI=1S/C12H30O13P4/c1-7-17-26(13,18-8-2)23-28(15,21-11-5)25-29(16, 22-12-6)24-27(14,19-9-3)20-10-4/h7-12H2,1-6H3 Key: DAJYZXUXDOSMCG-UHFFFAOYSA-N
- SMILES: [O-]P([O-])(=O)[O-].[O-]P([O-])([O-])=O.CC.CC.CC.CC.CC.CC.[O-]P([O-])([O-])=O.[O-]P([O-])([O-])=O

Properties
Chemical formula	C_{12}H_{30}P_{4}O_{13}
Molar mass	506.25 g/mol
Appearance	yellow to brown liquid
Density	1.331 g/cm^{3}
Melting point	−40 °C (−40 °F; 233 K)
Boiling point	467.01 °C (872.62 °F; 740.16 K)
Solubility in water	moderate
Solubility	most organic solvents
Refractive index (n_{D})	1.443

Hazards
- Occupational safety and health (OHS/OSH)
Main hazards	skin absorption; inhalation
Flash point	120.82 °C (249.48 °F; 393.97 K)

Related compounds
Related compounds	tetraethyl pyrophosphate pentaethyl triphosphate
- Except where otherwise noted, data are given for materials in their standard state (at 25 °C [77 °F], 100 kPa). Infobox references

Hexaethyl tetraphosphate (also known as HETP) is the organophosphorus compound with the chemical formula [(C_{2}H_{5}O)_{3}P_{2}O_{3}]_{2}O. The compound has not been isolated in pure form but appears to be a colorless liquid at room temperature. Commercial samples appear brown due to impurities. It is a constituent of the insecticide Bladan. In the 1940s, it was about as significant an insecticide as DDT and was referred to as "another of DDT's rivals for fame" in a 1948 book.

== Preparation, structure, and properties ==
Mixtures containing hexaethyl tetraphosphate are produced by heating diethyl ether and phosphorus pentoxide. The reaction entails cleavage of the C-O bond of the ether. The molecule contains three pyrophosphate bonds, which are the sites of high reactivity. The compound exists as two diastereomers, the meso- and dl-isomers.

Hexaethyl tetraphosphate does not burn readily. It is miscible and soluble in water. It is also soluble in a large number of organic solvents but not simple hydrocarbons. Hydride reducing agents, convert it to phosphine, a toxic gas. Hexaethyl tetraphosphate readily hydrolyzes to nontoxic products.

Since the material has not been obtained in pure form, the properties remain unverified.

Hexaethyl tetraphosphate does not noticeably corrode metals such as brass and iron. However, when a small amount of water is added to the chemical, it forms a strong acid and quickly corrodes galvanized iron and more slowly corrodes pure iron. Hexaethyl tetraphosphate diluted with 0.1% water has a pH of 2.5.

== Precautions and toxicity ==
Hexaethyl tetraphosphate can give off fumes that are toxic or corrosive if it is heated. Runoff containing the chemical can also lead to the pollution of waterways. Containers of it can also explode at high temperatures. If inhaled, swallowed, or absorbed via the skin, it can cause death. Mites, aphids, thrips, leafhoppers, and some types of caterpillars are highly susceptible to being poisoned by hexaethyl tetraphosphate. The chemical's toxicity to insects is not affected by whether it is made by the Scrader process or the Woodstock process. It is also very toxic to humans.

Out of 133 plant species that were tested for a reaction to hexaethyl tetraphosphate, only two types of plants were negatively affected. These were chrysanthemums and tomatoes.

The LD_{50} of hexaethyl tetraphosphate for thrips is 0.01%. 99% of aphids can be killed by a concentration of 1 to 2.5 grams of a 10% solution of the chemical in a 1000 cubic foot area. In one experiment, 100% of melon aphids were killed after exposure to an aqueous solution containing 0.025% hexaethyl tetraphosphate and 0.025% sodium lauryl sulfate. 99% of aphids can be killed by 0.3 grams of a 10% solution of the chemical in methyl chloride in 1000 cubic feet, and 100% of aphids can be killed by twice the amount of solution. 96% of apple aphids can be killed be exposure to an aqueous solution of 0.1% hexaethyl tetraphosphate and 0.05% sodium lauryl sulfate. Dust containing 3% hexaethyl tetraphosphate at a concentration of 40 pounds per acre can kill some bean aphids. 100% of cabbage aphids can be killed by an aqueous solution of 0.1% of the chemical and 0.05% sodium lauryl sulfate. Cabbage aphids can be quickly killed by a spray containing one pint of the chemical per 100 gallons of water.

100% of chrysanthemum aphids can be killed by an aqueous solution of 0.1% hexaethyl tetraphosphate and 0.05% sodium lauryl sulfate. 97% of chrysanthemum aphids can be killed by 3 grams of a 10% solution of the chemical in 1000 cubic feet. 100% of helianthus aphids can be killed by an aqueous solution containing 0.05% each of hexaethyl tetraphosphate and sodium lauryl sulfate. 94% of pea aphids can be killed by exposure for 24 hours to an emulsion containing a concentration of 2.4% of the chemical. 90% of potato aphids can be killed by exposure for 42 hours to a one pint of a 50% solution of the chemical in 100 gallons of water.

The effects of hexaethyl tetraphosphate on the cholinesterase of rat and cockroach tissue have been tested. It is considered less toxic than its analog TEPP:

Non-human LD_{50} of HETP vs. TEPP, mg/kg of body weight
Animal	rabbit, i. v.	rat, oral	rat, i. p.	rat, s. c.	mouse, oral	mouse, i. p.
HETP	0.69	7	2.5	0.64	56	6.1
TEPP	0.3	1.1	0.65	0.279	3	0.83

== Production ==
Hexaethyl tetraphosphate was first synthesised by the German chemist Gerhard Schrader, who reacted phosphorus oxychloride and triethyl orthophosphate at approximately 150 °C. This reaction is known as the Schrader process and was protected by a patent which Schrader filed in August 1938. The Germans also made hexaethyl tetraphosphate by phosphorus oxychloride and ethyl alcohol. This reaction requires slightly lower pressure than the Schrader process. The reaction has a chemical equation of POCl_{3} + 3(C_{2}H_{5})_{3}PO_{4} → (C_{2}H_{5})_{6}P_{4}O_{13} + 3C_{2}H_{5}Cl.

By 1947, hexaethyl tetraphosphate was being produced on a commercial scale. It cost US$1.10 per pound in the form of drums and $2.00 per pound in the form of carboys. In the 1940s, the chemical was commercially produced at concentrations of 50%.

Hexaethyl tetraphosphate's U.N. Shipping Number is 1611.

== Applications ==
Hexaethyl tetraphosphate is used as an insecticide, in particular, the insecticide Bladan. The Germans commonly used this chemical as an insecticide during World War II, when nicotine-based insecticides were not available.

== History ==
Hexaethyl tetraphosphate was first described by Schrader in 1938. It was discovered during research on chemical warfare agents. Americans first heard of the chemical after 1945, from two people named Hall and Kilgore. The United States began to produce the chemical in 1946.
