= Hellenic Aeronautical Technologies =

- Company type: Public
- Industry: Aerospace
- Founded: 1997; 29 years ago
- Headquarters: Athens, Greece
- Key people: Anastasios Makrykostas (Chairman, President, and CEO)
- Products: Small airplanes, aircraft parts
- Number of employees: 500

HAT (Hellenic Aeronautical Technologies) is a small Greek aerospace company based in Athens. Its founder, Anastasios Makrykostas has been an aerospace engineer in Hellenic Aerospace Industry. HAT specializes in aircraft parts made of composite materials. The first flight of its own developed aircraft, the HAT LS2, was made on May 23, 1997. It is a two-seater light aircraft with a 64 hp VW piston engine and maximum speed 233 km/h, designed for sale in the form of construction plans.
