= Hatt (surname) =

Hatt is a surname. Notable people with the surname include:

- Richard Hatt, businessman, judge and political figure in Upper Canada
- Emilie Demant Hatt (1873–1958), Danish artist
- Gudmund Hatt (1884–1960), Danish archaeologist
- Eliza Ruth Hatt (died 1892), mistress of William Henry Crossland and mother of his illegitimate son
- John Hatt, travel editor of Harper's and Queen, founder in 1982 of Eland Books
- Robert T. Hatt, naturalist and author, discoverer of Hatt's vesper rat
- Rona Hatt, Canada's first female chemical engineer.

== Fictional characters ==
- Sir Topham Hatt, the Fat Controller of Thomas the Tank Engine
