= Schoolkids Records =

Schoolkids Records is a retail indie record store based in the "Triangle" region of Raleigh-Durham-Chapel Hill, North Carolina. Founded in 1974, Schoolkids is an American-based music retail store that has up to seven stores throughout the eastern North Carolina region (Raleigh (2), Durham, Chapel Hill, Cary, and Greenville).

The store has often been located close to college and university campuses and focuses mostly on independent and college music, selling both vinyl and CDs, with the trend largely going back to more vinyl by 2012. Schoolkids has been known as the main record store for almost 40 years (until the other locations closed) around schools such as North Carolina State University, The University of North Carolina, Duke University, East Carolina University, The University Of North Carolina at Wilmington (still open), The University of Georgia, University of Tennessee, Indiana University, Ohio State University, Miami University, Virginia Tech, University of Michigan, and Michigan State University.

Artists who got their start selling records at Schoolkids include: Ryan Adams and Whiskeytown, Superchunk, Archers of Loaf, Ben Folds, The Connells, Polvo, Athenaeum and Squirrel Nut Zippers. The store was also one of the first retail outlets to sell No Depression magazine and to work with labels such as Merge Records, Mammoth Records and Yep Roc Records.

Schoolkids has often been confused with some of the other stores in the country with the same name, including "Schoolkids Records" and "Schoolkids in Exile" in Ann Arbor, Michigan, as well as other cities like Gainesville, Florida, but the stores were not connected.

== History ==
As of 2009, the main flagship store in Raleigh, North Carolina (across from NC State University), was the sole location still in business. In October 2013, the store announced it would relocate to the Mission Valley Shopping Center to make way for a destination hotel while expanding space for live music performances and to sell craft beers. In 2014, at their new location at the Mission Valley Shopping Center (on the south side of NC State's main campus), Schoolkids obtained an ABC license and started serving craft beers to their customers. The store became a store by day and a lounge-style bar/venue by night. All shows are free, though the store encourages customers to tip the band.

In July 2014, they hosted a 40th anniversary show at the Lincoln Theatre. The lineup included The DeBonzo Brothers, Hank Sinatra, Six String Drag, The Baseball Project, and Drivin N Cryin. The store also saw John Densmore of The Doors visit for a book signing in September. At year end, Schoolkids had seen its first growth year in almost 10 years with vinyl sales now accounting for 70% of the business, with a growth of 57% from 2013 to 2014. In 2016, Schoolkids reopened on Franklin Street in Chapel Hill, North Carolina, and continues to have two locations.

The store saw its highest level of sales in the early 1990s, when the independent music sector was with Nirvana.

== Awards ==
Schoolkids, a founding member of the CIMS Coalition, the Coalition of Independent Music Stores, has been named by both Time and The Grammys as one of the "top ten" record stores in the United States.

== See also ==
- Fred Mills, former manager and buyer at the store
