= Hett =

Hett may refer to:

- Hett, County Durham, England, a village and former civil parish

- Croxdale and Hett, later civil parish including Hett

- Hett, a nickname for the name Hettie

== People with the surname ==
- Benjamin Carter Hett, a historian of Germany and 2009 Guggenheim Fellowship winner
- Dan Hett (fl. 2021), British digital artist, brother of Martyn
- Geoffrey Hett (1909–1988), British fencer
- James Hett (born 1958), Canadian swimmer
- Martyn Hett (1987-2017), victim of Manchester Arena bombing and namesake of Martyn's Law, brother of Dan

== See also ==
- Het (disambiguation)
- Hat (disambiguation)
- Hats (disambiguation)
- Hatt (disambiguation)
