= Heth (surname) =

Heth is a surname. Notable people with the surname include:

- Henry Heth (1825–1899), career United States Army officer who became a Confederate general in the American Civil War
- Henry Heth, a prominent Virginia businessman
- Joice Heth (c. 1756 – 1836), African-American slave exhibited by P. T. Barnum with the false claim that she was the 161-year-old nursing "mammy" of George Washington
