= Shipyard transporter =

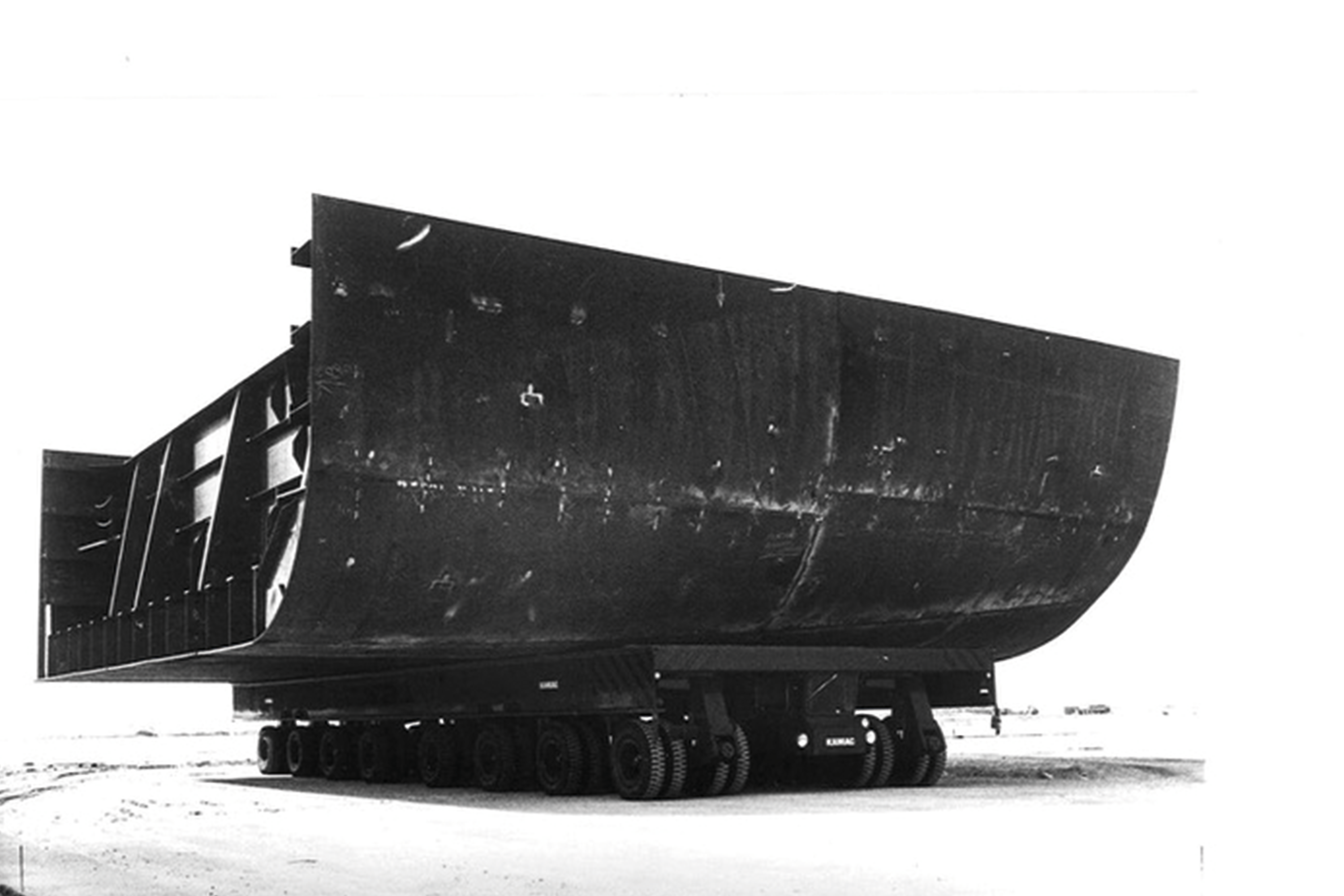
One of the first shipyard transporter from KAMAG (Transport Industry International) with capacity of 400 tons

A Shipyard transporter is a type of heavy equipment transporter commonly used in shipyards but is not limited to them. It typically transports large ship sections from a shipbuilder’s workshop to the dock, where they are assembled into a complete vessel.

Shipyard transporters adopt hydraulic suspension and steering to achieve loading, moving and steering. As each wheel has an independent steering unit, the shipyard transporter can achieve 8 direction moving and turning 360 degrees around the middle point of the transporter as the origin point.

It is also known as Self-Propelled Shipyard Transporter (SPET), Self-Propelled Modular Transporter (SPMT), Heavy-Duty Flatbed Transporter, or Industrial Transport Vehicle. These are powered by diesel engines or Electric motors, which helps them move hundreds of tons. The operator controls the vehicle from a cabin which is attached to the vehicle, which makes maneuverability easy. These are not only used at shipyards for ship building but also at seaports, heavy machinery production sites and wind turbine projects.

== Manufacturers ==
- Transporter Industry International
- Faymonville Group
- Enerpac

== Operators ==
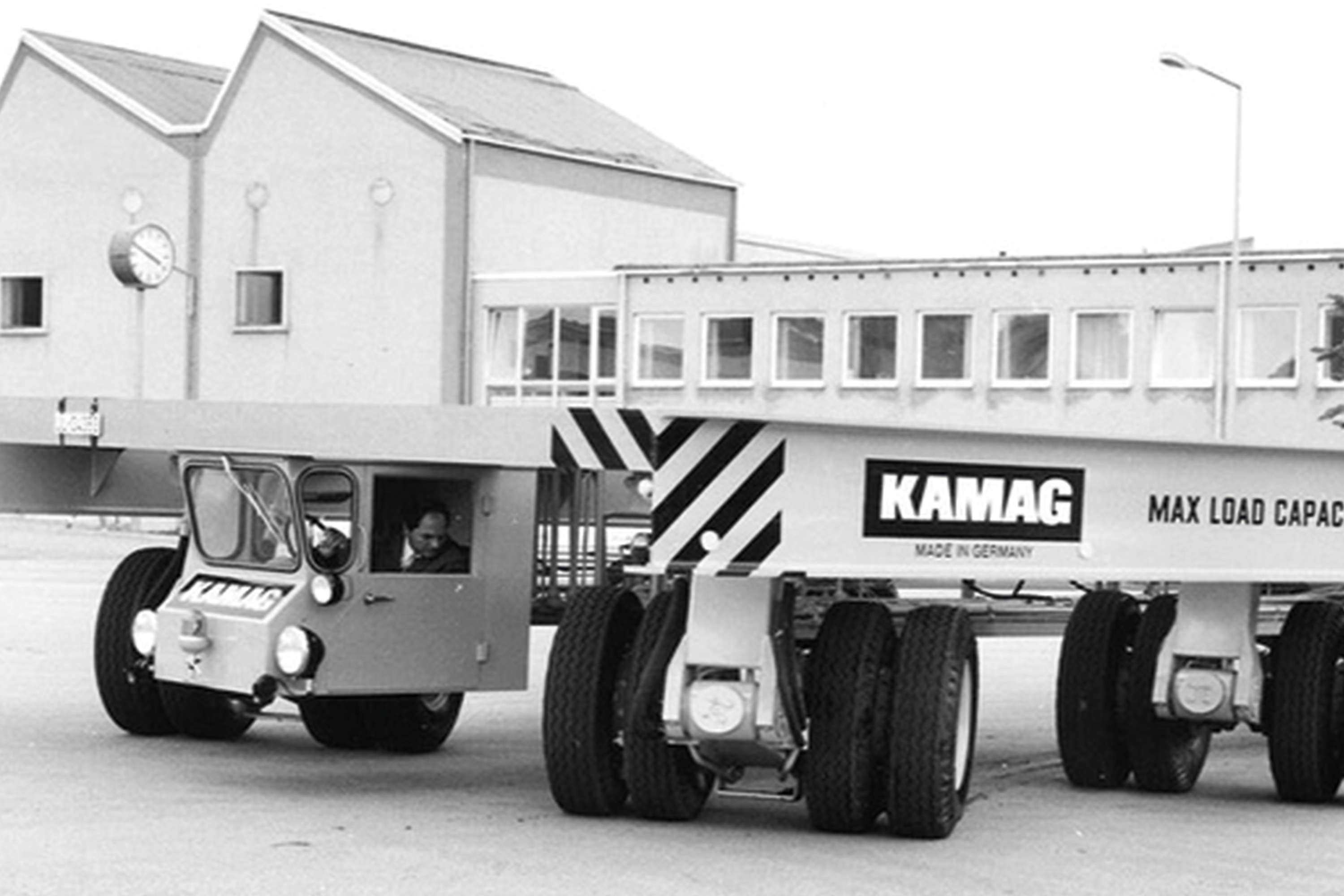
KAMAG shipyard transporter demonstrating steering system and cabin operation.

- Hyundai Heavy Industries
- Rauma Marine Constructions
- Heerema Marine Contractors
- Stocznia Szczecińska
- Fincantieri

== See also ==
- Heavy lift
- Hydraulic modular trailer
- Self-propelled modular transporter
- Gantry crane
- Heavy hauler
