= High Hat (6 String Drag album) =

Studio album by 6 String Drag
- Released: 1997
- Studios: Room & Board
- Label: E-Squared
- Producer: the twangtrust

6 String Drag chronology
6 String Drag (1994)	High Hat (1997)	The JAG Sessions – Rare & Unreleased 1996-1998 (2014)

High Hat is the second album by the American band 6 String Drag, released in 1997. The album cover was created by drummer Ray Duffey.

The band broke up the next year, before reuniting in the 2010s.

== Production ==
Recorded in Nashville, the album was produced by Steve Earle and Ray Kennedy, under their twangtrust production name. The band spent five weeks in the studio, over two sessions in late 1996 and early 1997.

The songs were written or cowritten by frontman Kenny Roby. "Over & Over" incorporates elements of Dixieland music. "Ghost" was recorded live, in one take. Earle guested on "I Can't Remember".

== Critical reception ==
Professional ratings
Review scores
Source	Rating
AllMusic	4/5 stars
The Baltimore Sun	3.5/4 stars
MusicHound Rock: The Essential Album Guide	4/5 stars
Orlando Sentinel	3/5 stars
St. Paul Pioneer Press	3.5/4 stars
The State	4/5 stars

The Chicago Reader determined that "the tunes are catchy and the execution is succinct, and while singer, guitarist, and primary songwriter Kenny Roby has yet to develop a distinct musical personality, he’s got the raw material to do so: his nasal croon carries him from fragile ballads into full-tilt rockers and his hooks sink in." The Washington City Paper concluded: "Like the Bottle Rockets, 6 String Drag plays country-tinged rock not only for the meaning but for the fun of it. In a Son Volt world, that’s a big deal; better to err on the side of the lightweight, as High Hat occasionally does, than to romanticize 12-pack-sodden gloom."

The Orlando Sentinel labeled "Elaine" "a pretty pop tune vaguely reminiscent of both Roy Orbison and the Everlys." Stereo Review stated that "6 String Drag fits into the alt-rock category but moves away from boring melodies, cryptic lyrics. and half-dead vocals to fuse a rootsrock/country fest of infectious hooks and literate writing that is not just winning but inspiring." The State deemed it "a gritty, rough-around-the-edges record that crackles with instrumental spontaneity and hearty singing." The St. Paul Pioneer Press praised the "endearing Junior Brown-goofiness."

AllMusic wrote that "6 String Drag expands their sound to include the influences of Dixieland and Stax/Volt-era soul; combined with their already impressive grasp of country and rock, High Hat is an exciting crazy-quilt of styles." Reviewing the 2018 reissue, Goldmine called High Hat "one of alt-country’s cornerstone albums."

== Track listing ==
No.	Title	Length
1.	"Bottle of Blues"
2.	"Elaine"
3.	"Gasoline Maybelline"
4.	"Guilty"
5.	"Red"
6.	"Driven Man"
7.	"From Me to Clayton"
8.	"Cold Steel Brace"
9.	"85 on 85"
10.	"Ghost"
11.	"I Can't Remember"
12.	"Over & Over"
13.	"Top of the Mountain"
14.	"Keep On Pushin'"
