= Oshkosh M911 =

Military vehicle

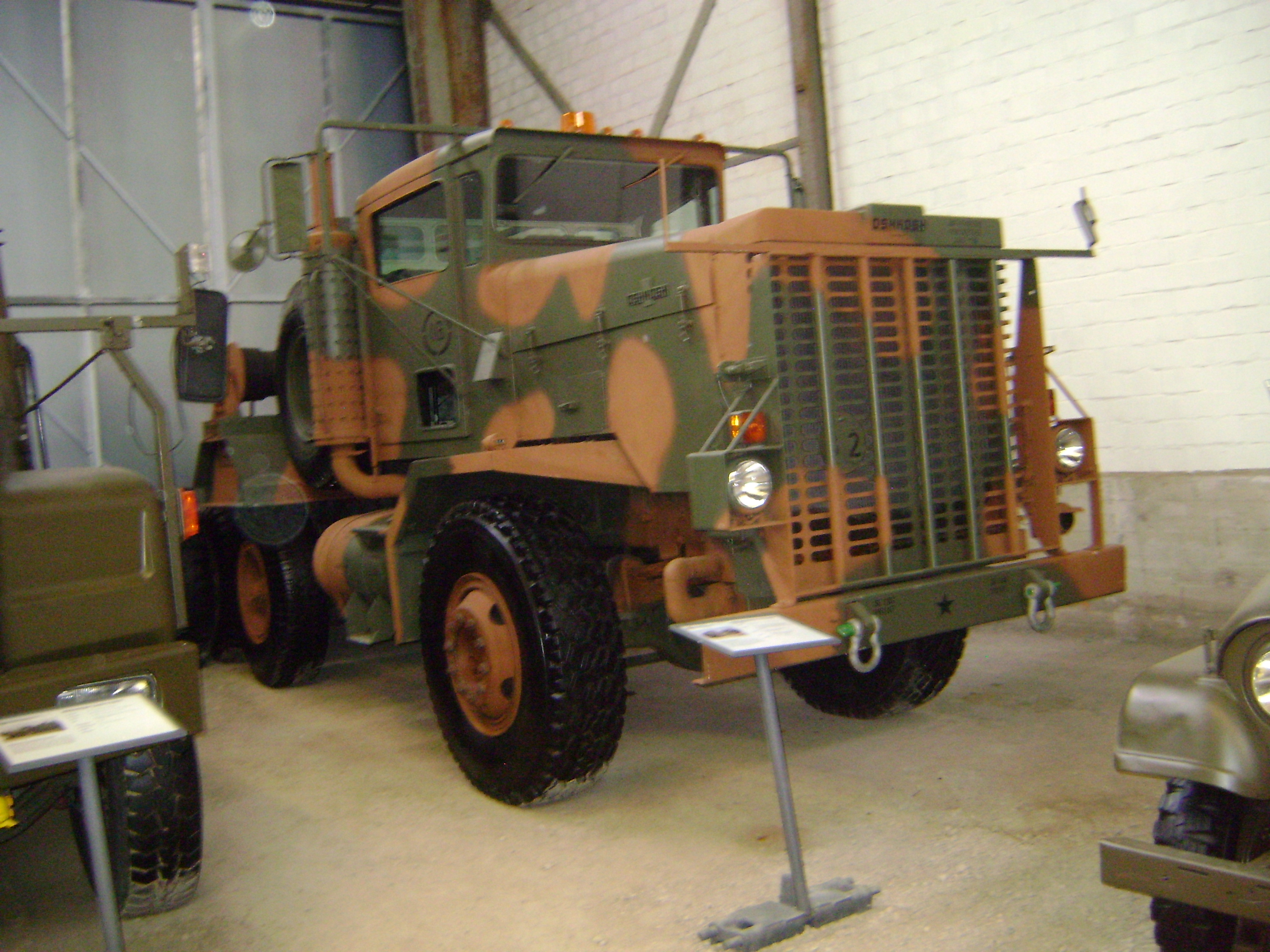
- Oshkosh M911 at the Schweizerisches Militärmuseum Full
- Place of origin: United States

Service history
- In service: 1970 - 1993
- Used by: US Army

Production history
- Designer: Oshkosh Corporation
- Manufacturer: Oshkosh Corporation
- Produced: 1970 -1992
- No. built: 1000

Specifications
- Mass: 18.2 t
- Engine: Detroit 8V92TA 8-cylinder V diesel engine with turbocharger, 12060 cm3 435 Hp
- Payload capacity: 68.95 t

The Oshkosh M911 (factory designation F2365) is a heavy-load truck produced by the Oshkosh Corporation in the 1970s, used by the US Army.

== History ==
In the second half of the 1970s, the US Army procured 1,000 of the heavy-haul truck – together with the four-axle M747 semitrailer – for road transportation of main battle tanks and other heavy loads. A tank often carried by the Oshkosh M911 was the M47 Patton. The Oshkosh M911 was also used with the US Army units stationed in Europe. The Oshkosh M911 has a crew of three, weighs 18.2 tons, and has a payload capacity of 68.95 tons. The Oshkosh M911 has a Detroit 8V92TA turbocharged 12-liter Diesel V-8 engine that produces 435 horsepower.

An Oshkosh M911 was exhibited at the Swiss Military Museum Full.

== Operators ==
- Greece
- Morocco
- Oman
- Saudi Arabia
- United States
