= John L. Grove =

American inventor and industrialist

- Born: John Landis Grove; January 26, 1921; Antrim Township, Pennsylvania, U.S.
- Died: June 16, 2003 (aged 82); Greencastle, Pennsylvania, U.S.
- Occupations: Inventor, industrialist and philanthropist
- Known for: Developed the hydraulic crane and access lift industries
- Spouse: Cora Isabelle (Wagner) Grove (1918-2005, m. 1943)
- Parent(s): John Franklin Grove (1890-1986) and Almeda (Landis) Grove (1891-1964)

John Landis Grove (January 26, 1921 – June 16, 2003) was an American inventor, industrialist and philanthropist. He became known, primarily, for developing the hydraulic crane and access lift industries.

Described as "the Babe Ruth of his industry," Grove was quoted as saying, "Don't allow wealth to stop your caring for others."

== Biography ==
Born near Mason-Dixon in Antrim Township, Pennsylvania, on January 26, 1921, John Landis Grove was a son of the Rev. John Franklin Grove (1890–1986) and Almeda (Landis) Grove (1891–1964). A 1938 graduate of Greencastle High School in Greencastle, Pennsylvania, he subsequently studied engineering at Drexel University. He and his older brother, Dwight, spent their formative years building farm wagons in Shady Grove, Pennsylvania.

During World War II, Grove married Cora Isabelle Wagner and served as a member of the medical corps in the United States Army.

After returning home from the war, Grove co-founded the Grove Manufacturing Company with his brother, Dwight, in 1946. Needing a method of moving heavy steel for the wagons, Grove used his knowledge of hydraulics to develop a rudimentary crane. Dealer interest in Grove's crane inspired his decision to produce the first mobile hydraulic industrial cranes. That decision quickly transformed the company from a manufacturer of farm implements to a world leader in the crane market. In the late 1950s, Grove's work with Paul K. Shockey developed an all-steel hydraulic extension ladder for use on fire trucks. Within Grove Manufacturing, John Grove oversaw the crane division while his brother, Dwight, dealt with farm equipment operations.

Rapid growth, primarily due to demand for the hydraulic cranes, resulted in the company expanding to over 1,000 employees by 1967. That same year, against John Grove's wishes, Grove Manufacturing was sold to the Walter Kidde Company. Internal strife between the brothers, and possible health issues, prompted John Grove to leave the company in 1968.

In 1969, John Grove and Paul Shockey launched Condor Industries, and began manufacturing self-propelled, telescoping hydraulic aerial 'cherry-picker' style lifts, primarily for the aircraft maintenance industry. In 1973, Condor Industries was renamed JLG Industries (JLG for John L. Grove). With innovative products and designs, such as mounting lifts on track-driven frames, locating the crane operators cab on the turret, less expensive truck mounted cranes, and scissor-type lifts, JLG Industries grew to over 700 employees and attained 30 million in sales by the late 1970s.

In 1987, he delivered the Commencement Address at Shippensburg University, during which he told the graduating class:

"Carry forward your responsibilities to society in order to leave this world better than you found it. Don't allow wealth to stop your caring for others. Don't allow your head to grow larger than your heart. Be willing to sacrifice for things that you desire and in which you believe, and don't ask more of others than you would of yourself."

His company, JLG, became in 2006 part of Oshkosh Corporation. By the end of his career, John Grove held over 60 patents.

== Illness, death and interment ==
Ailing for the final two years of his life, Grove died at the age of eighty-two at his home in Greencastle, Pennsylvania on June 16, 2003. He was buried at the Cedar Hill Cemetery in Greencastle.

== Philanthropy and legacy ==
Grove served as president of the Shippensburg University Foundation from 1981 to 1985. During that time, he oversaw the first capital campaign in the university's history, which was also the first capital campaign ever undertaken within the Pennsylvania State System of Higher Education. As a result of his leadership, Shippensburg University's endowment grew from $800,000 to more than $10,000,000.

Director of the First Maryland Bancorp and its subsidiary, the First National Bank of Maryland, Grove was also a member of that bank's Western Maryland regional advisory board, the boards of directors of Falling Spring Corporation, National Equipment Services, Sentry Trust, Truckcraft Corporation, and United Telephone's eastern group, and was also the founder of, and first to endow, the Greencastle Antrim Foundation.

In 1993, Grove became one of the first ten people inducted into the Construction Equipment Hall of Fame.

The John L. Grove College of Business at Shippensburg University of Pennsylvania was named in his honor in 1993, following the donation to the university, by Grove and his wife, of two million dollars.

In 2002, Grove was awarded the first Lifetime Achievement Award by Greencastle-Antrim Chamber of Commerce.

In addition, Grove and his wife, Cora I. (Wagner) Grove, provided financial support for the construction of the John L. Grove Medical Center in Greencastle, and donated land to the Boy Scouts of America, which later became Camp Sinoquipe.
