= JLG Industries =

American manufacturer of high-level access equipment

JLG Industries, Inc.
- Company type: Subsidiary
- Industry: Access Equipment
- Founded: 1969
- Headquarters: McConnellsburg, Pennsylvania, U.S.
- Key people: Mahesh Narang, President
- Products: Aerial Work Platforms and Telehandlers
- Brands: Gradall (1999 - 2006) - Sold to Alamo Group Lull (2003 - 2015) - Discontinued Skytrak (2003 - Present)
- Parent: Oshkosh Corporation
- Website: www.jlg.com

JLG Industries, Inc., a subsidiary of Oshkosh Corporation, is an American designer, manufacturer, and marketer of access equipment, including aerial work platforms and telehandlers. JLG is headquartered in McConnellsburg, Pennsylvania, United States. The company's products are used in various industries such as construction, fit-outs, industrial maintenance, material handling, and facilities maintenance. JLG was founded in 1969 and operated independently until its acquisition by Oshkosh Corporation in 2006.

== History ==
Founded in 1969, John Landis Grove formed a partnership with two close friends and purchased a small metal fabrication business in McConnellsburg, Pennsylvania. With a team of 20 workers, they constructed and sold the first JLG aerial work platform in 1970. Many of the fundamental design elements of the original lift are still being incorporated into products today.

Since becoming a part of the Oshkosh Corporation Company in late 2006, JLG has had four appointed presidents: Craig E. Paylor, Wilson Jones, Frank Nerenhausen and Mahesh Narang, who is the current president since November 2023.

== Markets ==
JLG distributors serve the industrial, commercial, institutional, and construction markets worldwide.

== Locations ==
JLG has five manufacturing facilities in the United States, as well as four facilities worldwide. These include locations in Leicester, United Kingdom; Fauillet, France; Leon, Mexico; Tianjin, China; Maryland and Pennsylvania, United States. The company provides sales and service support in the United States, Latin America, Canada, England, Sweden, Spain, Scotland, Poland, Russia, The Netherlands, Italy, Germany, France, Hong Kong, China, Australia, and New Zealand.

== Products ==
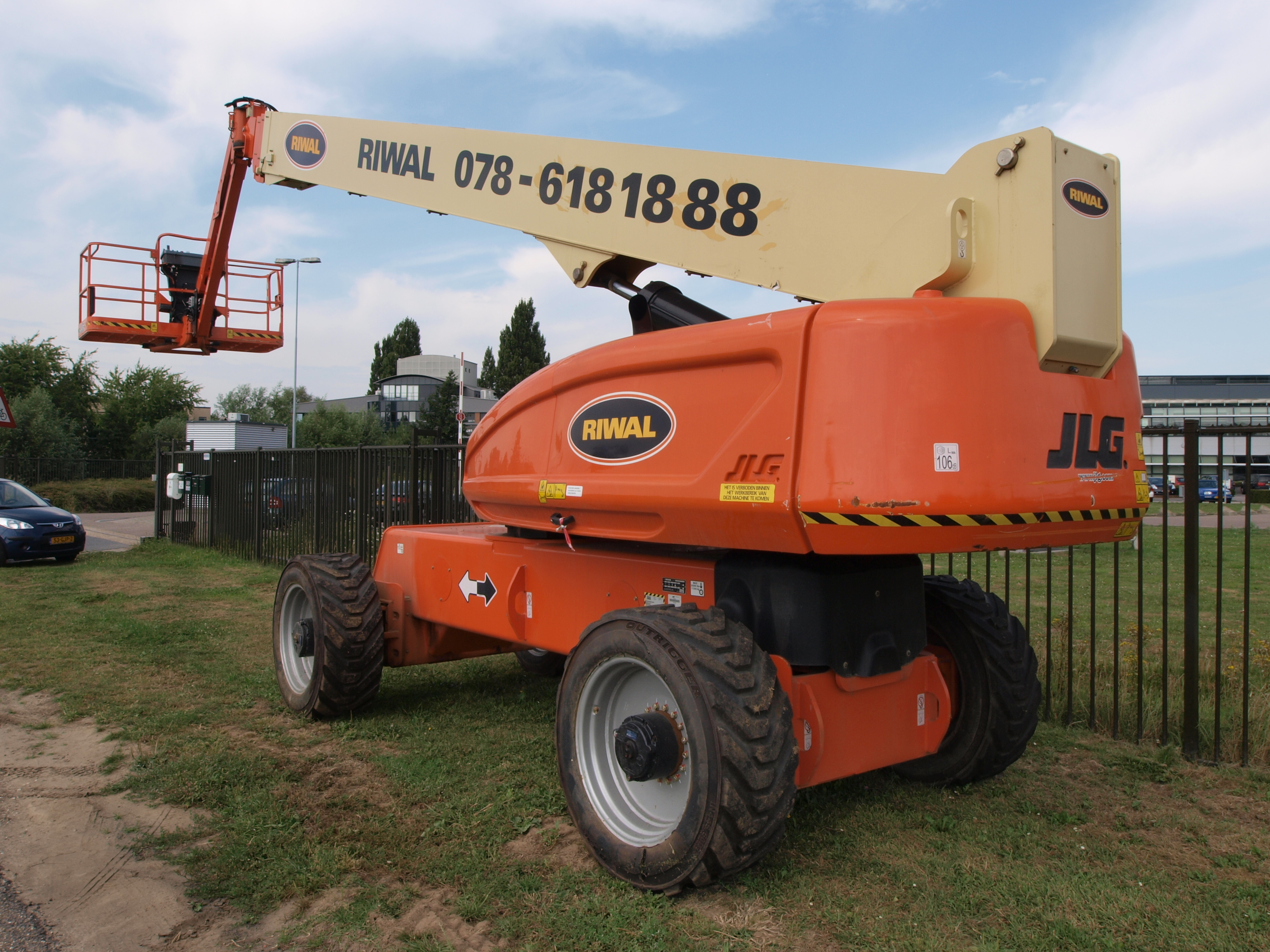
JLG 1200SJP Boom Lift

JLG introduced its first scissor lift in 1973, and in 1979, scissor lift production began in JLG's Bedford, Pennsylvania location. The firm's current product line includes the following types of items:

- Mast booms and boom lifts (aerial work platforms)
- Towable & trailer mounted boom lift trucks and telehandlers
- Vertical mast lifts
- Combustion powered scissor lifts
- Personal portable lifts (LiftPod)
- Low Level Access (Peco and Ecolift, Nano and Power Tower, as added with the purchase of the UK company Power Towers Ltd. in 2015)

Aerial Work Platforms

- Electric boom lifts and Engine-powered boom lifts
  - JLG electric-powered and engine-powered aerial work platforms are designed for a variety of job sites, such as steel mills and chemical plants, airports, convention centers, shipyards and heavy construction. There are models with lift heights ranging from 30 feet to 185 feet, the world's tallest self-propelled aerial work platform. JLG's QuikStik boom design delivers fast cycle speeds of 115 seconds from ground to elevation. In addition, JLG Ultra Series boom lifts come with the only oscillating axle in their boom class, providing enhanced mobility. The Ultra Booms also have a full-time four-wheel drive for reliable traction. In 2011, JLG introduced the 1500SJ, which is the first straight boom lift that takes workers to 150 feet without an oversized load permit (an overweight permit is required for highway transportation).
- Scissor lifts
  - JLG scissor lifts are available as both electric and engine-powered. The electric-powered scissor lifts can be used both indoors and outside whereas the engine-powered lifts are used exclusively outdoors in rough terrain and applications that require more workspace and lifting capacity.

Telehandlers: JLG, Lull and SkyTrak

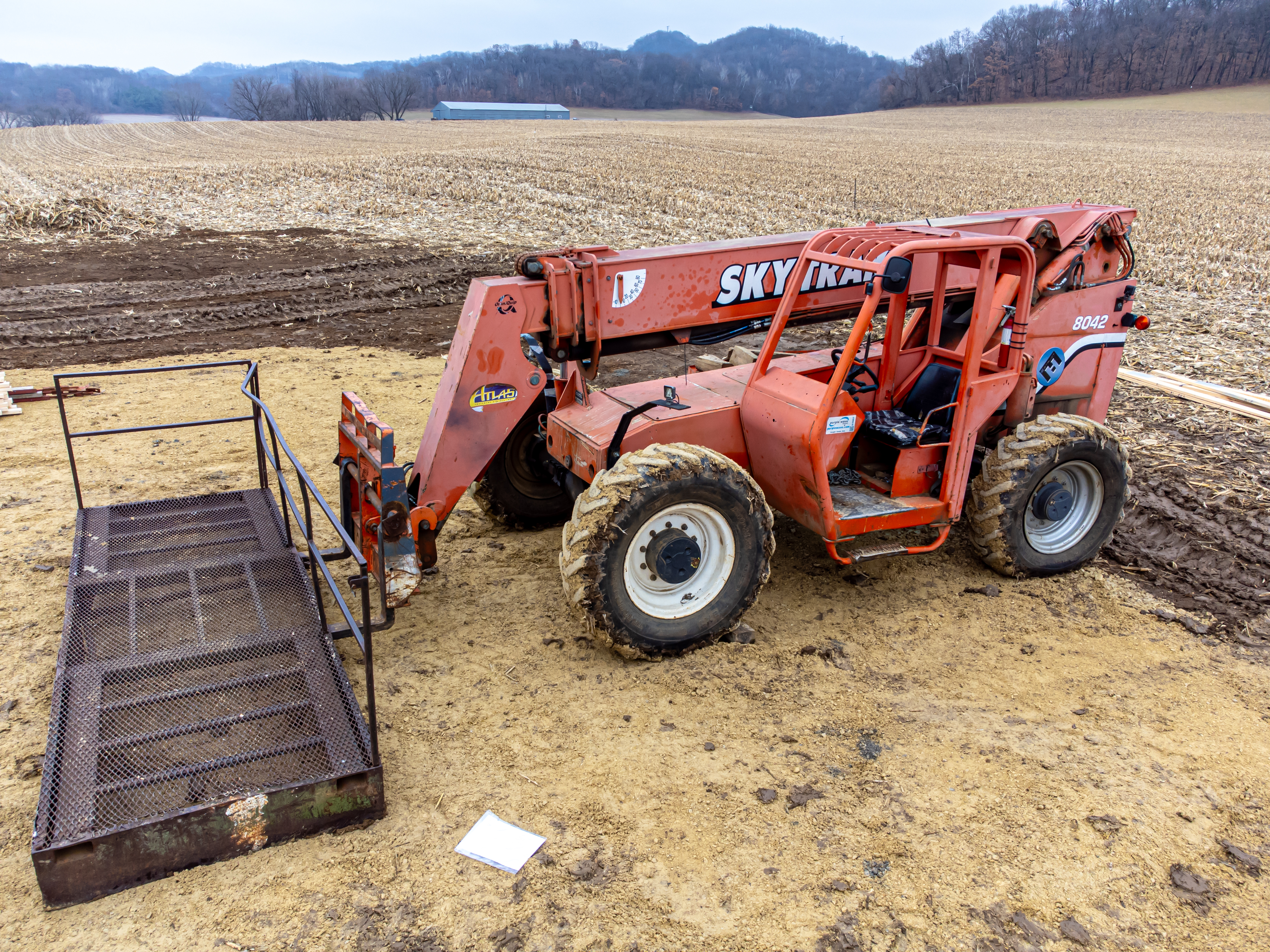
SkyTrack boom lift with work platform

JLG offers three brands of commercial telescopic handlers: JLG, SkyTrak and Lull, which feature all-wheel steering, including two-wheel, four-wheel circle and four-wheel crab to meet various maneuverability requirements. Lull telehandlers have a unique precision placement system called a traversing boom. JLG telehandlers have capacities from 5,500 to 17,000 pounds and heights up to 55 feet. The telehandlers come with a wide variety of attachments to assist with challenges on the job site. JLG telehandlers feature Tier 4i and tier 4 final diesel engines, which meet the EPA's Tier 4 emission standards for nonroad diesel engines. These standards allow for a higher level of fuel efficiency and a reduced impact on the environment.

JLG acquired SkyTrak and Lull in 2003. The last Lull-branded telehandlers were offered in 2015 and are no longer made.

Military Telehandlers

- ATLAS
- ATLAS II
- MMV

Drop-deck Trailers: (Triple-L trailers)

- Utility
- Flatbed
- Enclosed
