= Oshkosh Striker =

Airport Rescue Fire Fighting Vehicle built by Oshkosh Corporation

Striker
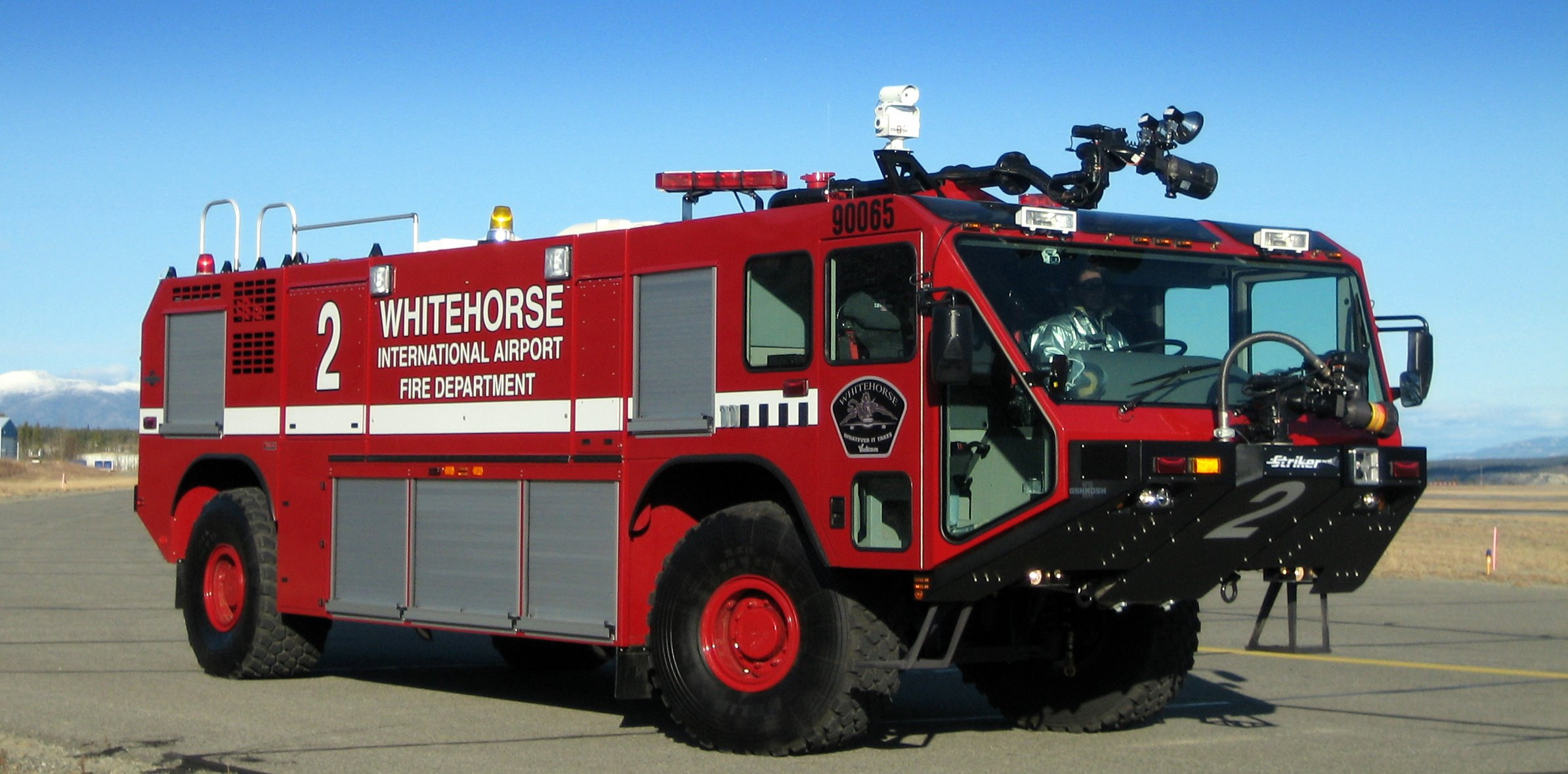
- Oshkosh Striker 4x4 at Whitehorse International Airport

Overview
- Manufacturer: Oshkosh Corporation
- Assembly: United States: Oshkosh, Wisconsin

Powertrain
- Engine: 16.0 L Scania DC16 V8 (diesel)
- Transmission: 7-speed automatic (4x4); 7-speed automatic (6x6); 6-speed automatic (8x8)

Dimensions
- Wheelbase: 219 in (5.6 m) (4x4); 267 in (6.8 m) (6x6); 267 in (6.8 m) (8x8)
- Length: 426 in (10.8 m) (4x4); 475 in (12.1 m) (6x6); 535 in (13.6 m) (8x8)
- Width: 118–122 in (3.0–3.1 m)
- Height: 120 in (3.0 m) (4x4); 140 in (3.6 m) (6x6); 136 in (3.5 m) (8x8)
- Curb weight: 62,000 lb (28,123 kg) (4x4); 87,000 lb (39,463 kg) (6x6); 124,000 lb (56,245 kg) (8x8)

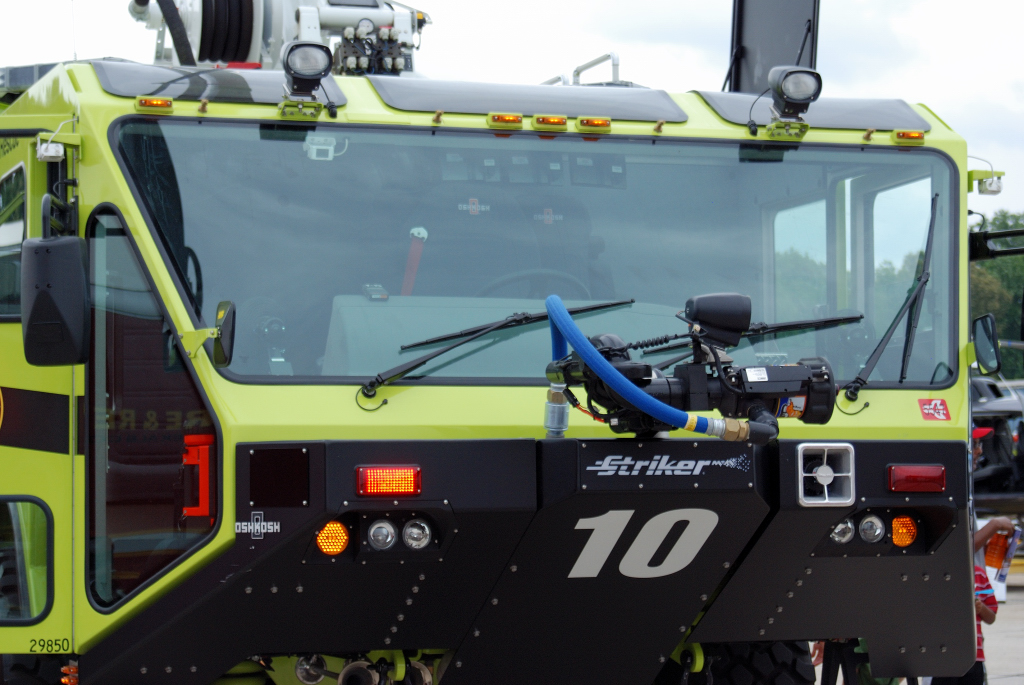
Oshkosh Striker at Hartsfield–Jackson Atlanta International Airport.

The Oshkosh Striker is a specialized aircraft rescue and firefighting (ARFF) vehicle built by Oshkosh Corporation at Pierce Manufacturing facilities in Appleton, Wisconsin. There are three models of the Striker: 4x4, 6x6, 8x8. All models are available with a snozzle capable of piercing an aircraft fuselage to dispense fire retardant material within a cabin or cargo area.

== Current Models ==
=== 4x4 ===
The Striker 4x4 is the 2-axle model. It features

- 1,500-US-gallon (5,700 L) water tank
- 210-US-gallon (790 L) foam tank
- 450 pounds (200 kg) of dry chemical
- 460 pounds (210 kg) of Halotron 1

Oshkosh unveiled a new modernized Striker at FDIC-Indianapolis, April 2010. It is 910 kilograms (2,000 lb) lighter, so it is faster and more maneuverable. The new Striker was designed with extensive feedback from firefighters and fire chiefs. It has a 520 kilowatts (700 hp) Deutz TCD 16.0L V8 Diesel engine with over 2,700 newton-metres (2,000 lb⋅ft) of torque. This new edition has 8 square metres (84 ft^{2}) of glass in the front windscreen, and for the first time has crosslays. Engine maintenance is facilitated by a walk-in, step-up platform incorporated into the rear of the unit, making major systems easily serviced.

=== 6x6 ===
The Striker 6x6 is the 3-axle model. It features:

- 3,000-US-gallon (11,000 L) water tank
- 420-US-gallon (1,600 L) foam tank
- 500 pounds (230 kg) of dry chemical
- 460 pounds (210 kg) of Halotron 1

=== 8x8 ===
The Striker 8x8 is the 4-axle model. It features:

- 4,500-US-gallon (17,000 L) water tank
- 630-US-gallon (2,400 L) foam tank
- 500 pounds (230 kg) of dry chemical
- 460 pounds (210 kg) of Halotron 1
