= McNeilus =

American truck manufacturer

McNeilus Truck and Manufacturing
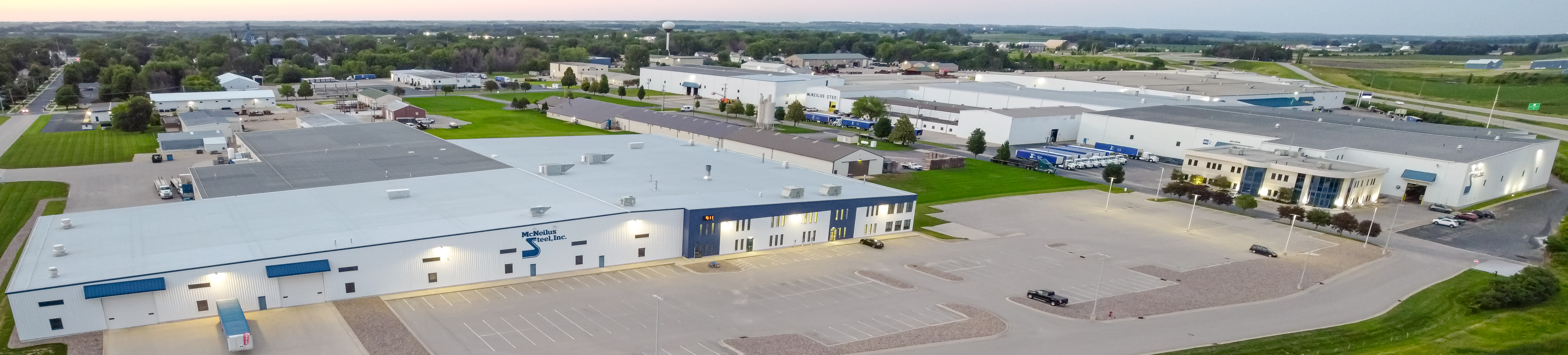
- McNeilus Steel in Dodge Center
- Industry: Automotive
- Founded: 1970
- Founder: Garwin Mcnelius; Dennis McNeilus
- Headquarters: Dodge Center, Minnesota, United States
- Key people: Brad Nelson (President and CEO)
- Products: Refuse vehicles
- Parent: Oshkosh
- Website: mcneilusgarbagetrucks.com

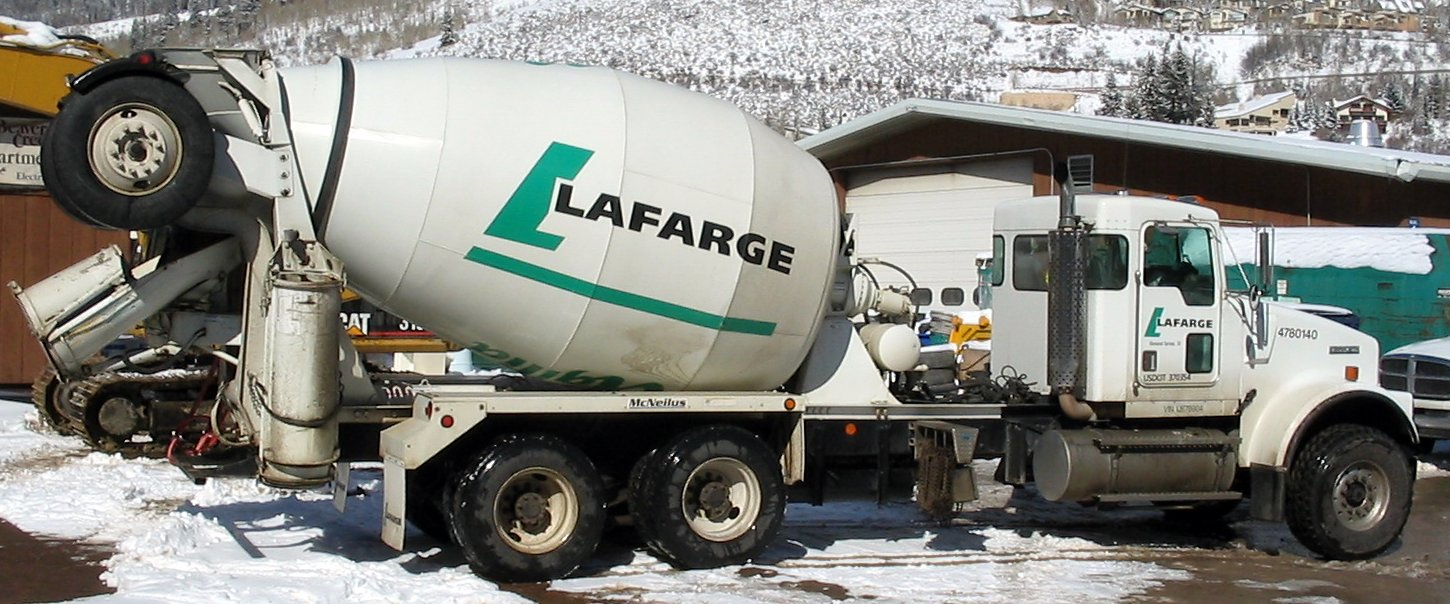
Concrete transport truck

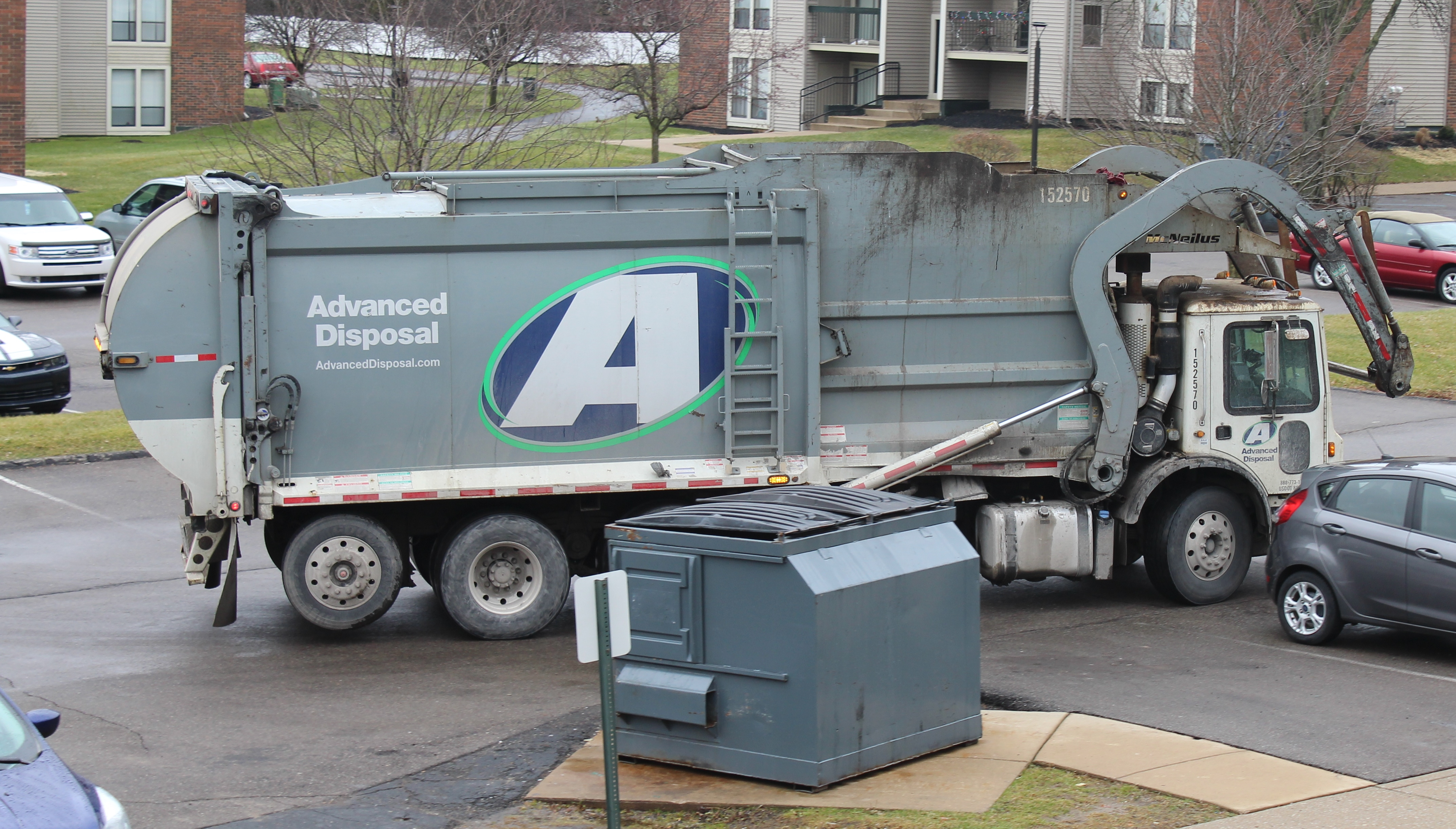
Mcneilus front loader refuse collection truck

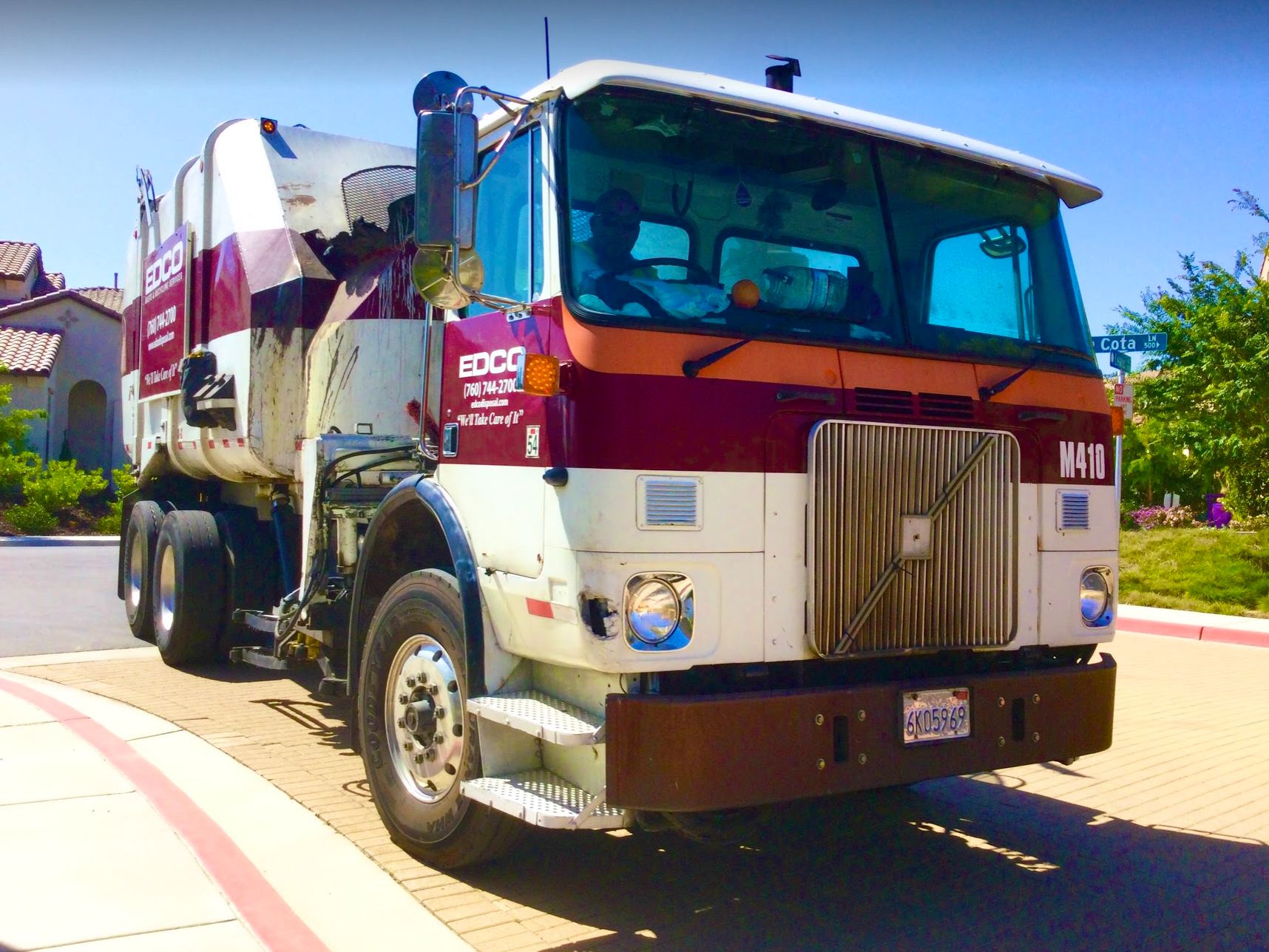
An EDCO automated side loader in Vista, California

McNeilus Truck and Manufacturing manufactures refuse collection vehicles in Dodge Center, Minnesota, United States, where it is the largest employer.

The firm was created by Garwin and his brother Dennis McNeilus on July 21, 1970, and later sold to Oshkosh Corporation (NYSE: OSK), in 1997. In addition to manufacturing and new vehicle sales and leasing, McNeilus also sells parts and used vehicles, and provides parts and service for past products.

== Products ==
Garbage Trucks

- Front Loaders
  - Atlantic
  - Meridian
  - Volterra ZFL
- Side Loaders
  - Zero Radius
  - AutoReach
  - Manual/ Automated
  - Volterra ZSL
- Rear Loaders
  - Standard
  - Heavy Duty
  - Extra Compaction
  - Tag Axle
  - Split Body
  - M2
