= Manitowoc Cranes =

Division of The Manitowoc Company, Inc.

- Company type: Public
- Traded as: NYSE: MTW
- Industry: Manufacturing
- Headquarters: 11270 West Park Place; Milwaukee, Wisconsin; United States
- Number of locations: Five regional headquarters, 8 manufacturing sites
- Area served: North America
- Key people: Aaron H. Ravenscroft (CEO)
- Products: Mobile hydraulic cranes, Lattice-boom crawler cranes, Truck-mounted cranes, Tower cranes
- Number of employees: 5,000
- Parent: Manitowoc Company
- Website: www.manitowoc.com

Manitowoc Cranes is a division of The Manitowoc Company, Inc. Manitowoc Cranes produces five brands of cranes: Grove, National Crane, Shuttlelift, Manitowoc, and Potain. In addition, Manitowoc has two distribution businesses based in the U.S.: Aspen Equipment and MGX Equipment Services (formerly H&E Equipment Services' crane business).

== History ==
Manitowoc Cranes began as a business venture by Charles West and Elias Gunnell. At the time, they headed the Manitowoc Dry Dock Company, now The Manitowoc Company, Inc. After World War I, The Manitowoc Shipbuilding Company was looking to diversify their business.

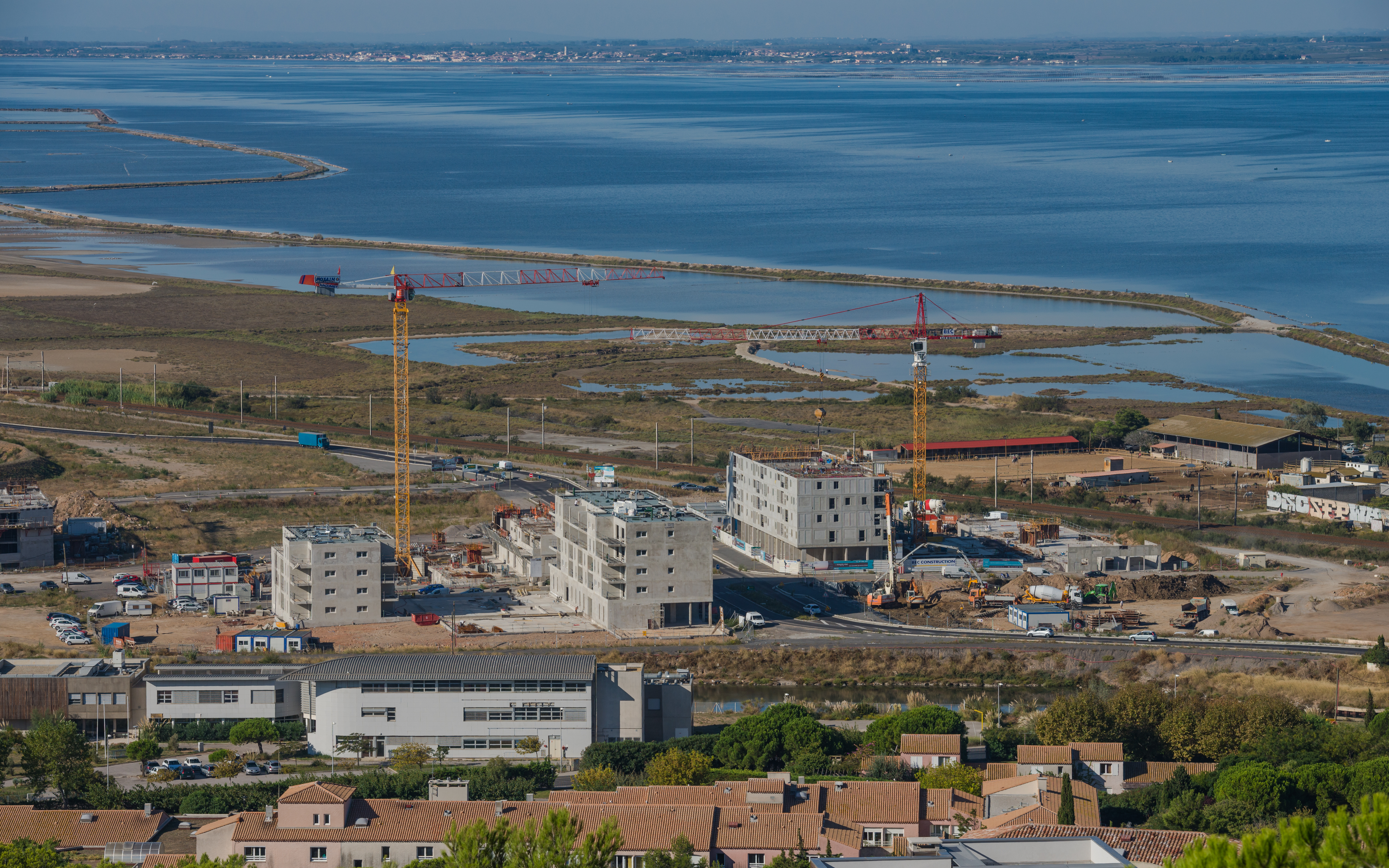
On the left a Potain MDT 178 from Manitowoc Cranes.

After observing the Moore Speedcrane, manufactured in Fort Wayne, Indiana, Charles West thought cranes were a way to expand the business and use his shipyard's machine shops. In 1925, The Moore Speedcrane Company was in debt, and Charles West was willing to help them build cranes to help provide cash for the struggling company. All patents were signed over to Manitowoc as a liability; however, they would not sell any machines under the Manitowoc name.

The Speedcrane in 1925 was a steam-driven, 15-ton capacity crane that sat on four wheels. Ten models were built by Manitowoc from this basic model. Eventually, after listening to customer feedback, Moore redesigned the crane and installed a gasoline engine. Another major change was the replacement of the wheels with a crawler base that allowed for better traction. The first model from the redesigned Speedcrane was a Model 100.

The Moore Speedcrane Company continued to introduce new models with innovative features; however, this put them deeper into debt. In 1928, when it was apparent that Moore was not going to be able to pay back the debts owed to Manitowoc, they began to manufacture and sell Speedcranes with its own sales force.

The Manitowoc Crane and Manitowoc Food Service Groups separated into two stand alone companies in March 2016. Manitowoc Cranes Stock Symbol MTW and Manitowoc Food Service stock Symbol MFS.

=== Formation ===
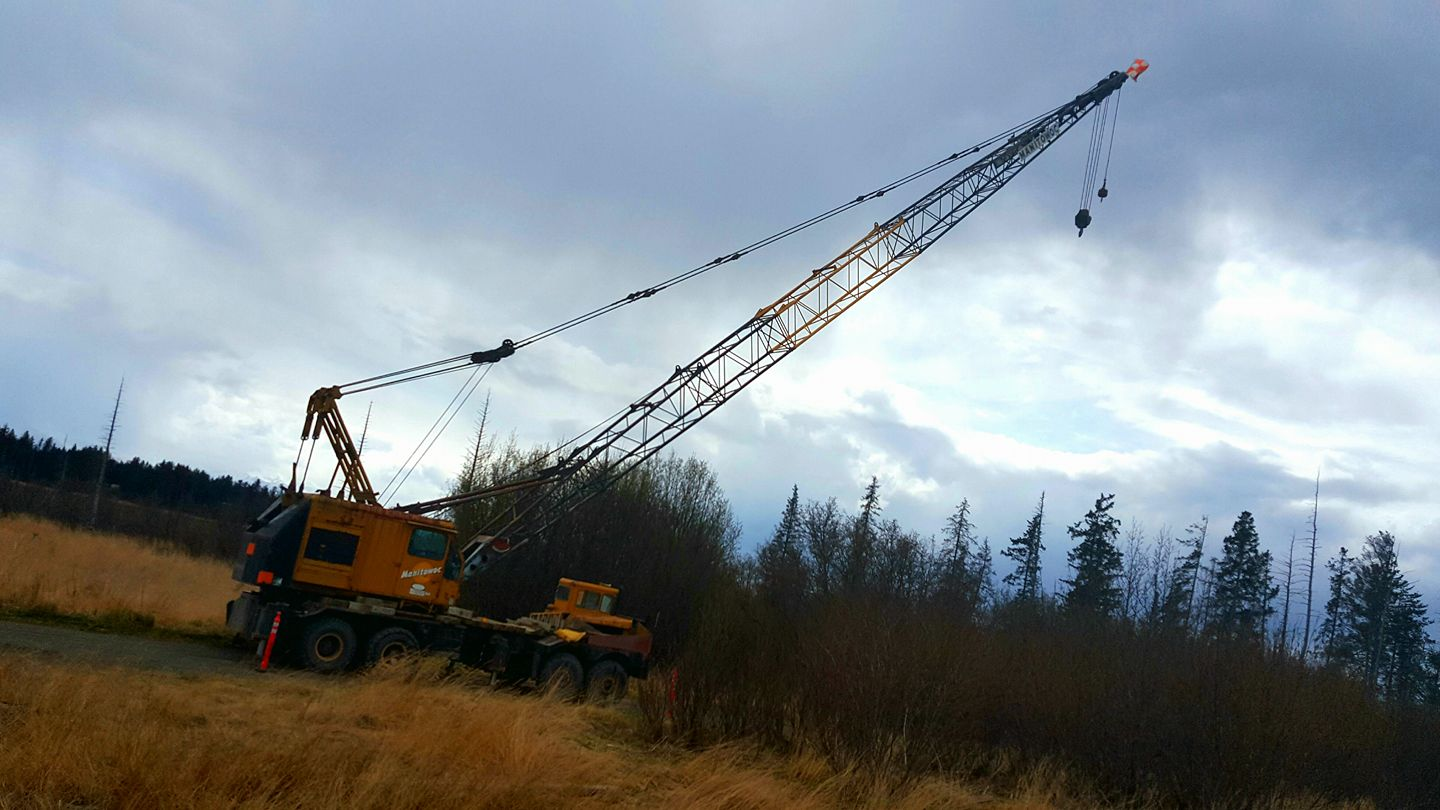

In 1994, Manitowoc acquired Femco Machine Company, a manufacturer of crane parts. Femco and Manitowoc Re-manufacturing were consolidated to form the Aftermarket Group. In March 2003, Manitowoc sold Femco Machine Company to a group of private investors

Manitex, a boom truck line, was formed by Manitowoc in 1983. Manitowoc acquired two more boom truck companies - USTC in 1998 and Pioneer in 2000. These three brands were combined to form Manitowoc Boom Truck. In 2003, Manitowoc sold off the Manitowoc Boom Truck brand to Quantum Heavy Equipment, LLC.

West-Manitowoc was formed as a separate division of the Manitowoc Corporation in 1994 as the brainchild of Fred Butler, the President of the corporation at that time. The primary purpose of this division was to re-enter the manufacture and marketing of smaller lattice boom crawler cranes, (130 tons and under capacity); a size class that had been dropped from Manitowoc Cranes product line a few years earlier. In its relatively short existence, the West division achieved a leading market position in the U.S. for the 100 ton class of crawler cranes, and became the corporation's leading "Economic Value Added (EVA)" contributor. After re-establishing a market position for the company in the smaller class of crawler cranes, the West-Manitowoc division was merged with Manitowoc Cranes in 1998.

Manitowoc acquired the Potain brand in 2001, followed by Grove and National Crane in 2002. The announcement to acquire Grove Worldwide was made in March 2002 at CONEXPO in Las Vegas, Nevada. Manitowoc purchased Grove for $271 million.

In 2007, Manitowoc announced their acquisition of Shirke, an India-based Potain manufacturer and distributor since 1982.

== Brands ==
=== Grove ===
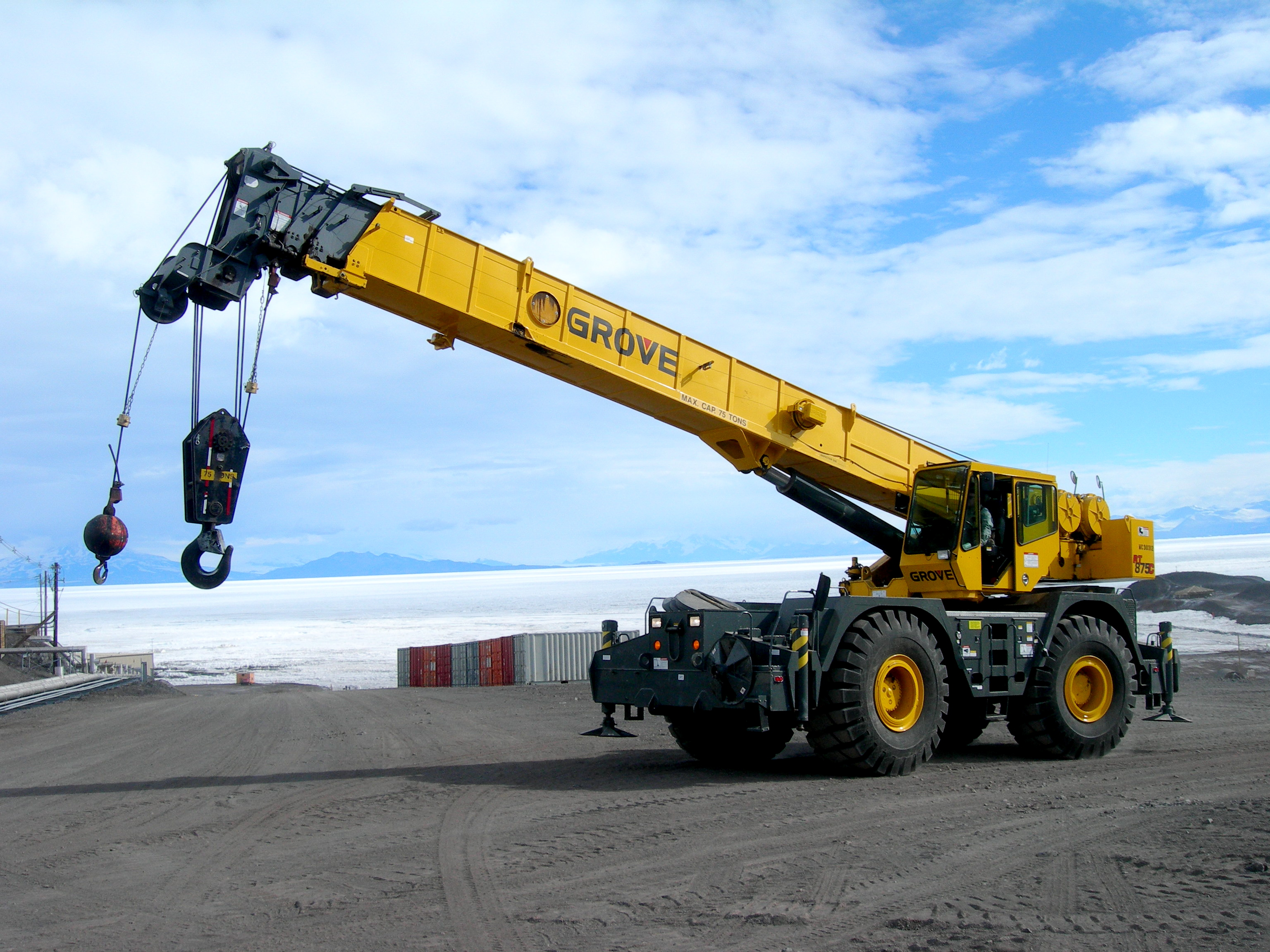
A Grove rough terrain Crane.

Manitowoc's Grove mobile hydraulic product line includes rough-terrain, truck-mounted, all-terrain, Grove YardBoss, industrial cranes and Shuttlelift Carrydeck cranes. Grove is also a major supplier of custom-built machines to armed forces around the world. The Grove brand includes over 40 models with lifting capacities ranging from 8.5 USt to 550 USt.

In 1947, Grove Manufacturing Company was founded by brothers Dwight L. Grove and John L. Grove and friend Wayne A. Nicarry to produce rubber-tire farm wagons. The company began in a small, rented two-car garage in Shady Grove, Pennsylvania. Grove started out small by building yard-type cranes for its own use and later expanded to produce cranes commercially. As a manufacturer, it has achieved a number of "firsts" in the course of its history, including introducing the world's first slewing rough terrain crane in 1968 and the world's first trapezoidal boom in 1970; and by becoming the first international multi-facility crane manufacturer to receive the ISO 9001 quality assurance certification in 1994.

=== Manitowoc Lattice-Boom Crawler Cranes ===
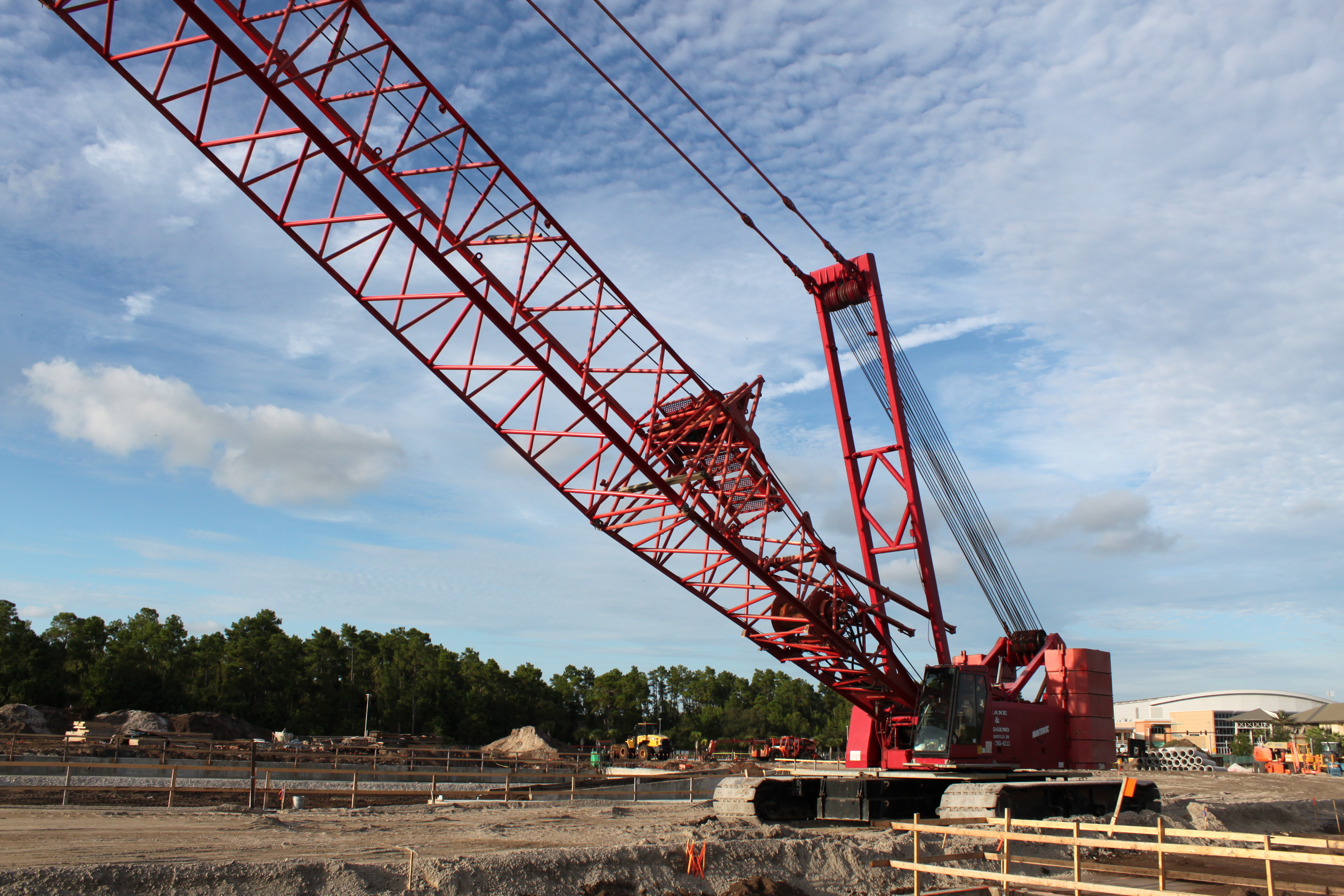
A Manitowoc Model 999 lattice-boom crawler crane.

The Manitowoc lattice boom crawler crane product line has 16 products and two capacity-enhancing attachments. Manitowoc lattice-boom crawler cranes was the beginning of Manitowoc Cranes until the major acquisitions in 2001. In 1969, Manitowoc introduced its flagship crane, the Model 4100W. Manitowoc introduced its first self-erecting, all-hydraulic crane, the Model M-250, in 1992.

=== National Crane Boom Trucks ===
Manitowoc also manufactures National Crane Boom Trucks, a line of telescoping boom truck cranes. National Crane was founded in Nebraska by Marlo Burg in 1947, and began by manufacturing roadside weed sprayers. In 1952, National also introduced a line of front-end loaders. Operations were moved to Waverly, Nebraska in 1962, and the name National Crane Corporation was adopted. After ownership passed through a number of companies, Manitowoc acquired National Cranes in 2002, and all production moved to the Grove U.S. LLC, Shady Grove, Pennsylvania facility in 2003.

=== Self-erecting and top-slewing cranes ===
Potain is the Manitowoc brand of tower cranes. They produce both top-slewing and self-erecting models. Potain was a French-based company founded in La Clayette, France, in 1928 by Faustin Potain. The first crane was assembled in 1933.

=== Distribution and Service ===
==== Aspen Equipment and MGX Equipment Services ====
In 2021, In 2021, Manitowoc completed the acquisition of substantially all of the assets of Aspen Equipment Company, a diversified crane dealer and a leading final stage purpose-built work truck upfitter, and substantially all of the assets and liabilities of the crane business of H&E Equipment Services, Inc. (“H&E”), one of the largest rental equipment companies in the U.S.

==== Manitowoc Crane Care ====
Manitowoc Crane Care is the customer service branch of Manitowoc Cranes. Formed in 2000, Crane Care provides customers with parts, service and technical support, technical publications, training, and EnCORE. The EnCORE program rebuilds and repairs run-down or damaged cranes. Manitowoc Crane Care operates in 15 countries at 22 locations.

==== Manitowoc Finance ====
Manitowoc Finance provides financing options through different programs to crane customers.

== Areas of business ==
=== The Americas ===
Includes North and South America. Regional headquarters is in Shady Grove, Pennsylvania and Corporate headquarters is Milwaukee, Wisconsin.

=== Europe and Africa ===
Represents all countries in Europe and Africa regions. Regional offices are in Dardilly, France and Langenfeld, Germany.

=== Middle East and Asia-Pacific ===
Represents all countries in the Middle East Greater Asia-Pacific regions. Regional headquarters are in Singapore and Shanghai, China.

== Manufacturing facilities ==
Manitowoc cranes are produced at eight factories in seven countries.

=== China ===
Zhangjiagang: Manufactured its first crane in Nov. 2005. Products Potain cranes ranging from 5 USt to 25 USt capacity and Grove and Manitowoc crawler components Manitowoc Crane Care also operates a tower crane training center at this facility.
Tai'an: In 2008, Manitowoc began a joint venture with TaiAn Dongyue Heavy Machinery Company, which was founded in 1972. This facility manufactures Manitowoc Dongyue truck cranes In 2013, Manitowoc announced that its divestiture of the joint venture.

=== France ===
Charlieu: Potain self-erecting cranes and mechanisms for all cranes
La Clayette: factory closed 2010; training centre closed 2013
Moulins: Potain tower cranes

=== Germany ===
Wilhelmshaven: Grove all-terrains, Grove GTK 1100, Manitowoc 15000 Wilhelmshaven underwent an expansion in 2008.

=== India ===
Pune: Acquired with the addition of Shirke in 2007. Pune was the headquarters of Shirke. Pune manufactures Potain tower cranes (under license). TIL Limited, a company headquartered in Kolkata, also markets Manitowoc cranes like Grove. Coles Which is a part of Manitowoc owns around 19% equity in TIL Limited.

=== Italy ===
Niella Tanaro: Began manufacturing self-erecting cranes in 2000. In 2005, it began to manufacture top-slewing cranes. Niella also underwent an expansion in 2007.

=== Portugal ===
Fânzeres: Completes painting, assembly, testing and shipping of Potain tower cranes. Closed in 2017 and consolidated into Baltar.
Baltar: Opened in 2007. This facility works with the site in Fânzeres. Baltar does the majority of cutting and welding.

=== United States ===
Port Washington, Wisconsin: In 2006, Manitowoc acquired this factory with the addition of Exactech. In 2007, Port Washington underwent a $7.4 million expansion. Lower works for Manitowoc crawler model 16000 are manufactured here.
Shady Grove, Pennsylvania: Grove all-terrain, rough-terrain, truck cranes and industrial cranes; National Crane boom trucks; Shuttlelift Carrydeck cranes; Manitowoc crawler cranes.

== Financial information ==
Year (2020)	Net sales (in millions): $1.4 billion	Adjusted EBITDA (in millions): $83.1 million	Operating income / (loss) (in millions): $38.6 million	Products/Services
1996	220.8	22.6	Manitowoc, Manitex, Femco, West-Manitowoc	
1997	259.6	34.9	Manitowoc, Manitex, Femco, West-Manitowoc	
1998	339.1	48.1	Manitowoc, UTSC, Femco	
1999	389.5	64.8	Manitowoc, Manitex, Spyder, Pioneer, TailGator, Femco	
2000	376.3	62.9	Manitowoc, CraneCare, Femco	
2001	453.2	62.7	Manitowoc, Potain, CraneCare, Femco	
2002	681.0	55.2	Manitowoc, Potain, Grove, National, Manlift, CraneCare, Crane Credit	
2003	963.0	25.1	Manitowoc, Potain, Grove, National, Manlift, CraneCARE, CraneCREDIT	
2004	1,248.0	57.0	Manitowoc, Potain, Grove, National, Crane CARE,	
2005	1,628.0	115.5	Manitowoc Cranes, Potain, Grove, National, CraneCARE, CraneCREDIT	
2006	2,235.0	280.6	Manitowoc, Potain, Grove, National, Manitowoc CraneCARE, CraneCREDIT	
2007	3,246.0	470.5	Manitowoc, Potain, Grove, National, Shuttlelift, YardBoss, Manitowoc Crane Care,	
