= Oshkosh Corporation =

American industrial company

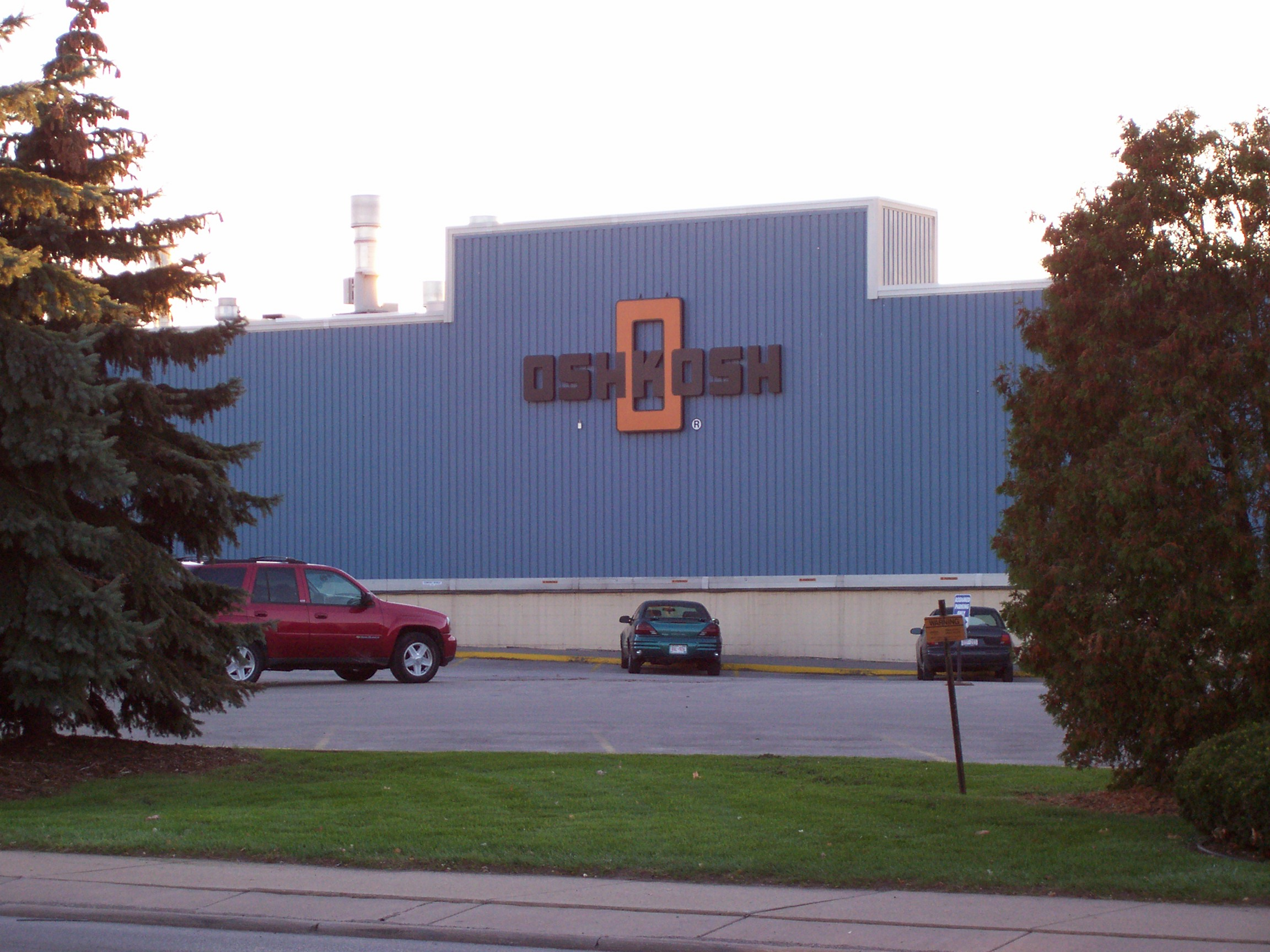
- Oshkosh North Plant
- Type: Public
- Traded as: NYSE: OSK; S&P 400 Component
- Industry: Automotive, Arms industry
- Founded: 1917; 109 years ago (as Wisconsin Duplex Auto Company)
- Founders: William Besserdich; Bernhard Mosling
- Headquarters: Oshkosh, Wisconsin, U.S.
- Number of locations: 29 (manufacturing facilities)
- Area served: Worldwide
- Key people: Stephen Newlin; (Chairman of the Board); John Pfeifer; (President & CEO); Michael Pack; (Executive VP & CFO)
- Products: Specialty trucks; Access equipment; Military vehicles
- Revenue: ▲US$ 7.95 billion; (FY Dec. 31 2021)
- Operating income: ▲US$ 466.8 million; (FY Dec. 31 2021)
- Net income: ▲US$ 409.4 million; (FY Dec. 31 2021)
- Total assets: ▲US$ 6.72 billion; (FY Dec. 31 2021)
- Total equity: ▲US$ 3.08 billion; (FY Dec. 31 2021)
- Number of employees: 15000 (2022)
- Subsidiaries: Oshkosh, Oshkosh AeroTech, Oshkosh Airport Products, Oshkosh Defense, Frontline Communications, Hinowa, IMT, Jerr-Dan, JLG Industries, London Machinery Inc., Maxi Métal, McNeilus, Pierce Manufacturing, Pratt Miller
- Website: www.oshkoshcorp.com

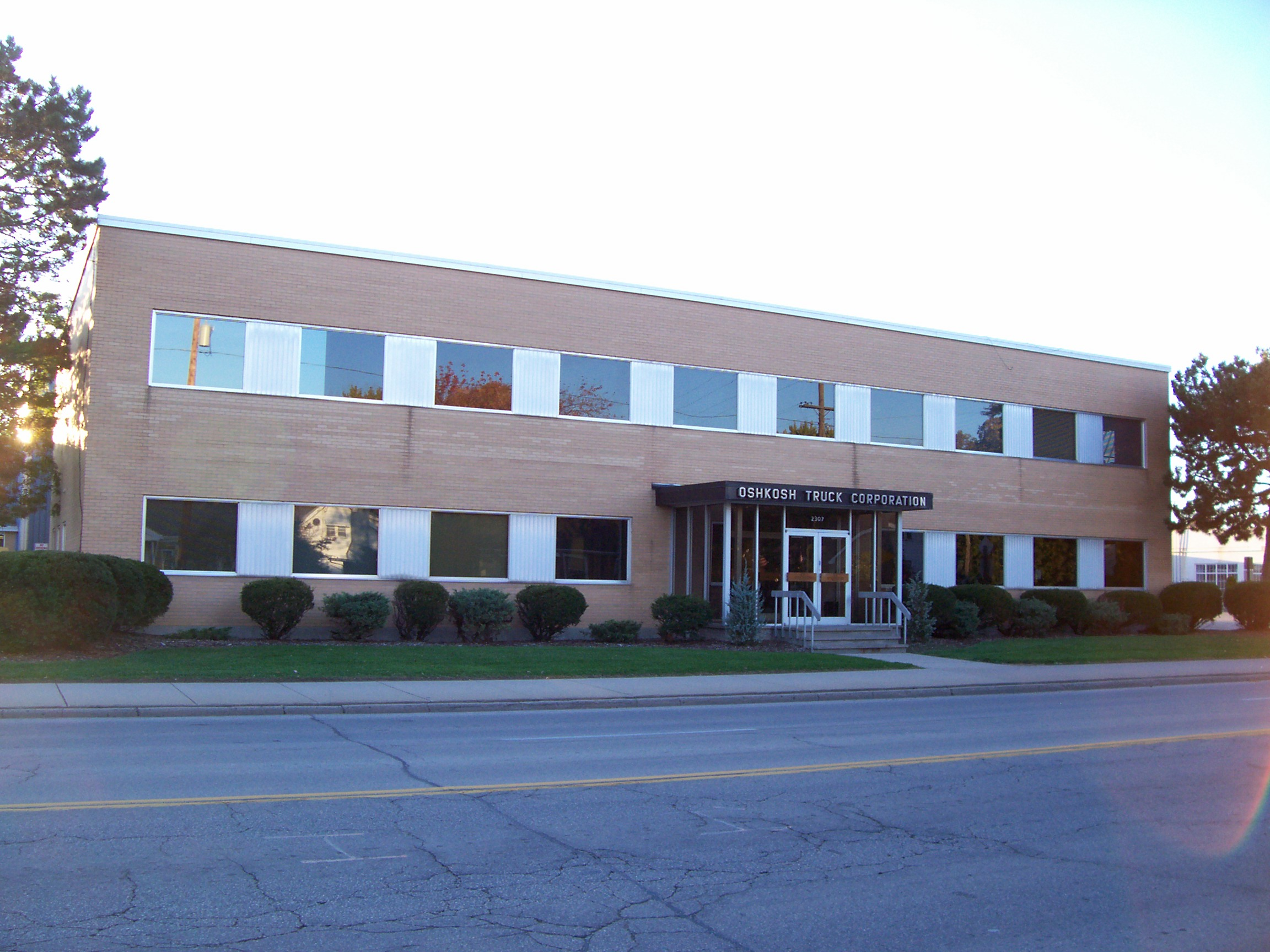
Oshkosh facility in Oshkosh, Wisconsin, U.S.

Oshkosh Corporation, formerly Oshkosh Truck, is an American industrial company that designs and builds specialty trucks, military vehicles, truck bodies, airport fire apparatus, and access equipment. The corporation also owns Pierce Manufacturing, a fire apparatus manufacturer in Appleton, Wisconsin, and JLG Industries, a manufacturer of lift equipment, including aerial lifts, boom lifts, scissor lifts, telehandlers and low-level access lifts.

Based in Oshkosh, Wisconsin, the company employs approximately 15000 people around the world at 130 facilities in 24 countries. It is organized in four primary business groups: access equipment, defense, fire and emergency, and commercial.

== History ==
Founded in 1917, as the Wisconsin Duplex Auto Company, the company was created to build a severe-duty four-wheel-drive truck. After the first prototype was built, the company began to develop rapidly. This first four-wheel-drive truck, known today as "Old Betsy", is still owned by Oshkosh Corporation and housed in the new Global Headquarters building in Oshkosh. The vehicle still runs and is used frequently in demonstrations and parades. The first mass-produced truck was the 2-ton Model A, with seven produced in 1918. The 3.5-ton Model B and 5-ton Model F followed. The Model TR, introduced in 1933, was a diversification for the company and was the first rubber tired earthmover ever built.

The model 50-50, introduced in 1955, was the first truck created specifically for the hauling of concrete. The first aircraft rescue and firefighting (ARFF) W2206 With rollover snow plows or snow blowers were delivered to all branches of US military for airfield snow removal. Oshkosh has also produced aircraft tow tractors, and in 1968 the company designed and built the U-30 tow tractor, 45 of which were built for the U.S. Air Force to tow the Lockheed C-5 Galaxy transport aircraft.

In 1976, the company won a U.S. Army contract to supply 744 M911 heavy equipment transporters, the first in a long line of U.S. Army contracts that now sees Oshkosh Defense as the sole supplier of medium and heavy tactical trucks to the U.S. Army and Marines.

On August 25, 2015, Oshkosh was awarded the U.S. military's Joint Light Tactical Vehicle contract. The initial JLTV award is valued at $6.75 billion for up to 16,901 vehicles. The procurement objective for JLTV stands at 49,099 Army and 9,091 Marines, with the Navy and Air Force also having smaller requirements. The estimated program cost is $47.6 billion. JLTV will partially replace the AM General Humvee.

On November 7, 2017, the Oshkosh Common Council approved a proposal to sell part of the century-old Lake Shore Golf Course along the shore of Lake Butte des Morts to Oshkosh Corp. for its new headquarters. On November 22, 2017, the Oshkosh Corporation announced it would build the new headquarters on the golf course. The city plans to redevelop the rest of the golf course into a new public space.

On February 7, 2018, the U.S. Army announced that the Family of Medium Tactical Vehicles A2 (FMTV A2) contract had been awarded to Oshkosh Defense. Oshkosh was already building the FMTV A1P2, having been awarded this contract in August 2009. As of August 2021, Oshkosh has built around 40000 FMTVs for the US military and others.

In February 2020, Oshkosh Corporation was named one of the 2020 World's Most Ethical Companies by Ethisphere, a for-profit organization.

In February 2021, Oshkosh Defense was awarded the U.S. Postal Service's Next Generation Delivery Vehicle (NGDV) mail truck contract for between 50000 and 165000 units over ten years, with production start targeted for 2023. The fleet will include low-emissions internal combustion engine vehicles as well as battery electric vehicles (BEVs) and could be worth over $6 billion.

== Locations ==
Oshkosh Corporation is headquartered in Oshkosh, Wisconsin. It has manufacturing operations in eight U.S. states and in Australia, Canada, China, France and Romania, and through investments in joint ventures in Mexico and Brazil. The access equipment division is headquartered in McConnellsburg, Pennsylvania; the Defense division in Oshkosh, Wisconsin; the Fire & Emergency division in Appleton, Wisconsin; and the Commercial division in Dodge Center, Minnesota.

Oshkosh products and services are sold in more than 150 countries around the globe. The company also maintains a global service network.

== Subsidiaries ==
Oshkosh Corporation manufactures, distributes, and services products under fourteen brands: Oshkosh, Oshkosh AeroTech, Oshkosh Airport Products, Oshkosh Defense LLC, Frontline Communications, Hinowa, IMT (Iowa Mold Tooling Co., Inc.), JerrDan LLC, JLG Industries Inc., London Machinery Inc., Maxi Métal, McNeilus, Pierce Manufacturing Inc., and Pratt Miller.

== Products ==
=== Defense ===
The current and recent main defense products of Oshkosh Defense include the following:

- Family of Medium Tactical Vehicles (FMTV). The FMTV is the U.S. Army's standard 2.5- and 5-ton truck. The FMTV was originally manufactured by Stewart and Stevenson (1996–2006), then by Armor Holdings (2006–2007), then by what is now BAE Systems Platforms & Services. From 2011 it has been manufactured by Oshkosh.
- HET; Global HET, M1070/M1070A1/M1300. The M1070, in A0, A1 and M1300 configurations, is the U.S. Army's current tank transporter tractor. The Global HET is essentially a M1070A1 with three axles instead of four.
- Heavy Expanded Mobility Tactical Truck - M977 HEMTT. The HEMTT is the U.S. Army's standard 10-ton truck. In evolving configurations it has been in continuous production since 1982; current variants suffixed A4.
- Heavy Expanded Mobility Tactical Truck HEMTT A3 diesel-electric. The HEMTT A3 was a prototype/developmental design with a diesel-electric drive system.
- Oshkosh L-ATV / Joint Light Tactical Vehicle. The Oshkosh L-ATV won the Department of Defense's JLTV (Joint Light Tactical Vehicle) competition. JLTV will replace the military's aging AM General HMMWV/Humvee fleet. The first JLTV order was placed in March 2016. For certain applications Oshkosh retains the L-ATV name/brand.
- LVS (Logistics Vehicle System). A U.S. Marine Corps 8x8 truck that has been replaced by the LVSR
- Logistics Vehicle System Replacement (LVSR). The LVSR is a family of vehicles, based on a common 5-axle ten-wheel drive 10x10 chassis, that vary in individual configuration by mission requirements. It replaced the LVS.
- M-ATV (MRAP All-Terrain Vehicle). A medium-weight mine blast protected vehicle originally developed for use in Afghanistan.
- MTVR (Medium Tactical Vehicle Replacement). The MTVR is the standard 7-ton truck of the U.S. Marines.
- Wheeled Tanker. A UK-specific MTVR development.
- Sand Cat. A light protected vehicle based on a Ford F550 chassis.
- P-19R. U.S. Marines' Aircraft Rescue Fire Fighting (ARFF) truck.
- Special Purpose All-Terrain Vehicle (S-ATV). A developmental light all-terrain buggy-type design
- Palletized Load System (PLS); M1074/M1075 trucks and M1076 trailer. Five-axle all-wheel drive trucks and companion three-axle trailers; trucks fitted with a hooklift-type load-handling system
- TAK-4/TAK-4i. An independent suspension system
- TerraMax. Autonomous vehicle technology.

=== Airport products ===
Oshkosh Airport Products produces the Oshkosh Striker, a specialized aircraft rescue and firefighting (ARFF) vehicle.

=== Fire, emergency, rescue, recovery, police, and homeland security ===
Products for these market segments are produced under the Pierce, Oshkosh, Oshkosh AeroTech, Frontline, Jerr-Dan, and brands, and Maxi Métal Inc brands. Through Pierce Manufacturing there is also an ownership interest in BME Fire Trucks. Products include pumpers, aerials, tankers, and wildland fire appliances, ambulances/medical vehicles, and police/homeland security vehicles.

=== Access equipment ===
Products include JLG and SkyTrak brand telehandlers, wheeled and tracked boom lifts, and other lifting equipment. In November 2022, Oshkosh announced it had entered into a definitive agreement to acquire Hinowa S.p.A., a privately held international company and manufacturer of track-based aerial work platforms, mini dumpers, lift trucks and undercarriages. Once complete, Hinowa will become part of the Oshkosh Access Equipment segment.

=== Commercial/civil ===
Oshkosh produces a variety of products under the Jerr-Dan (towing and recovery vehicles), Pratt & Miller (engineering and product development), Frontline Communications (media communications and similar), McNeilus (refuse/garbage and concrete mixers), IMT (field service vehicles and mounted cranes), and London (concrete mixers). AeroTech produces snow plows, aviation ground equipment, and airport gate equipment. Oshkosh also produces the U.S. Postal Service's Next Generation Delivery Vehicle (NGDV).

== Gallery ==
Oshkosh Defense products

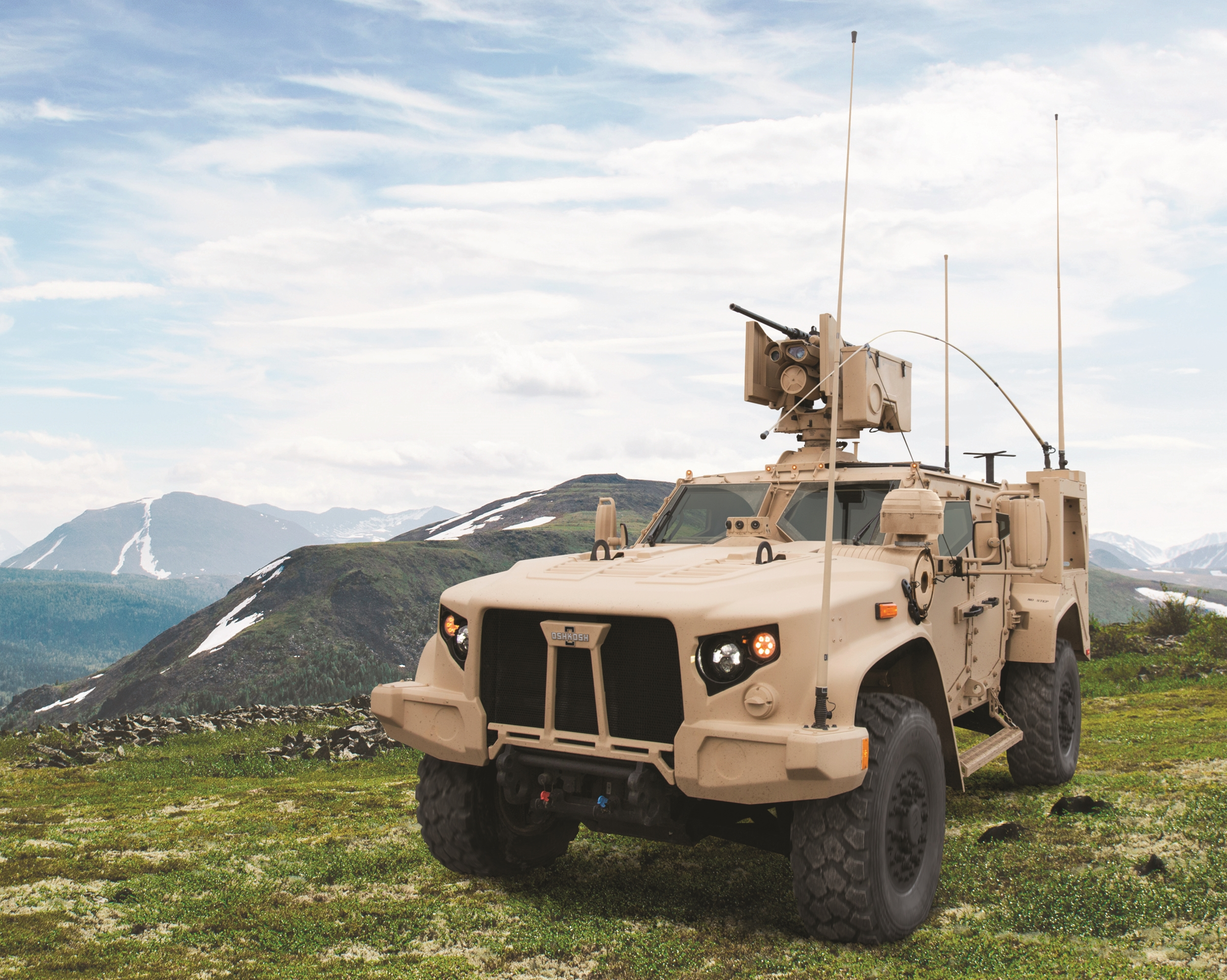
2016 Oshkosh L-ATV (configured as JLTV) equipped with M2 Browning heavy machine gun

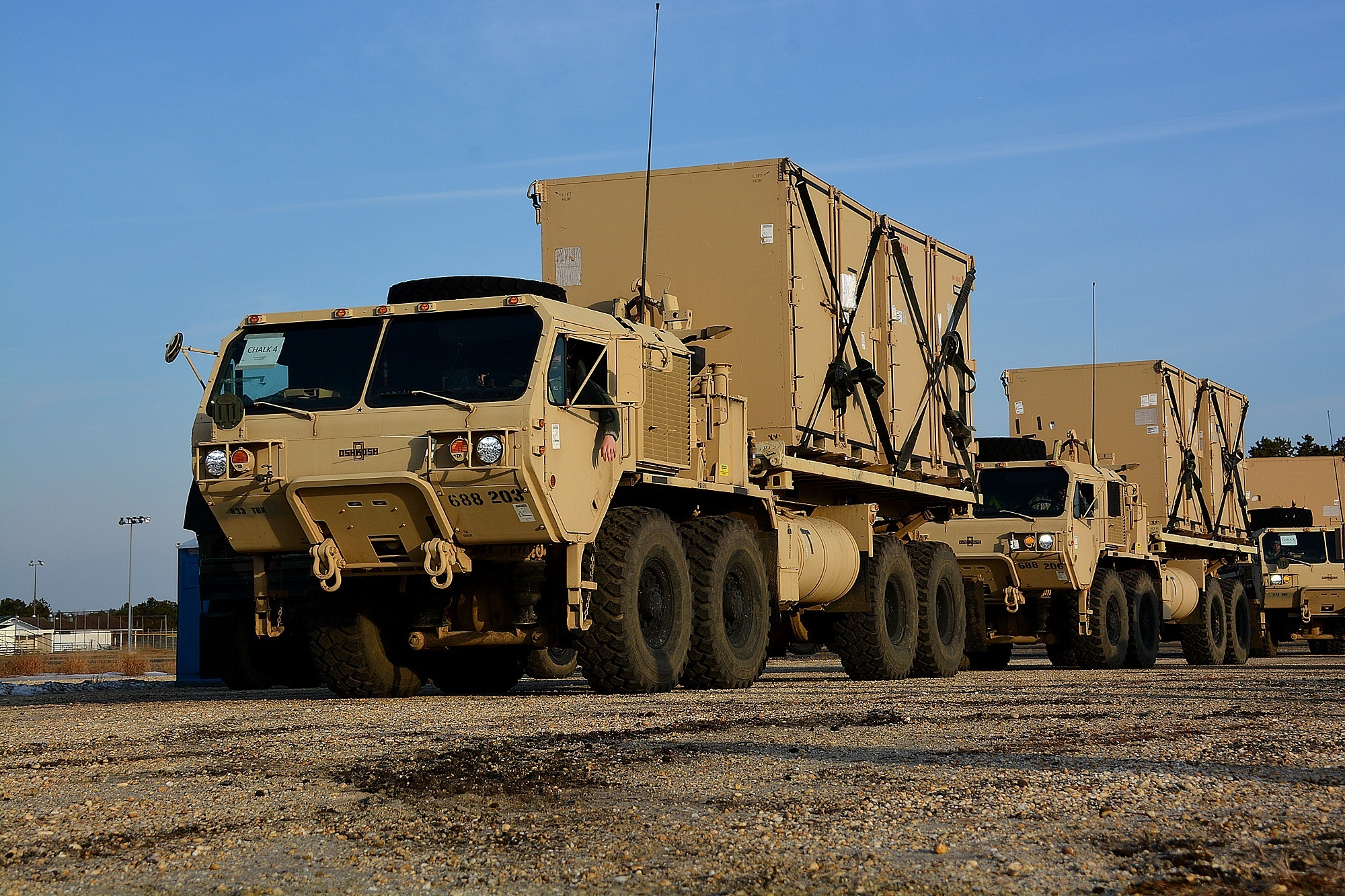
HEMTT M1120A4 in A-kit configuration - without cab armor, the B-kit

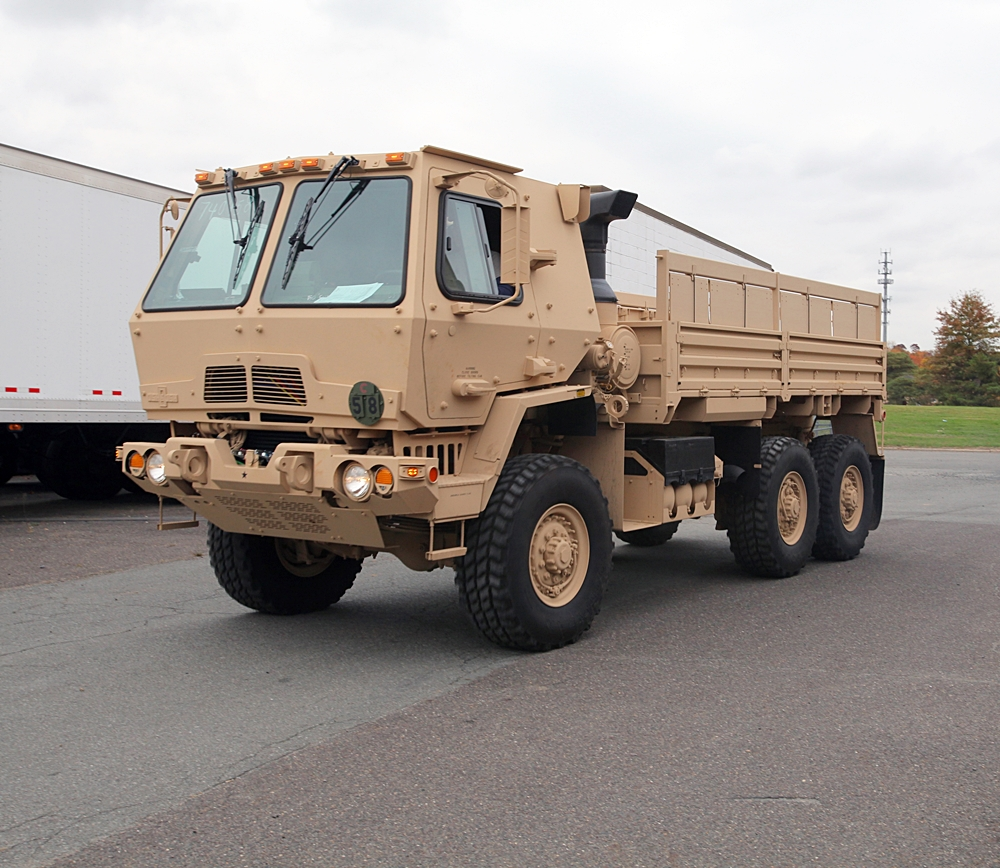
An Oshkosh-produced M1083 A1P2 5-ton MTV in A-kit configuration

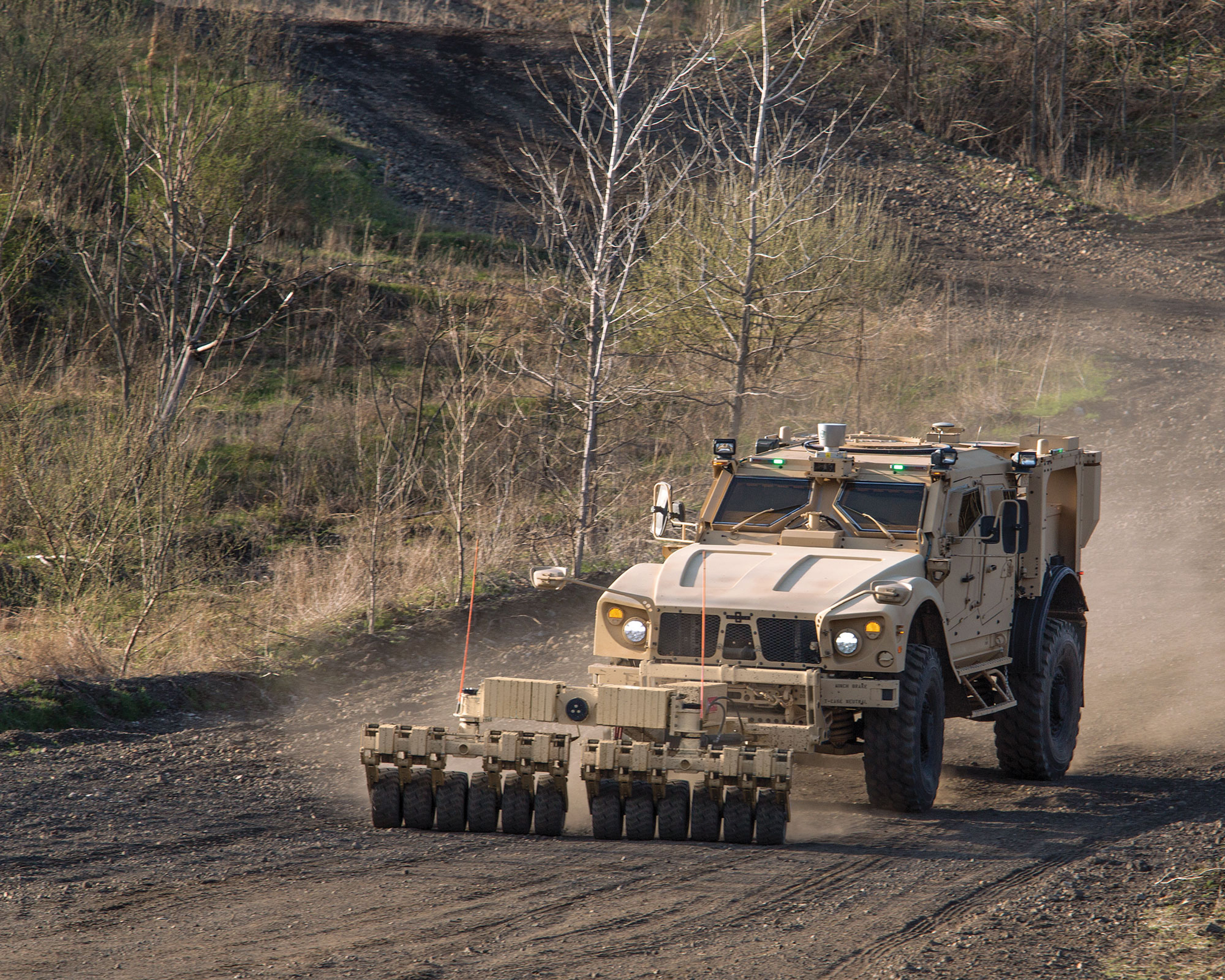
Oshkosh M-ATV with mine roller and TerraMax autonomous system

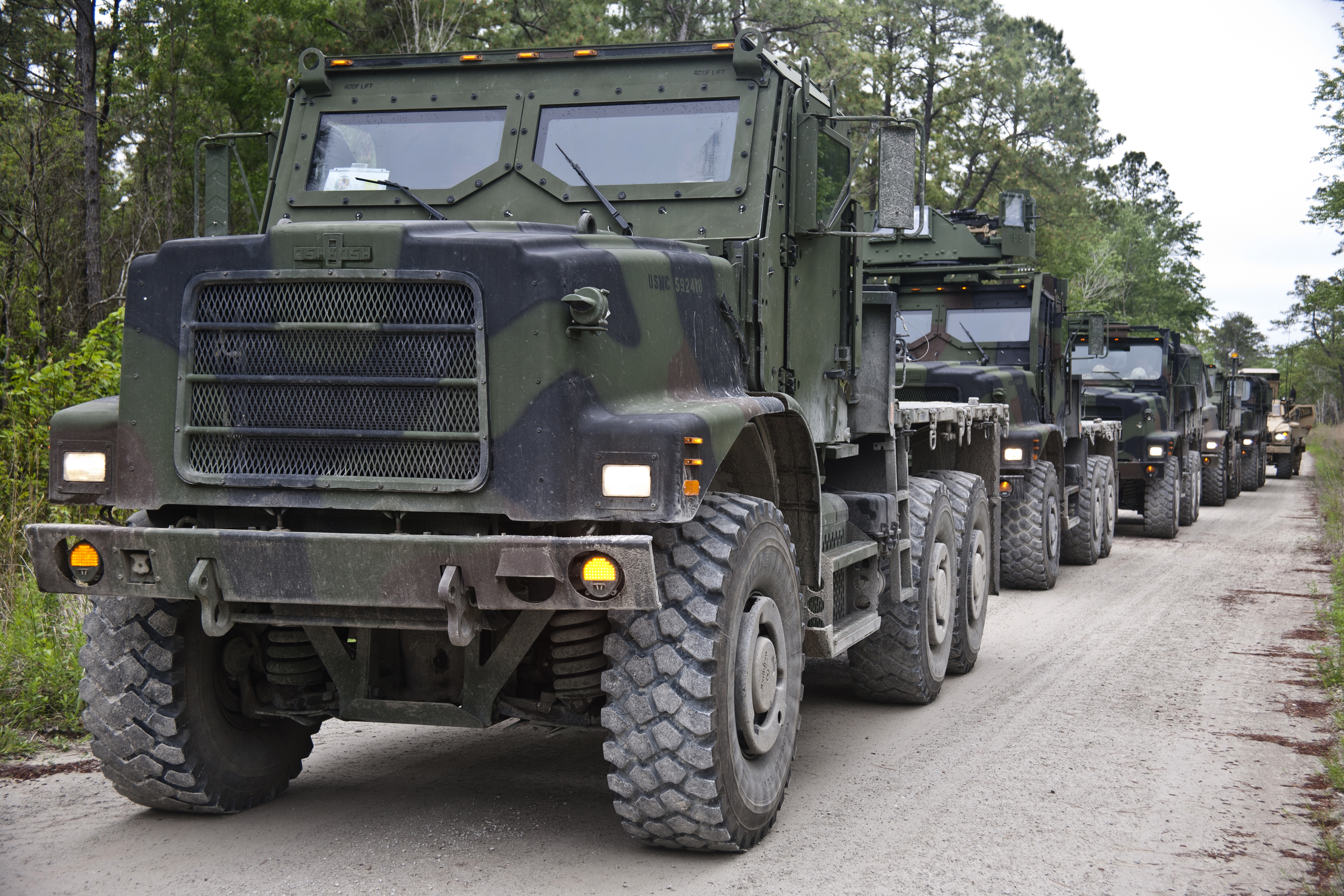
This Oshkosh MTVR MK23/MK25, on which the Oshkosh TAK-4 independent coil-spring suspension is clearly visible, is fitted with an armored cab.

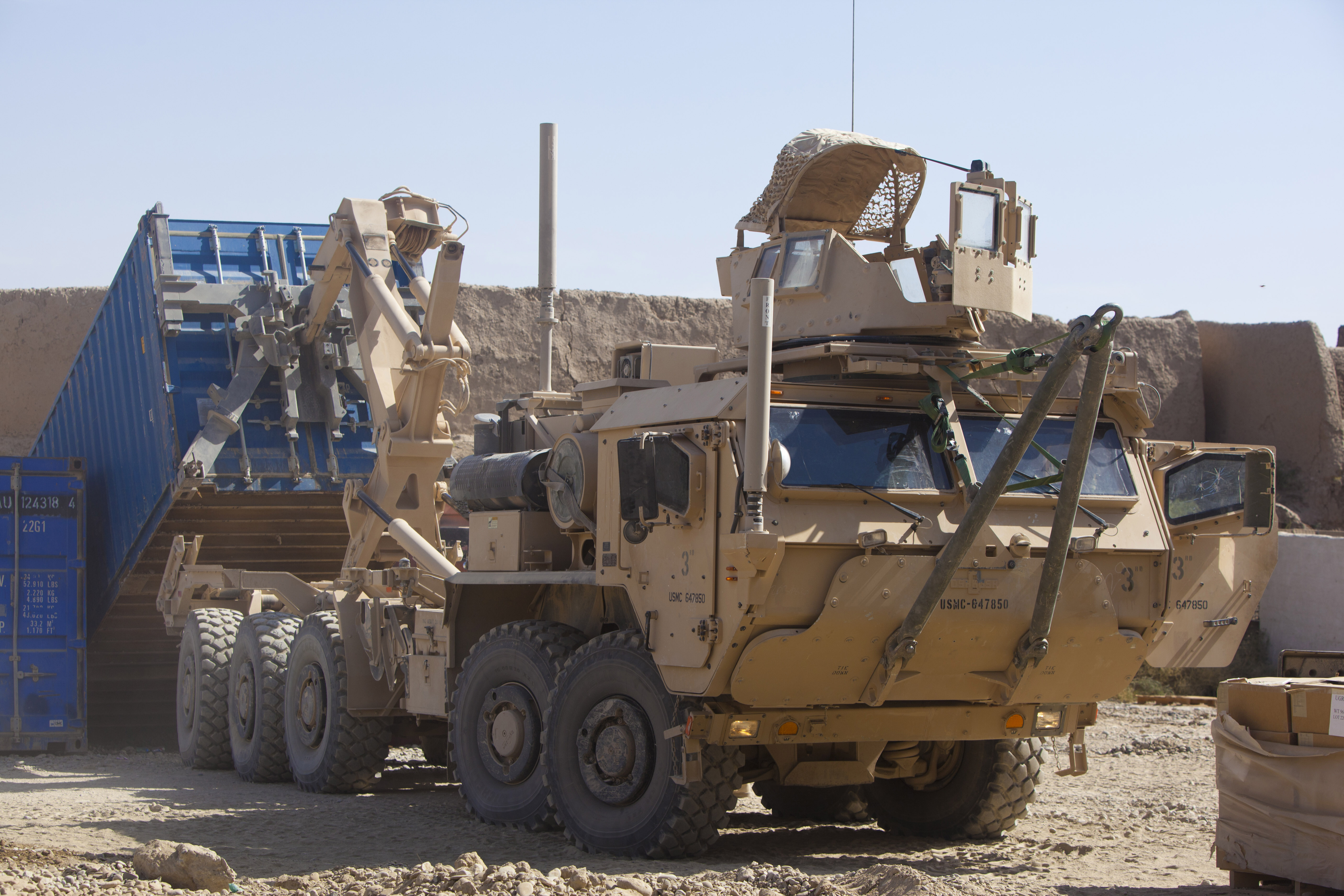
USMC Oshkosh Logistic Vehicle System Replacement (LVSR)

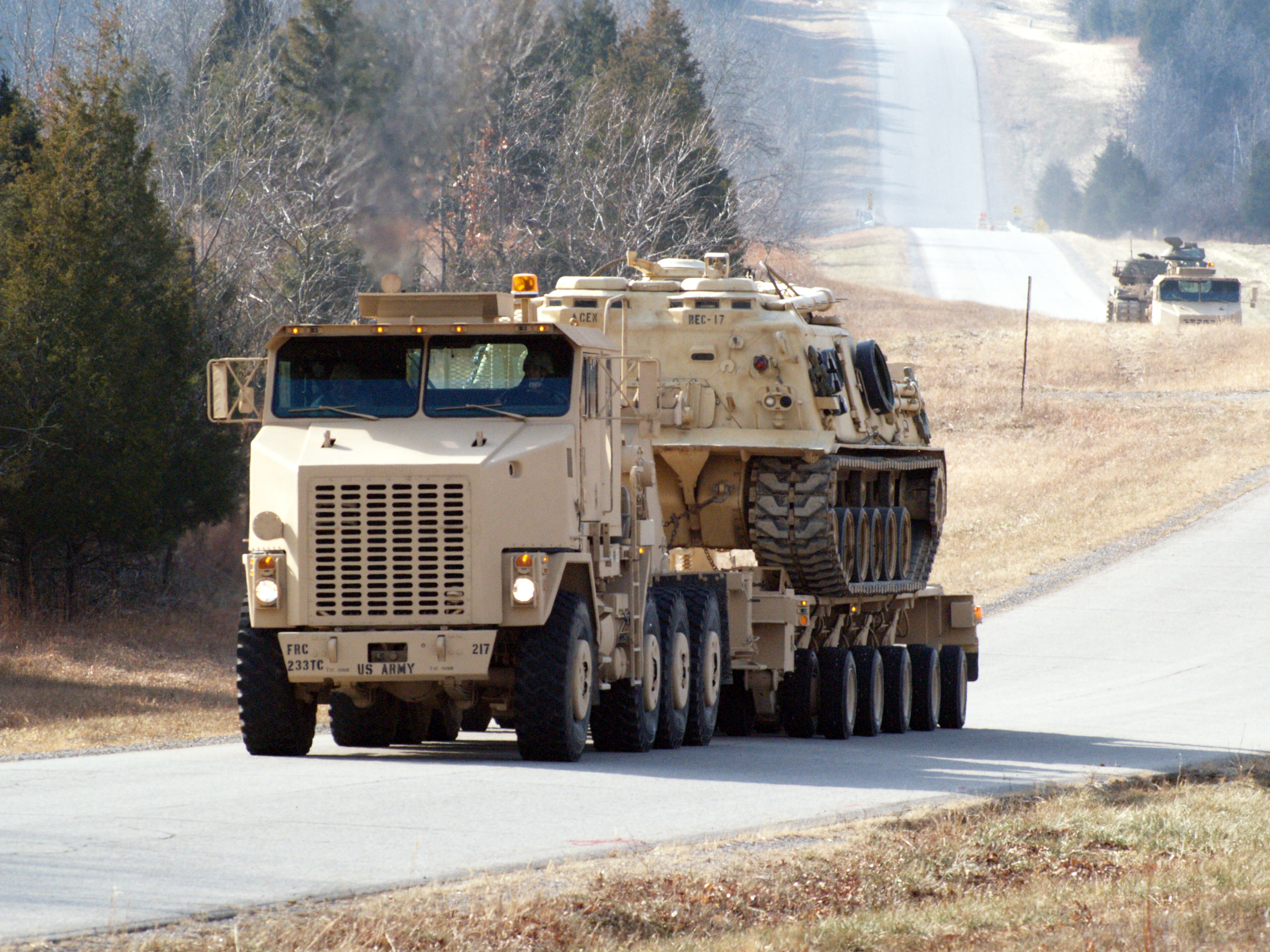
Oshkosh M1070A0 tractor, M1000 semi-trailer and M88 ARV payload

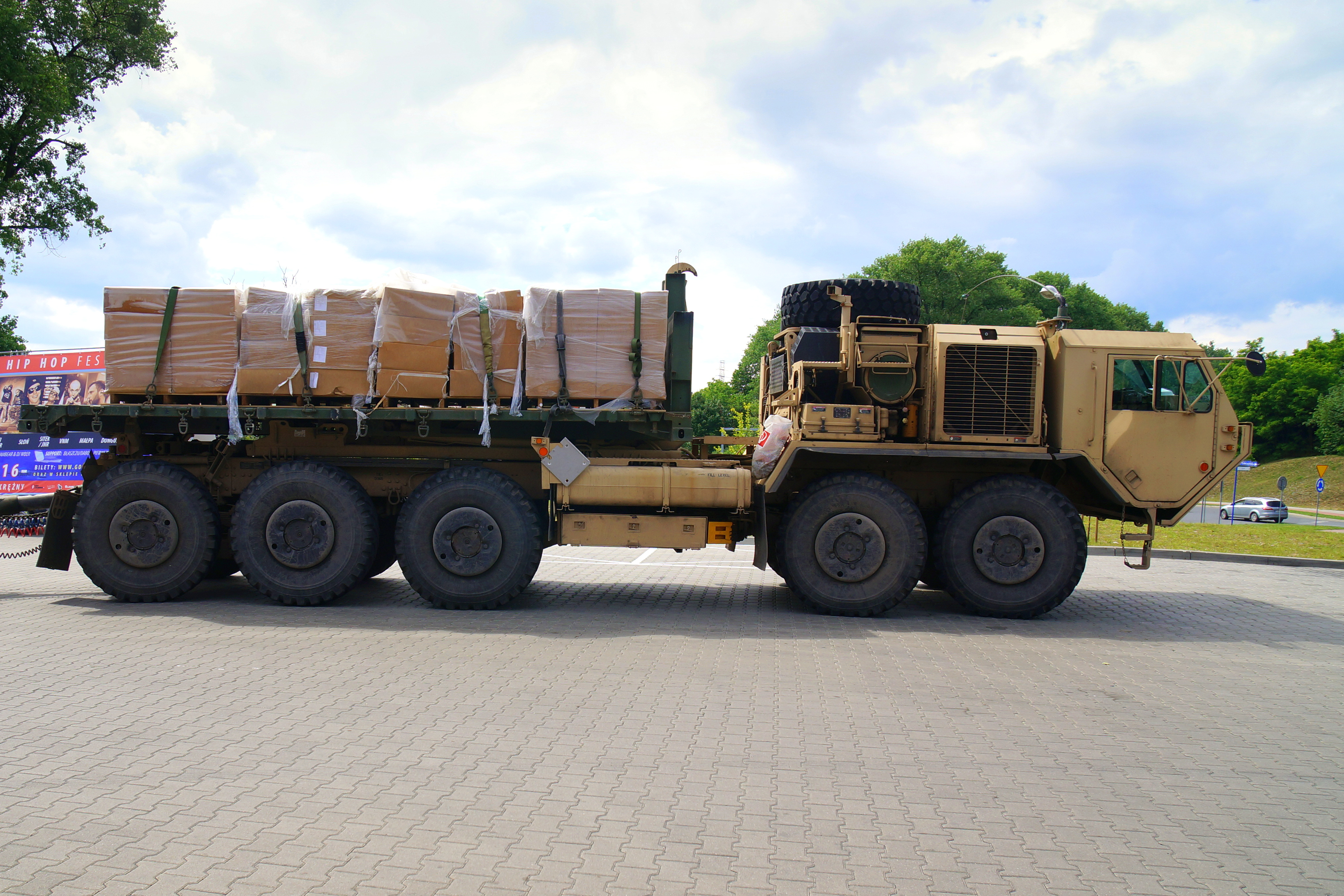
Oshkosh M1075 Palletized Load System (PLS) truck

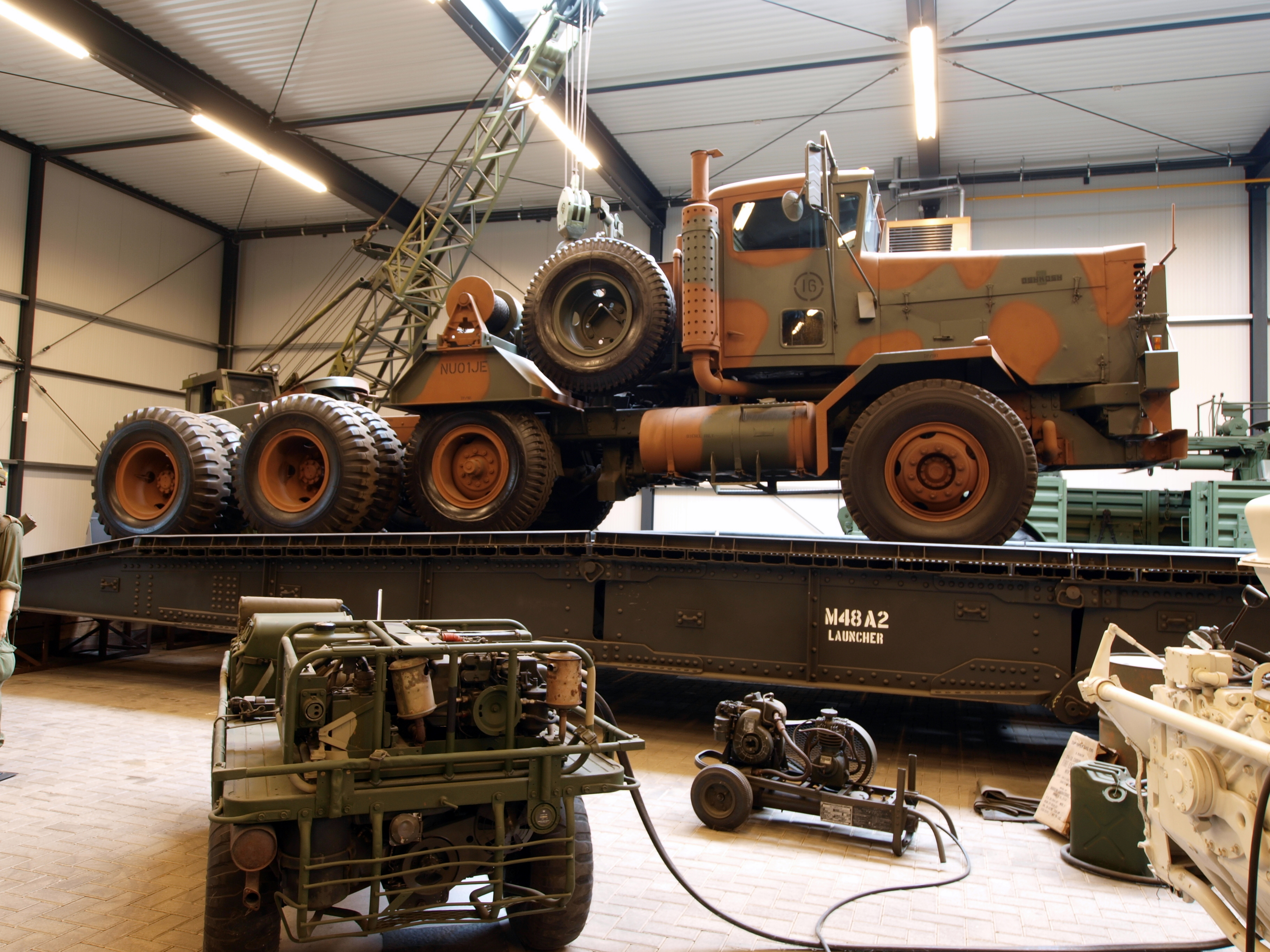
M911 HET on M48A2 launcher bridge
Oshkosh Airport products

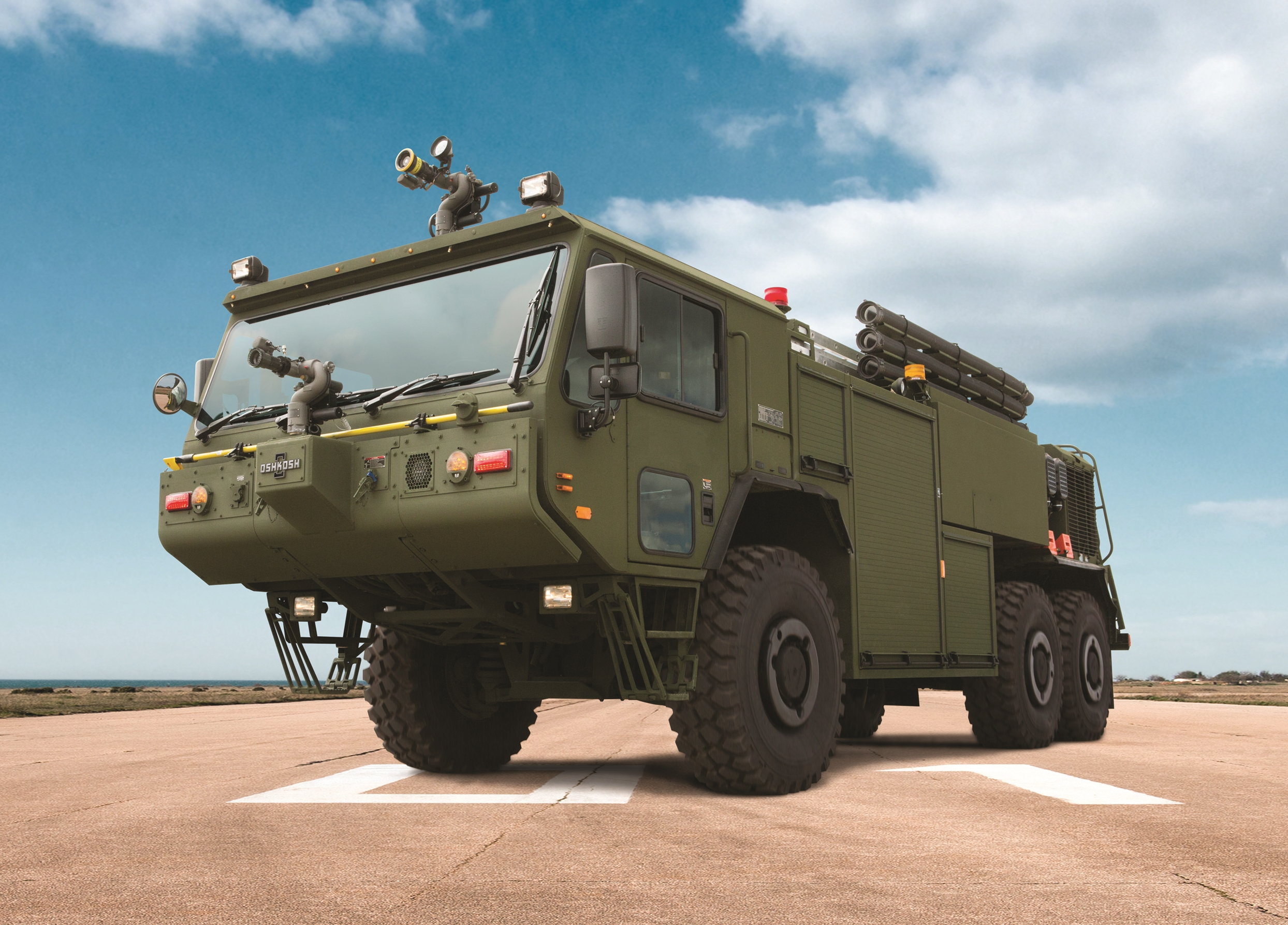
Oshkosh P19-R Aircraft Rescue and Fire Fighting (ARFF) vehicle

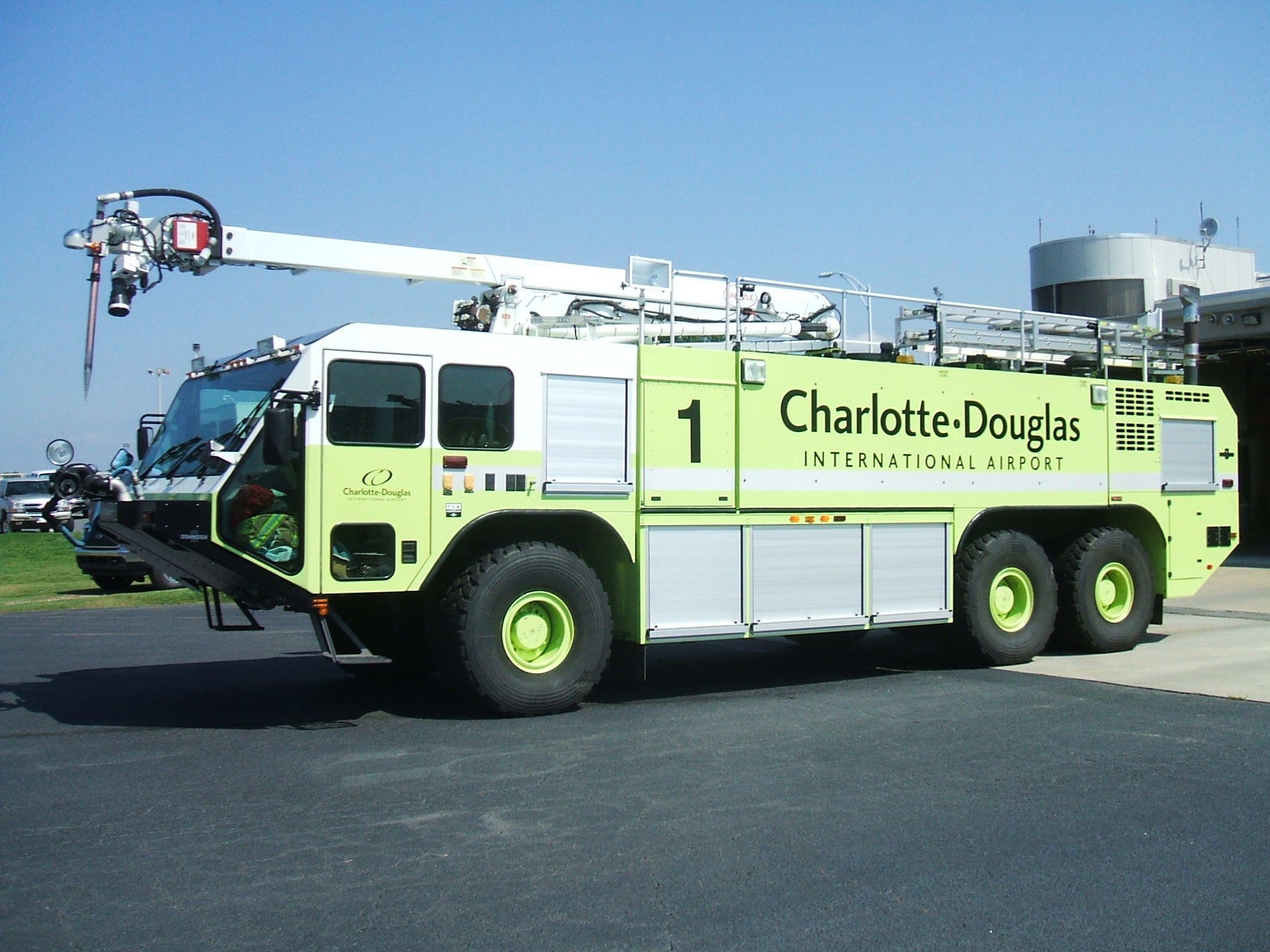
Charlotte-Douglas Airport Oshkosh Striker

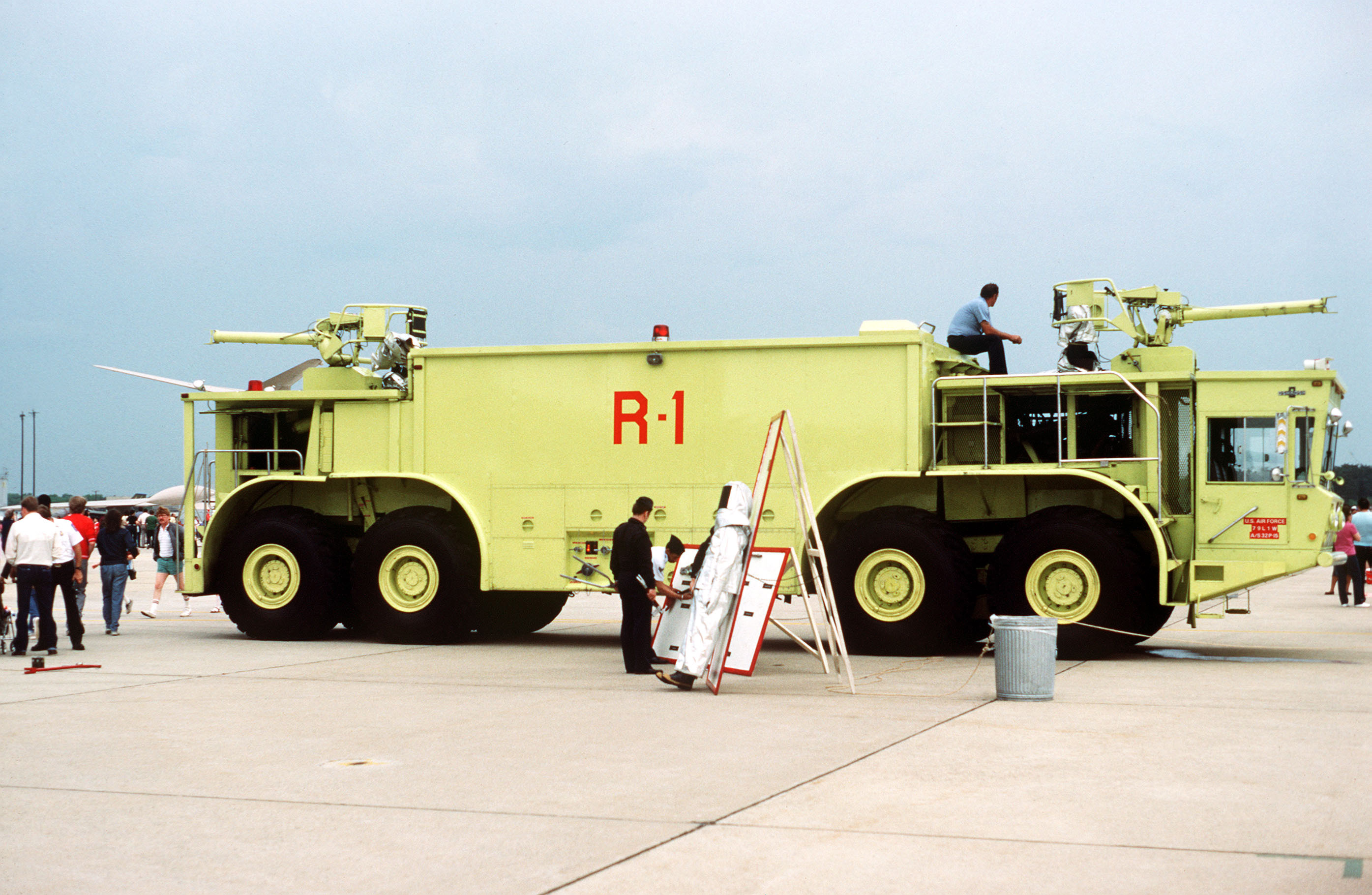
USAF Oshkosh P-15 8x8 airport crash tender

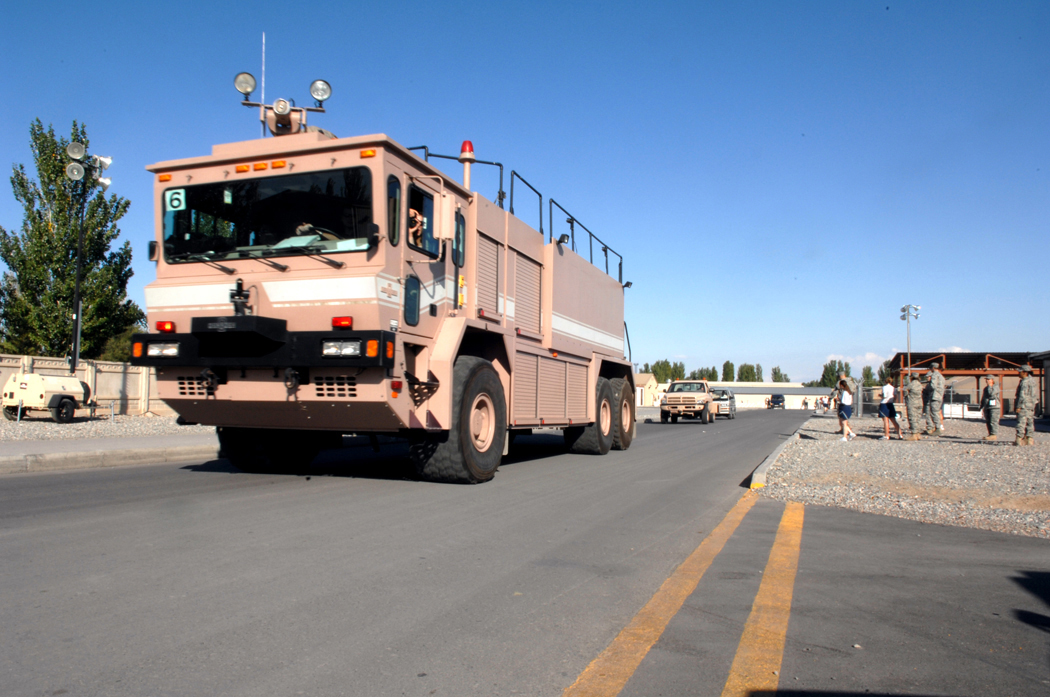
USAF Oshkosh T-3000 6x6 airport crash tender

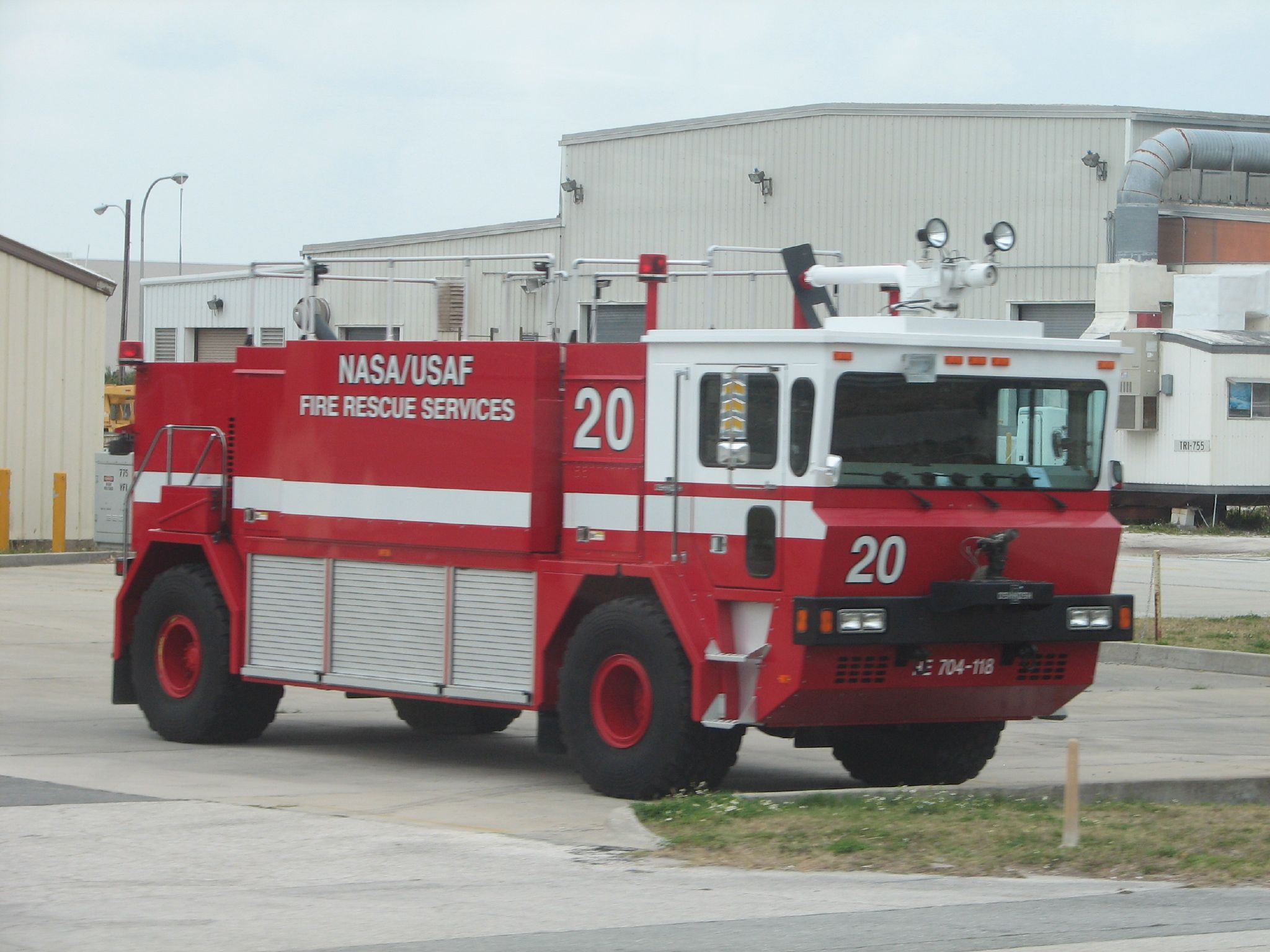
NASA-USAF Oshkosh T-3000 4x4 at KSC in Florida

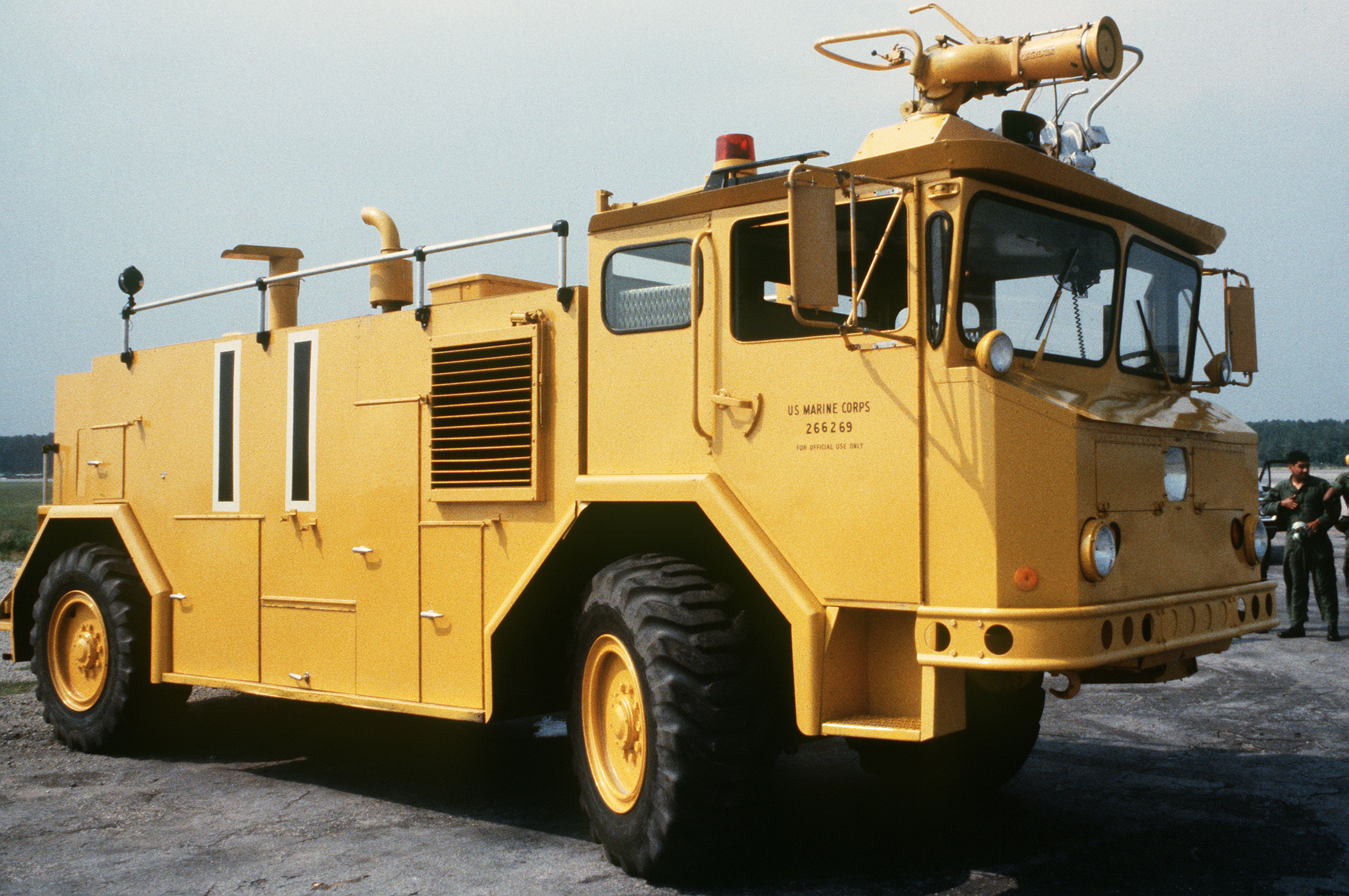
USMC Oshkosh MB1 fire tender
Oshkosh commercial/civil products

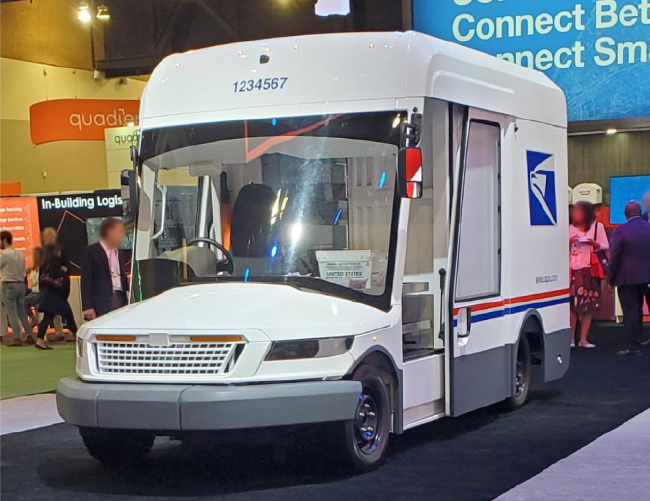
U.S. Postal Service's Next Generation Delivery Vehicle (NGDV)

== Oshkosh acquisitions since 1989 ==
Since 1989, Oshkosh has completed nineteen acquisitions and three divestitures:

- 1989- Oshkosh RV Chassis from Deere and Co. (divested to Freightliner in 1995)
- 1996- Pierce Manufacturing, Inc.
- 1997- Nova Quintech
- 1998- McNeilus Companies, Inc.
- 1999- Kewaunee Fabrications, L.L.C.
- 1999- Viking Truck & Equipment
- 2000- Medtec Ambulance Corporation (Defunct as of July 2012)
- 2001- Geesink Norba Group (divested 2009)
- 2001- TEMCO
- 2004- Jerr-Dan Corporation
- 2004- BAI Corporation (divested 2009)
- 2005- CON-E-CO
- 2005- London Machinery, Inc.
- 2006- AK Specialty Vehicles, now known as Oshkosh Specialty Vehicles.
- 2006- IMT (Iowa Mold Tooling)
- 2006- JLG Industries
- 2020- Pratt & Miller, including Corvette Racing
- 2022- MAXIMETAL
- 2022- Hinowa SpA (pending)
- 2023- JBT Aerotech
- 2024- AUSA Center SA

== See also ==
- Top 100 US Federal Contractors
- M911 tractor unit
