= P19 =

P19 may refer to:

== Aircraft ==
- Aviamilano P.19 Scricciolo, an Italian trainer
- Curtiss P-19, a cancelled American fighter design
- P.Z.L. P.19, a Polish sports plane

== Other uses ==
- P19 cell, an embryonic carcinoma cell line
- P-19 radar, a Soviet radar system
- Papyrus 19, a biblical manuscript
- RNA silencing suppressor p19
- Stellar Airpark, in Maricopa County, Arizona, United States
- P19, a Latvian state regional road
- P-19R, an airport crash tender.
