= Oshkosh TAK-4 Independent Suspension System =

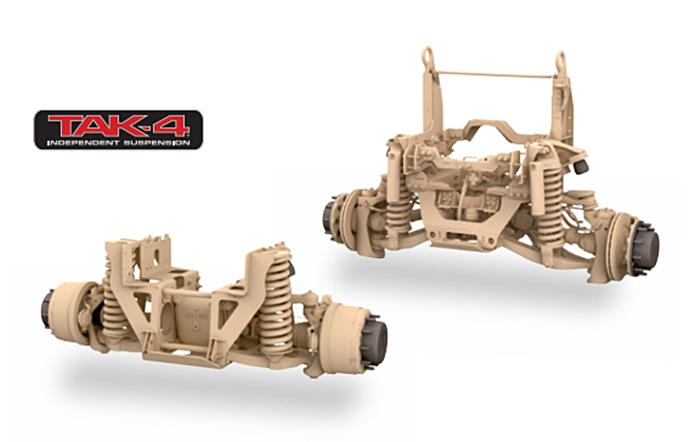
- TAK-4 independent suspension system is a family of independent suspension systems designed and manufactured by Oshkosh Corporation for use on military, severe-duty and emergency vehicles.
- Place of origin: United States of America

Production history
- Designer: Oshkosh
- Manufacturer: Oshkosh Corporation

TAK-4 independent suspension system is a family of independent suspension systems designed and manufactured by Oshkosh Corporation for use on military, severe-duty and emergency vehicles. The system was developed from the mid-1990s.

In addition to third party usage for U.S. Army and Marines Mine Resistant Ambush Protected (MRAP) fleet upgrades, TAK-4 independent suspension system is fitted by Oshkosh to a variety of its military vehicles and by its business unit, Oshkosh Airport Products, to its Striker Aircraft Rescue Fire Fighting (ARFF) trucks and Pierce Manufacturing to its fire apparatuses.

== Development ==
In 1999 Oshkosh was awarded a United States Air Force (USAF) contract to supply P23 ARFF trucks. These, and the earlier P23 supplied to the Air Force between 1994 and 1996 by Teledyne and Emergency-One (E-One) were fitted with independent suspension designed by Timoney Technology of Ireland.

The success of the P23, and subsequent interest in an independent suspension solution for US Army and Marines 5-ton truck upgrade projects led to Oshkosh (and the then Rockwell) approaching Timoney with regard to a licence arrangement for the suspension. Following discussions with both, Timoney opted to enter into a licence arrangement with Rockwell (now Meritor).

Oshkosh then developed two, possibly three independent suspension systems, including the set-up that came to be marketed as TAK-4 independent suspension system.

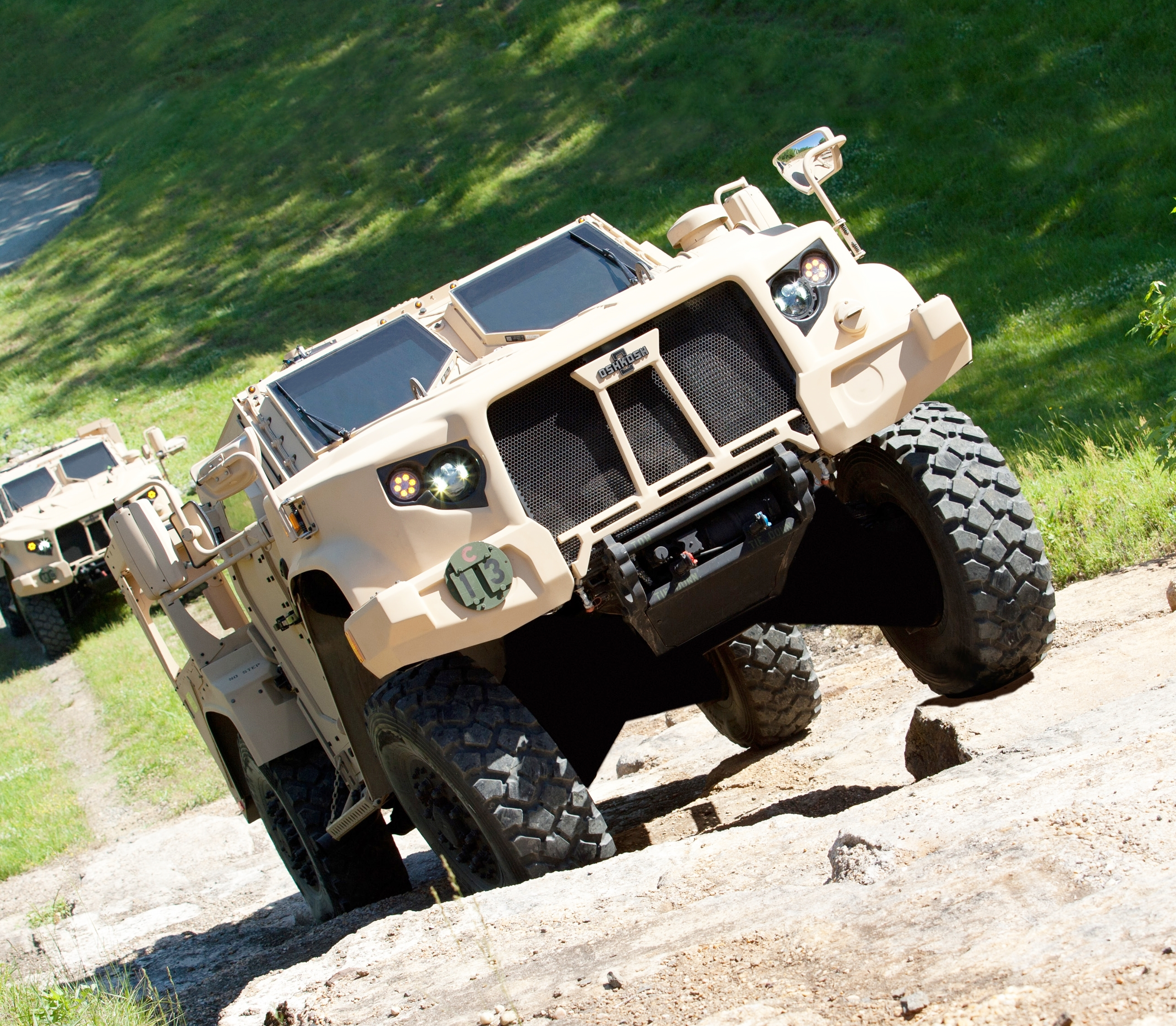
The latest TAK-4i intelligent independent suspension system has been fitted to Oshkosh's L-ATV, this selected to meet the US Army and Marines JLTV requirement.

The first use of TAK-4 independent suspension system was on an M939 5-ton truck as part of the Marines’ plan to upgrade its M939 fleet. The upgrade approach was ultimately abandoned, this replaced by a new-build approach for which the Oshkosh Medium Tactical Vehicle Replacement (MTVR) was selected.

The first production contract for the MTVR was awarded in February 1999 and the type remains in production for the US Marines. The MTVR is fitted with TAK-4 independent suspension system independent suspension and was the first US mass-produced military truck with fully independent suspension (Tatra had been mass-producing independently suspended military trucks since the 1930s).

Oshkosh has since fitted TAK-4 independent suspension system to its Palletized Load System (PLS) trucks, Logistic Vehicle System Replacement (LVSR) trucks and M-ATVs (MRAP – All-Terrain Vehicle), and the system has been retro-fitted to US Army/Marines General Dynamics/Force Protection Cougar MRAPs, BAE Systems’ RG-31 and RG-33 MRAPs. Oshkosh business units Pierce Manufacturing and Oshkosh Airport Products fit TAK-4 independent suspension system systems to a large amount of its fire trucks.

Most recently the latest TAK-4i intelligent independent suspension system has been fitted to Oshkosh's L-ATV (Light Combat Tactical – All-Terrain Vehicle), selected to meet the US Army and Marines JLTV (Joint Light Tactical Vehicle) requirement.

Oshkosh remains the market leader as of 2024 for independent suspension systems above the 5000 kg threshold, almost exclusively for large commercial vehicles, and excluding Striker and Pierce products, has equipped in the region of 30,000 military vehicles with the TAK-4 independent suspension system set-up. This figure will increase as JLTV production ramps up.

To date the TAK-4 independent suspension system has accrued in excess of 1,000,000 actual durability test miles, most of these in extreme conditions.

== Description ==
The Oshkosh TAK-4 (and TAK-4i) suspension is known as double wishbone independent suspension. This is an independent suspension design using two wishbone-shaped arms to locate the wheel. Each arm has two mounting points to the subframe and one joint at the knuckle, and in the case of TAK-4 independent suspension system these arms are of unequal length. The shock absorber and spring mount to the lower arm to control vertical movement. The double-wishbone suspension can also be referred to as ‘double A-arm,’ though the arms themselves can be A-shaped, L-shaped, or even a single bar linkage. The complete TAK-4 independent suspension system set-up also includes a subframe which contains the axle differential, half shafts, and wheel ends with steering attachments and brakes.

TAK-4 independent suspension system accepts various spring mediums, but the vast majority of systems supplied by Oshkosh to date have been fitted with coil springs. Exceptions are the rear axles on the LVSR and the wrecker variant of the MTVR which are hydro-pneumatic struts with Hendrickson components.

The original TAK-4 independent suspension system coil spring set-up as fitted to MTVR, LVSR and PLS A1 (front axles), M-ATV and upgraded MRAPs offers around 16-inches of vertical wheel travel and for MTVR, LVSR and PLS-A1, and has an off-road gross vehicle weight rating (GVWR) of 12,020 kg. The slighter lighter-capacity version fitted to the M-ATV has an off-road GVWR of 10,433 kg. The light version offered as a potential HMMWV upgrade has a GVWR of 10,000 kg and offers around 14-inches of vertical wheel travel. In all cases the operating profile of the system is 70% off-road, 30% on-road.

The new Oshkosh TAK-4i intelligent independent suspension system suspension provides 20-inches of wheel travel, and again a 70% off-road, 30% on-road operating profile. TAK-4i intelligent independent suspension system suspension is fitted to Oshkosh's JLTV/L-ATV. TAK-4i intelligent independent suspension system suspension is an ‘intelligent’ independent suspension, providing variable ride height through gas springs.

To promote TAK-4i intelligent independent suspension system suspension, Oshkosh has stated the following: “In fact, Independent testing proves that the Oshkosh L-ATV provides the same ride quality at speeds 70 percent faster than today’s industry gold standard for off-road mobility, the Oshkosh MRAP All-Terrain Vehicle (M-ATV).”

== TAK-4 Applications ==
(coil springs unless stated)

- M939 5-ton: Development for potential upgrade which evolved into MTVR procurement
- Oshkosh Medium Tactical Vehicle Replacement (MTVR): 11,350 (est.) US Marines/Navy plus 430 (est.) export sales. Rear axles on the MK36 wrecker variant are hydropneumatic struts with Hendrickson International components
- Oshkosh Heavy Expanded Mobility Tactical Truck (HEMTT): Very small quantity of early models to Qatar
- Oshkosh Palletized Load System (PLS A1): >2150. Front axle pair only
- Oshkosh Logistic Vehicle System Replacement (LVSR): 2022. Rear axles are hydropneumatic struts with Hendrickson International components
- Oshkosh M-ATV: 10,000 (est.)
- Oshkosh L-ATV/JLTV: TAK-4i intelligent independent gas spring suspension system suspension; total requirement for 49,099 (Army) and 5500 (Marines)
- Oshkosh S-ATV: Developmental; TAK-4 independent suspension system
- HMMWV upgrade proposal: Developmental; light version
- Family of Medium Tactical Vehicles (FMTV) Enhanced Protection & Mobility Demonstrator (EPMD); upgrade proposal: Developmental
- BAE Systems RG-31 Mk5 MRAP: 97 TAK-4® independent suspension system upgrade kits supplied from February 2010, 21 new-build vehicles in early 2011
- BAE Systems RG-33 MRAP: 390 (4x4) variants retro-fitted
- Force Protection/General Dynamics Cougar: Approx. 2,900 Cougar (in an undisclosed mix of (4x4) and (6x6) were retro-fitted with TAK-4 independent suspension system)
- Force Protection/General Dynamics Ridgback: UK variant of Cougar; single example fitted with TAK-4 independent suspension system for evaluation
- Hawk Extreme: A a wildland firefighting water tender based on the MTVR MK23/MK25 and developed in conjunction with Pierce Manufacturing
- Oshkosh Airport Products Striker: A range of 4x4, 6x6 and 8x8 specialized Aircraft Rescue and Fire Fighting vehicles built by Oshkosh at the Pierce Manufacturing facilities Appleton, Wisconsin
- Pierce Manufacturing: TAK-4 independent suspension system is an option on Pierce Arrow (F), Enforcer (F), Impel (F/R), Dash CF (F/R), Velocity (F/R) and Quantum (F/R) custom chassis
- Oshkosh P-19R Aircraft Rescue and Fire Fighting (ARFF)

== Gallery ==
Oshkosh TAK-4 Independent Suspension System

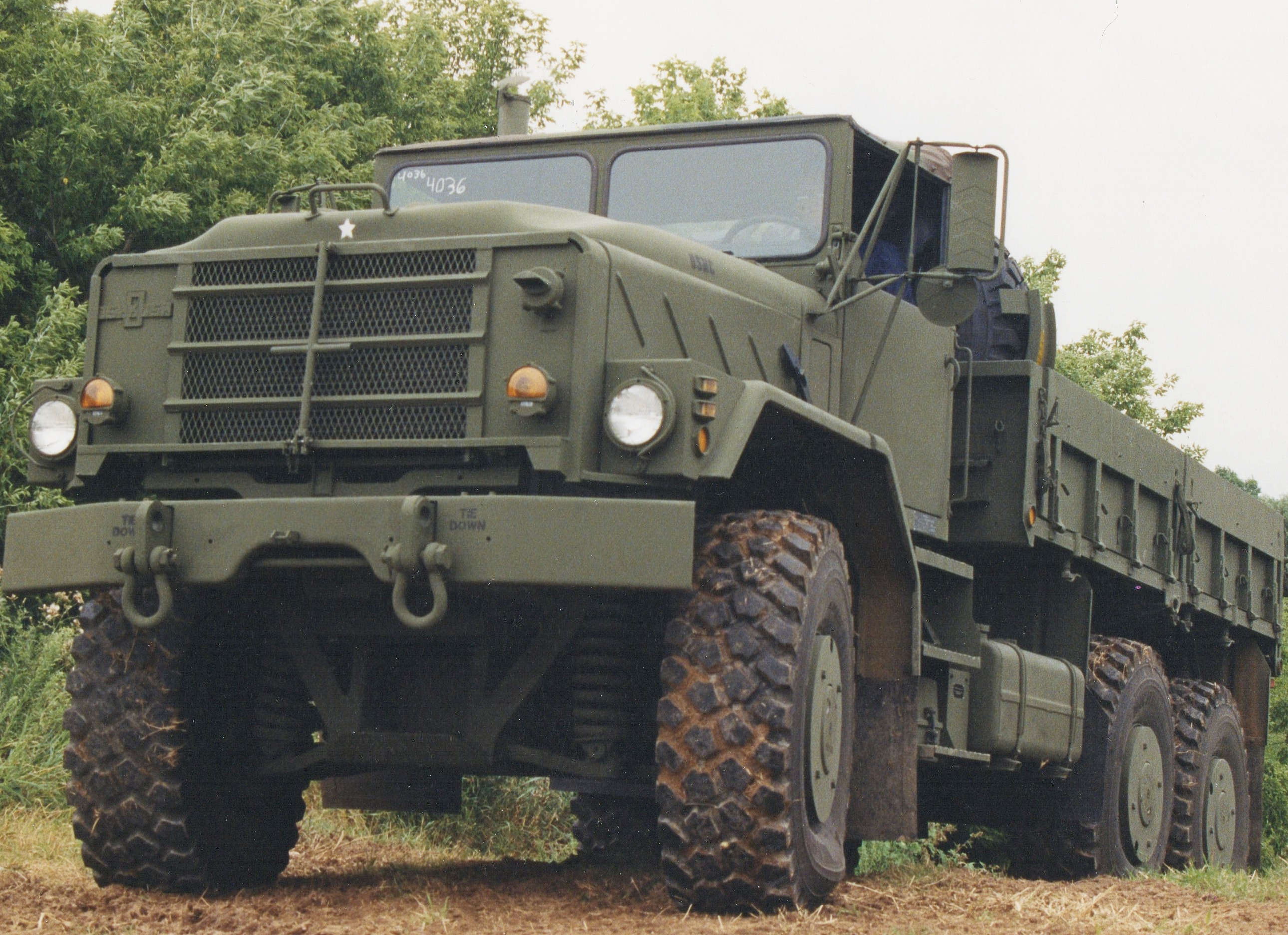
The first use of TAK-4 independent suspension system was on an M939 5-ton truck as part of the Marines’ plan to upgrade its M939 fleet.

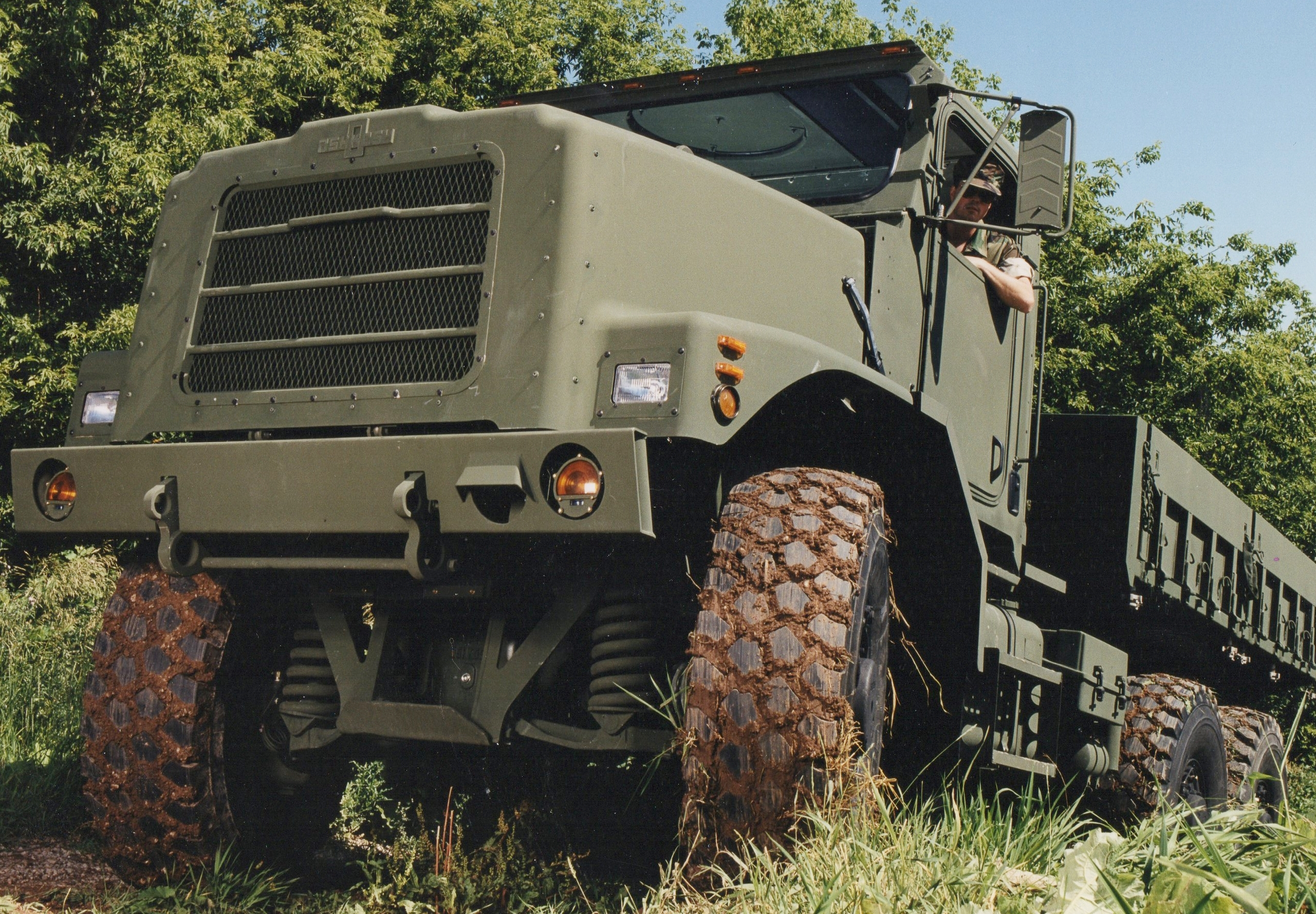
Oshkosh's MTVR is fitted with TAK-4 independent suspension and was the first mass-produced military truck with fully independent suspension.

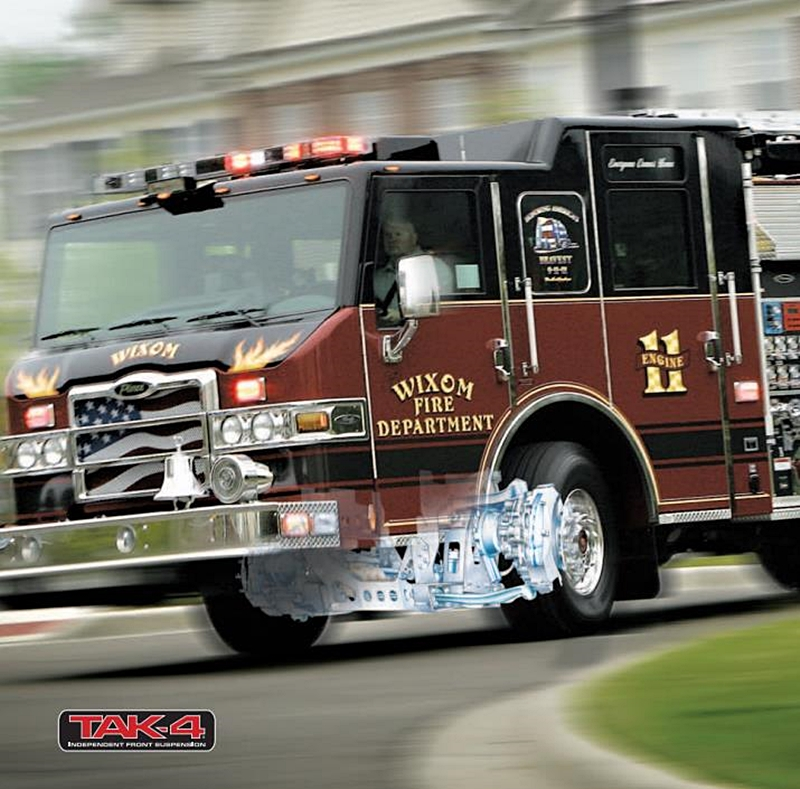
Oshkosh's TAK-4 independent suspension system is an option on the Pierce Arrow (F), Enforcer (F), Impel (F/R), Dash CF (F/R), Velocity (F/R) and Quantum (F/R) custom chassis.

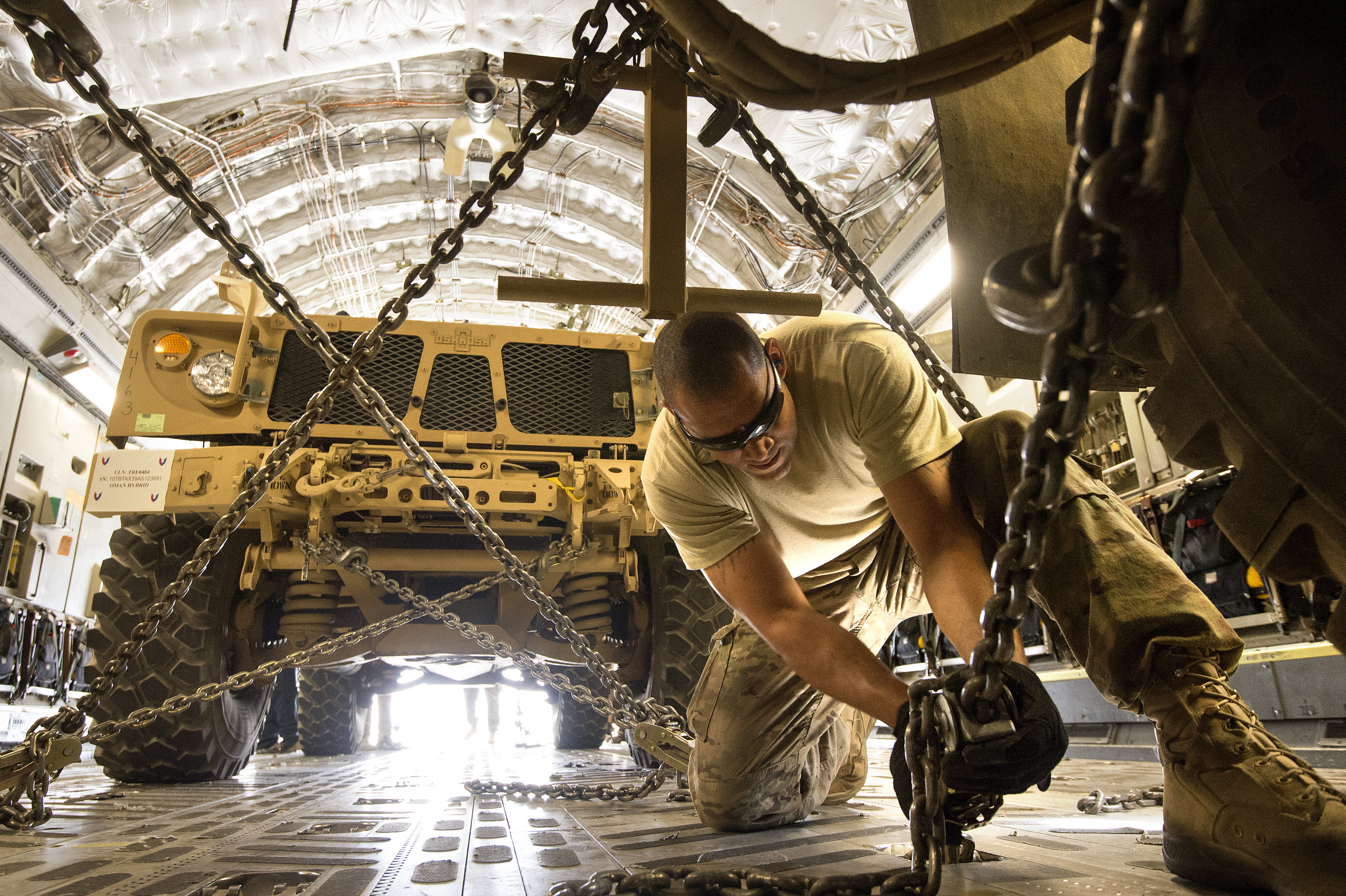
Oshkosh's MRAP – All-Terrain Vehicle (M-ATV) is fitted with TAK-4 independent suspension. About 10,000 M-ATVs have been built to date

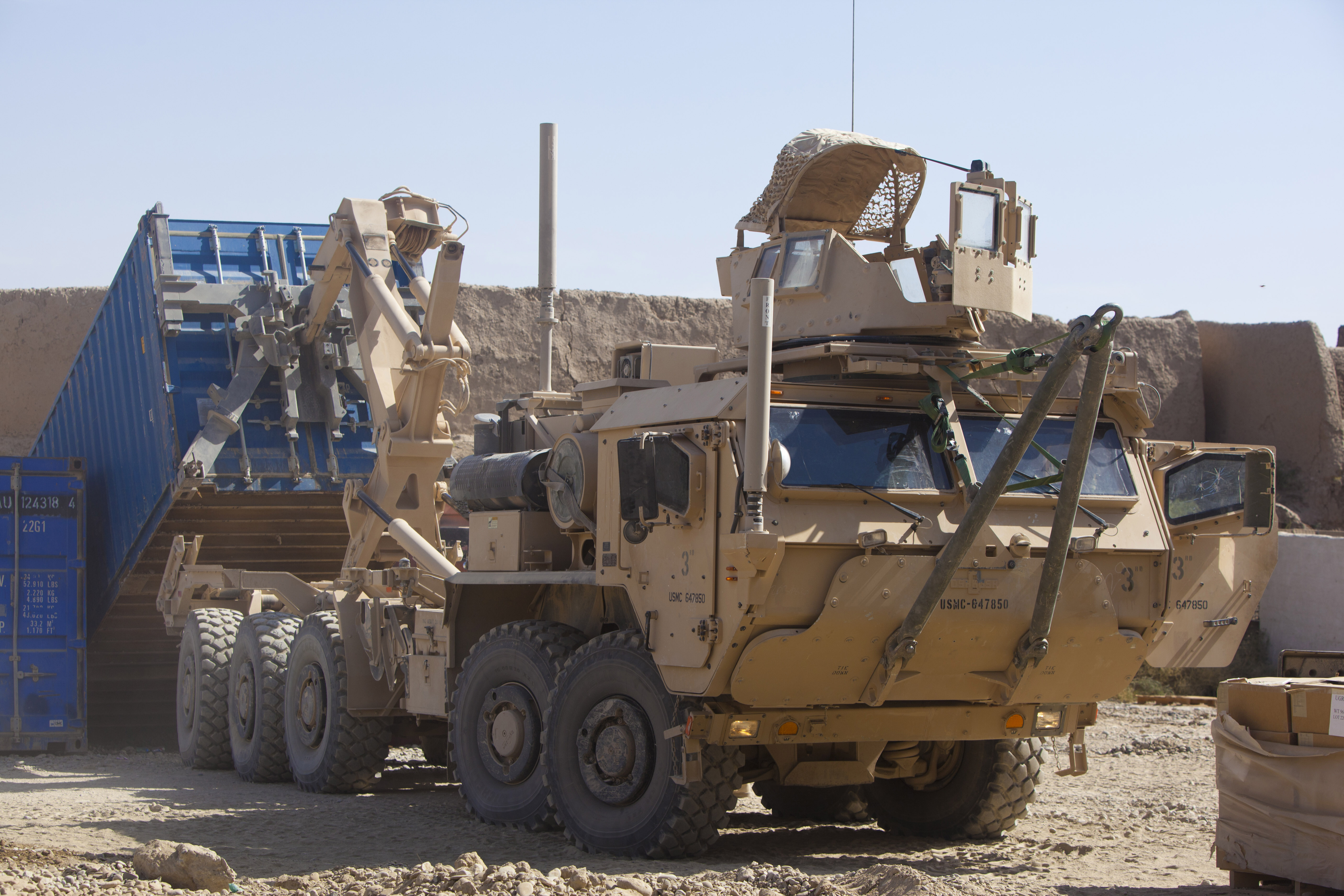
The front axle pair of Oshkosh's Logistic Vehicle System Replacement (LVSR) 2022 are fitted with TAK-4, the rear axles are hydropneumatic struts with Hendrickson International components

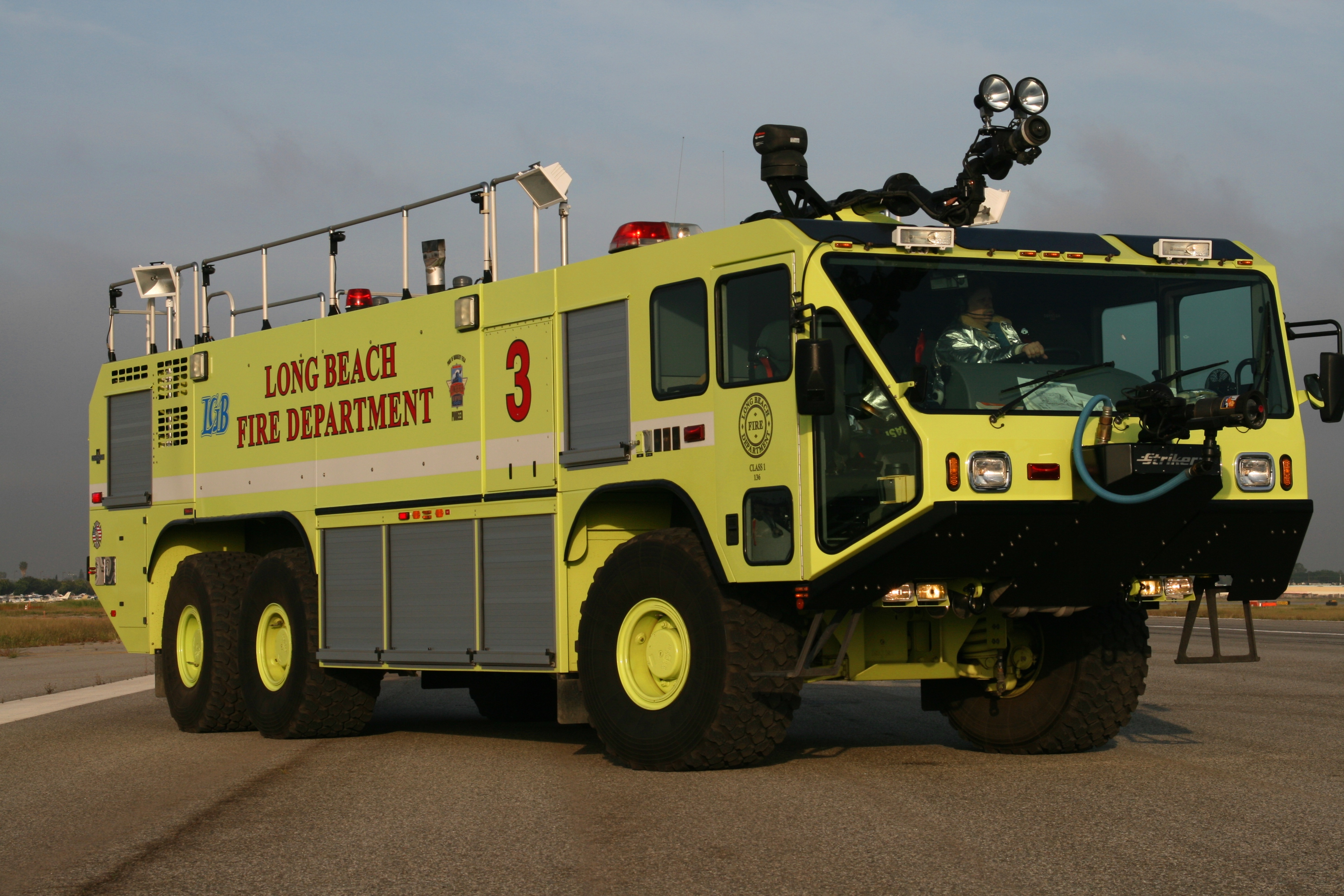
Oshkosh's Striker range of specialized Aircraft Rescue and Fire Fighting vehicles are fitted with TAK-4 independent suspension

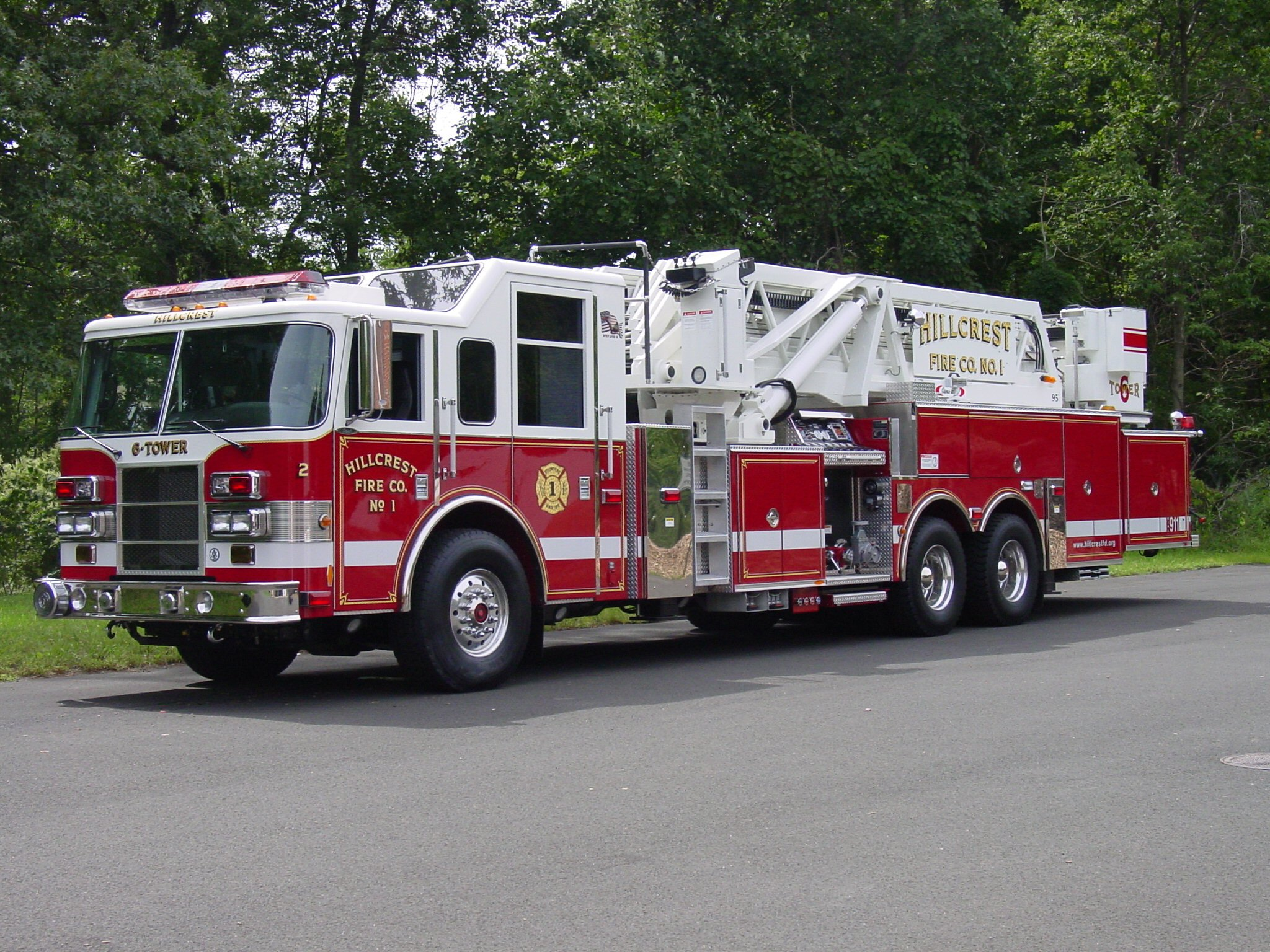
Oshkosh's TAK-4 independent suspension system is an option on the front or rear axles of the Pierce Dash

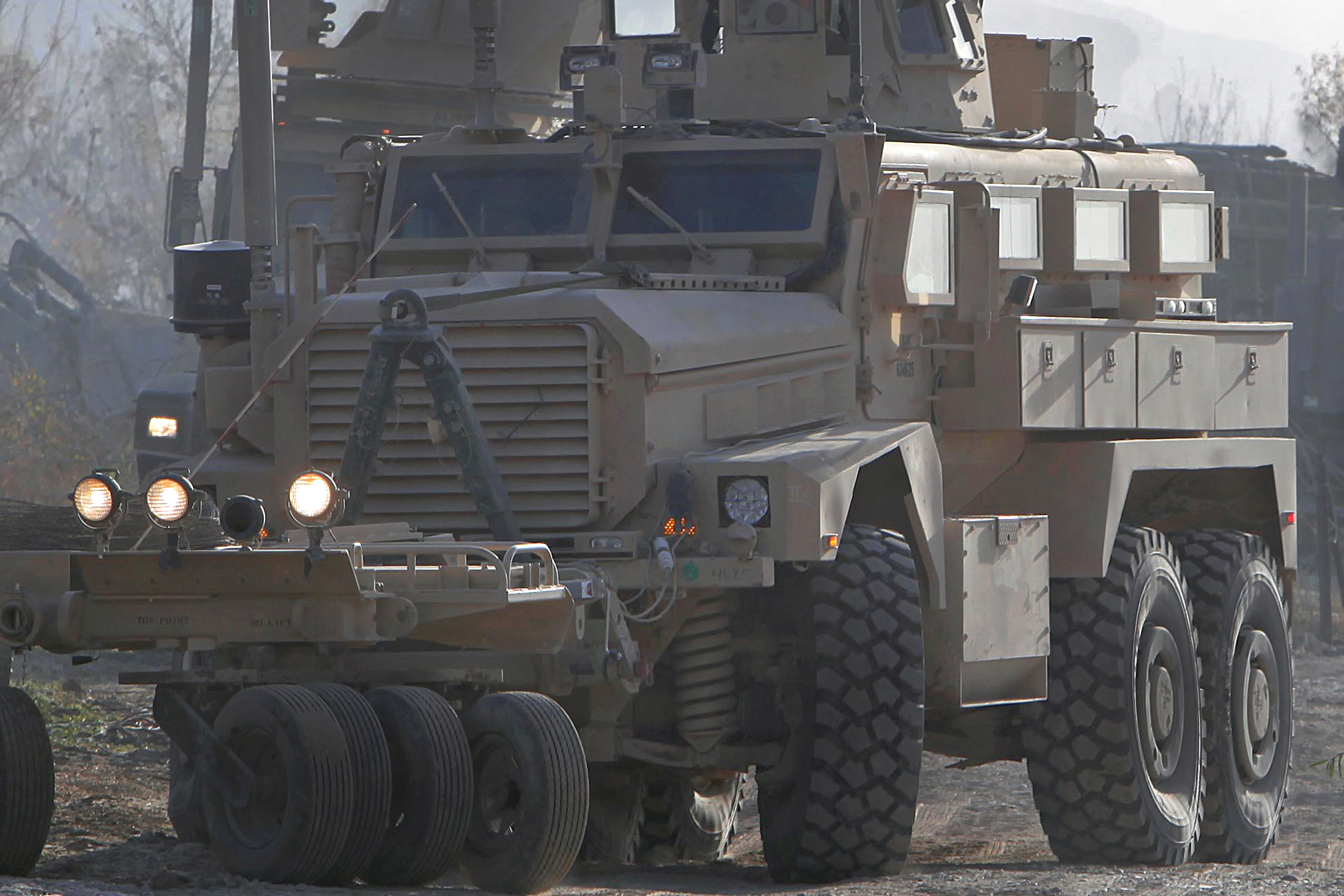
Oshkosh's TAK-4 independent suspension system has been retro-fitted to US Army/Marines MRAPs including the General Dynamics/Force Protection Cougar

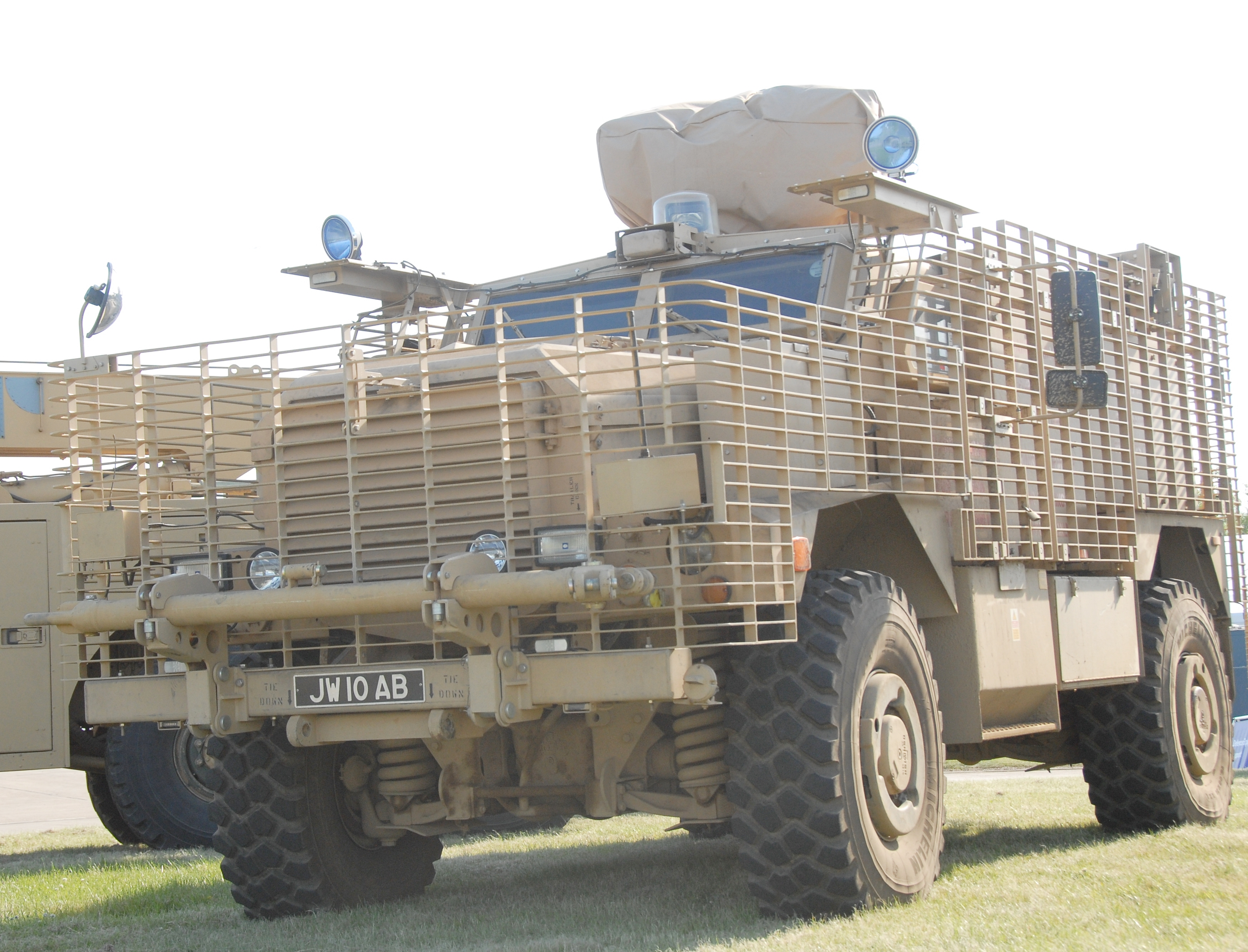
A single example of the British Army's Ridgback MRAP (UK-specific version of Cougar) has been fitted with Oshkosh's TAK-4 independent suspension for evaluation
