= Oshkosh P-19R Aircraft Rescue and Fire Fighting vehicle =

Oshkosh P-19R Aircraft Rescue and Fire Fighting (ARFF) vehicle
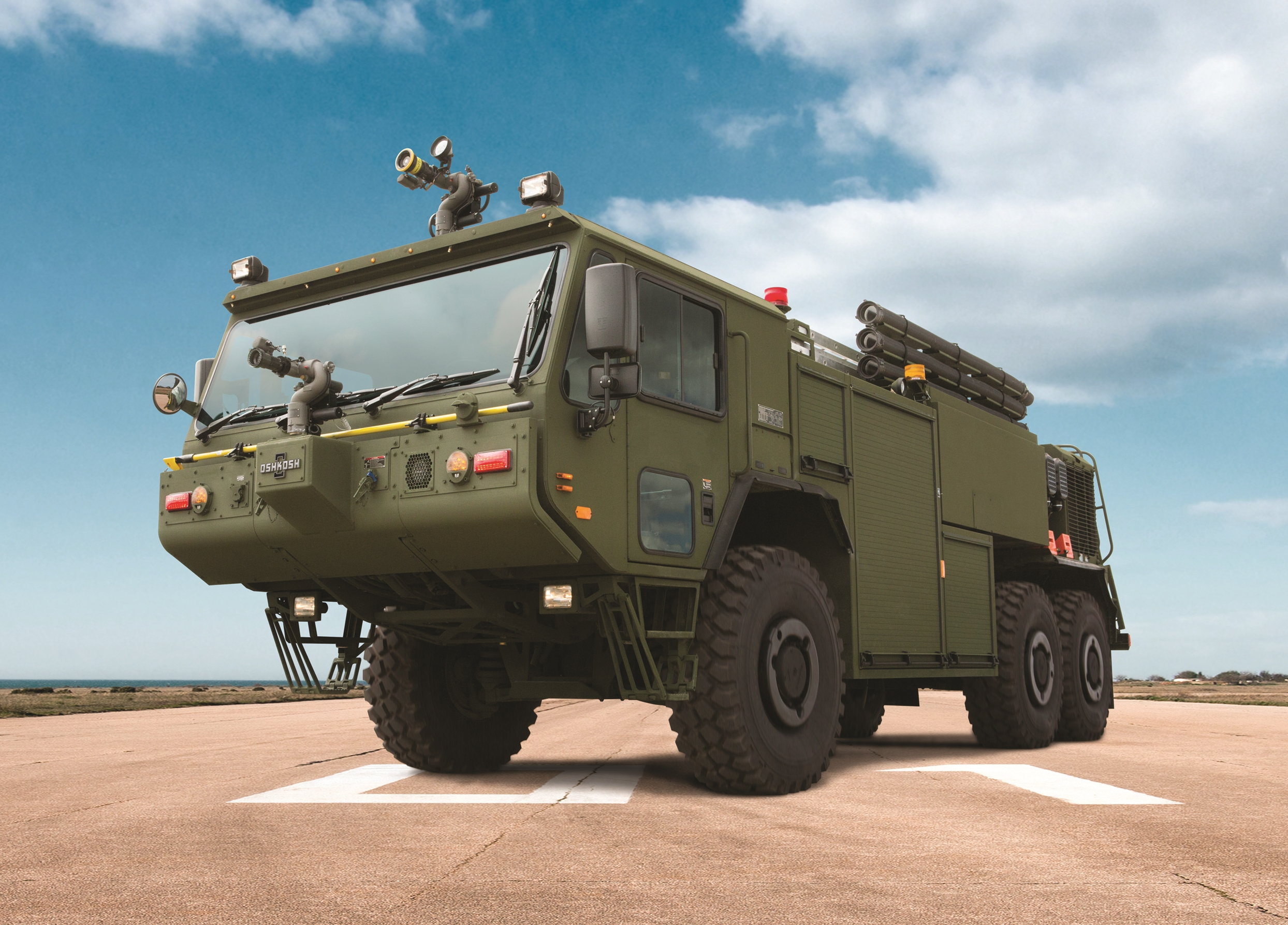
- Aircraft Rescue and Fire Fighting (ARFF) vehicle.
- Type: Aircraft Rescue and Fire Fighting (ARFF) vehicle
- Place of origin: United States

Service history
- In service: June 2017
- Used by: U.S. Marines

Production history
- Designer: Oshkosh
- Designed: June 2012-May 2013
- Manufacturer: Oshkosh Corporation
- No. built: Low Rate Initial Production (2015); Full Rate production (FRP) decision August 2016; 164 ordered by November 2017

Specifications
- Mass: 16,220 kilograms (35,760 lb) curb weight, 21,775 kilograms (48,005 lb) Gross Vehicle Weight Rating (GVWR)
- Length: 33.17 ft (10.11 m)
- Width: 8.50 ft 1 in (2.62 m)
- Height: 10.5 ft (3.20 m)
- Crew: 4 (driver + 3)
- Engine: Caterpillar (CAT) C-15 15.2-liter, 6-cylinder inline water-cooled diesel developing 600 hp and 1850 ft-lbs torque.
- Payload capacity: 1,000 gallons of water, 130 gallons of foam agent, and 500 lbs of Halotron auxiliary firefighting agent
- Transmission: Allison 4700 SP seven-speed fully automatic transmission and Oshkosh 35000 Series single-speed transfer case
- Suspension: Oshkosh TAK-4 (ISS with coil springs)
- Fuel capacity: 265 litres (70 gal)
- Operational range: 262 miles (422 km)
- Maximum speed: 116 km/h (72 mph)
- Steering system: power-assisted, front wheels

The Oshkosh P-19R is an Aircraft Rescue and Fire Fighting (ARFF) vehicle and it was selected by the United States Marine Corps in 2013. The first delivery occurred in June 2017, Initial Operating Capability (IOC) followed in February 2018, and in service the P-19R serves as a first-response vehicle in aircraft fire emergencies at military bases and expeditionary airfields.

== History ==
Oshkosh announced on May 30, 2013, that it had been selected by the US Marine Corps to supply its next-generation Aircraft Rescue and Fire Fighting (ARFF) vehicles. The P-19 Replacement (P-19R) will replace the Oshkosh P-19A fleet which was first fielded in 1984 and is reaching the end of its service life. The P-19R contract extends through May 2018 and has a total estimated value of $192 million ($192,852,826 quoted).

Following the delivery of three prototype vehicles in December 2013 for testing, in April 2015 it was disclosed the P-19R had successfully completed all required government development testing and evaluation and readiness reviews required to move the program through Milestone C approval and into Low Rate Initial Production (LRIP). A delivery order was placed and LRIP commenced that month, with vehicles slated for delivery to support Product Verification Testing (PVT). Six LRIP vehicles were delivered in February 2016 to the Aberdeen Test Center in Aberdeen Maryland for PVT and Cherry Point North Carolina for First Unit Equipped (FUE) testing. Testing was conducted from March 2016 through June 2016. A Full Rate Production (FRP) decision was announced by Oshkosh on August 18, 2016.

On 22 May 2017 Oshkosh announced that the U.S. Marine Corps has awarded the company a delivery order valued at more than $33 million for an additional 54 P-19Rs. Oshkosh stated the company expected to deliver the first P-19Rs in June 2017 and in total would deliver 164 P-19Rs through 2019. On 27 July 2017 Oshkosh announced that the U.S. Marine Corps had awarded the company a delivery order valued at more than $16 million for an additional 23 P-19Rs. On 2 November 2017 Oshkosh announced that the U.S. Marine Corps had awarded the company a delivery order valued at more than $19 million for an additional 31 P-19Rs for delivery through 2019. Oshkosh announced on 6 February 2018 that the P-19R had reached its Initial Operating Capability (IOC) milestone. The P-19R contract extends through 2018 and between 164 and 200 vehicles can be ordered, with 60 vehicles delivered by February 2018.

== Technical description ==
The P-19R is based on a conventional C-section rigid chassis, the wheelbase of which is 4.851 m. Motive power is provided by a rear-mounted transverse 15.2-litre Caterpillar C15 six-cylinder in-line turbocharged, water-cooled four-stroke diesel, developing 600 hp (448 kW), this coupled to an Allison 4700 SP seven-speed fully automatic transmission and Oshkosh 35000 Series single-speed transfer case. This set-up is shared with Oshkosh's Logistic Vehicle System Replacement (LVSR) which is also in service with the Marines.

Suspension is Oshkosh TAK-4 fully independent double wishbone all-round, and by coil springs with 16-inches of independent wheel travel. TAK-4 suspension is fitted to the Marines’ LVSR and Medium Tactical Vehicle Replacement (MTVR) fleets, and is also fitted to the Oshkosh M-ATVs and upgraded Cougar MRAPs that are being retained by the Marines post-Afghanistan. The P-19R is fitted with Michelin XZL 16.00 R 20 tires. A Dana central tire inflation system (CTIS) is fitted, this allowing the driver to adjust tire pressures to suit the terrain being crossed. A spare wheel/tire is carried at the rear of the vehicle.

The cab seats four, a driver and three crew. The driver sits centrally.

The P-19R is equipped with a power divider that allows the vehicle to drive and pump simultaneously. In addition to hoses, ladders and other fire and rescue equipment, the P-19R carries 1000 gallons of water, 130 gallons of foam agent, and 500 lb of Halotron auxiliary firefighting agent. The roof and bumper turrets combined, will discharge up to 750 gallons of water per minute, and at up to 1000 ft from a fire.

Cross-lay hose beds in the main body offer convenient access to fire hoses that can be used for structural fires or to draw water from a hydrant or natural source such as a river or pond. On the underside of the P-19R there are nozzles that can discharge 56 liters of water and foam to extinguish a fire or fuel spill underneath the vehicle. In front of the vehicle Oshkosh has installed nozzles that spray water and foam on the windshield to keep it cool.

The P-19R is also equipped with Oshkosh's Command Zone integrated control and diagnostic system originally developed for the company's commercial fire-fighting vehicle in 1999. Command Zone is a computer-controlled, electronics technology that operates and diagnoses all major vehicle networks. The backbone of the system is multiplexing technology that allows vehicle components to work in concert, streamlining diagnostic and troubleshooting efficiencies. Both a local and remote monitoring system, it allows real-time access to critical vehicle information via command and control networks, laptops, on-board display screens or hand-held personal digital devices.

== Gallery ==
Oshkosh P-19R Aircraft Rescue and Fire Fighting (ARFF) vehicle

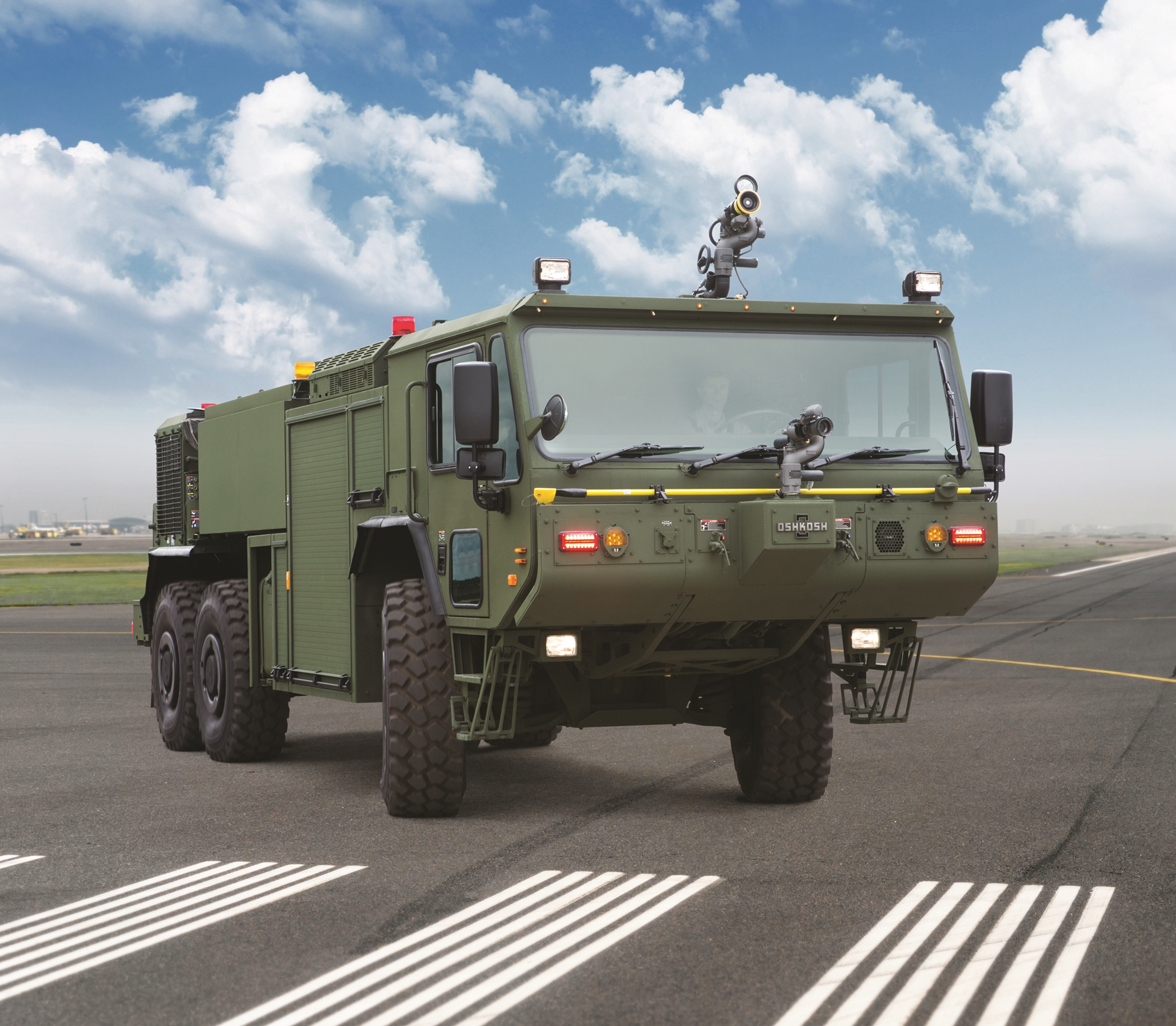
Low Rate Initial Production (LRIP) standard Oshkosh Aircraft Rescue and Fire Fighting (ARFF) vehicle

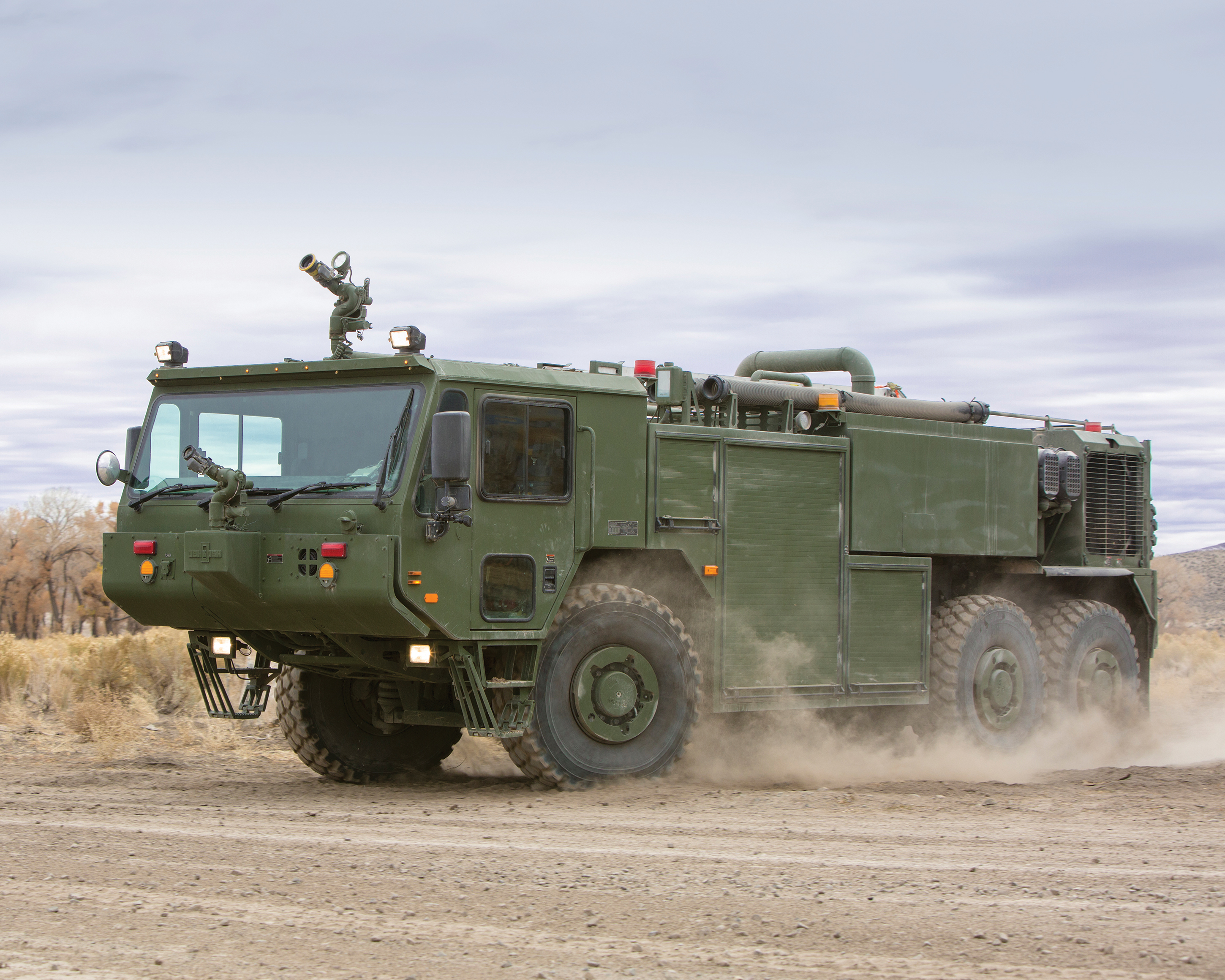
One of the first Oshkosh P-19R Aircraft Rescue and Fire Fighting (ARFF) vehicles

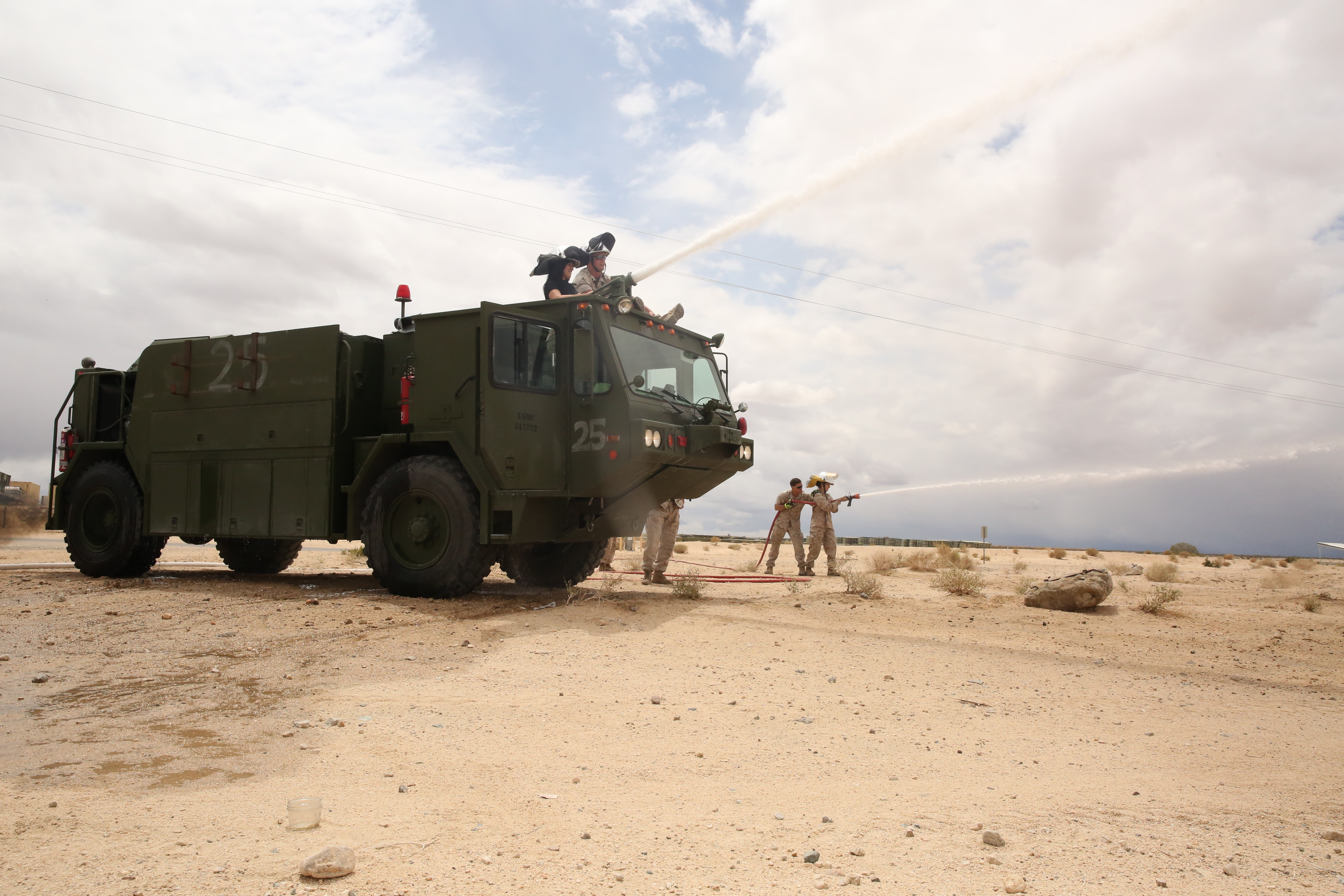
The Oshkosh P-19R (R – Replacement) will replace this, the Oshkosh P-19A

== See also ==
- Oshkosh Corporation
- Oshkosh TAK-4 Independent Suspension System
- Aircraft rescue and firefighting
- Oshkosh Logistic Vehicle System Replacement (LVSR)
- Oshkosh Striker
- Airport crash tender
