= Oshkosh M-ATV =

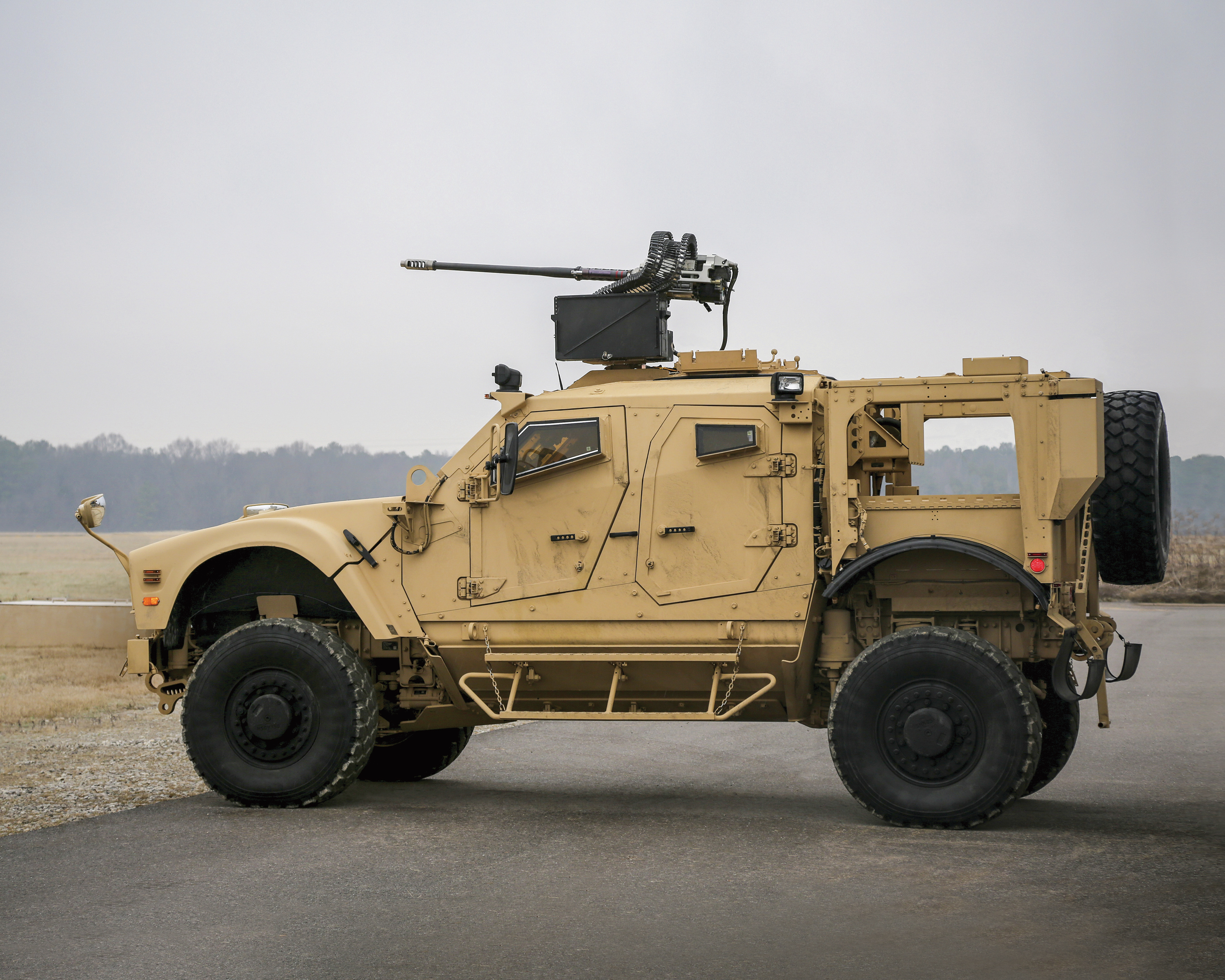
- An Oshkosh M-ATV in January 2014
- Type: Mine-Resistant Ambush Protected Vehicle (MRAP)
- Place of origin: United States

Service history
- In service: 2009–present
- Used by: See Operators section below
- Wars: War in Afghanistan; Syrian Civil War; Yemeni Civil War; Russo-Ukrainian War

Production history
- Designer: Oshkosh / Plasan
- Designed: 2009
- Manufacturer: Oshkosh Corporation
- Unit cost: $470,000+
- Produced: 2009–present
- No. built: approaching 10,000

Specifications
- Mass: Curb weight: 27,500 lb (12,500 kg); Gross weight: 32,500 lb (14,700 kg)
- Length: 246.8 inches (6,270 mm)
- Width: 98.1 inches (2,490 mm)
- Height: 105 inches (2,700 mm)
- Crew: 4+1 gunner
- Armor: Plasan composite
- Main armament: 1× 7.62×51mm NATO (.308 in) M240 machine gun, 1× 40 mm Mk 19 grenade launcher, 1x Mk 47 Striker; 1× .50 in (12.7 mm) M2 Browning heavy machine gun, or 1× BGM-71 TOW anti-tank guided missile launcher 1× MILAN anti-tank guided missile (in Saudi M-ATV)
- Engine: 7.2 L Caterpillar C7 I6; 370 hp (276 kW; 375 PS); 925 lb⋅ft (1,254 N⋅m)
- Power/weight: 23 hp/ton
- Payload capacity: 4,000 pounds (1,800 kg)
- Transmission: Allison 3500SP, 6-speed automatic with manumatic shifting
- Suspension: 4x4, TAK-4 independent suspension
- Ground clearance: 375 mm
- Operational range: 320 miles (510 km)
- Maximum speed: 65 miles per hour (105 km/h) (electronically limited)

The Oshkosh M-ATV is a mine-resistant ambush protected (MRAP) vehicle developed by the Oshkosh Corporation for the MRAP All Terrain Vehicle (M-ATV) program. Intended to replace M1114 HMMWVs (Humvee), it is designed to provide the same levels of protection as the larger and heavier previous MRAPs, but with improved mobility.

== History ==
=== Requirements and selection ===
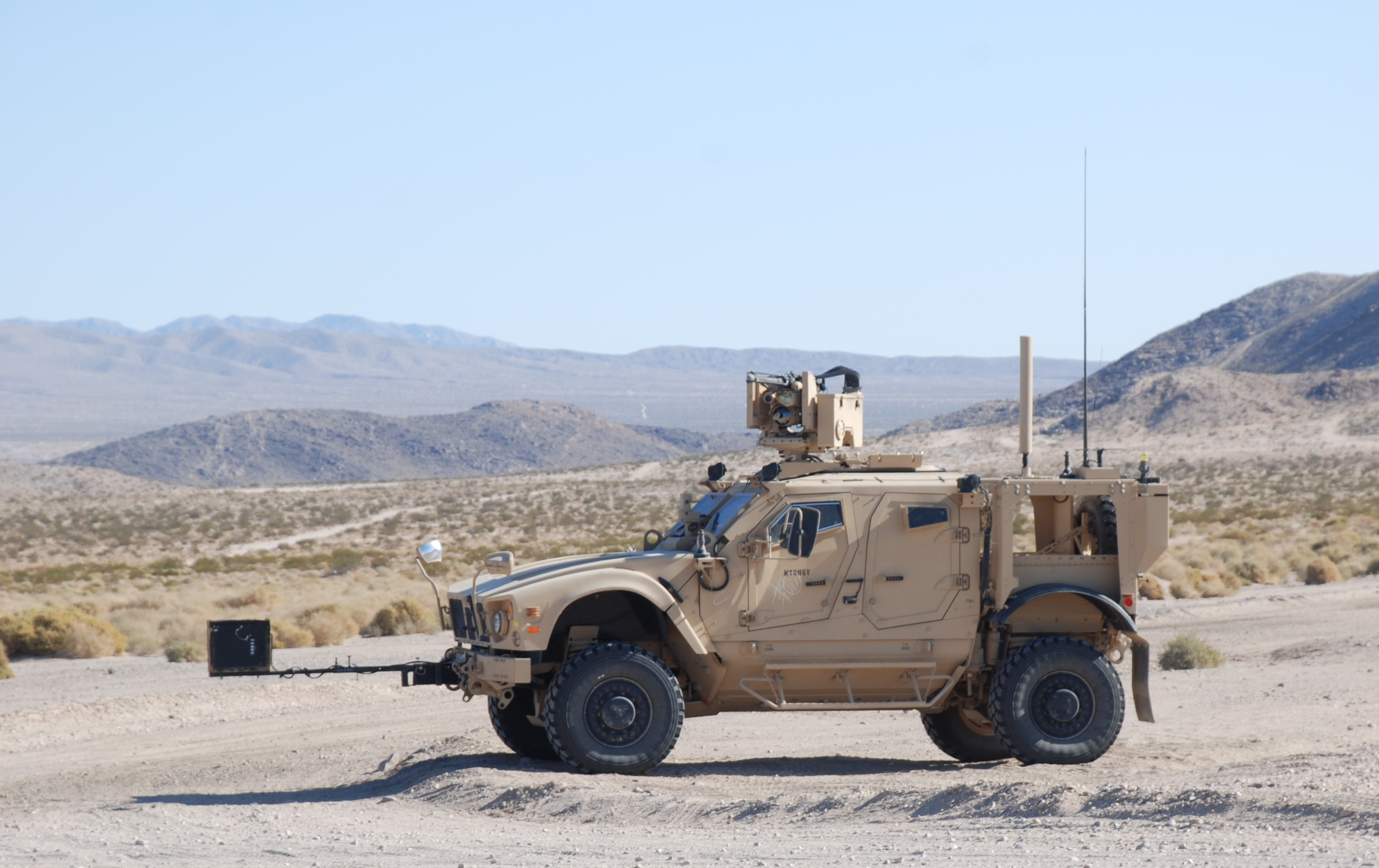
M-ATV at the Fort Irwin National Training Center in November 2011

In the summer of 2008, the U.S. Department of Defense (DoD) began to examine the possibility of developing and procuring a lighter-weight, all-terrain capable MRAP variant to address the poor roads and difficult terrain of Afghanistan. Source selection activity considered responses from more than 20 companies to a Request for Information (RFI)/market survey dated 21 August 2008 and in mid-November 2008 the U.S. government issued a pre-solicitation for an M-ATV. In early December 2008 the M-ATV formal Request for Proposals (RFP) was issued. The original M-ATV program requirement was for between 372 and 10,000 vehicles, with the most probable production quantity stated as 2,080.

In March 2009, it became known that two each of six different vehicle types (from five manufacturers) had been delivered to the U.S. Army for two months of evaluation, at the conclusion of which up to five ID/IQ (Indefinite Delivery/Indefinite Quantity) contracts would be awarded. In addition to Oshkosh's proposal, BAE Systems submitted two proposals: a Joint Light Tactical Vehicle (JLTV) derived design and an FMTV-based Caiman derivative. Force Dynamics (a Force Protection/General Dynamics Land Systems (GDLS) joint venture) offered the Cheetah, GDLS-C (Canada) offered an RG-31 MRAP derivative, and Navistar offered an MXT-based solution.

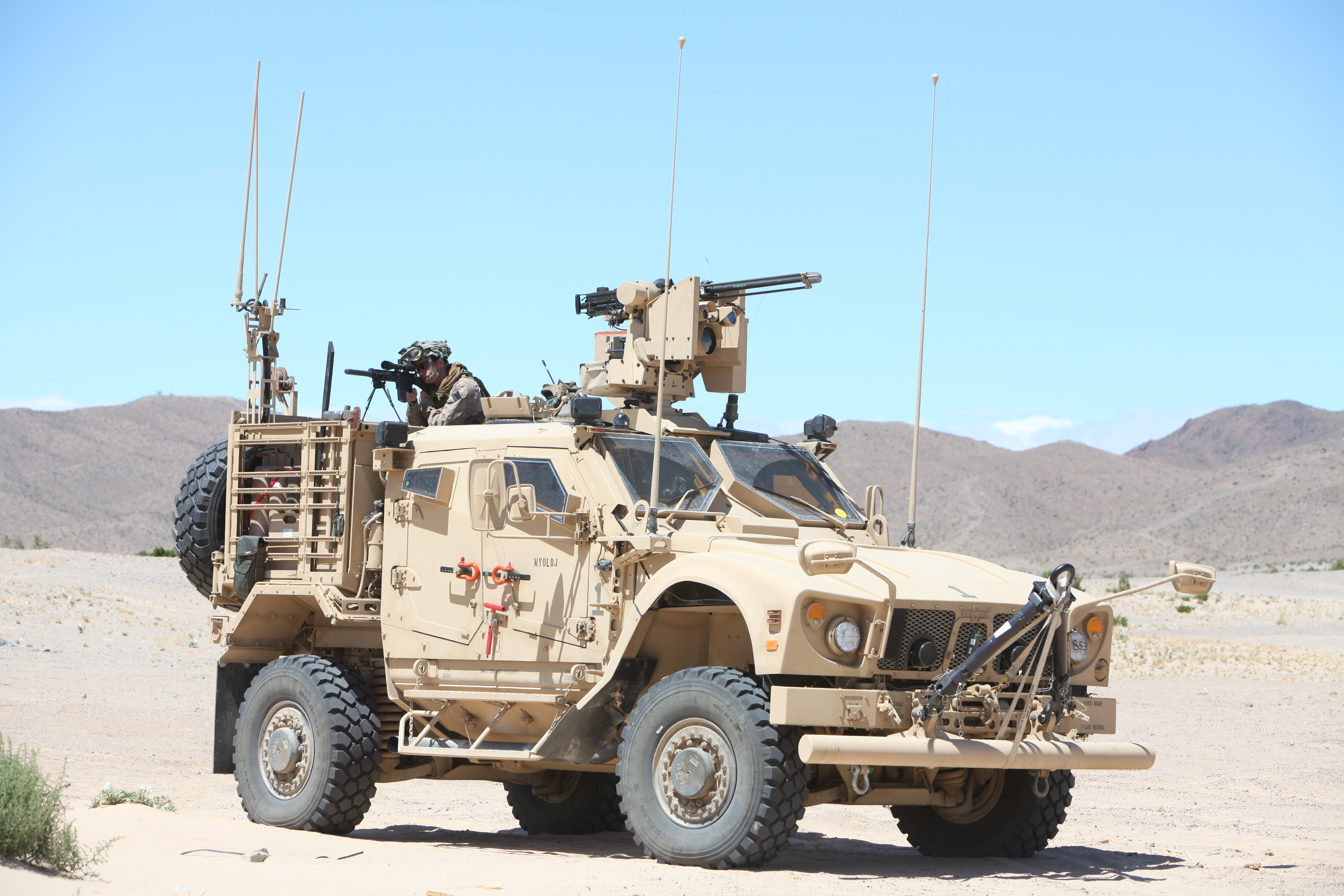
A Marine sniper with U.S. Marine Corps Forces, Special Operations Command, provides security from the back of an M-ATV during a medical engagement as part of a pre-deployment exercise

After GDLS-C's RG-31 was eliminated from the competition in May 2009, it was announced that the five remaining bidders had been awarded ID/IQ contracts, and were each to deliver three production-ready test vehicles for the next stage of the competition. At the completion of testing, the U.S. DoD stated that it planned to select a single M-ATV producer but could, at its discretion, place production orders with multiple producers as it had done with the initial MRAP procurement. On 30 June 2009, the M-ATV contract award was announced with a single ID/IQ contract award to Oshkosh. Brigadier General Michael Brogan, United States Marine Corps program officer for MRAP, stated that the Oshkosh M-ATV was chosen because it had the best survivability and Oshkosh had the best technical and manufacturing capabilities of all the competitors. The Oshkosh bid was also the second cheapest.

The initial M-ATV delivery order was valued at over $1 billion and included 2,244 M-ATVs. The overall M-ATV requirement had increased in early June from 2,080 to 5,244 M-ATVs, these split 2,598 (Army), 1,565 (Marines), 643 (U.S. Special Operations Command), 280 (Air Force), 65 (Navy), and 93 for testing.

=== Production and refurbishment ===
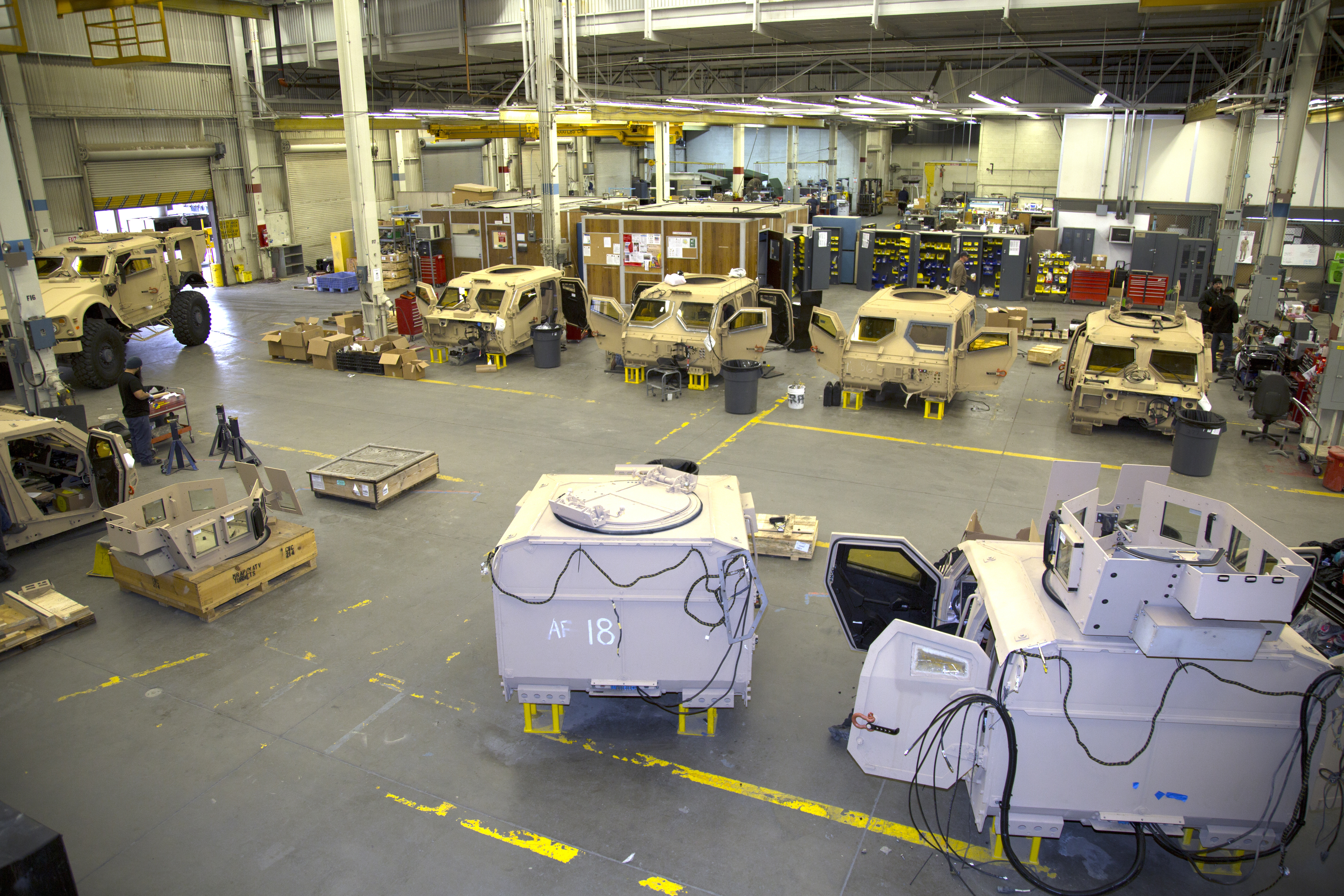
M-ATV components being refurbished, 2017

In July 2009, the first 46 M-ATVs were delivered, and in November the 1,000th M-ATV was handed over. Oshkosh reached its contractual obligation to produce 1,000 M-ATVs per month ahead of schedule in December 2009, and by using its existing manufacturing facilities in Oshkosh, WI (50%), and making use of its recession-hit JLG telescopic handler facility in McConnellsburg, PA (50%). The first vehicles arrived in Afghanistan in October 2009 and were to be all delivered by March 2010.

In total 8,722 M-ATVs were delivered to the U.S. Army, U.S. Marine Corps, U.S. Air Force, and U.S. Special Operations Command (SOCOM). M-ATVs were delivered in two main variants. The base model is designated M1240 with the Objective Gunner Protection Kit [OGPK] manned turret; it is designated M1240A1 when fitted with the Underbody Improvement Kit (UIK). The second main variant is designated M1277 and is fitted with M153 CROWS remote-controlled weapon station (RCWS). Produced in smaller numbers, the SOCOM-specific variant is designated M1245; M1245A1 with UIK fitted.

As part of the overall divestiture of the MRAP fleet, the U.S. Government will keep about 80% (around 7,000) of the M-ATV fleet, 5,651 of these (inc. 250 for SOCOM) to be retained by the Army. Work is currently underway at Oshkosh's Wisconsin facility and the Red River Army Depot to reset the around 7,000 M-ATVs retained to a common build standard. Oshkosh was awarded an initial 500-vehicle M-ATV Reset contract in August 2014. Three additional contract options for 100 vehicles each were awarded in December 2014. Total contract value is in excess of US$77 million. Deliveries were scheduled to continue through September 2015.

Reset work centers on returning vehicles to Low Rate Initial Production (LRIP) 22 standard: essentially the build standard for the final M-ATV production batch. LRIP 22 includes upgrades such as the UIK and enhanced Automatic Fire Extinguishing System (AFES). Reset work also adds Engineering Change Proposals (ECPs) that include acoustic signature reduction (muffler), Modular Ammunition Restraint System (MARS) ammunition storage, and some Government Furnished Equipment (GFE) relocation.

On 28 May 2015, Oshkosh announced the U.S. Army had awarded it a contract modification for the reset of 360 additional M-ATVs. The modification includes options for the reset of up to 1,440 additional M-ATVs. Deliveries for this latest modification started October 2015. Oshkosh is on contract to reset a combined 1,160 M-ATVs with a total value of over $115 million.

In January 2017, the US Marine Corps disclosed that they would upgrade and refurbish around 80 M-ATVs over a five-month period, the work scheduled to take three to four weeks for each M-ATV and cost around $385,000 per vehicle, with both Marine and Air Force M-ATVs involved. The main difference between the two services M-ATVs is the armament; Air Force M-ATVs are fitted with a CROWS (Common Remotely Operated Weapon Station), while Marine M-ATVs are fitted with a manual OGPK (Objective Gunner Protection Kit) turret.

=== Developments ===
At the Association for Unmanned Vehicle Systems International (AUVSI) 2013 convention, Oshkosh announced the integration of the TerraMax system onto the M-ATV to allow the type to be converted into an unmanned ground vehicle. The goal is to use the M-ATV as an unmanned platform for route clearance and counter improvised explosive device (IED) missions by engineers.

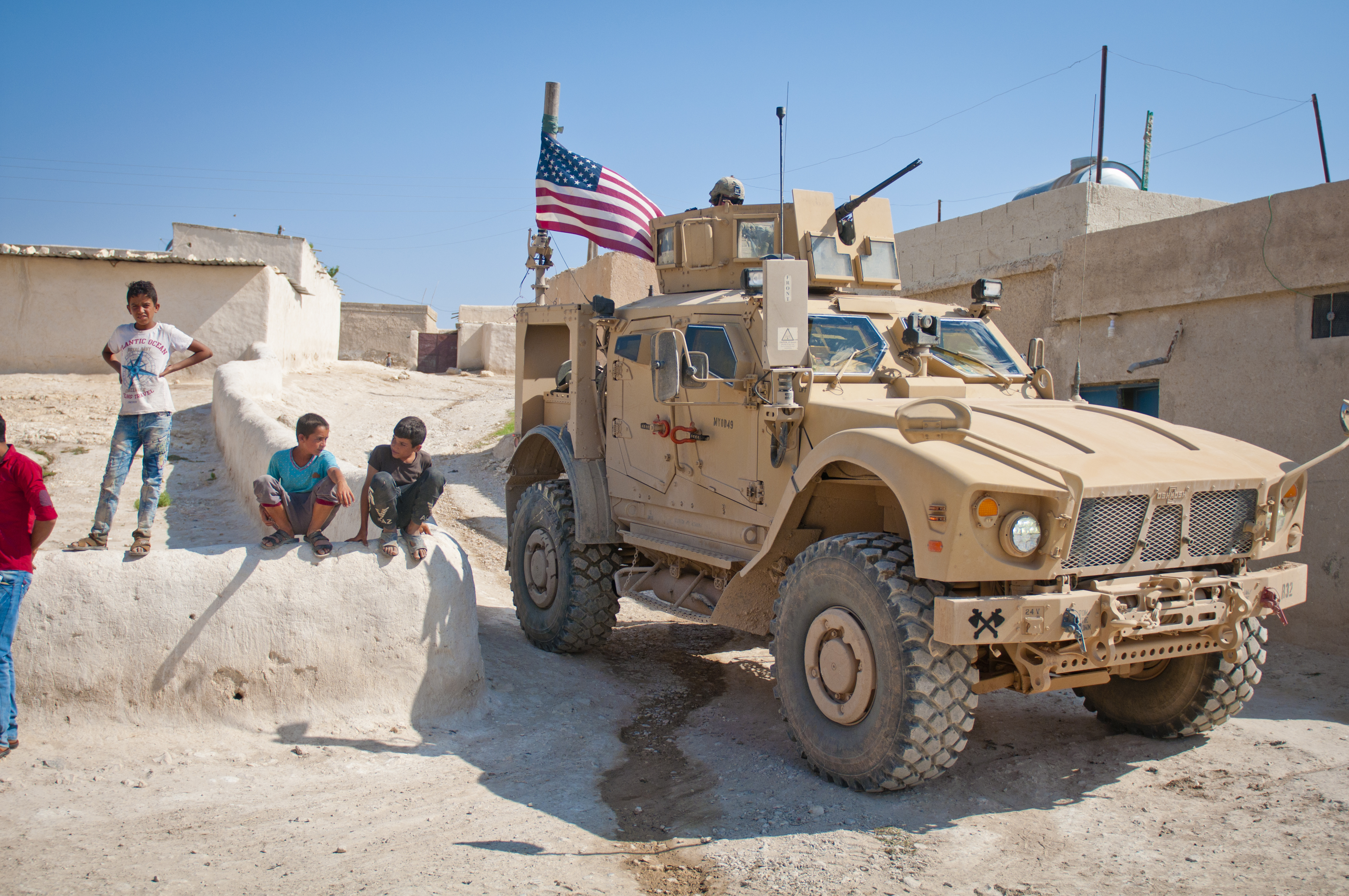
An M-ATV used by U.S. troops near Manbij, Syria, July 2018

In February 2015, Oshkosh Defense unveiled the M-ATV Extended Wheel Base Medical (EXM) variant at the International Defense Exhibition (IDEX) in Abu Dhabi, United Arab Emirates. This variant of the M-ATV has enough interior capacity to simultaneously transport two litter-bound patients, two ambulatory patients, a medic, commander and driver. The M-ATV EXM's customizable internal configuration also enables equipment to be accessed quickly by a centrally positioned medic.

In February 2015, Oshkosh Defense and Alliant Techsystems conducted a firing demonstration of the M230LF 30 mm chain gun on an M-ATV to demonstrate the viability and effectiveness of a medium caliber weapon system for light tactical vehicles. The live fire demonstration showcased improved accuracy in mobile engagements and improved lethality on the M-ATV using the gun, mounted on the R400S-Mk2, a 3-axis stabilized remote weapon station weighing less than 400 kg (880 lb). The addition of the 72.6 kg (160 lb) M230LF stabilized on the RWS provides mobile precise lethality, usually reserved for heavier combat vehicles, with exceptional off-road mobility and MRAP levels of protection.

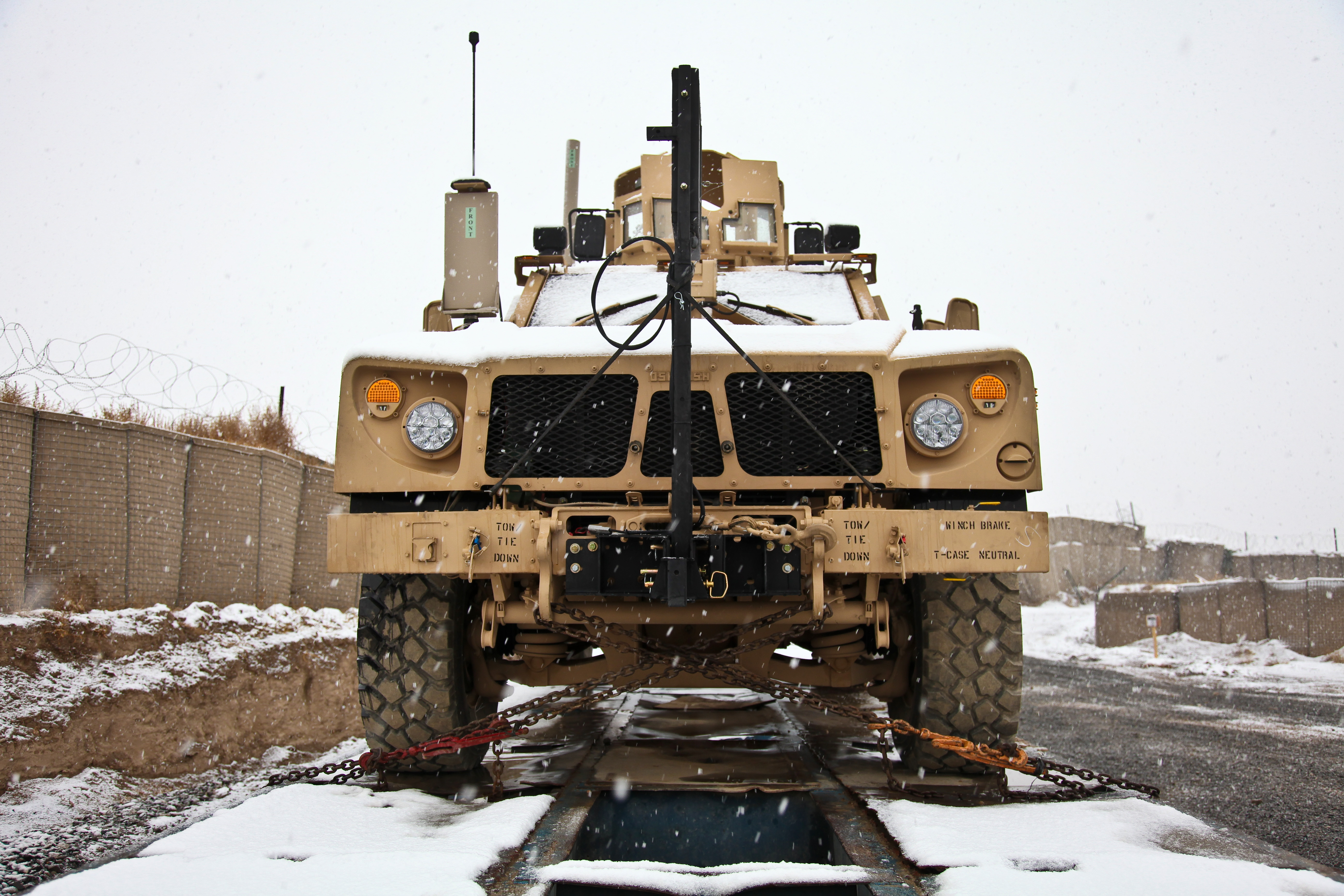
An M-ATV being delivered to the U.S. Forward Operating Base Airborne in Wardak, Afghanistan

The M-ATV proved to be more survivable than the Humvee and was lighter than other MRAP versions, but to further enhance survivability and mobility for troops, the U.S. military undertook the Joint Light Tactical Vehicle (JLTV) program to obtain a vehicle combining light weight, mobility, and protection. In August 2015, Oshkosh was awarded the contract for their Light Combat Tactical All-Terrain Vehicle (L-ATV), which took design lessons from fielding the M-ATV and incorporated them into a truck at two-thirds the weight and with faster off-road speeds.

By 2018, the Marine Corps was deploying a Counter-Unmanned Aerial System (C-UAS) that can be mounted onto an M-ATV. The Ground-Based Air Defense (GBAD) Counter-UAS system consists of the RPS-42 S-band radar, the Modi electronic warfare system, visual sensors and Raytheon Coyote anti-drone UAV to detect, track and destroy hostile drones.

== Design ==
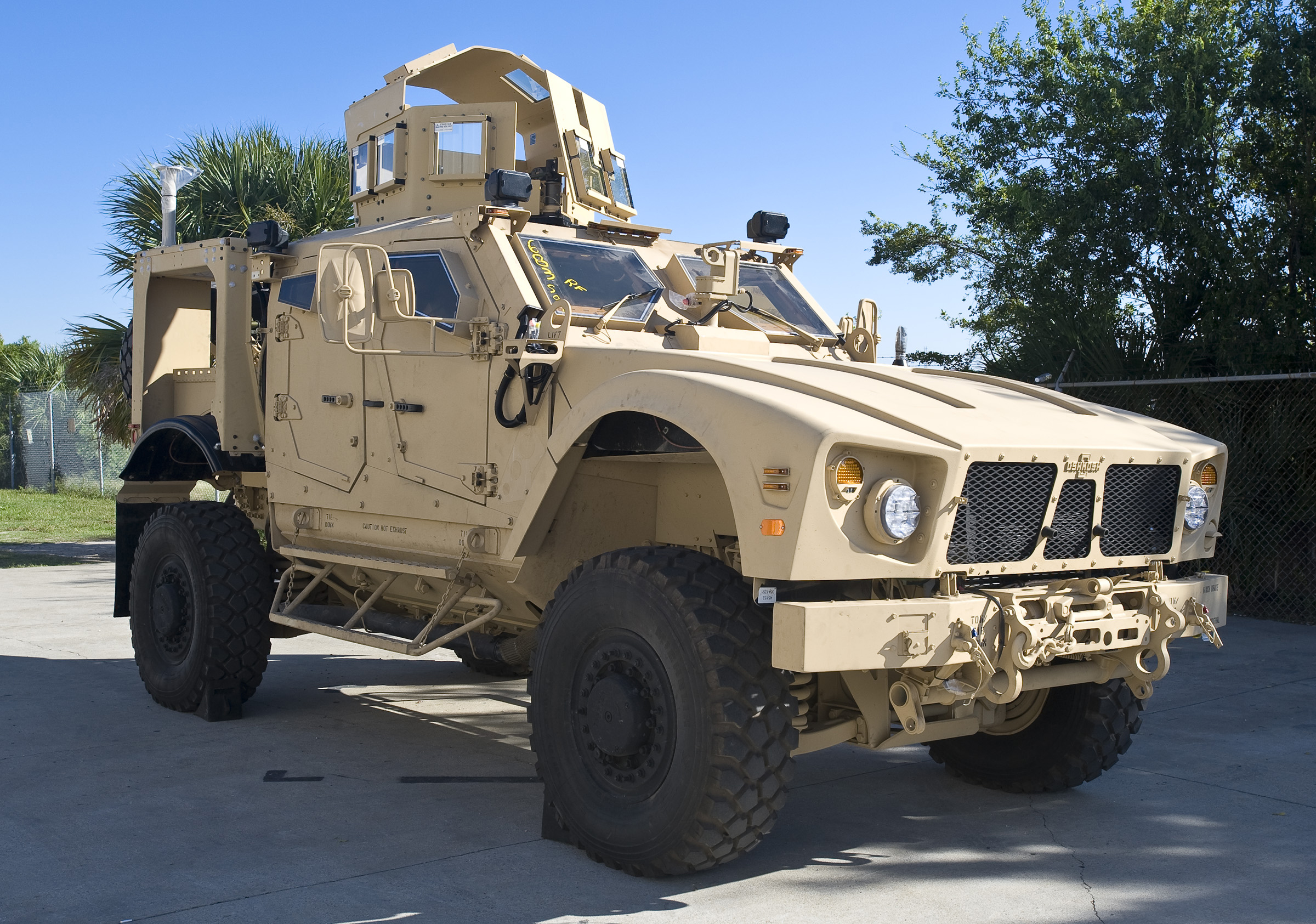
An early model M-ATV in September 2009, equipped with a manned turret

The M-ATV combines a Plasan designed armored hull developed for the Northrop Grumman/Oshkosh JLTV Technology Development (TD) phase proposal with some elements of the Medium Tactical Vehicle Replacement (MTVR) chassis and Oshkosh's TAK-4 suspension system. TAK-4 suspension is coil sprung and fully independent, and offers 16 inches of wheel travel.

For survivability, and in addition to the V-shaped hull which is optimized for IED protection, other aids include the ability to take a 7.62 mm round to the engine oil/coolant/hydraulic system and continue to drive for at least one kilometer. The engine compartment is also protected with the Stat-X engine fire suppression system. A central tire inflation system (CTIS) and run-flat inserts allow the M-ATV to travel at least 30 miles at 30 mph even if two tires lose pressure. The M-ATV also features a traction control system and anti-lock brakes.

Armament is roof-mounted and can be either manually with gun shield or remotely operated. Manual options include a M240 machine gun, a Mk 19 grenade launcher, an M2 Browning machine gun, a MILAN anti-tank guided missile, or a BGM-71 TOW anti-tank guided missile launcher. Remote option is usually the CROWS (Common Remotely Operated Weapon Station), however as previously mentioned, Oshkosh has also fitted for demonstration purposes the R400S-Mk2, a 3-axis stabilized remote weapon station when has the M230LF chain autocannon mounted on.

Other M-ATV features include a HVAC system and power outlets for charging portable electronic devices. The M-ATV is also unique among MRAP-type designs in that it uses suicide-type rear doors.

== Exports ==
The United Arab Emirates Army initially ordered 55 M-ATVs through an FMS sale in 2011. The UAE ordered another 750 M-ATVs direct from Oshkosh in July 2012. These are to provide greater off-road mobility and crew protection for regional security and peace-keeping operations; users include the elite Presidential Guard. Deliveries were completed in August 2013. In September 2014, the UAE requested another 44 M-ATVs from U.S. surplus stocks.

In September 2013, the Saudi Arabian Army began negotiations for an order for an undisclosed number of M-ATVs. Saudi Arabia received an estimated 450 M-ATVs including some extended wheelbase variants.

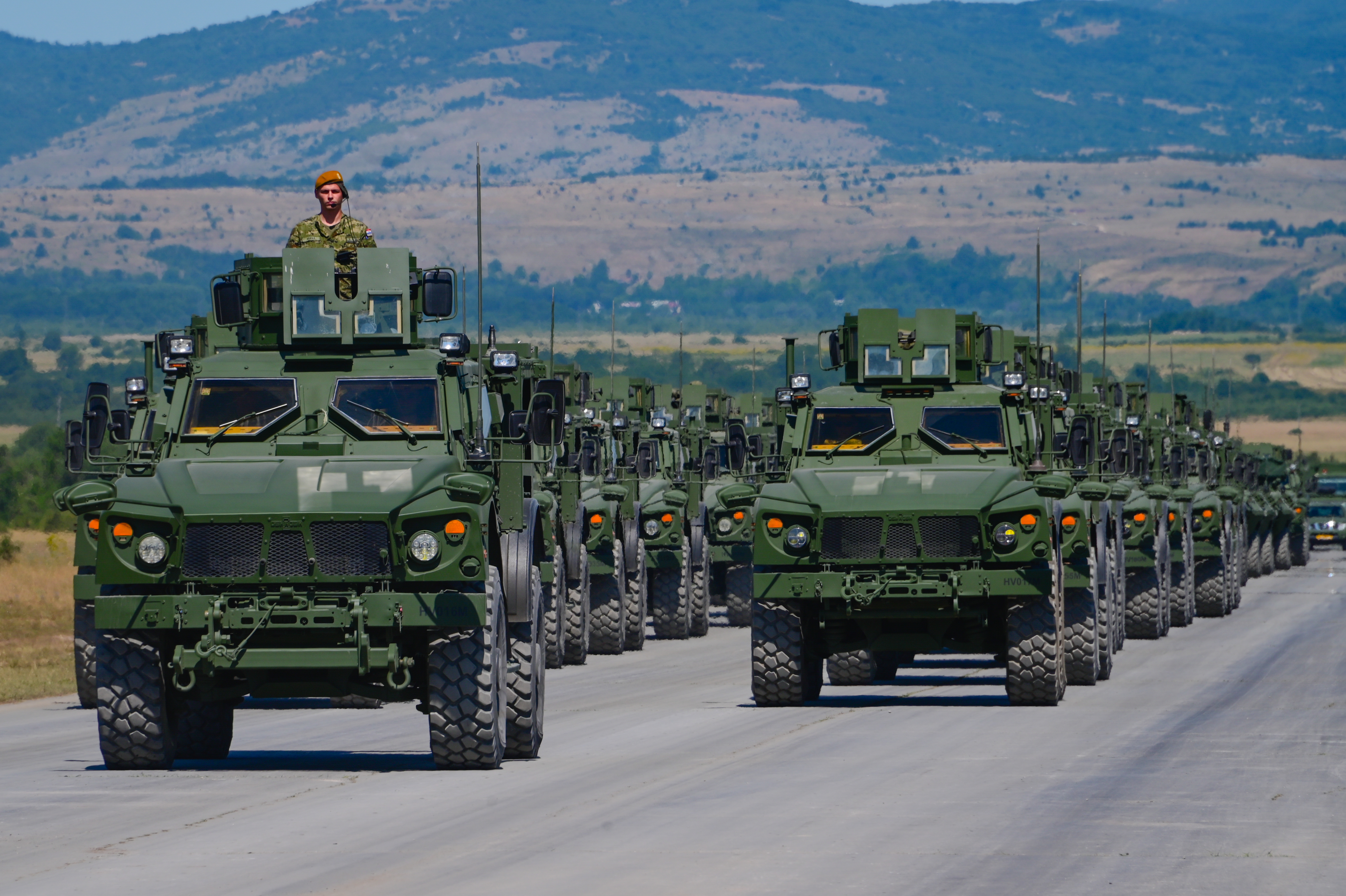
Croatian Army M-ATV

On 7 April 2014, the U.S. government donated 162 M-ATVs to the Croatian Army for use in small-scale combat operations in urban and restricted environments. Fifteen M-ATVs are going to the Croatian Special Forces Command (SFCOM), five will be with the Support Command (SCOM), two with the Military Police Regiment, and 78 entered service with the Croatian Army in 2015, with a further 62 to follow in 2016 for the 1st Battalion of the Motorized Guards Brigade in Gospic.

In January 2015, it was reported that the U.S. was to donate 308 MRAP vehicles to Uzbekistan under the Excess Defense Articles program. Requested totals include 159 M-ATVs with UIK, plus 50 Maxxpro Plus, 20 MaxxPro recovery, 50 BAE RG-33L CAT II and 70 Cougar CAT 1 (W/ISS (65); W/O ISS 5) vehicles.

In February 2015, it was disclosed that the U.S. was providing 20 M-ATVs to African Union (AU) peacekeepers in Somalia. These M-ATVs will replace older 1980s-vintage Casspir vehicles.

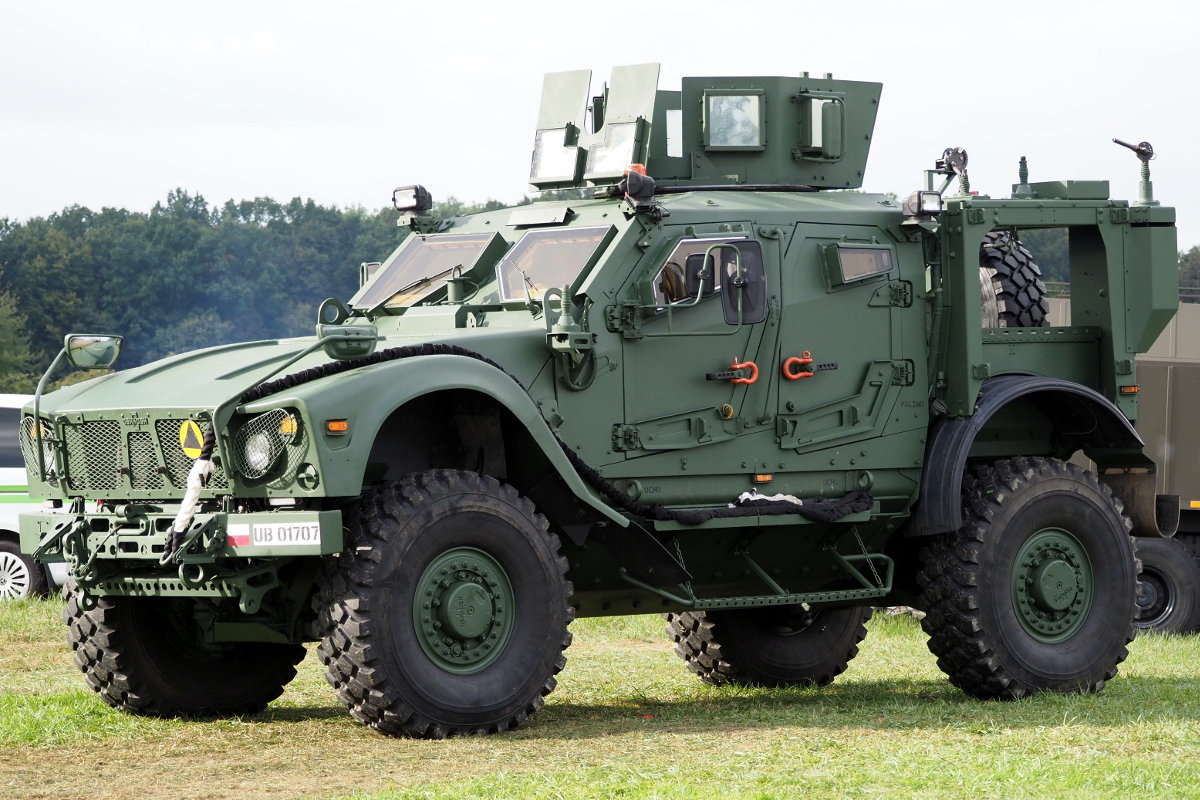
Polish Special Forces M-ATV

On 25 February 2015, Polish special forces received 45 M-ATVs. The handover ceremony took place in Kraków, Poland and the US Ambassador in Poland, Stephen D. Mull, participated in the event. Delivery of the MRAP vehicles was carried out within the framework of the Excess Defense Articles program, the standard way that the U.S. military gives surplus equipment to allies.

In June 2016, photographs released by the Iraqi Ministry of Defence showed M-ATVs with Iraqi Special Operations Forces (ISOF) (also known as the Counter-Terrorism Service (CTS)) units advancing northwards for the operation to retake the Islamic State-held city of Mosul.

== Variants ==
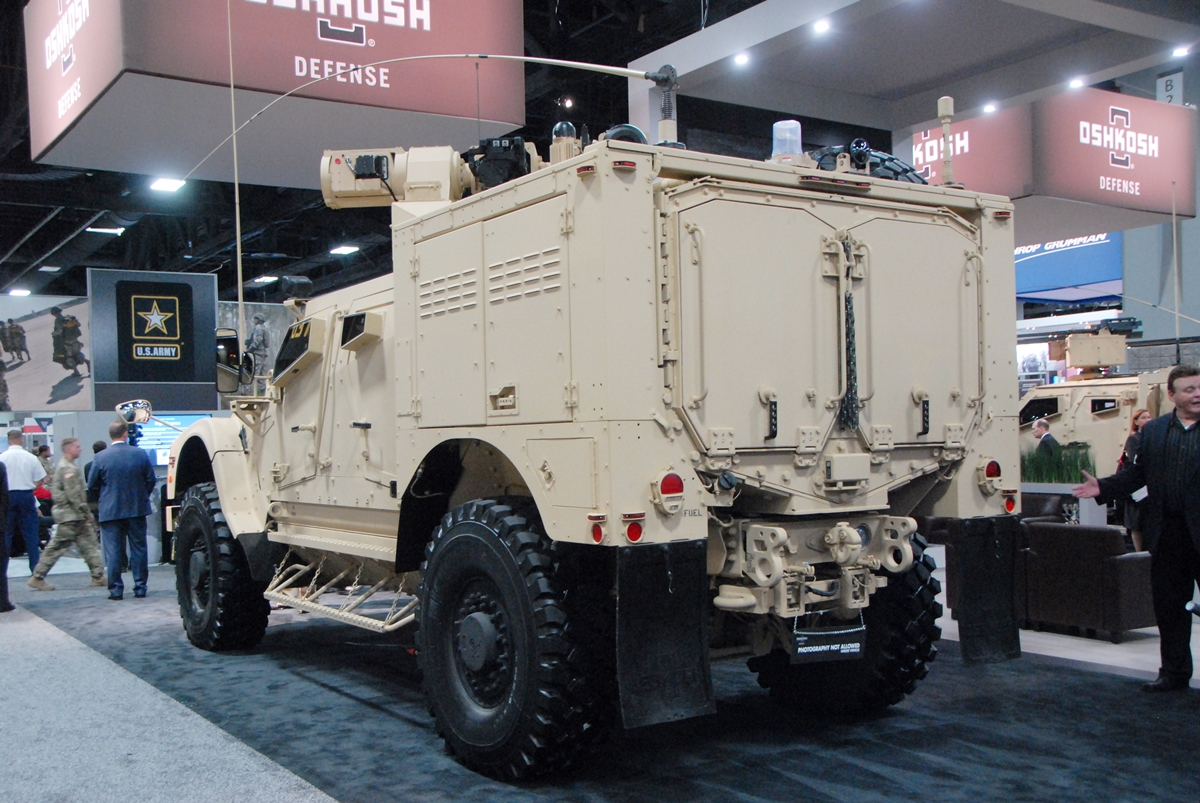
AUSA expo. in 2016 for first public showing of M-ATV in Assault configuration.

Oshkosh formally announced the addition of designated variants to the M-ATV family in April 2014. The range has evolved since then, the current five variants announced in May 2016.

The five current variants are:

- M-ATV Special Forces – 5-seat with protected cargo area. Curb Weight: 31,467 lb (14,273 kg); payload: 5,500 lb (2,495 kg).
- M-ATV Assault – modular seating for up to 11. Curb Weight: 35,450 lb (16,080 kg); payload: 4,400 lb (1,996 kg). Extended wheelbase.
- M-ATV Engineer – modular seating for 5 to 11. Curb Weight: 35,225 lb (15,978 kg); Payload: 4,400 lb (1,996 kg). Mine roller ready. Extended wheelbase.
- M-ATV Command – 5-seat. Curb Weight: 35,128 lb (15,934 kg); payload: 4,400 lb (1,996 kg). Extended wheelbase.
- M-ATV Utility – 5-seat. Curb weight w/fuel: 29,344 lb (13,310 kg); payload: 7,000 lb (3,181 kg). Flatbed platform with ISO-lock corner fixings. Extended wheelbase.

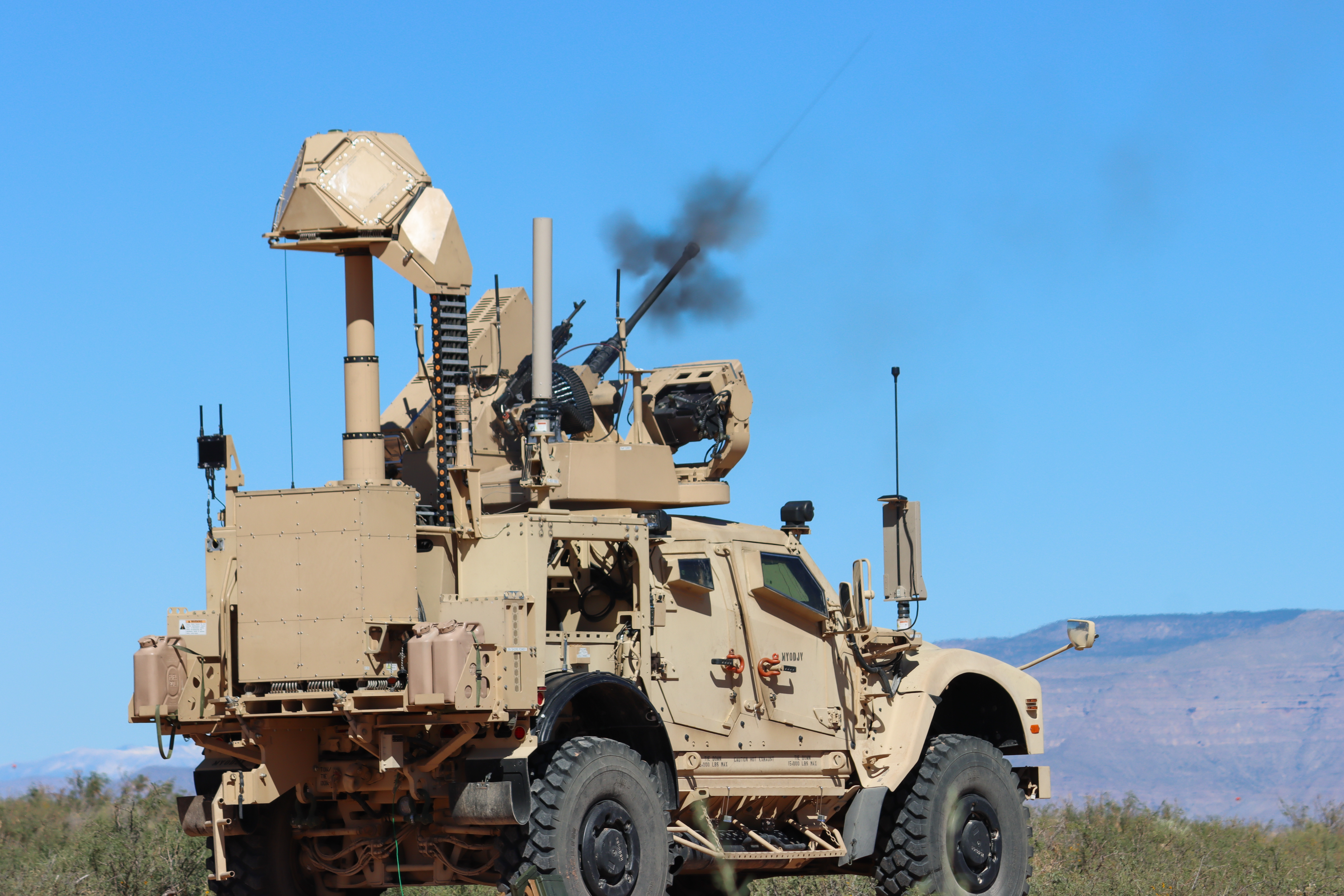
M-LIDS

- M-ATV M-LIDS – a counter-drone system developed by Leonardo DRS.
  - M230 chain gun 30mm
  - Coyote Block 2 Interceptor
  - AN/TPQ-50 KuRFS multi-mission radar
  - electro-optical infrared camera
  - direction-finding sensors
  - counter-drone electronic warfare system;
  - forward area air defence command and control (FAAD C2) with mesh-net internet protocol radios

=== 6×6 technology demonstrator ===
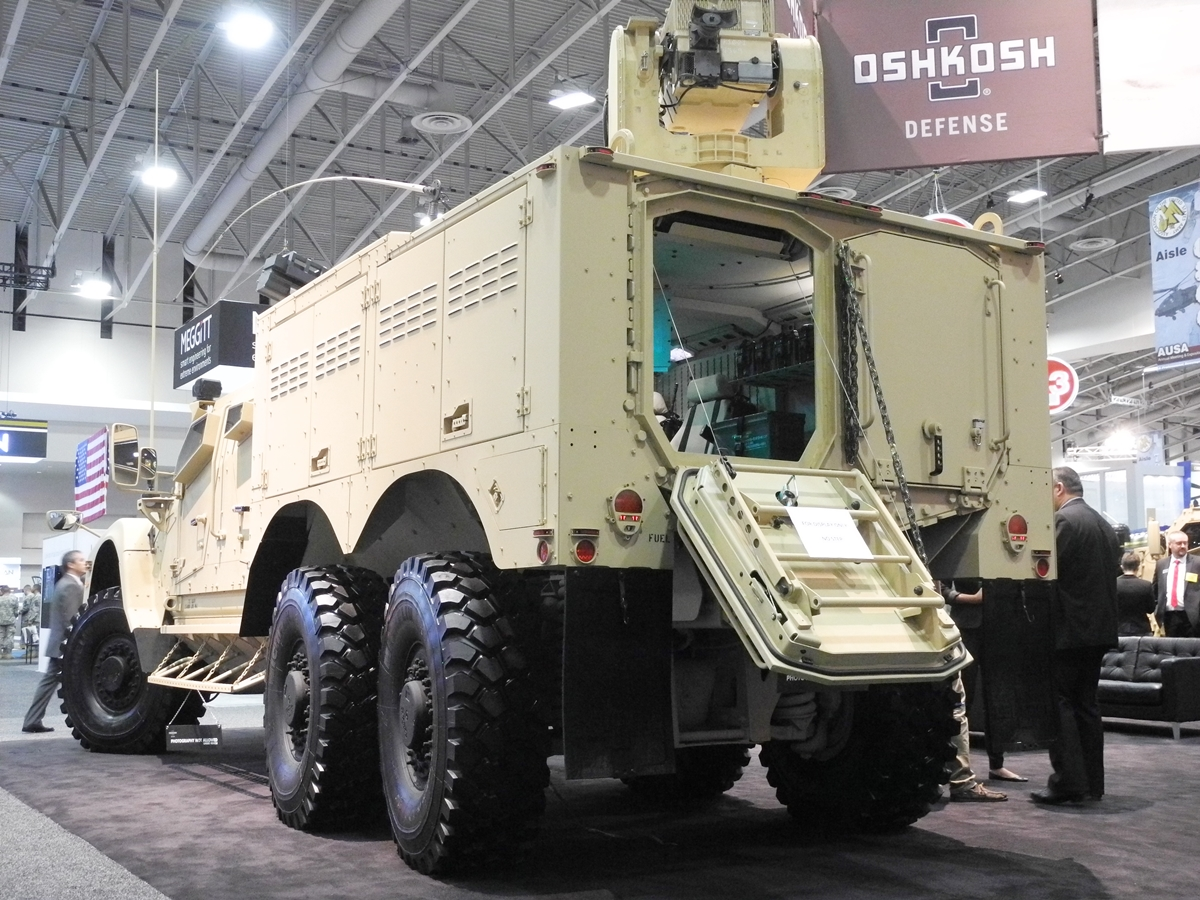
Oshkosh Defense 6×6 M-ATV at AUSA 2015

In October 2015, Oshkosh unveiled an M-ATV 6×6-wheeled technology demonstrator. The vehicle was designed with greater interior volume to transport three crew and 8–12 troops and to have greater payload capacity while maintaining MRAP-level protection and off-road mobility, combining the TAK-4 independent suspension and the M-ATV 6×6's all-wheel steer for maneuverability across any terrain. Top speed is 65 mph (105 km/h) with a 70 percent off-road/30 percent on-road suspension durability profile. It has a curb weight of 21 tons (42,000 lb or 19,000 kg), a payload capacity of 12,000 lb (5,400 kg), and the same turning radius as the 4x4 version.

== Operators ==
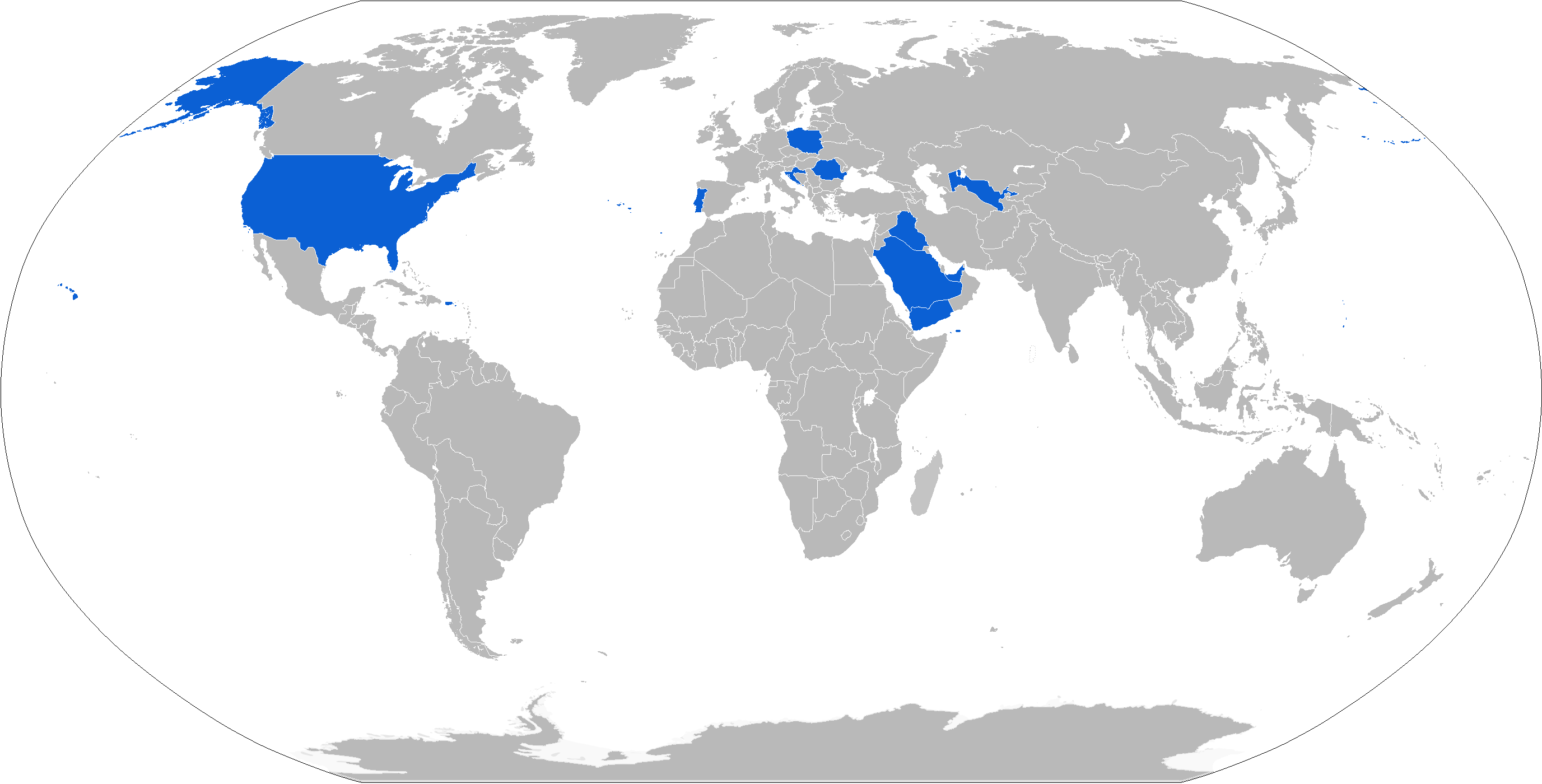
Map of M-ATV operators as of June 2016

- Bahrain
- Croatia: 147 with the Army and 15 with the Special Forces as of 2016
- Iraq
- Morocco
- Poland: 124 as of 2024
- Portugal: 22 vehicles operated in Afghanistan as of 2018.
- Saudi Arabia: 1,859 as of 2016
- United Arab Emirates: 750 as of 2016
- United States: 5,651 in the Army and 704 with the USMC as of January 2025
- Uruguay: 36 as of 2024
- Uzbekistan
- Yemen – Evidence of use by Yemeni army in current conflict. Propaganda videos show use by the Islamist political and military organization Ansar Allah.
- Ukraine: Ukraine was supplied with an unknown number of M-ATVs by the United States, sometime in early 2023 as part of ongoing efforts to support Ukraine following the Russian invasion of Ukraine. These were likely provided as part of a security package in January 2023, when 55 unnamed MRAPs were provided. As of 14 January 2025, Ukrainian forces have lost at least 28 M-ATVs during the war.

== See also ==
- M1117 armored security vehicle
- Hawkei

== Bibliography ==
- Connors, Shaun C; Foss, Christopher F (March 2009). Jane's Military Vehicles and Logistics, 2009–2010. Janes. ISBN 978-0710628947..
- Connors, Shaun C; Foss, Christopher F (25 March 2010). Jane's Military Vehicles and Logistics, 2010–2011. Janes. ISBN 978-0710629104.
- Connors, Shaun (August 2010). "B'Gosh". G3 Defence. Vol. 2, no. 4. pp. 46–49. ISSN 2043-9318..
- International Institute for Strategic Studies (February 2016). The Military Balance 2016. Vol. 116. Routlegde. ISBN 9781857438352.
- * International Institute for Strategic Studies (February 2023). The Military Balance 2023. Routledge, Chapman & Hall, Incorporated. ISBN 978-1-032-50895-5.
