= Commercial Utility Cargo Vehicle =

Commercial Utility Cargo Vehicle (CUCV)
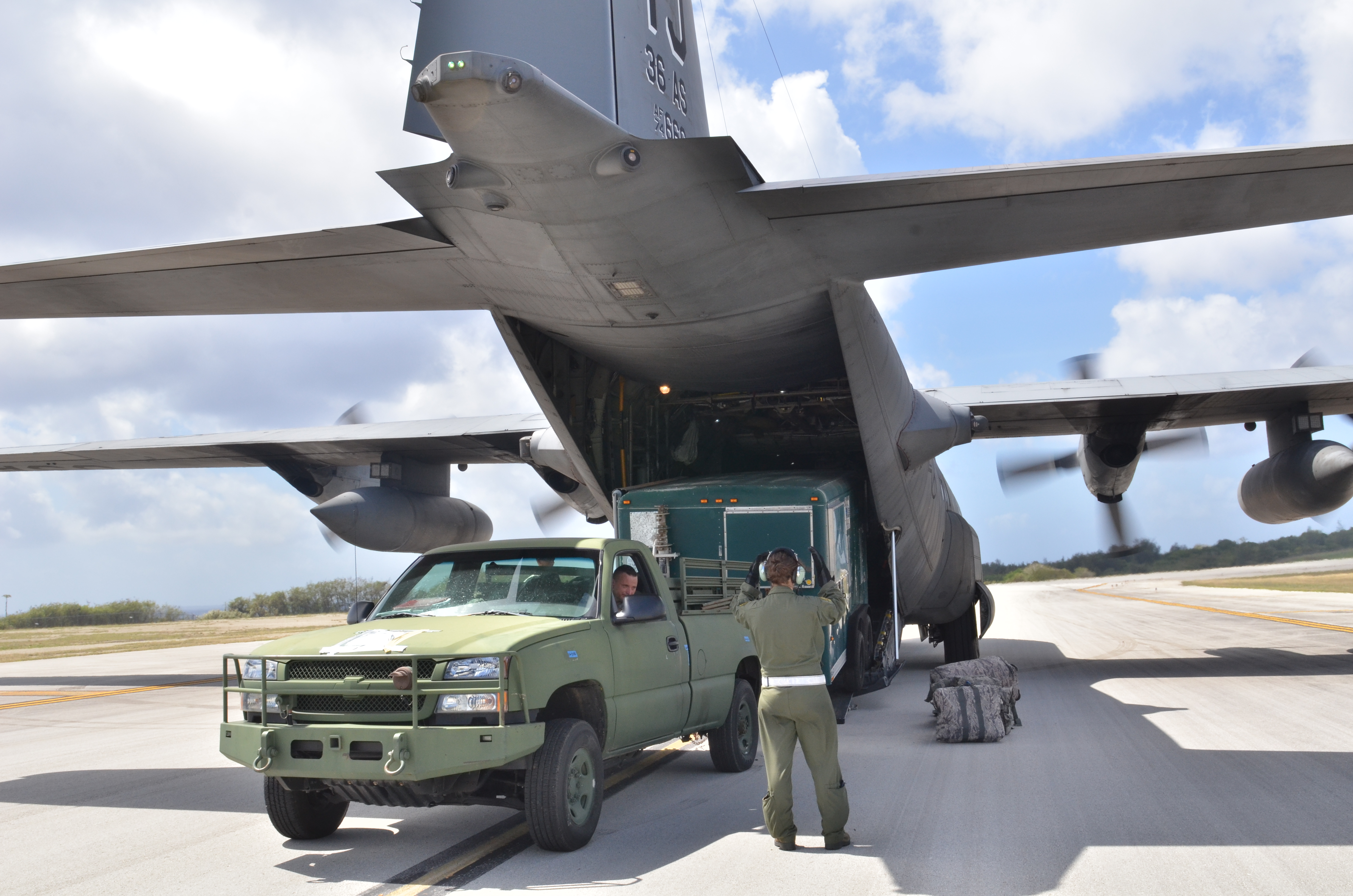
- Unloading a LSSV Silverado and trailer, Yokota Air Base, Japan

Overview
- Manufacturer: Chrysler Corp. (1976–1977); General Motors (1984–2005); AM General (2005–present)
- Production: 1976–present

The Commercial Utility Cargo Vehicle (CUCV; /ˈkʌkviː/ KUK-vee), later the Light Service Support Vehicle (LSSV), is a vehicle program instituted to provide the United States military with light utility vehicles based on a civilian truck chassis.

Some of the manufacturers that have provided vehicles to the U.S. military are Chrysler, General Motors (through their Dodge and Chevrolet divisions respectively), and AM General.

== CUCV/COTS ==
The Commercial Off The Shelf (COTS) concept, which translated into the CUCV program, was originally intended to augment the purpose-built but expensive Gama Goat 6 x 6, 1 1/4-ton trucks and M151 series 1/4-ton "jeeps" approaching the end of their service life in the mid-1970s. Initially, Dodge D series trucks were provided in the late 1970s with several military modifications. In the mid-1980s, Chevrolet C/Ks replaced the Dodge vehicles in CUCV I and CUCV II guise. GM CUCVs were heavily redesigned in 2000 and their name was changed to Light Service Support Vehicle (LSSV).

CUCVs are intended to perform "background" roles, providing support for frontline forces, such as cargo transport, troop transport, first aid, and communications. CUCVs are not built for direct frontline combat use, as evident by their lack of bulletproofing and protection from ordnance. Like many of the vehicle parts, the windshield, cabin glass, and body panels are civilian-grade and offer no protection from firearms or explosives. As a result, some CUCVs were replaced in the 1980s and 1990s by the HMMWVs they were to augment.

The U.S. military continued to keep CUCVs in active service long after their projected lifespan. CUCVs of all generations are still in U.S. service, though many M880/M890s and CUCVs have passed through military surplus sales into civilian ownership. CUCVs and LSSVs are in use as support vehicles for military police, troop transport, range control, facilities, and maintenance.

== Dodge M8XX Series ==
M880/M890
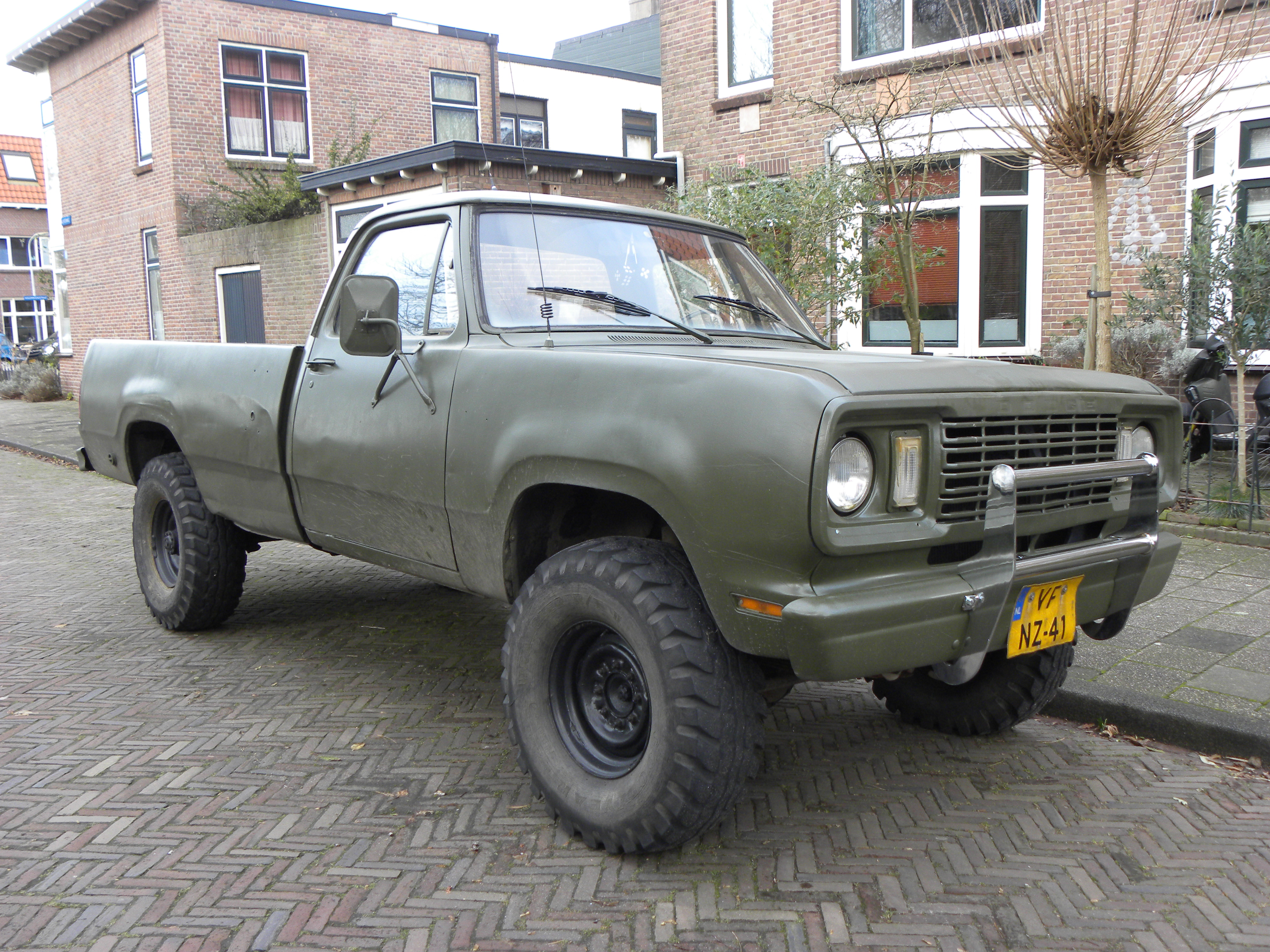

Overview
- Manufacturer: Chrysler Corporation
- Production: ~44,000 units
- Model years: 1976–1977
- Assembly: Warren Truck Assembly, Michigan, United States

Body and chassis
- Body style: 2-door pickup

Powertrain
- Engine: Chrysler 318 cubic inch engine V8
- Transmission: Torqueflite 727 3-speed automatic

Dimensions
- Wheelbase: 131 in (3.3 m)
- Length: varies by model
- Width: 79.5 in (2.02 m)
- Height: 73.85 in (1.876 m)
- Curb weight: varies by model

In 1973 Chrysler Corporation began developing militarized adaptations of their civilian Dodge trucks. In 1976 the M880/M890 series was put into production under a large contract, intended to replace previous Dodge M37 and Kaiser Jeep M715 trucks and their variants. The M880/890 trucks were adopted as part of a drive by the U.S. military to use COTS vehicles, with appropriate modifications, where such usage was feasible. An armored variant was built by Cadillac Gage as the Ranger. For almost a decade the Dodges were referred to as "880", "890", or most commonly called "five-quarters"; (the term "CUCV" did not appear until the 1980s when GM was contracted to replace the M880/890 trucks).

The 1 1/4 ton M880-series was based on the Dodge W200, a 3/4 ton capacity 4×4 civilian/commercial truck. The 880/890 had a 2,500 lb cargo rating, enabling it to have a 5/4-ton load rating. The similar 1 1/4 ton M890-series was based on the Dodge D200, a 3/4 ton capacity 4×2 civilian/commercial truck. In Canadian service, the base vehicle was the 4-speed standard transmission, Power Wagon model, which was slightly heavier and costlier than the W200.

The M880/M890 had a conventional 12-volt electrical system; a separate 24-volt system was added to certain variants of the trucks to power communications units, but this precluded power steering on those units—the pump location being taken up by the 24-volt generator. The gasoline engine was out of step with the military's move toward diesel engines during this time period. The lack of power steering was a hindrance in off-road, close quarters, and snow-plowing duties (although most civilian and Air Force models had power steering). Around 44,000 M880/M890s were produced during the 1976–1977 model years and were used by the Army and Air Force until the late 1990s.

=== Powertrain ===
All M880/M890s were powered by Chrysler's 5.2 L 318-cubic inch gasoline engine with a two-barrel Carter or Holley carburetor. These were rated at 150 hp (110 kW) and 230 lb⋅ft (310 N⋅m). Most were equipped with the TorqueFlite 727 3-speed automatic transmission. The 880s used a 2-speed New Process Gear NP203 transfer case. A Dana 44 4.10:1 front axle and floating Dana 60 4:10.1 rear axle completed the setup. The trucks were equipped with front disc brakes and rear drum brakes. They had a military-rated top speed of 70 mph (110 km/h).

=== Variants ===
- M880: Standard 4×4 pickup
- M881: M880 fitted with additional 100-amp 24-volt generator
- M882: M881 fitted with additional 60-amp 24-volt generator and communications equipment
- M883: M881 fitted with slide-in shelter kit
- M884: M880 fitted with 100-amp 24-volt generator and slide-in shelter kit with tie-downs
- M885: M880 fitted with slide-in shelter kit with tie-downs
- M886: M880 ambulance
- M887: M880 maintenance
- M888: M880 telephone maintenance
- M890: Standard 4×2 pickup
- M891: M890 fitted with additional 60-amp 24-volt generator
- M892: M890 fitted with additional 60-amp 24-volt generator and communications kit
- M893: M890 ambulance version

=== Operators ===
- Canada
- Fiji
- Israel
- Kuwait
- Lebanon
- Pakistan
- Saudi Arabia
- Taiwan
- North Yemen
- United Nations
- United States

=== Operators ===
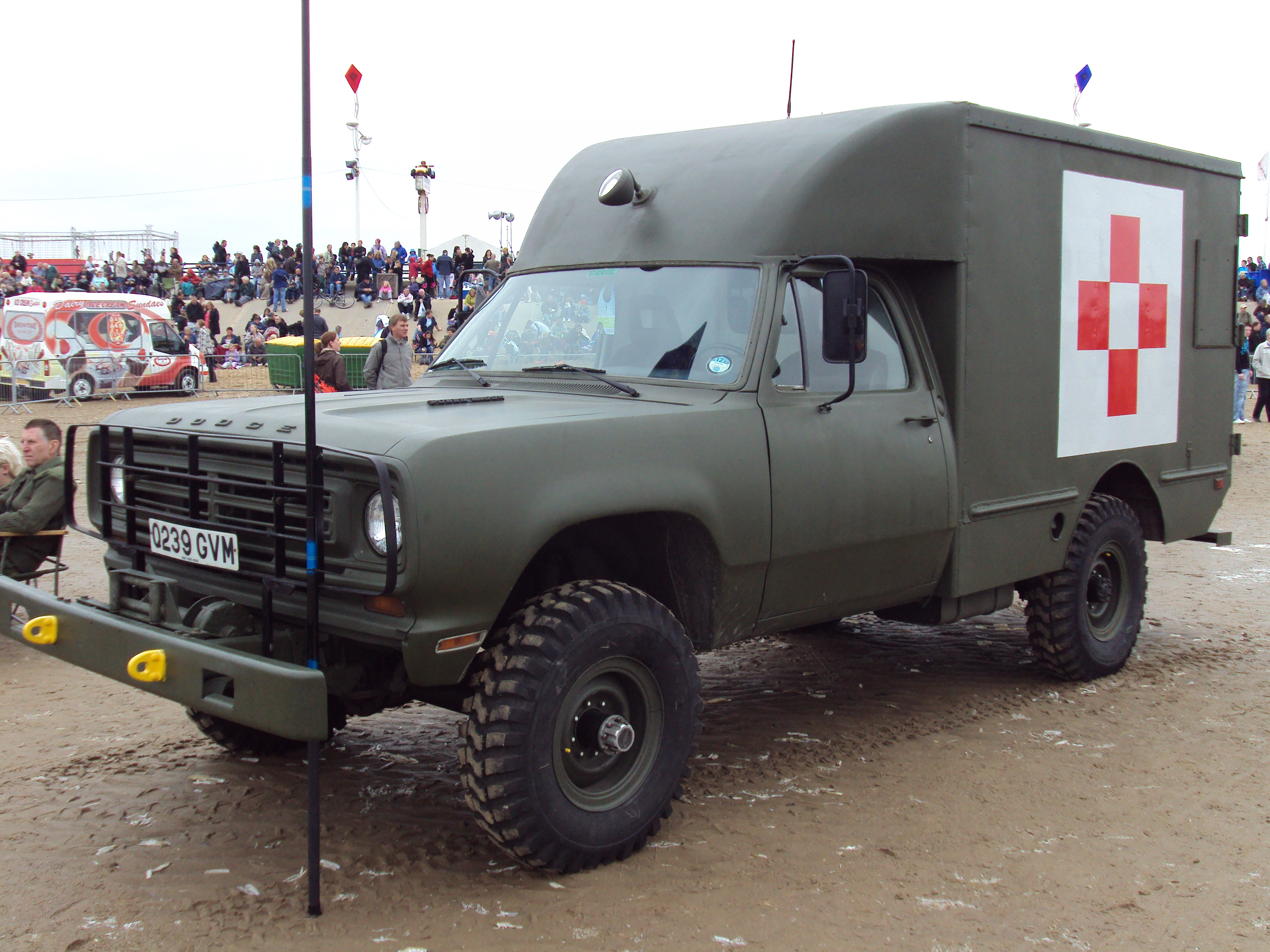
1976 M886

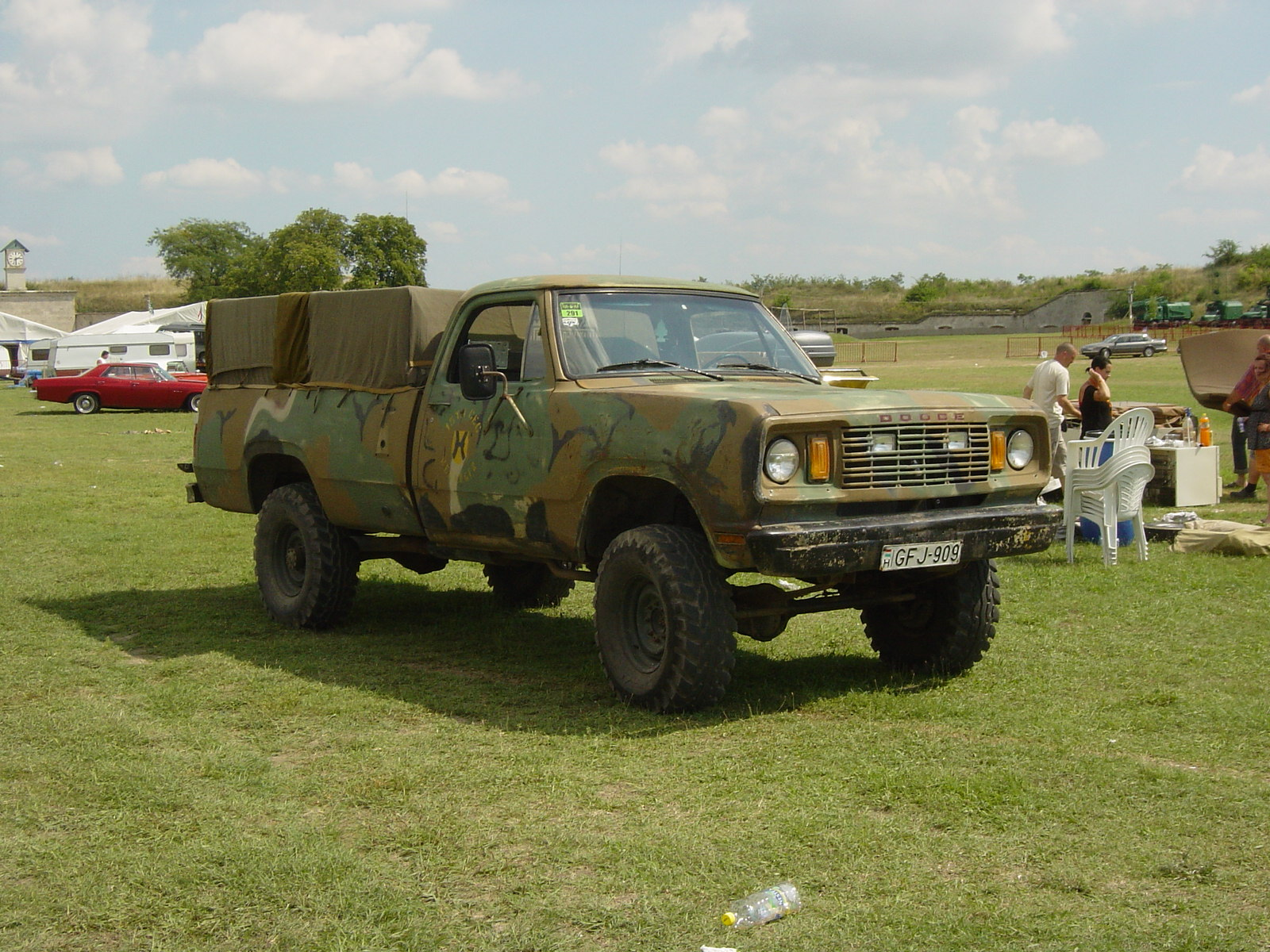
M880 variant with non-military modifications

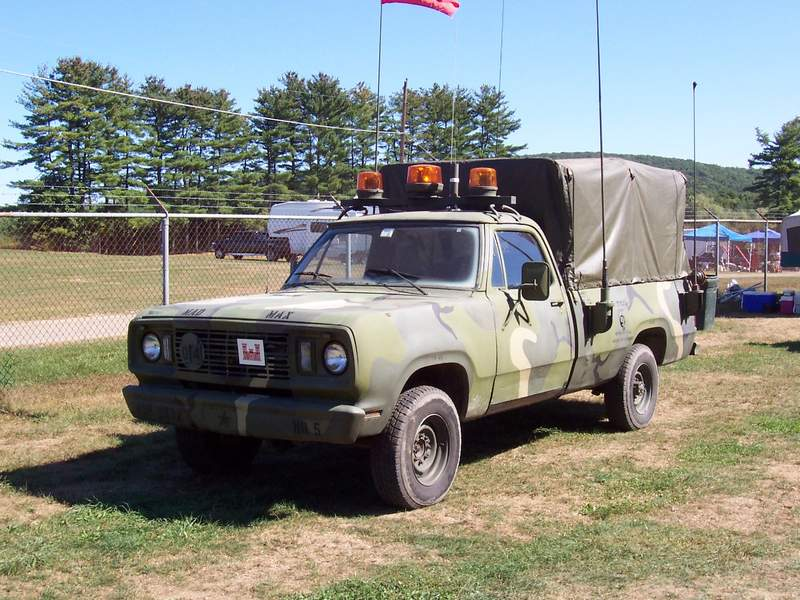
M882

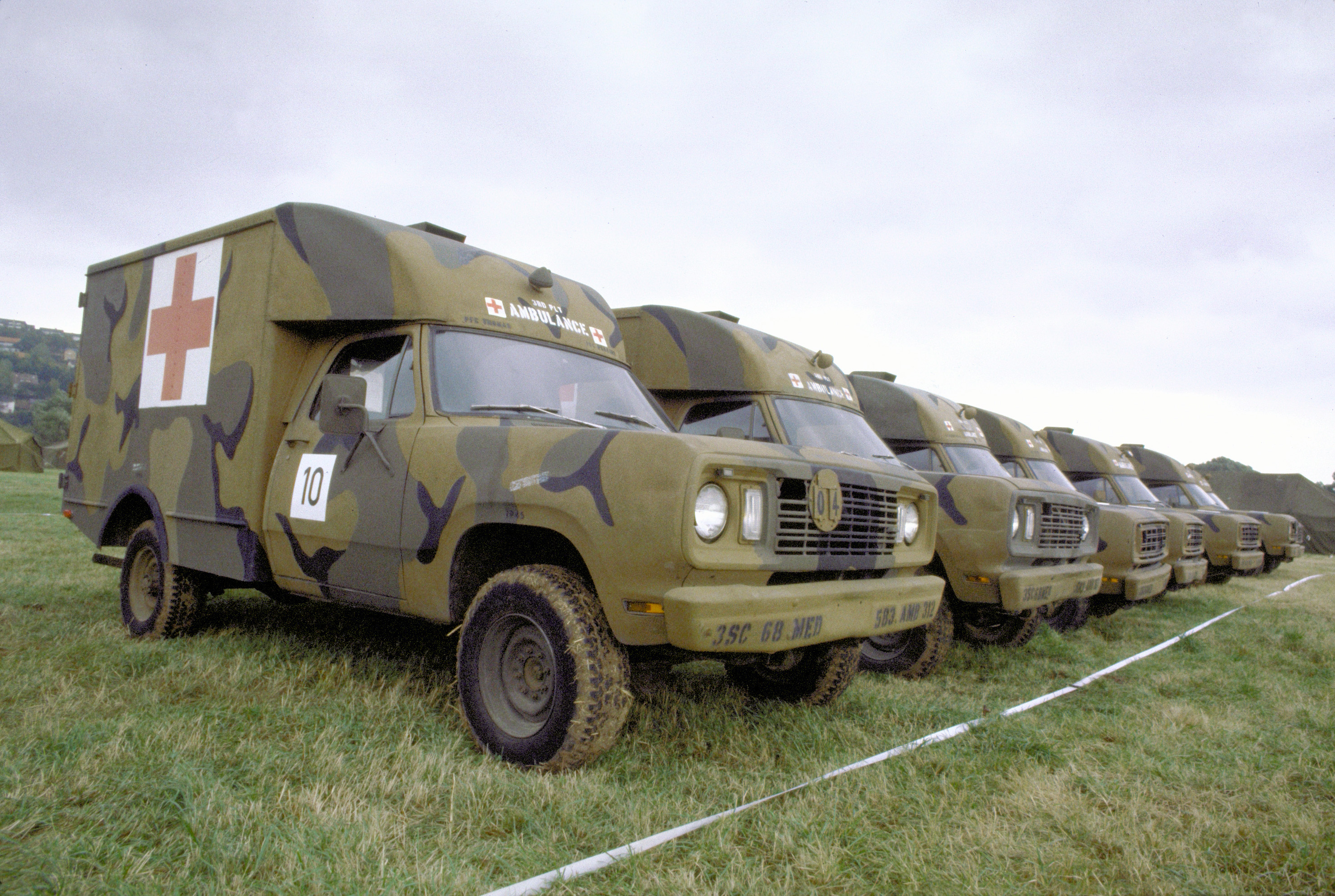
1977 M886s

== General Motors ==
General Motors and AM General have produced CUCVs since 1984 in three distinct generations: CUCV, CUCV II, and LSSV.

=== CUCV ===
CUCV
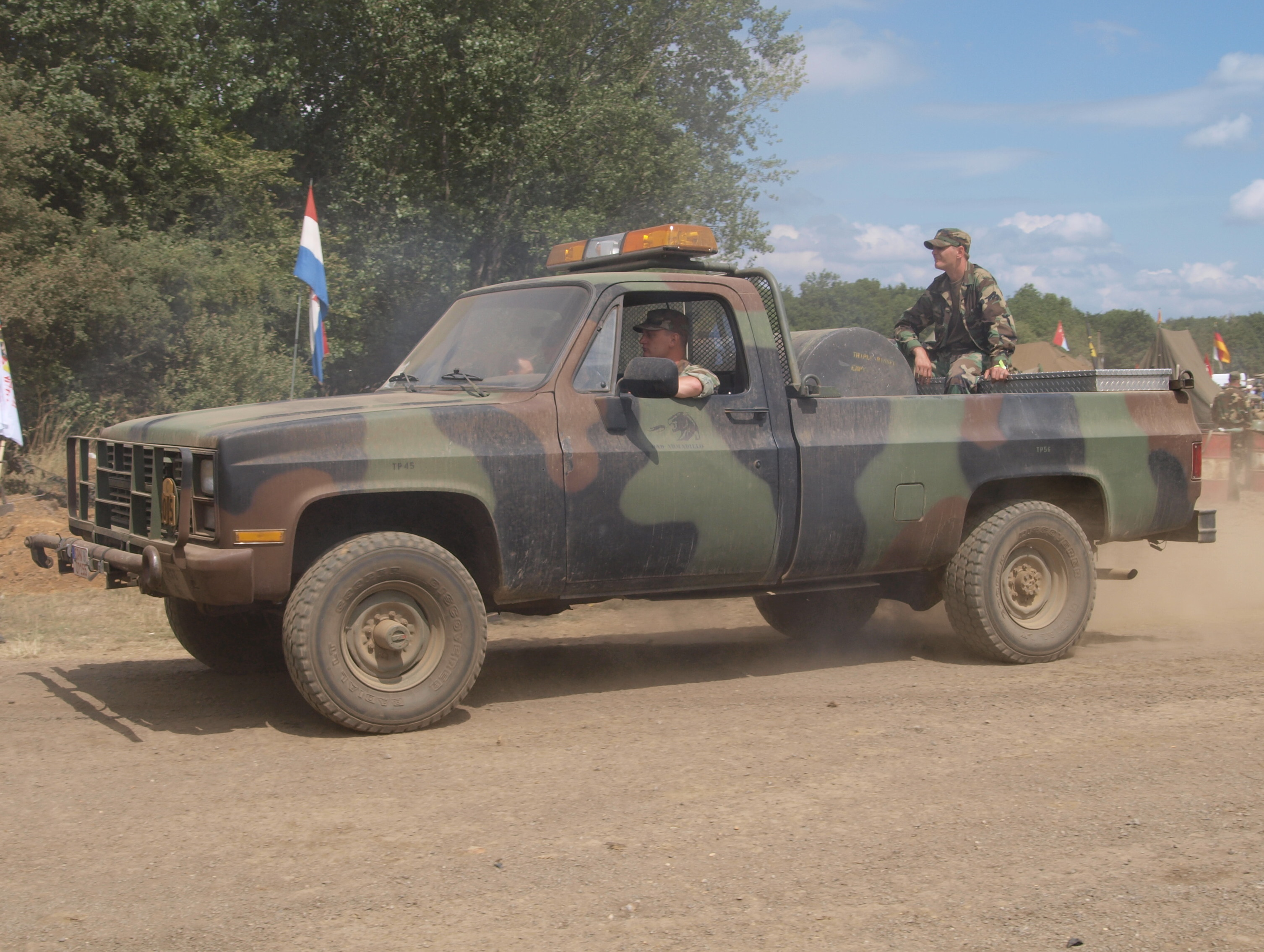

Overview
- Manufacturer: General Motors
- Model years: 1984–1987

Body and chassis
- Body style: 2-door SUV; 4-door SUV; 2-door pickup 4-door pickup

Powertrain
- Engine: 6.2 L Detroit Diesel V8
- Transmission: 3-speed TH-400 automatic

Dimensions
- Wheelbase: 131.5 in (3.34 m)
- Length: varies by model
- Width: 81.2 in (2.06 m) wider for dual rear wheel models
- Height: 75.4 in (1.92 m)
- Curb weight: varies by model

Replacing the M880/M890 series, the CUCV represented General Motors' first major light-truck military vehicle production since World War II. GM CUCVs were assembled mostly from existing heavy duty light commercial truck parts. The CUCVs came in four basic body styles: pickup, utility, ambulance body and chassis cab. The M1008 was the basic cargo truck, the M1010 was the ambulance, and the M1009 was a Chevrolet K5 Blazer uprated to 3/4-ton capacity. With the exception of the M1009, the trucks were all rated as 1 1/4 ton (commonly called a "five-quarter"), even though some of them had payloads in excess of that. There were heavier-duty variants, including the M1028, M1028A1, M1028A2 and M1028A3 shelter carriers (the shelter being a mobile command, communications or intelligence operations enclosure). The M1031 was the chassis cab. These latter trucks were all rated for heavier 3,600 lb (1,600 kg) or 3,900 lb (1,800 kg) loads, compared to the M1008s 2,900 lb (1,300 kg) load capacity. The M1028A2 (converted M1031 or m1028a1) and m1028A3 (converted M1028) models had dual rear wheels. Many M1028s were upgraded at the company level to M1028A2 and A3 specs—the dual wheel rear end arrangement was a result of the M1028 flipping on its side because of the high center of gravity when carrying equipment shelters.

GM produced some 70,000 CUCVs from 1983 to 1986 (model years were 1984–1987), though most were model year 1984. Chevrolet continued to build CUCVs in low numbers from 1986 to 1996, mainly to accommodate military markets that needed replacements for existing CUCVs.

==== Powertrain ====
All CUCV Is were powered by GM's 6.2 L J-series Detroit Diesel V8 engine non-emissions diesel. These were rated at 155 hp (116 kW) and 240 lb⋅ft (325 N⋅m), which was 5 hp (3.7 kW) more than the emissions diesel engine of the time. They were all equipped with the TH-400 automatic. All but the M1028A1 and M1031 used the NP-208 chain drive transfer case. The M1028A1 and M1031 units had a slip-yoke rear output version of the NP-205, which was specified mainly for its PTO capacity. The CUCV series had a governed top speed of 55 mph (89 km/h).

==== Axles ====
The M1009 Blazer used 10-bolt axles (front and rear) featuring 3.08:1 gears. The rear axle was equipped with an Eaton Automatic Differential Lock (ADL) while the front was a standard open differential. The M1008 trucks used open Dana 60 front axles, with the M1028 and M1031 variations often having a Trac-Lok limited slip. In the rear, the M1008s used the GM 10.5-inch (270 mm) 10.5" Corporate 14 Bolt Differential with No-Spin lockers (the commercial trade name for the Detroit Locker). Rear axles on M1028A2 and A3 duallies are Dana 70 HD. The axle gear ratios were 4.56:1.

==== Electrical ====
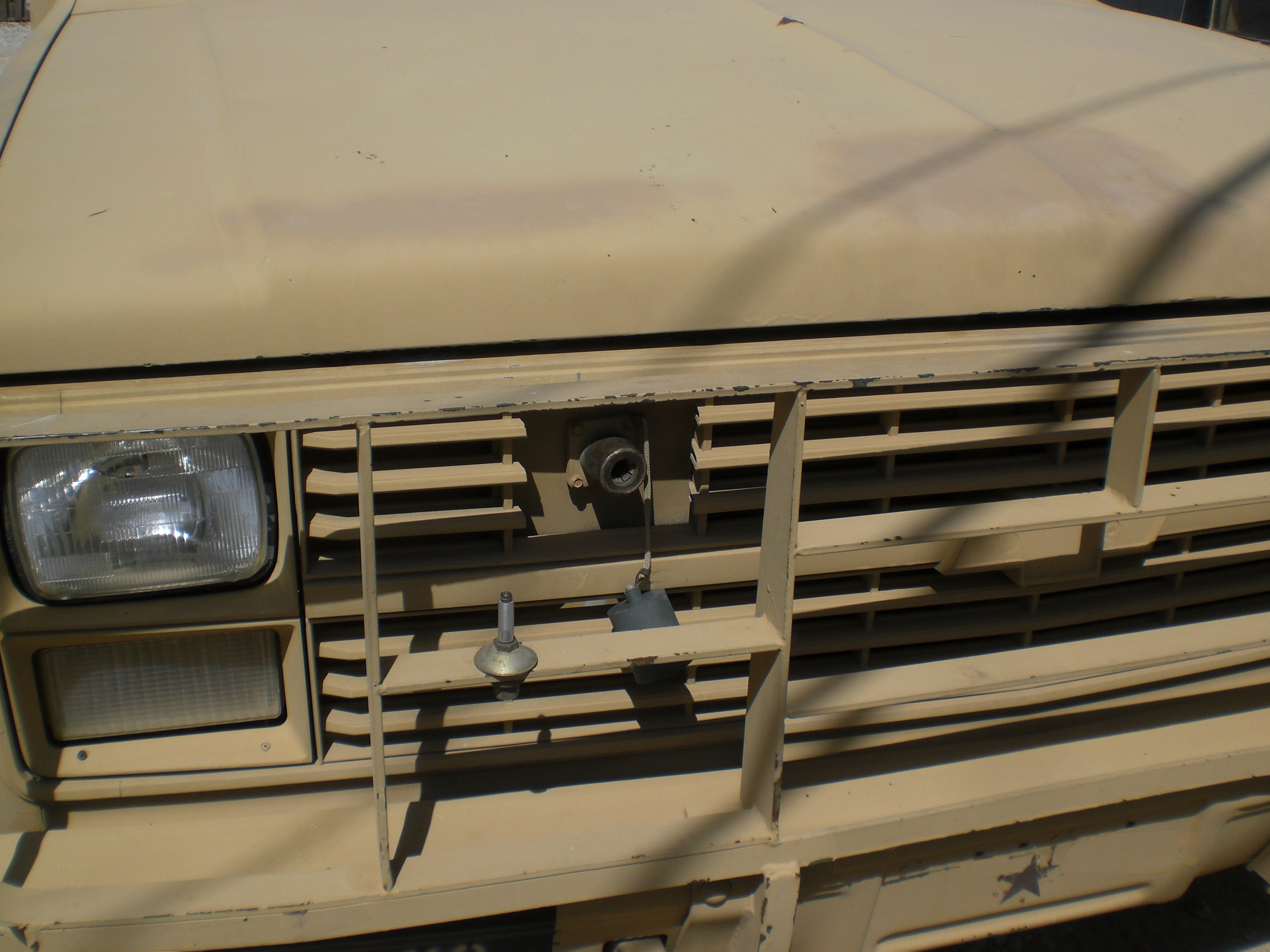
Close-up of the NATO slave receptacle on an M1009

As with other military vehicles, the CUCVs used a 24-volt electrical system.

It was actually a hybrid 12/24-volt system that used 24-volts under the hood for the starter, volt meter, diesel engine glow plug circuit along with the mandatory NATO slave receptacle for jump starting any 24 volt NATO vehicle, and hookups for military radios. The rest of the truck was 12-volt.

It was equipped with two 12 volt batteries and two 12 volt 100 amp alternators. One alternator is isolated from ground and connected in series with the other. These produce 24 volts with a 12 volt center tap much like the 240/120 volt domestic house distribution system. The 12 volts to ground were derived from the center tap.

==== Variants ====
- M1008: Basic General Motors Model K30903 except an NP208 transfer case where as the civilian model came with the NP205. The M1008 was the most numerous of the CUCV truck types. It was often seen with troop seats for eight in the bed. Fitments included a brush bar, front and rear tow hooks, and a pintle hitch. These trucks are rated to tow 3,000 lb (1,400 kg) and were often used to tow the M101 3/4-ton trailer.
- M1008A1: M1008 fitted with additional 100-amp 24-volt generator and communications kit.
- M1009: Utility version of the Chevrolet K5 Blazer. The M1009 is a utility rig built from a Blazer and could be used for command and control, as well as officer transport. Often seen with radio sets installed, however the large square tube stock mounts prevented the rear seat from being lowered. The M1009 was rated for a 1,200 lb (540 kg) payload and a 3,000 lb (1,400 kg) towed load. It used the heaviest duty GM springs available for the chassis and the rear axle was a 10-bolt unit. It rolled on 10.00-15 tires, had 3.08 gears and a rear Eaton automatic differential lock.
- M1010: Ambulance version of the M1008.
- M1010 [USMC Command]: USMC command post vehicle.
- M1010 [USMC Ordnance]: USMC ordnance repair truck.
- M1028: Shelter carrier version of the M1008.
- M1028A1: Shelter Carrier w/ PTO version of the M1008.
- M1028A2: Dual rear wheel w/ PTO version of M1028A1.
- M1028A3: Dual rear wheel w/ NP208 version of M1028A2.
- M1028FF: Fire fighting version of the GM1008.
- M1031: Chassis-cab model

==== Operators ====
- Albania
- Argentina
- Canada
- Greece
- Estonia
- Latvia
- Lebanon
- Liberia
- Lithuania
- Sudan
- United States of America

==== Gallery ====
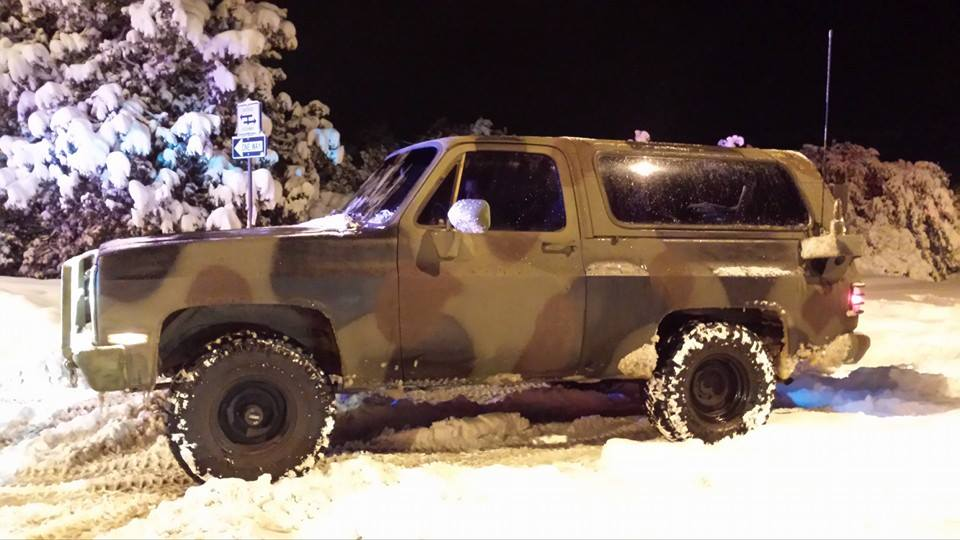
1984 M1009 CUCV in the snow

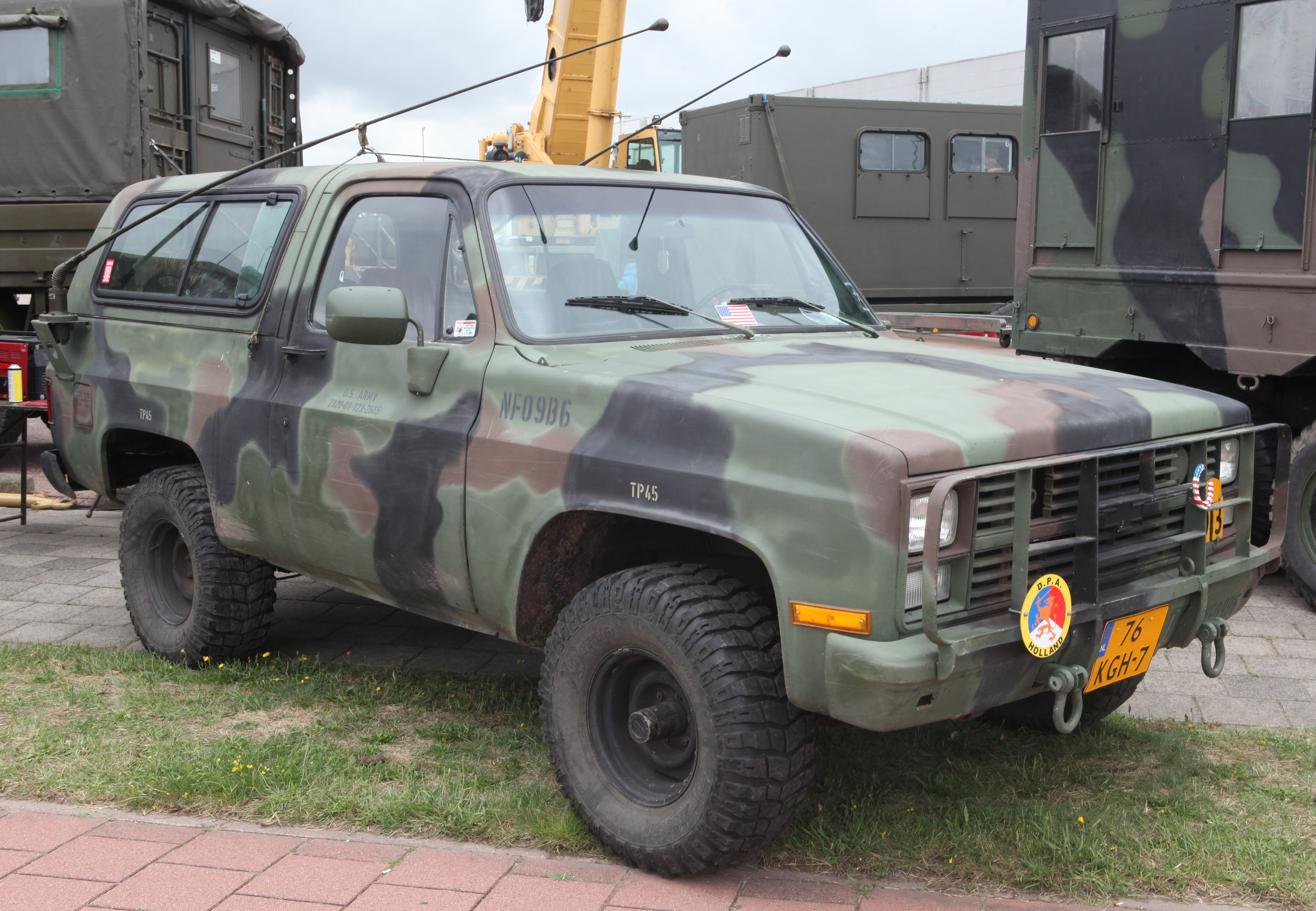
M1009

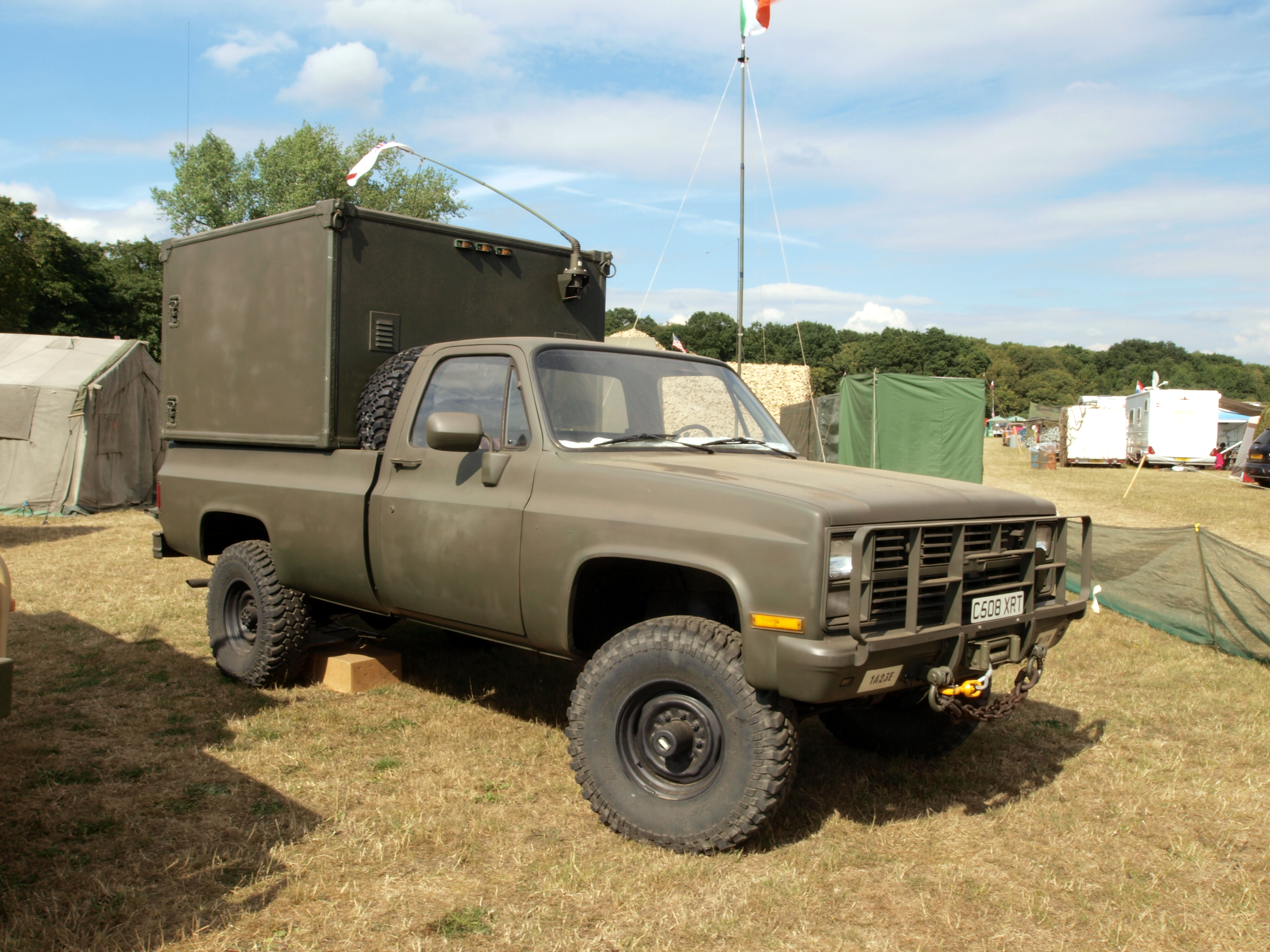
M1008A1

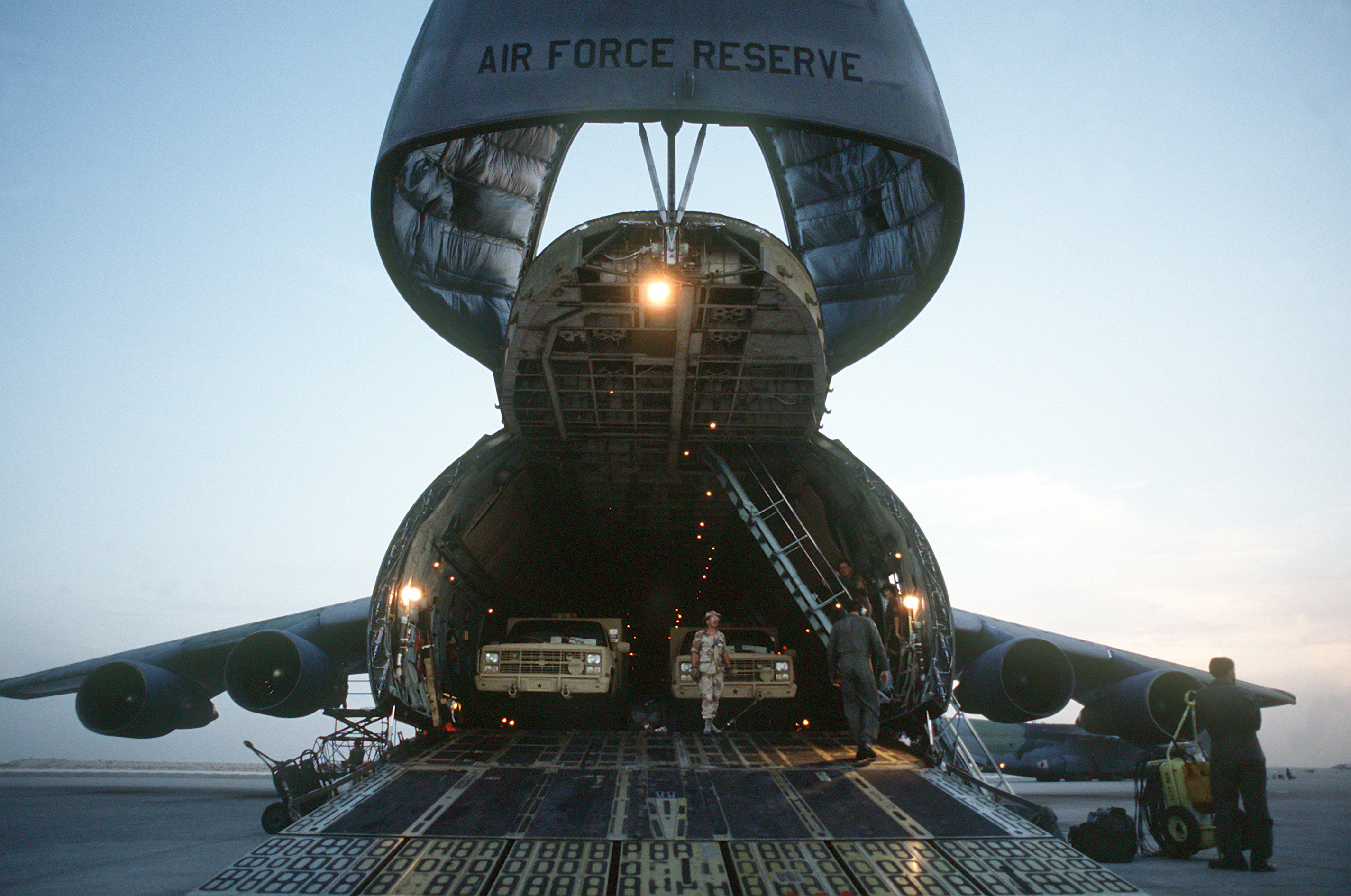
CUCVs loaded in a C-5A reserve aircraft, c. 1990

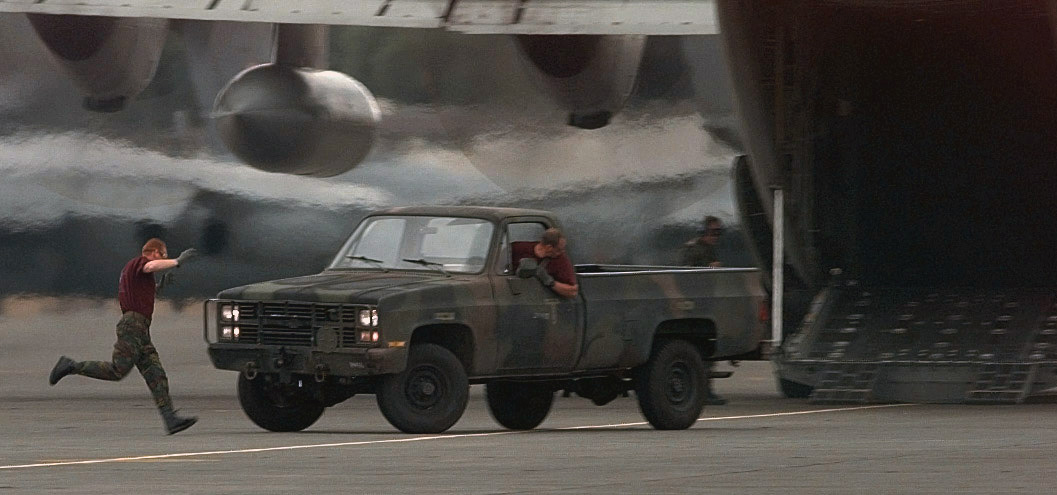
USAF M1008 being loaded into a Belgian Air Force C-130, 1998

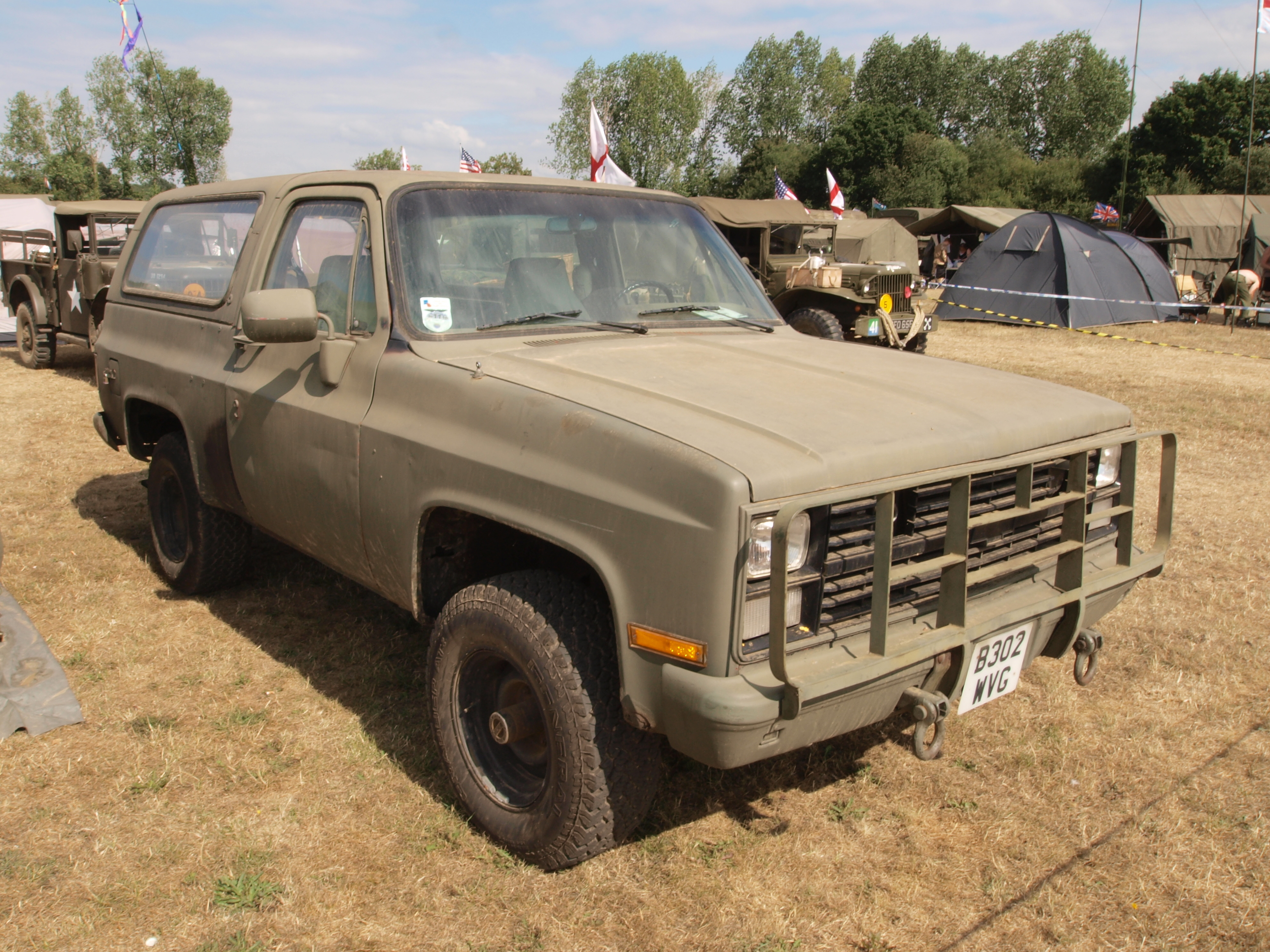
M1009

Arizonan ARNG CUCV in 2006

=== CUCV II ===
CUCV II
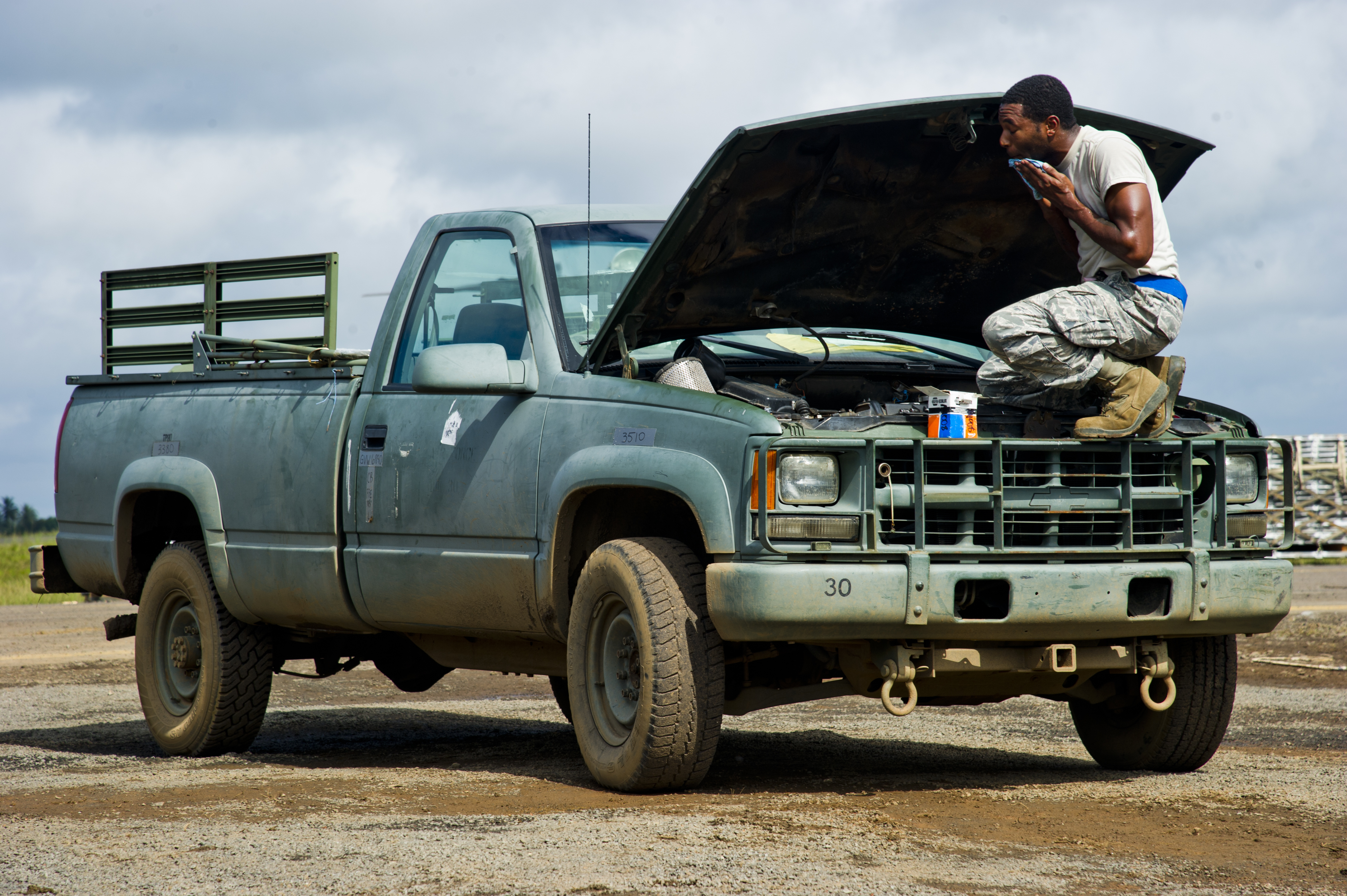

Overview
- Manufacturer: General Motors
- Model years: 1987–2000

Body and chassis
- Body style: 4-door SUV; 2-door pickup 4-door pickup
- Platform: GM GMT400 platform

Powertrain
- Engine: 350 in^{3} (5.7 L) L05 V8; 454 in^{3} (7.4 L) L29/L21 V8; 6.5 L Detroit Diesel V8
- Transmission: 4-speed 700-R4 (4L60) automatic 5-speed manual

Dimensions
- Wheelbase: varies by model
- Length: varies by model
- Width: 81.2 in (2.06 m)
- Height: 75.4 in (1.92 m)
- Curb weight: varies by model

In 1987, GM started building a new generation of CUCV. The US Air Force initially bought small batches of these units, dubbed the CUCV II. Produced through 2001, CUCV IIs were basic civilian Chevrolet C/K, Tahoe, and Suburban units sent to another plant for "militarization" on special order. The trucks were originally white in color with gray vinyl interiors. They received CARC exterior paint (Forest Green, Desert Sand, or 3-color camouflage), a brush bar, a pintle hitch, towing/loading shackles, extra leaf springs to give them a 5/4 ton rating and a host of other small changes. All CUCV IIs have a 24 volt dual-battery starting system, the rest of the truck is 12 volt.

These light utility vehicles were available with three engines: a Vortec 7.4-liter V8, a 5.7-liter V8, or Detroit Diesel 6.5 L V8. Each engine was coupled with a 4-speed automatic or 5-speed manual transmission. All CUCV IIs have full-time all-wheel drive; a front-mounted winch was available as an option.

==== Variants ====
- Type A: Two-door utility vehicle, with space for a driver and four passengers. Based on the K5 Blazer/Tahoe
- Type B: Cargo truck, with open utility bed; seats could be fitted for troop transportation. Based on the Silverado
- Type C: Ambulance, accommodating 4 stretchers or 8 seated casualties
- Type E: Shelter carrier
- Type F: Communications shelter carrier
- Type S: Four-door command car, with space for a driver and five passengers. Based on the Suburban

==== Operators ====
- Ecuador
- Saudi Arabia
- Sweden
- United Kingdom
- United States
- Venezuela

=== LSSV ===
LSSV
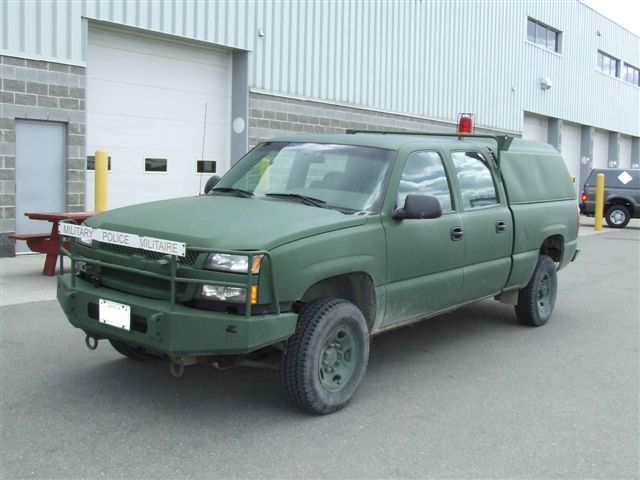

Overview
- Manufacturer: General Motors (2001–2005); AM General (2005–present)
- Model years: 2001–present

Body and chassis
- Body style: 2-door SUV; 4-door SUV; 2-door pickup 4-door pickup
- Platform: GM GMT880 platform

Powertrain
- Engine: 6.6 L Duramax V8
- Transmission: 4-speed 4L80-E automatic 5-speed Allison 1000 automatic

When production of the CUCV II ended in 2000, GM redesigned it to coincide with civilian truck offerings. The CUCV nomenclature was changed to Light Service Support Vehicle (LSSV) in 2001. In 2005, LSSV production switched to AM General, a unit of MacAndrews and Forbes Holdings. The LSSV is a GM-built Chevrolet Silverado 1500, Chevrolet Silverado 2500 HD, Chevrolet Tahoe, or Chevrolet Suburban that is powered by a Duramax 6.6 liter turbo diesel engine. As GM has periodically redesigned its civilian trucks and sport utility vehicles (SUVs) from 2001 to the present, LSSVs have also been updated cosmetically.

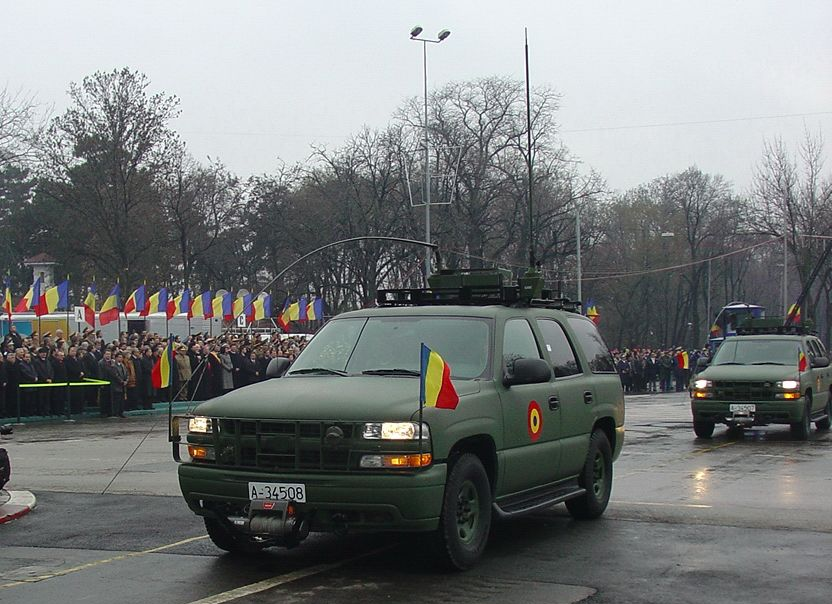
LSSV Tahoes in Romania

The militarization of standard GM trucks/SUVs to become LSSVs includes exterior changes such as Chemical Agent Resistant Coating (CARC) paint (Forest Green, Desert Sand, or 3-color Camouflage), blackout lights, military bumpers, a brush guard, a NATO slave receptacle/NATO trailer receptacle, a pintle hook, tow shackles and a 24/12 volt electrical system. The dashboard has additional controls and dataplates. The truck also can be equipped with weapon supports in the cab, cargo tie down hooks, folding troop seats, pioneer tools, winches, and other military accessories. In the Canadian Army these vehicles are nicknamed "Milverado," a portmanteau for Military Silverado, "Milcot" for military commercial off-the-shelf and "Love W" short for LUVW.

The Enhanced Mobility Package (EMP) option adds an uprated suspension, 4-wheel anti-lock brakes, a locking rear differential, beadlock tires, a Tire Pressure Monitoring System (TPMS) and other upgrades. About 2,000 LSSV units have been sold to U.S. and international military and law enforcement organizations.

==== Variants ====
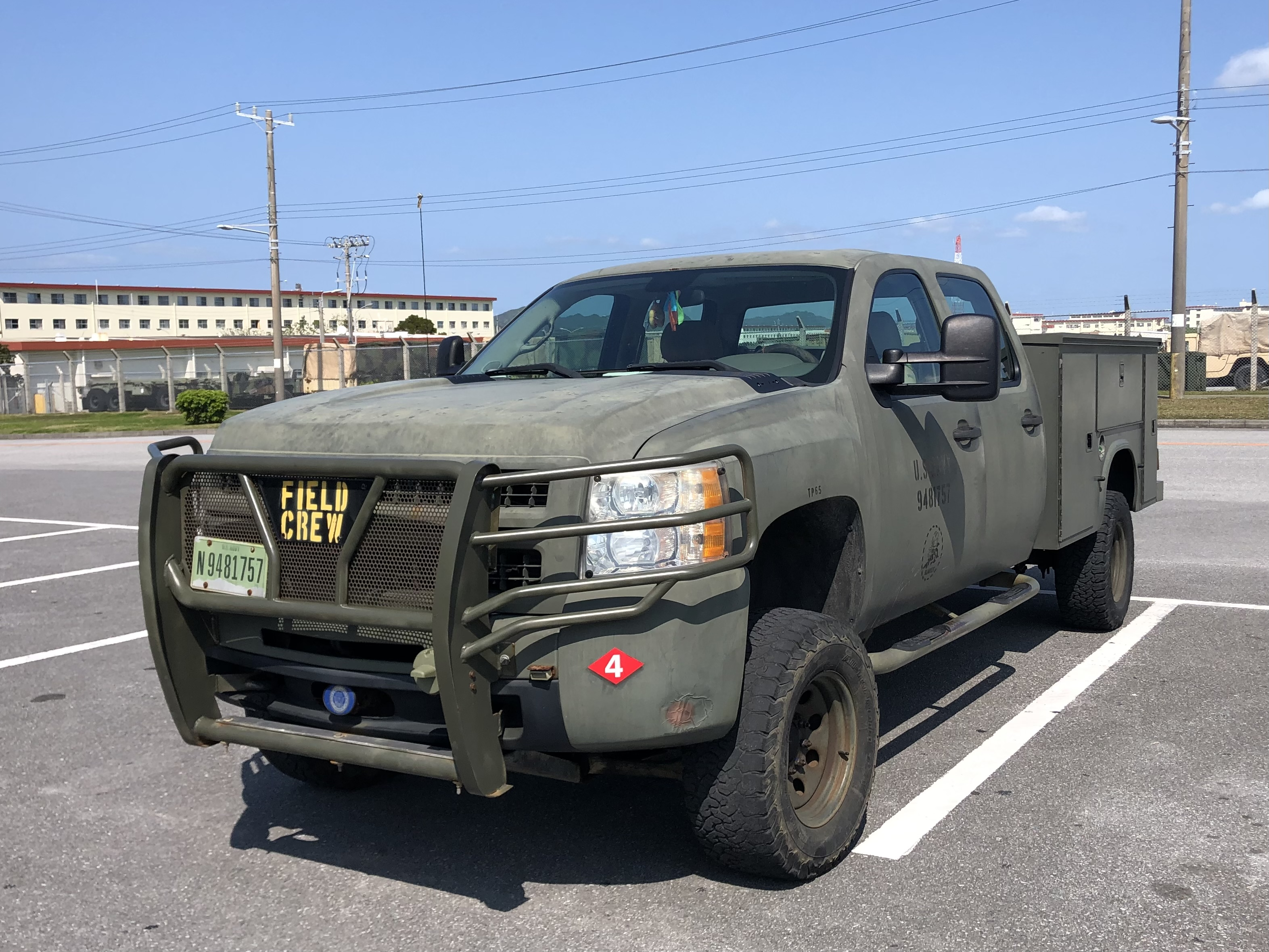
Chevrolet LSSV Utility vehicle based on the 2007-13 Silverado, Camp Butler, Okinawa

- Cargo/Troop Carrier Pickup (2-door, Extended Cab, or 4-door Silverado) — Payload: 3,200 lbs (1454 kg); on-highway max trailer weight: 12,000 lbs (5443 kg)
- Cargo/Troop Carrier or Command Vehicle, based on 4-door Tahoe — Payload: 1,532 lbs (696 kg); on-highway max trailer weight: 8,700 lbs (3946 kg)
- Cargo/Troop Carrier or Command Vehicle, based on 4-door Suburban — Payload: 2,840 lbs (1291 kg); on-highway max trailer weight: 10,000 lbs (4536 kg)
- Ambulance – based on Silverado 2500-HD

==== Operators ====
- Canada
- The Gambia
- Greece
- Romania
- United States

== See also ==
- Land Rover Wolf
- Tarpan Honker
- Jeep J8
