= Marinediesel AB =

Marinediesel AB is a manufacturer of high speed diesel engines for marine use, ranging in power output from 127 kilowatts (170 hp) to 373 kilowatts (500 hp). The company was founded in 1992 in Ängelholm, Sweden.

== Company history ==
Marinediesel AB began as a manufacturer and distributor of automotive parts. In 1997, a remanufacturing plant for engines, both gasoline and diesel, was established, and the development of a line of Marinediesel engines based on the Detroit Diesel V8 engine 6.5L diesel engine was begun. In 1999, AM General purchased this engine production from General Motors, and Marinediesel made an agreement to purchase the base engines from the Hummer factory. In 2001, The Marinediesel line of engines was fully developed and in production as a finished product. In 2008, the MD Engineering division was inaugurated to focus on custom engineering projects for diesel engines, largely in research and development for complex projects and other engine manufacturers. In 2011, Marinediesel started its Marinediesel Powertrain division specifically to serve the industrial diesel engine market.

== Product development ==
The 6.5L engine was the first successful diesel V-8 engine designed specifically for marine use on a commercial scale.

In 2006, Marinediesel started development work on the 6.6L Duramax V8 engine GM diesel engine that entered production as the Marinediesel VGT series. At the same time, Marinediesel became the first GM OEM located outside the US.

Marinediesel has produced some innovations in the marine engine market, including the use of variable-geometry turbocharger (VGT) technology, programmable engine control units that allow custom engine MAP development, and substantial research and development into noise and vibration reduction.

Nearly all engines produced are intended for commercial, military, or government use.

Manufacturing, development and all engine testing is undertaken at the Marinediesel factory in Ängelholm, Sweden. The facility includes three computerised dyno-testing laboratories.
