= DMAX (engines) =

American Diesel engine manufacturer

DMax Ltd.
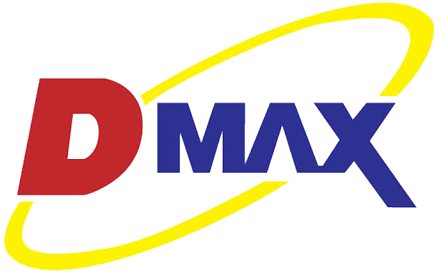
- Type: Joint venture
- Industry: Automotive
- Founded: 1997; 29 years ago
- Headquarters: Dayton, Ohio, United States
- Area served: United States
- Products: Diesel engines
- Owners: General Motors
- Website: dmaxengines.com

DMax Ltd. is an American manufacturer of the Duramax V8 diesel engines for trucks, based in Dayton, Ohio. Engine production began in Moraine, Ohio, in 2000.

== History ==
DMAX originally was announced in 1997 as a 60-40 joint venture between and operated by General Motors and Isuzu. Diesel engine production started in July 2000. The company's Duramax V8 engine has been extremely successful for GM, raising that company's diesel pickup market share to 30% in 2002, up from approximately 5% in 1999.

The DMAX plant was built in Moraine on a land grant site adjacent to a GM plant that made the 6.2/6.5 L Diesel V8 designed by Detroit Diesel. Production of that engine began in 1982. The DMAX Moraine plant was completed in 1999, next to Moraine Assembly, which shut down in 2008. The DMAX Moraine plant added 80 workers in 2005.

The plant is planning to increase production from 580 engines a day, in 2017, to 700 engines a day. To further expand production, in 2019, GM began construction of a new DMAX plant in Brookville, which would send machined engine components to Moraine for final assembly. Completed engines were shipped from Moraine to Flint, Michigan for assembly into vehicles. The Brookville plant opened in 2021. As of November 2023, the daily component production at the Brookville and Moraine plants are 418 blocks and 324 heads; and 500 blocks, 1,440 heads, and 855 crankshafts, respectively. Moraine produces 882 completed engines per day.

According to financial filings, Isuzu wound down its investment in DMAX in May 2022, leaving the company wholly owned by GM. In June 2023, GM announced plans to shift Duramax V8 production from Moraine to an expanded Campus Boulevard plant in Brookville by 2025.

== Engines ==
- Duramax V8 engine – 6.6 L V8 (produced at DMAX)

Completed engines are built for the GMC Sierra, Chevrolet Silverado, and Navistar trucks. Short blocks are produced for Gale Banks Engineering, who complete the engines for the Joint Light Tactical Vehicle, and marine fishing boats.

=== Other Duramax-branded engines ===
General Motors produced multiple diesel engines under the Duramax brand, but these were not built in Moraine. DMAX, Ltd. exclusively produces the Duramax V8.

Other GM Duramax-branded diesel engines
Name	Description	Displacement	Configuration	Based on	Produced	Location
Circle L engine		1.7 L	I4	Isuzu 4EE2	1999–2014?	Isuzu Motors Polska
Duramax I4 engine		2.8 L	I4	VM Motori A 428	2015–2022	GM Rayong in Thailand
Duramax I6 engine	LM2/LZ0 "Baby Duramax" developed for US Light Duty market	3.0 L	I6	New Design	2023–Present	Flint Engine Operations, Flint, Michigan, USA
