= Hummer H1 =

Four-wheel-drive utility vehicle

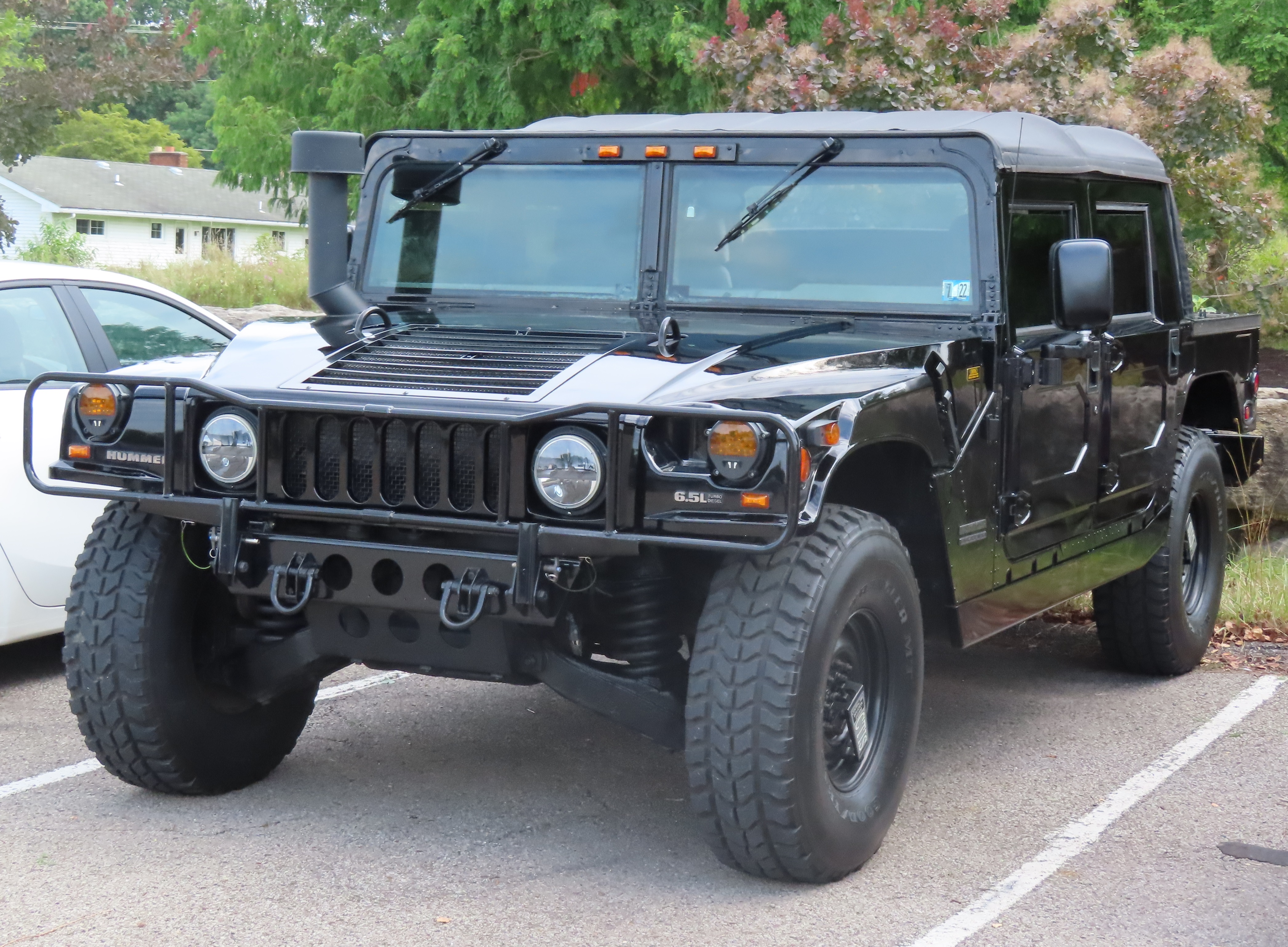
- Hummer HMC Soft Top

Overview
- Manufacturer: AM General
- Also called: Hummer HMC (1992–2002); HMMWV (HUMVee)
- Production: 1992–2006 (11,818 produced)
- Model years: 1992–2004; 2006
- Assembly: United States: Mishawaka, Indiana

Body and chassis
- Class: Full-size SUV / Full-size pickup truck
- Body style: 4-door Open Top - HMCO; 4-door SUV - HMCS; 4-door Hard Top - HMC4; 2-door Fleet - KSC2; 2-door Pickup - XLC2
- Layout: Front-mid engine, four-wheel drive
- Related: Humvee military vehicle

Powertrain
- Engine: 5.7 L L05 V8; 6.2 L Detroit Diesel V8; 6.5 L Detroit Diesel V8; 6.5 L Detroit Diesel V8 (turbo); 6.6 L Duramax Turbo-Diesel V8
- Transmission: GM TH400 / 3L80 3-speed automatic GM 4L80-E 4-speed automatic Allison 1000 5-speed automatic

Dimensions
- Wheelbase: 130 in (3,302 mm)
- Length: 184.5 in (4,686 mm)
- Width: 86.5 in (2,197 mm)
- Height: 77 in (1,956 mm); 2004–06: 79 in (2,007 mm); Pre-2003 Wagon: 75 in (1,905 mm)

The Hummer H1 is a full-size four-wheel-drive utility vehicle based on the M998 Humvee, which was developed by AM General when it was a subsidiary of American Motors Corporation (AMC). Originally designed strictly for military use, the off-road vehicle was released to the civilian market.

The civilian version was produced from 1992 through 2006 and was the first of what became the Hummer line. AM General built both the H1 and the Humvee in its Mishawaka, Indiana, facility. GM stopped marketing the H1 in the 2006 model year, but AM General continued production of the military Humvee versions through 2018.

== History ==
On March 22, 1983, AM General Corporation was awarded a production contract for 55,000 High Mobility Multipurpose Wheeled Vehicles (HMMWV). Nicknamed the Humvee, the vehicles were used by the U.S. military and featured in photographs from the Persian Gulf War during the early 1990s. The vehicle was also promoted by actor Arnold Schwarzenegger, who was so interested in the Humvee design that he specifically advocated for AM General to produce a civilian version of the vehicle. After the Gulf War was over, AM General modified the M998 Humvee military version for the civilian marketplace powered by 6.2 L GM Diesel V8 engine. The civilian version of the Humvee, marketed as the Hummer, went on sale in 1992. The interior was largely influenced by semi-trucks.

Under a 1999 deal, General Motors bought marketing rights to the Hummer name, began marketing Hummer-branded vehicles designed by GM, and rebadged the original version built by AM General as the Hummer H1. At the time, GM began marketing the Hummer H2 that was also assembled by AM General on a modified GMC Sierra 2500HD chassis.

General Motors announced that 2006 would be the last model year for the Hummer H1, with civilian market production winding down in June 2006 due to new emission regulations for diesel-engined vehicles that were to take effect in 2007. The final 2006 models had the most powerful engine and also improved fuel efficiency—about 10 mpg_{‑US} (24 L/100 km; 12 mpg_{‑imp}).

AM General continued the production of military Humvee versions until 2018.

== Specifications ==
The Hummer H1 was available in three major variants: a convertible-like soft top, a four-door hard top Sport Utility Truck, and an "Alpha Wagon" body version. Less known variants were a two-door pickup truck and a four-door slantback, which shares the same body style as the Humvee employed by the U.S. military. The convertible/soft top and the station SUV versions were the last types available to individual consumers.

There were five engine types and three automatic transmission types available. Typical engine/automatic transmission combinations included:

- 5.7 L (350 ci) L05 gasoline V8 TBI/GM 4L80-E 4-speed
- 6.2 L GM Diesel V8/GM TH400/3L80 3-speed
- 6.5 L GM Diesel V8/GM 4L80-E 4-speed
- 6.5 L turbo GM Diesel V8/GM 4L80-E 4-speed
- 6.6 L turbo Duramax LLY V8 turbo Diesel/Allison 1000 5-speed (2006 only)

The Hummer H1 shares some common driveline parts with the HMMWV. These include brakes, axles, and frame, as well as major body panels (hood, tailgate, and quarter panels) that are shared between the HMMWV and Hummer H1. All H1s and HMMWVs were produced on the same assembly line; of which the civilian H1s were painted and finished in a separate building.

The H1 models feature a wide track and 86.5 in width due to the original Humvees necessity to be able to drive in the tracks left by military tanks. They can ford 30 inches (762 mm) of water and climb a 22-inch (559 mm) step. The standard 16-inch (406 mm) ground clearance is achieved by positioning driveline components high inside a wide channel in the center of the passenger compartment, meaning that despite the large interior volume, the H1 only had seating for four. Approach and departure angles are 72 and 37.5 degrees. A Central Tire Inflation System (CTIS) controls the tire air pressure allowing lower tire pressures for off-road and higher tire pressures on-road.

Other features include inboard brakes and portal gears to position drivetrain's half shafts higher for greater ground clearance. The radiator is mounted high, sloping over the engine on a forward-hinged hood. The air intake is high, enabling the H1 to ford waist-level water. Options included magnesium-aluminum alloy or rubber inserts for run-flat tire ability. Other options include leather seats, a winch kit, and running boards.

== 2006 H1 Alpha ==
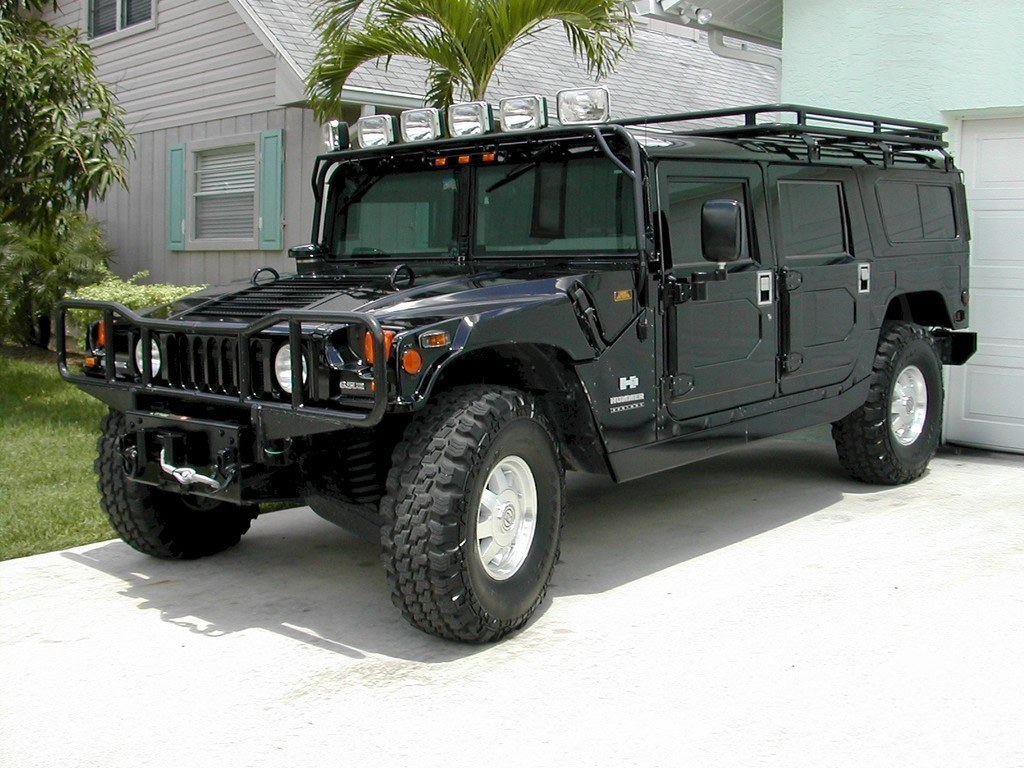
Hummer H1 Alpha Enclosed

The "Alpha" was a re-engineered H1 equipped with GM's 6.6 L Duramax Diesel and 5-speed Allison transmission. This replaced the previous GM 6.5 L diesel engine.

The update program commenced in late 2002 with a production launch in the fall of 2004. To fit into the H1 engine bay, 23 engine component changes were incorporated as well as a 2.0 in (51 mm) body lift to accommodate the taller engine and its turbo housing (a prior 0.5 in (13 mm) lift had been done for MY96 to accommodate the turbo on the 6.5 L engine). The 8th digit of the VIN is 3, setting this version of the 6.6L Duramax apart from the versions used in pickup trucks. The GMT560 engine output was 300 hp (220 kW) and 520 lb⋅ft (705 N⋅m) of torque. The engine was equipped with cooled exhaust gas recirculation and an internal engine oil cooler, thus, requiring a 40% heat rejection increase to engine coolant. Because space was limited between the air-lift brackets that protruded from the hood, the fan system was modified by putting it directly under the cool pack and driving it through a special gearbox directly off the crankshaft damper pulley. Several other cooling system modifications were required to assist with cold starting from −30 °F (−34 °C).

Other major modifications included the use of special high-strength steel in the chassis frame, a more powerful steering gear; quieter axle differentials, redesign of the geared hubs to use quieter helical gears, new induction, exhaust, and electrical power systems; and re-engineering of the fuel supply and filtration system.

The Duramax engine delivered more torque at lower engine speeds than the 6.5 L, combined with a lower gearing ratio (about 44.5 to 1 in the low lock) made the vehicle more powerful. Other changes included centralized tire inflation and a new interior.

Production launch was early in 2005 with vehicles built classified as model year 2006 - the 10th digit in VIN is a 6.

The program was canceled in May 2006, because sales of the nearly $129,000 vehicle had not improved, with production ending in June 2006.

== The Hummer brand ==
On June 2, 2009, General Motors attempted a sale of its Hummer brand to a Chinese company, Tengzhong, as part of its bankruptcy settlement. By October 2009, an agreement was reached following a year-long effort by GM to unload a brand "that had become synonymous with gas-guzzling excess."

On February 24, 2010, General Motors announced that the company was shutting down its Hummer brand due to Tengzhong withdrawing its bid. Tengzhong stated that the bid was withdrawn due to a failure to get approval from the Chinese government.

On January 30, 2020, General Motors announced the revival of the Hummer nameplate, which would be used as a new electric off-road vehicle within its GMC brand. The new vehicle, now known as the GMC Hummer EV, will have two variants, an SUV and a truck ("SUT").

== Production ==
| Model year | Production |
|---|---|
| 1992 | 316 |
| 1993 | 612 |
| 1994 | 718 |
| 1995 | 1,432 |
| 1996 | 1,374 |
| 1997 | 1,209 |
| 1998 | 945 |
| 1999 | 831 |
| 2000 | 1,333 |
| 2001 | 869 |
| 2002 | 704 |
| 2003 | 494 |
| 2004 | 252 |
| 2005 | 0 |
| 2006 | 729 |
| Total | 11,818 |

While there was no 2005 model year Hummer H1, the 2006 model year H1 Alphas were manufactured in both 2005 and 2006. A total of 448 H1 Alphas were produced from January through May 2005, and 281 H1 Alphas were produced from September 2005 through May 2006, when the production for the Hummer H1 officially ended.

in 2017, VLF Automotive was contracted to build about 100 H1s from kits supplied by AM General. Called the Humvee C-Series, these will be exported to Africa, Europe, the Middle East, and China.

== Gallery ==
Hummer H1 models

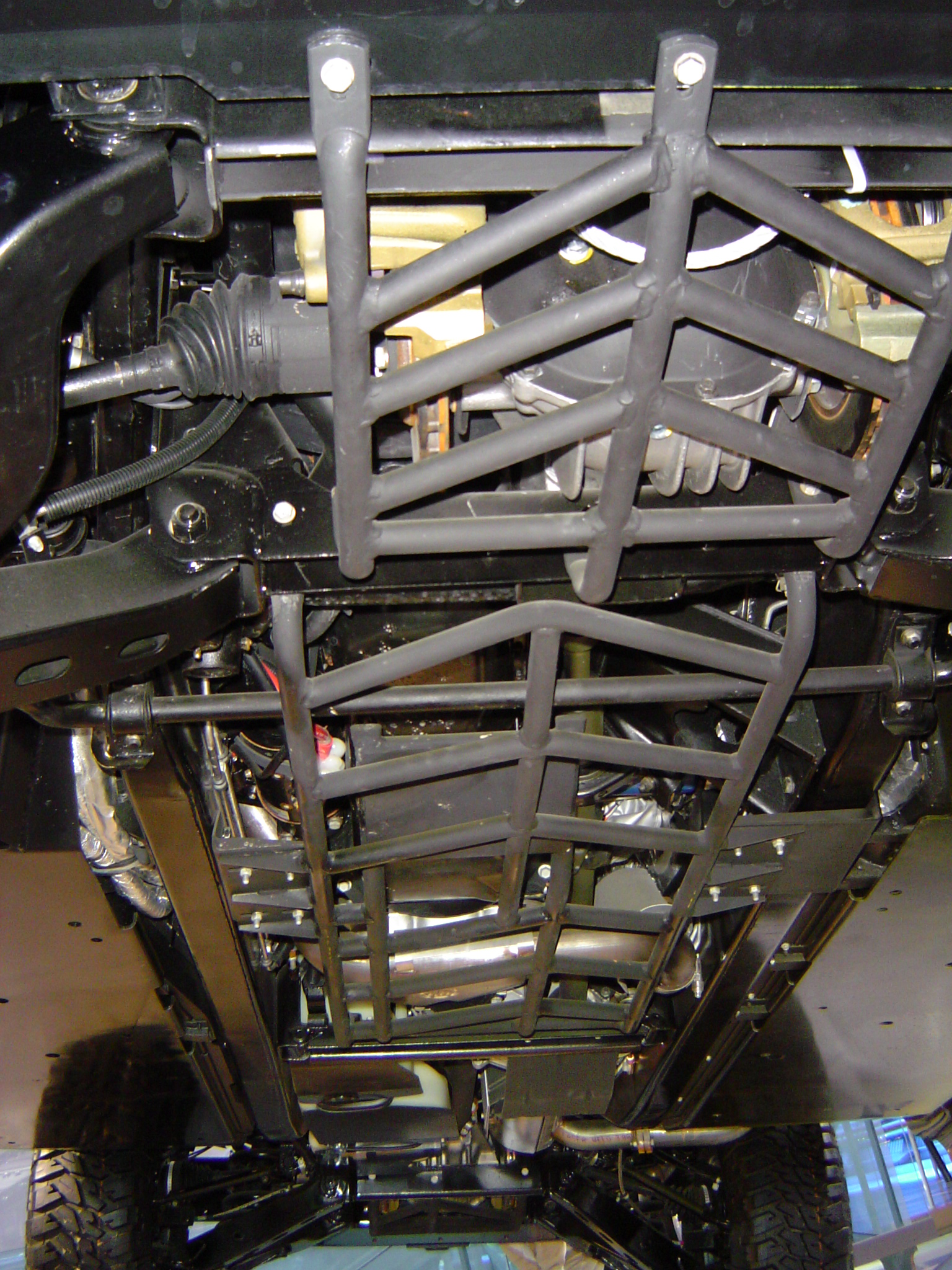
2004 Hummer H1 undercarriage

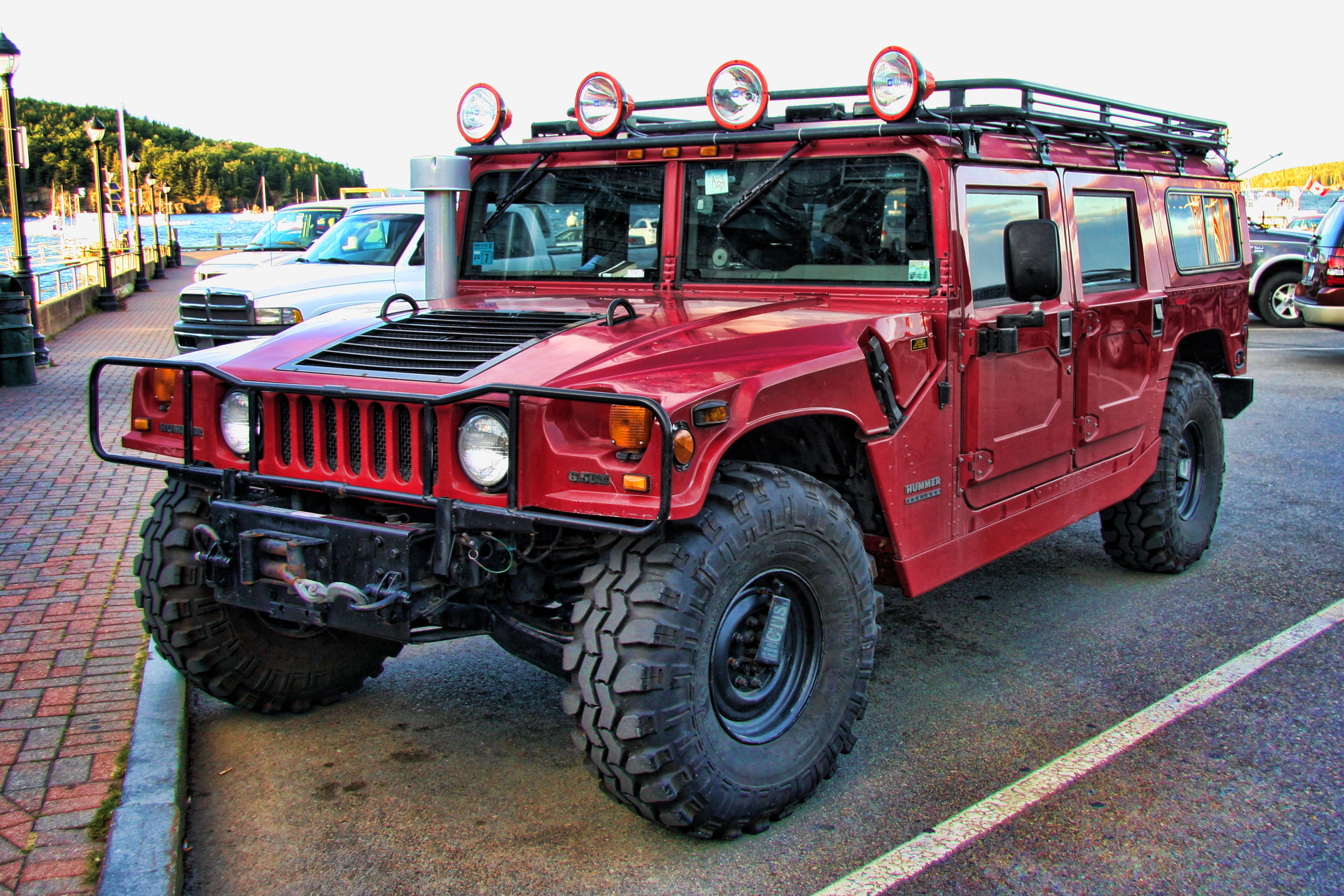
Modified red Hummer H1

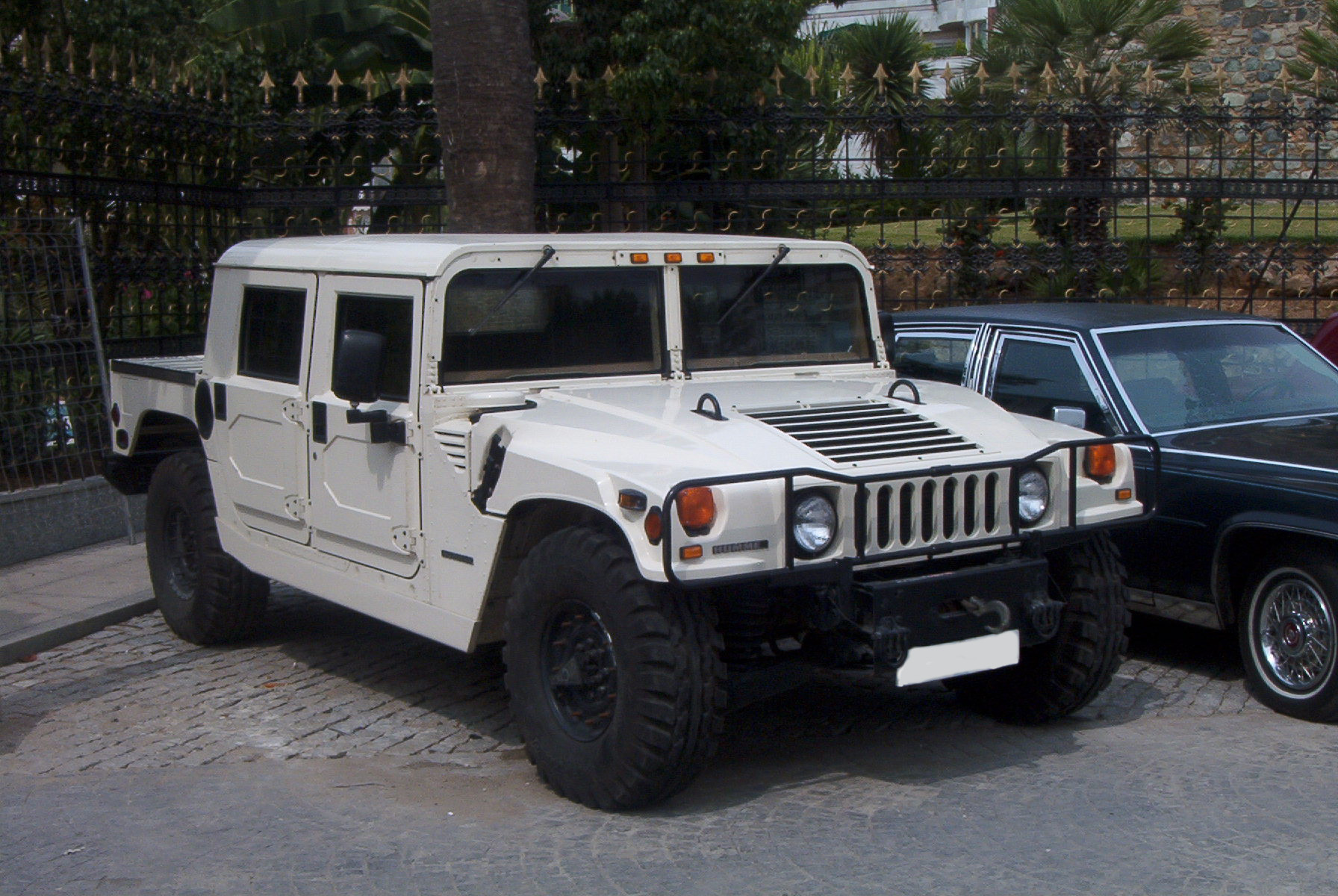
Hummer H1 in white

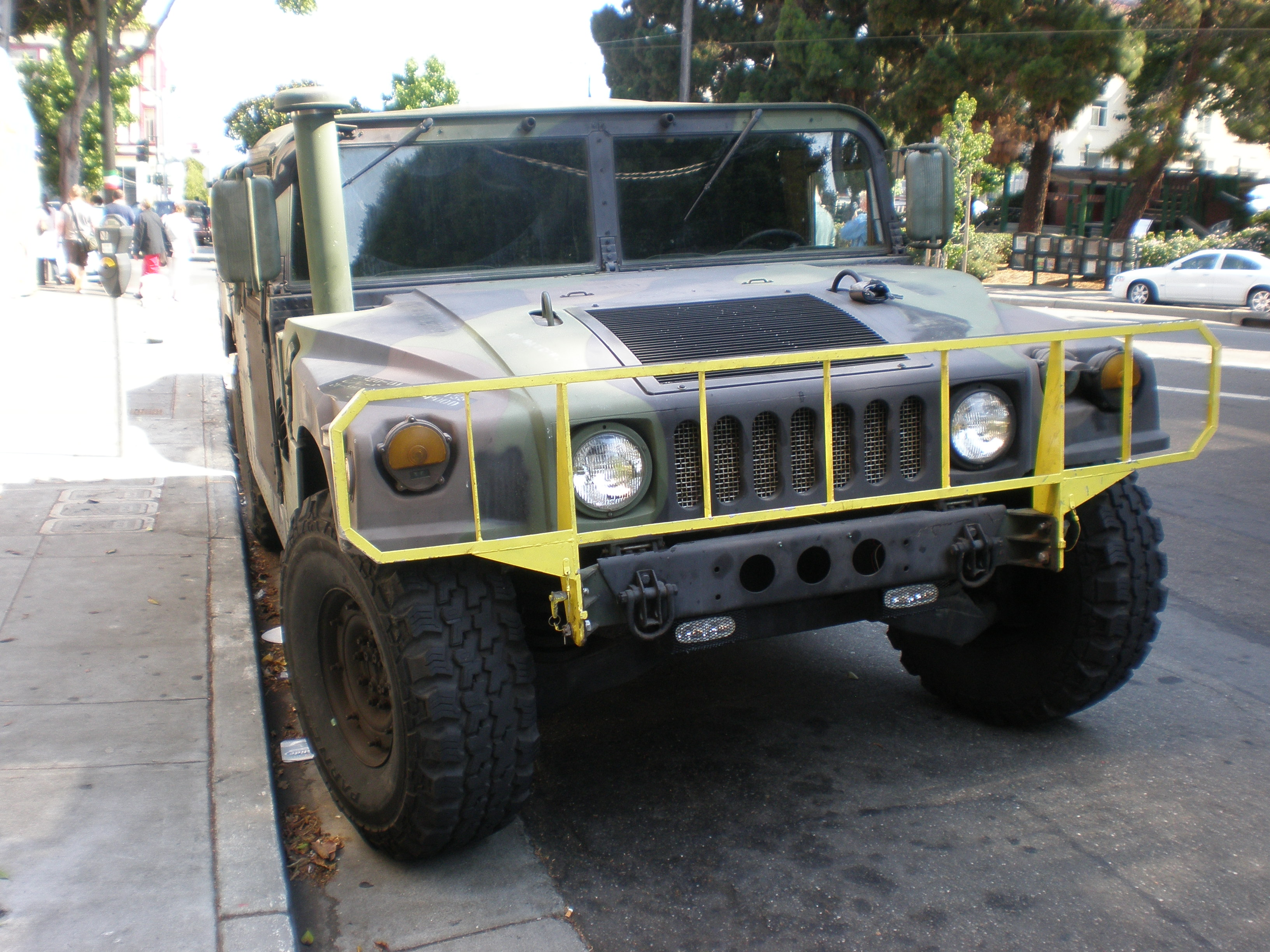
Camouflaged Humvee military version

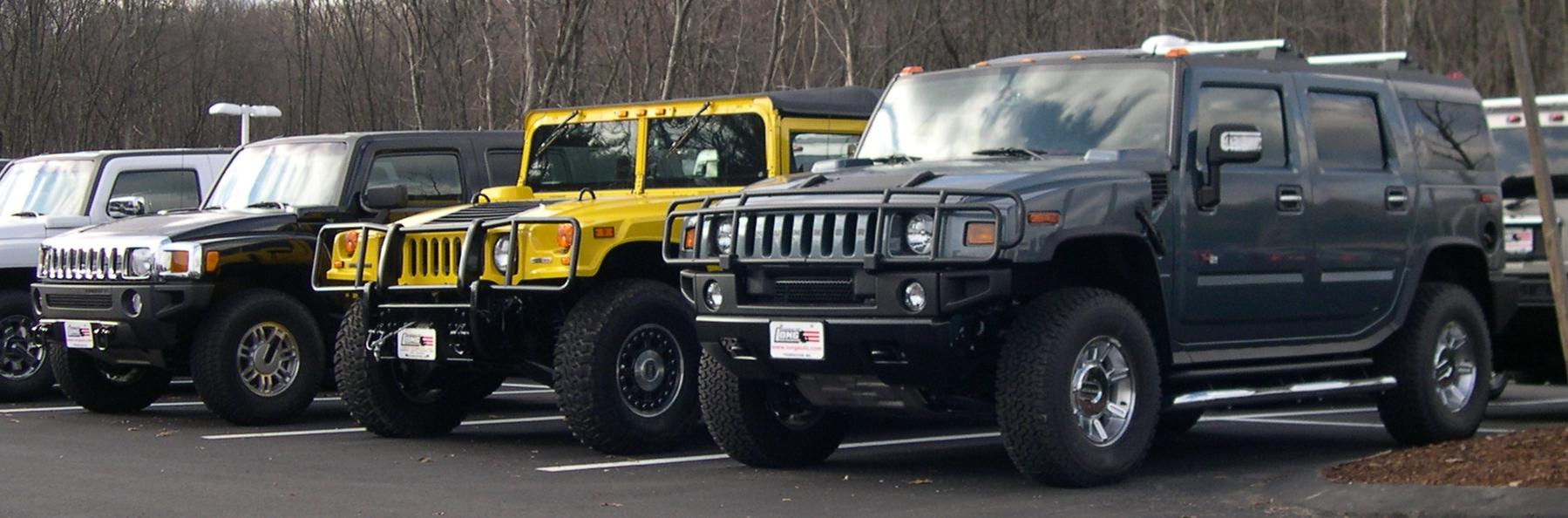
Hummer H3, Hummer H1, and Hummer H2 comparison
