= Duramax V8 engine =

Duramax Diesel engine
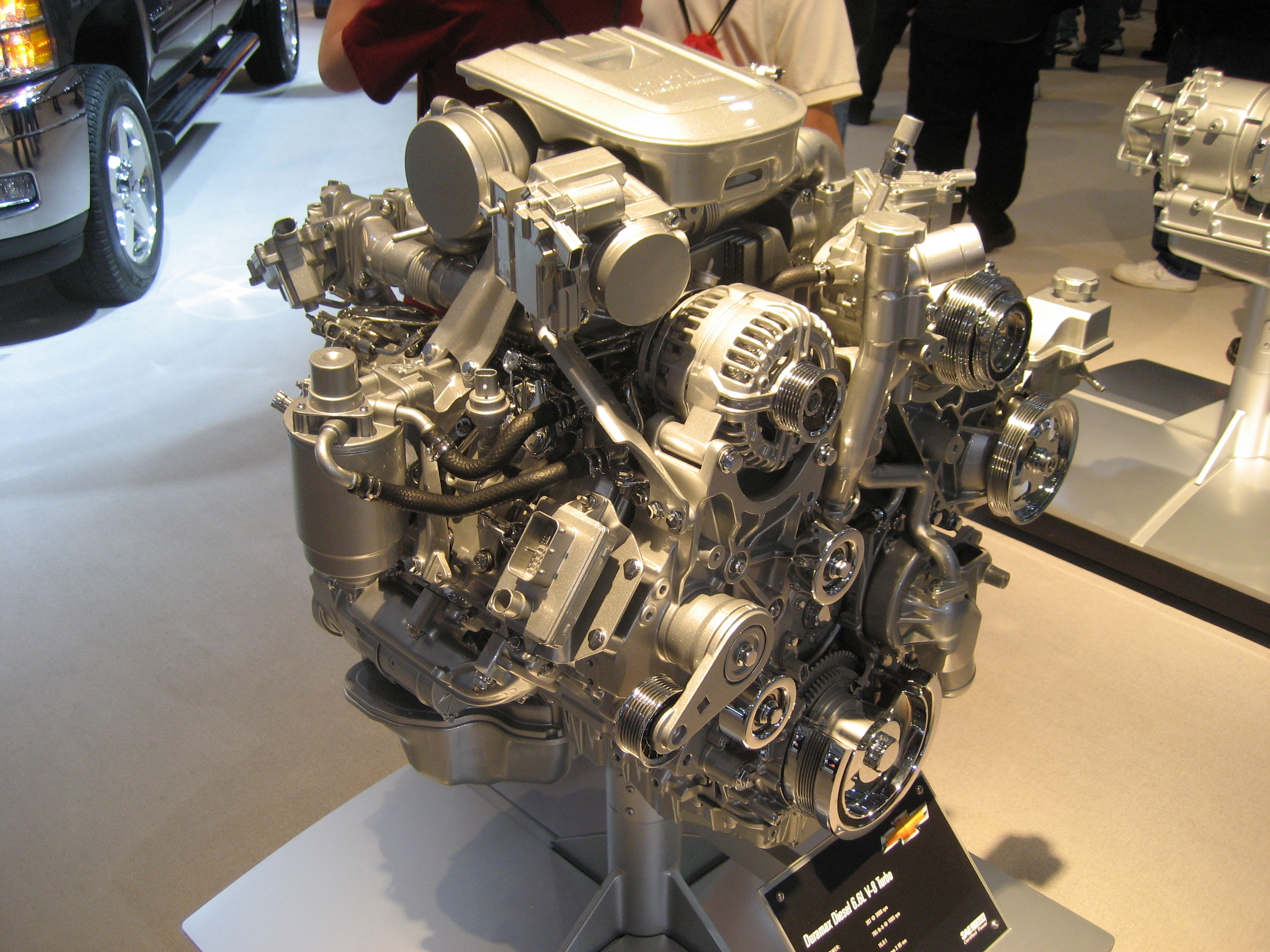
- Duramax LML, equipped with polished accessories for showcasing

Overview
- Manufacturer: DMAX Ltd.
- Production: 2001–present

Layout
- Configuration: 90° V8
- Displacement: 6.6 L; 402.7 cu in (6,599 cc); 8.3 L; 506.5 cu in (8,300 cc) (Exact displacement unconfirmed)
- Cylinder bore: 4.06 in (103 mm) (6.6)
- Piston stroke: 3.90 in (99 mm) (6.6)
- Cylinder block material: Cast gray iron
- Cylinder head material: Aluminum
- Valvetrain: OHV 4 valves x cyl.
- Valvetrain drive system: Gears
- Compression ratio: 16.8:1, 17.5:1

Combustion
- Turbocharger: Garrett variable-geometry vane with intercooler
- Fuel system: High-pressure common-rail direct injection
- Management: Bosch
- Fuel type: Diesel
- Cooling system: Water-cooled

Output
- Power output: 250–555 hp (186–414 kW)
- Torque output: 460–1,230 lb⋅ft (624–1,668 N⋅m)

Emissions
- Emissions target standard: EPA
- Emissions control systems: Oxidizing catalyst, DPF, EGR

Chronology
- Predecessor: 6.2 and 6.5 L Detroit Diesel

The Duramax V8 engine is a family of diesel V8 engines produced by Isuzu for use in GM trucks and vans. The Duramax engine blocks are supplied by Fritz Winter, a German foundry, whereas the heads are supplied from other vendors. This engine was initially installed in 2001 Chevrolet and GMC trucks, and has since become an option in pickups, vans, and medium-duty trucks. In 2006, production at Moraine was reportedly limited to approximately 200,000 engines per year. On May 9, 2007, DMAX announced the production of the 1,000,000th Duramax V8 at its Moraine facility, followed by the 2,000,000th on March 24, 2017.

== 6.6L ==
=== LB7 ===
RPO LB7 (engine code "1") was first introduced in 2001 and continued until early 2004. It featured a 32-valve design with high-pressure common-rail direct injection and aluminum cylinder heads.

The following trucks use the LB7:

- Chevrolet Kodiak/GMC TopKick
- Chevrolet Silverado/GMC Sierra HD

==== Specifications ====
- Block / Head: Cast Iron / Aluminum
- Compression: 17.5:1
- Injection: Direct; Bosch high-pressure common-rail
- Power / Torque: 300 hp (224 kW) at 3,100 rpm / 520 lb⋅ft (705 N⋅m) at 1,800 rpm

The LLY was introduced in 2004 and completely replaced the LB7 mid-year.

=== LLY ===
The LLY (internally called the 8GF1) (engine code "2") is a 6.6 L; 402.7 cu in (6,599 cc) turbocharged engine which debuted in mid-2004 and continued until the end of 2005 (except the Hummer H1 in 2006). It is a 32-valve design with high-pressure common-rail direct injection and aluminum cylinder heads. The LLY was GM's first attempt to implement emissions requirements on their diesel trucks. To meet this goal, they turned to a newly developed Garrett turbocharger with a variable geometry vane system and installed an EGR valve. Learning from problems with injectors in the previous LB7, GM changed the valve covers to allow access to the injectors without having to remove the valve covers, saving significant labor costs if injector replacement became necessary.

The following trucks used the LLY engine:

- 2006-only Hummer H1 Alpha
- Chevrolet Silverado/GMC Sierra 2500HD/3500

==== Specifications ====
- Block / Head: Cast gray iron / Cast aluminum
- Compression: 17.5:1
- Injection: Bosch high-pressure common-rail
- Power / Torque: 310 bhp (231 kW) at 3000 rpm / 605 lb⋅ft (820 N⋅m) at 1600 rpm
- Head casting is 8GF1
- Block casting is #22351021213

=== LLY/LBZ ===
There are two VIN codes for the LBZ. The first is VIN 2 produced in late 2005 and early 2006. The VIN 2 engine is mechanically and physically the same as the VIN D engine but utilizes LLY engine tuning due to the LBZ tuning taking longer to be EPA certified and placed into production.

The second is VIN D. This was introduced in 2006 and continued into 2007 sold only in the "classic" body style. It has an improved engine computer tune that produces increased power and torque over the 2005 LLY version of the engine. This also marked the first appearance of the Duramax in the Express/Savana vans. The LBZ is one of the more sought-after Duramax engines because of its strength, reliability, and being pre-emissions (DPF appeared on the next generation LMM in 2007).

Changes include:

- Cylinder block casting and machining changes strengthen the bottom of the cylinder bores to support increased power and torque
- Upgraded main bearing material increases durability
- Revised piston design lowers compression ratio to 16.8:1 from 17.5:1
- Piston pin bore diameter increased for added strength
- Connecting rod "I" section is thicker for added strength
- Cylinder heads revised to accommodate lower compression and reduced cylinder firing pressure
- Maximum injection pressure increased from 23,000 psi (1,585.8 bar) to more than 26,000 psi (1,792.6 bar)
- Fuel delivered via higher-pressure pump, fuel rails, distribution lines and all-new, seven-hole fuel injectors
- Fuel injectors spray directly onto glow plugs, providing faster, better-quality starts and more complete cold-start combustion for reduced emissions
- Improved glow plugs heat up faster through an independent controller
- Revised variable-geometry turbocharger is aerodynamically more efficient to help deliver smooth and immediate response and lower emissions
- Air induction system re-tuned to enhance quietness
- EGR has larger cooler to bring more exhaust into the system
- First application of new, 32-bit E35 controller, which adjusts and compensates for the fuel flow to bolster efficiency and reduce emissions

LBZ applications:

- Chevrolet Silverado 2500HD/3500
- Chevrolet Kodiak
- GMC Sierra 2500HD/3500
- GMC TopKick
- Chevrolet Silverado/GMC Sierra 2500HD/3500 Classic

LLY applications:

- Chevrolet Silverado 2500HD/3500
- Chevrolet Kodiak
- GMC Sierra 2500HD/3500
- Chevrolet Express full-size (reduced power output mated to a 4L85E transmission)
- GMC Savana full-size (reduced power output mated to a 4L85E transmission)

==== Specifications ====
- Block / Head: Cast gray iron / Cast aluminum
- Compression: 16.8:1
- Injection: Bosch high-pressure common-rail
- Power / Torque: 360 bhp @3200 rpm / 650 lb-ft @1600 rpm

Code	Years	Power output	Torque	Redline
LB7 (Chevrolet Silverado 2500HD / 3500 Classic (auto trans), GMC Sierra 2500HD / 3500 Classic (auto trans))	2001–2004	300 bhp (224 kW) @ 3200 rpm	520 lb⋅ft (705 N⋅m) @ 1600 rpm	3450 rpm
LLY (Chevrolet Kodiak Medium Duty (LRX option), GMC TopKick Medium Duty (LRX option), Hummer H1 Alpha)	2004–2005	310 bhp (231 kW) @ 3000 rpm	605 lb⋅ft (820 N⋅m) @ 1600 rpm	3200 rpm
LBZ(Chevrolet Kodiak Medium Duty (LPD option), GMC TopKick Medium Duty (LPD))	2006–2007	310 bhp (231 kW) @ 3000 rpm	605 lb⋅ft (820 N⋅m) @ 1600 rpm	3200 rpm
LLY (Chevrolet Express, GMC Savana)	2006–2007	250 bhp (186 kW) @ 3200 rpm	460 lb⋅ft (624 N⋅m) @ 1600 rpm	3450 rpm

=== LMM ===
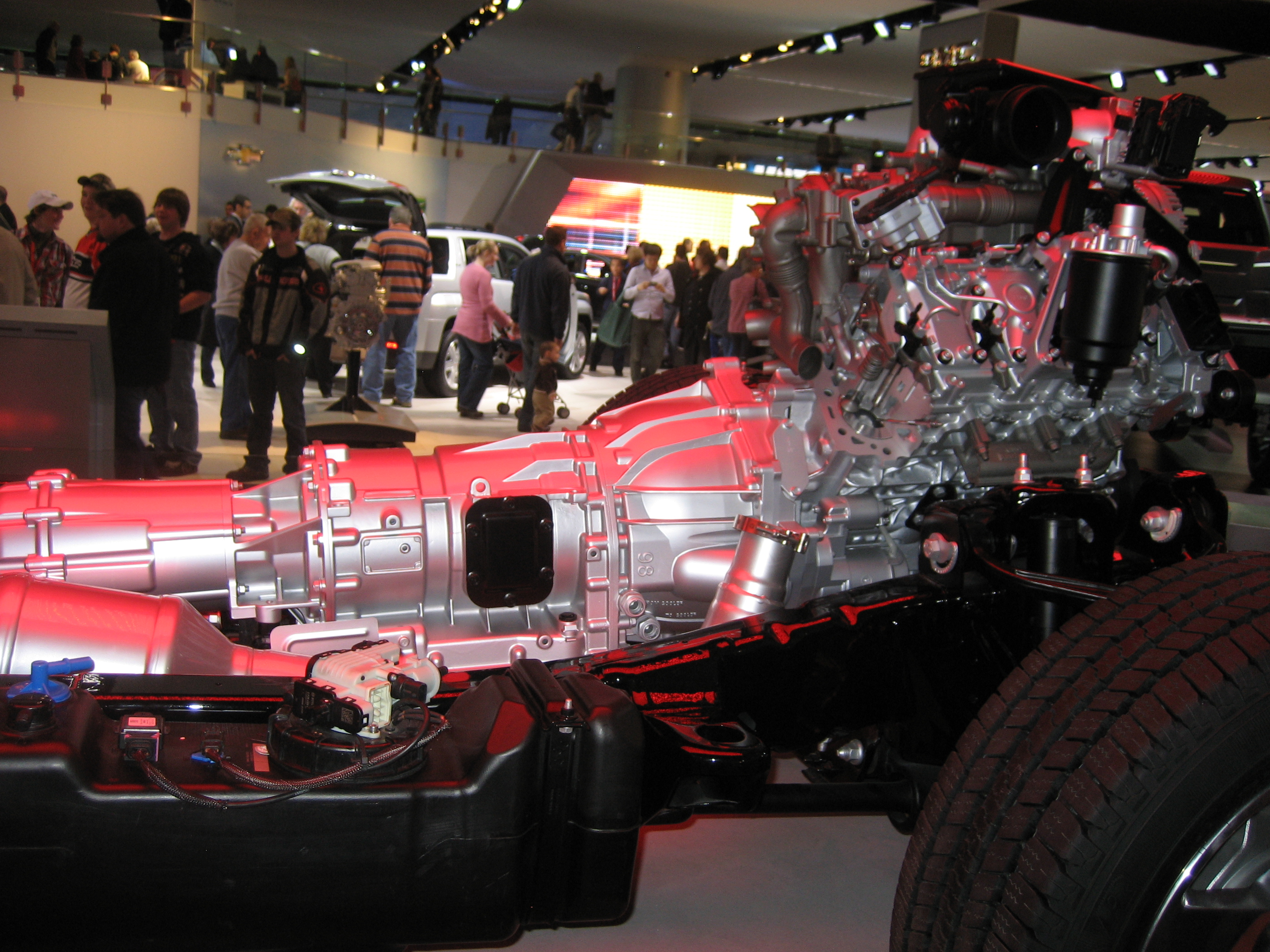
Allison 1000 attached to Duramax 6.6 Diesel

The LMM (engine code "6") debuted part way through 2007 and ended production with the start of the 2011 calendar year and is mated to the 6-speed Allison transmission. The LMM was the only Duramax offered for model years 2007–2010. A version was used in the Trident Iceni.

==== Specifications ====
- Block / Head: Cast gray iron / Cast aluminum
- Compression: 16.8:1
- Injection: Bosch high-pressure common-rail with CP3.3 injection pump
- Power / Torque: 365 bhp (272 kW) at 3200 rpm / 660 lb⋅ft (895 N⋅m) at 1600 rpm

Code	Years	Power output	Torque	Redline
LML (Chevrolet Silverado/GMC Sierra HD)	2011–2016	397 bhp (296 kW) @ 3000 rpm	765 lb⋅ft (1,037 N⋅m) @ 1600 rpm	3450 rpm
LMM (Chevrolet Silverado/GMC Sierra HD)	2007–2010	365 bhp (272 kW) @ 3200 rpm	660 lb⋅ft (895 N⋅m) @ 1600 rpm	3450 rpm
LMM (Chevrolet Kodiak/GMC TopKick (LYE option))	2007–2010	330 bhp (246 kW) @ 3000 rpm	620 lb⋅ft (841 N⋅m) @ 1600 rpm	3250 rpm
LMM (Chevrolet Kodiak/GMC TopKick (LRX option))	2007–2010	300 bhp (224 kW) @ 3000 rpm	520 lb⋅ft (705 N⋅m) @ 1600 rpm	3250 rpm
LMM (Chevrolet Express/GMC Savana)	2007–2010	250 bhp (186 kW) @ 3200 rpm	460 lb⋅ft (624 N⋅m) @ 1600 rpm	3450 rpm
LGH (Chevrolet Express/GMC Savana)	2010–2016	260 bhp (194 kW) @ 3100 rpm	525 lb⋅ft (712 N⋅m) @ 1600 rpm	3450 rpm

Emission controls:

- Additional combustion control, including an even more efficient variable-geometry turbocharging system, cooled (enhanced) exhaust gas recirculation (EGR), and closed crankcase ventilation to reduce nitrogen oxides (NOx)
- Additional exhaust control, including oxidizing catalyst and new diesel particulate filter (DPF) to reduce soot and particulate matter
- Increased-capacity cooling system
- New engine control software
- Use of low-ash engine oil (CJ-4)

Applications:

- 2007–2010 Chevrolet Silverado HD
- 2007–2010 GMC Sierra HD
- 2007–2010 Chevrolet Kodiak
- 2007–2010 GMC TopKick
- 2007–2010 Chevrolet Express/GMC Savana

=== LGH ===
The 6.6L Duramax diesel engine (VIN code "L") is used on 2010 interim and 2011 Chevrolet Express and GMC Savana vans and 2011 Chevrolet Silverado/GMC Sierra HD trucks with RPO ZW9 (chassis cabs or trucks with pickup box delete). The LGH engine is rated at 335 bhp (250 kW) at 3,100 rpm and 685 lb⋅ft (929 N⋅m) at 1,600 rpm. Similar to the LML, this engine also uses a DPF and DEF system to meet emissions standards.

=== LML ===
The 6.6L RPO LML (VIN code "8") is the 2011–2016 version of the Isuzu/GM Duramax V8 diesel engine. It is a further advanced version of the LMM engine with the majority of the changes addressing a required drastic reduction in engine emissions. Some mechanical aspects of the engine, such as piston oil flow design for improved temperature control and oil pump design, were also improved to enhance durability even further.

The LML engine was significantly updated for 2011 to comply with the new federal emissions standards for diesel engines, provide better engine rigidity, and further noise reduction. The engine gained new 29,000 PSI piezo injectors as well as a completely reworked fuel system which was now powered by the Bosch CP4 pump, that also now supports up to 20% biodiesel mixtures and a urea injection (to reduce nitrogen oxides) with a 5.3 gallon DEF tank. This engine has a fuel injector in the exhaust tract, to allow raw fuel injection during the particulate filter recycling routine. The RPO LML engine is rated at 397 hp (296 kW) at 3,000 rpm and 765 lb⋅ft (1,037 N⋅m) of torque at 1,600 rpm.

=== L5P ===
The L5P Duramax is the 2017-2026 version of the Duramax V8 diesel engine.(engine code Y). Introduced in the 2017 model year, it was the most powerful diesel engine GM had produced, with 445 hp (332 kW) at 2,800 rpm and 910 lb⋅ft (1,234 N⋅m) at 1,600 rpm. Design specification performance can exceed 550 bhp (410 kW) at 3,050 rpm and 1,050 lb⋅ft (1,424 N⋅m) at 1,975 rpm.

=== L5P Gen2 ===
The L5P Duramax received an increase in power and torque for the 2024 model year; 470 hp (350 kW) at 2,800 rpm and 975 lb⋅ft (1,322 N⋅m) at 1,600 rpm. Design specification performance can exceed 550 bhp (410 kW) at 3050 rpm and 1,050 lb⋅ft (1,424 N⋅m) at 1975 rpm.

=== L5D ===
The L5D Duramax is a downrated version of the L5P for the Chevrolet Silverado MD and International CV trucks (Class 4, 5, and 6). The L5D was downrated to increase reliability and reduce downtime. The L5D was introduced in 2018 for the 2019 Chevrolet Silverado MD and International CV trucks. Specifications for the L5D are 350 hp (261 kW) at 2,600 rpm and 700 lb⋅ft (949 N⋅m) at 1,600 rpm.

== 8.3L Mongoose ==
=== L6P ===
In 2026, for the 2027 model year, GM announced an all-new Duramax diesel engine, internally codenamed "Mongoose" and given the RPO code L6P. The L6P remains a 90° V8, but displaces 8.3L. Power and torque figures are advertised as 555 hp (414 kW) at 2,500 rpm and 1,230 lb⋅ft (1,668 N⋅m) at 1,400 rpm. This engine debuted in the 2027 Chevrolet Silverado HD and GMC Sierra HD and completely replaced the L5P.

== See also ==
- Marinediesel AB
