= Detroit Diesel V8 engine =

General Motors–Detroit Diesel V8
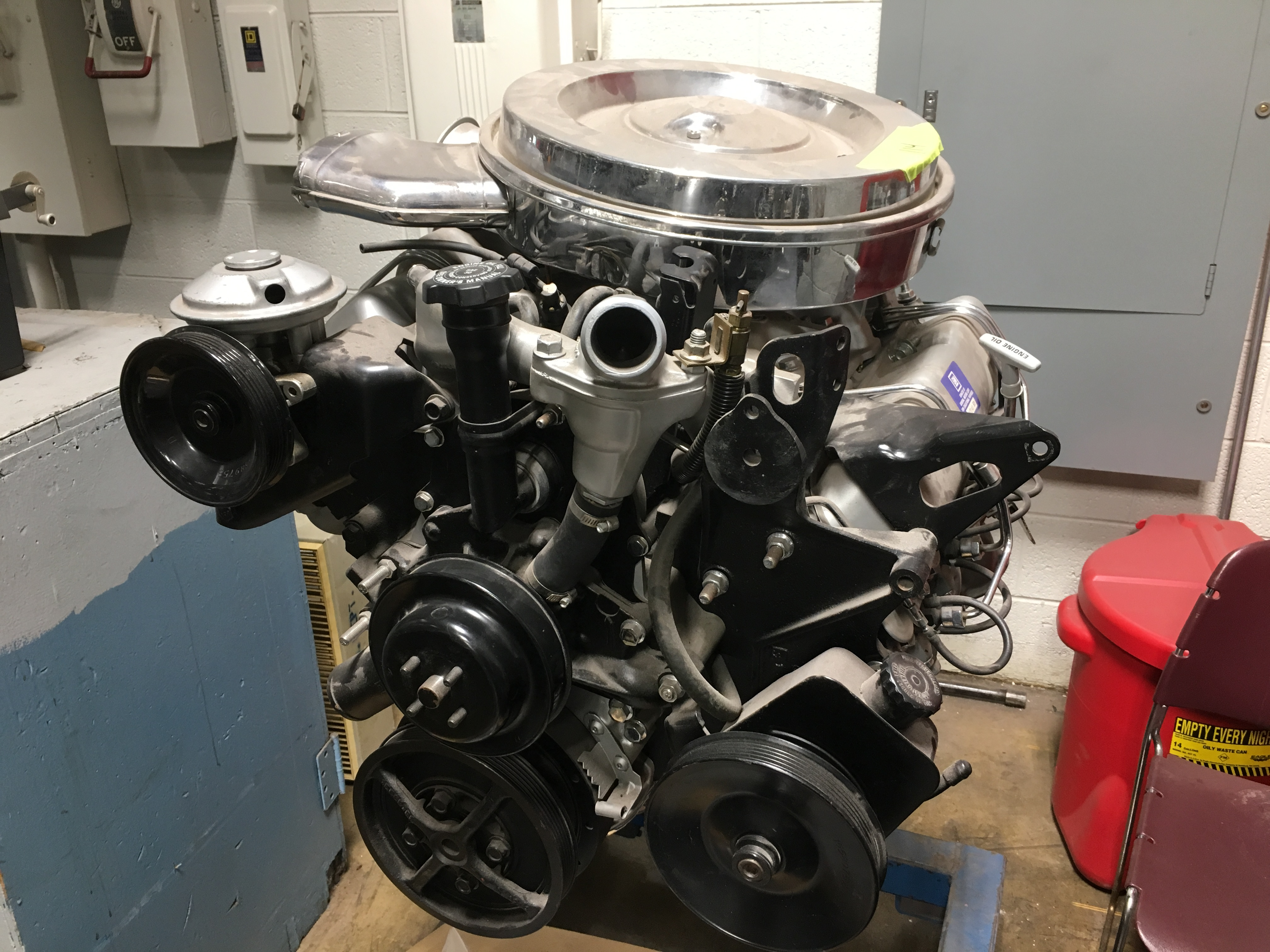

Overview
- Manufacturer: General Motors; AM General
- Also called: AM General Optimizer 6500
- Production: 1981 (limited); 1982–2002; 2000-present (AM General)

Layout
- Configuration: 90° V8
- Displacement: 6.2 L (379 cu in); 6.5 L (395 cu in)
- Cylinder bore: 6.2 L: 3.98 in (101.1 mm); 6.5 L: 4.06 in (103.1 mm)
- Piston stroke: 6.2 L: 3.8 in (96.5 mm); 6.5 L: 3.82 in (97 mm)
- Cylinder block material: Cast iron
- Cylinder head material: Cast iron
- Valvetrain: OHV 2 valves × cyl.
- Compression ratio: 21.5:1, Marine 18.0:1

RPM range
- Idle speed: 550 ± 25
- Max. engine speed: 3,600

Combustion
- Turbocharger: BorgWarner GM-X series (optional on 6.5L only)
- Fuel system: 1993 and older: Mechanical rotary pump 1994 and newer: Electronic rotary pump
- Fuel type: Diesel
- Cooling system: Water-cooled

Output
- Power output: 130–215 hp (97–160 kW)
- Torque output: 240–440 lb⋅ft (325–597 N⋅m)

Emissions
- Emissions control systems: EGR and catalytic converter

Chronology
- Predecessor: Oldsmobile Diesel LF9 350 cu in (5.7 L)
- Successor: Duramax V8 engine

The General Motors–Detroit Diesel V8 engine is a series of diesel V8 engines first introduced by General Motors for their C/K pickup trucks in 1982. Developed in collaboration with GM subsidiary Detroit Diesel, the engine family was produced by GM through 2002, when it was replaced by the new Duramax line. AM General's subsidiary General Engine Products (GEP) still produces a military variant of this engine for the HMMWV.

The General Motors light-truck 6.2L and 6.5L diesel engines were optional in many 1982 through 2002 full-size GM pickups, SUVs, and vans. They were also available in motor homes. The engine was standard on AM General's military HMMWV, civilian Hummer H1, and the 1980s GM military Commercial Utility Cargo Vehicle.

== 6.2L ==
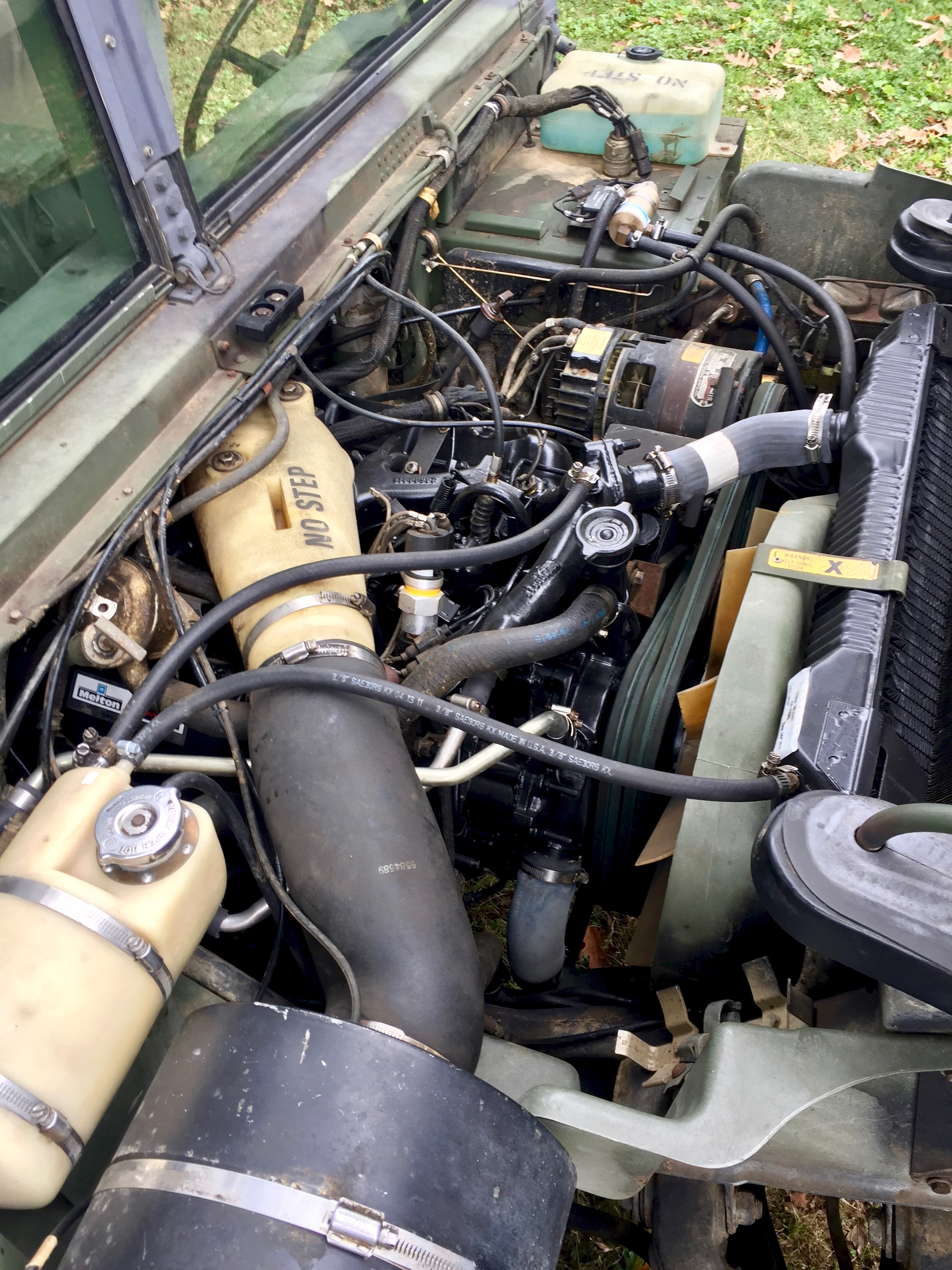
6.2L fitted to a 1987 HMMWV

The original 6.2 L (379 cu in) diesel V8 was introduced in 1982 for the Chevrolet C/K and was produced until 1993. The 6.2L diesel emerged as a high-fuel-economy alternative to the V8 gasoline engine lineup, and achieved better mileage than Chevrolet's 4.3L V6 gasoline engine of the 1980s, at a time when the market was focused on power rather than efficiency. However, it was designed to easily install in place of the gasoline V8, using the same mounting and attachments for transmissions as all GM truck engines. Overall weight for the complete engine is slightly heavier than the 7.4L/454 V8 big-block gasoline engine. There were about 300 6.2L diesel engines which were placed into 2-door cars in 1981, prior to official production. These were then given to the United States government and issued to various federal agencies and military branches. These were used as testbeds regarding long term fuel economy and reliability in cars.

=== Applications ===
- 1982–1993 Chevrolet/GMC C/K 10/1500, 20/2500, 30/3500
- 1982–1991 Chevrolet Suburban/GMC Suburban
- 1992–1993 AM General Hummer H1
- 1982–1993 AM General HMMWV
- GM version of the CUCV
- 1982–1993 Chevrolet/GMC G-series van 20/2500, 30/3500

=== Specifications ===
- Engine RPO codes: LH6 ('C' series, with EGR / EPR) and LL4 ('J' series)
- Displacement: 6.2 L (379 cu in)
- Bore × stroke: 3.98 in × 3.8 in (101.1 mm × 96.5 mm)
- Aspiration: Natural
- Compression: 21.5:1
- Injection: Indirect
- Horsepower and torque (at launch): 130 hp (97 kW) at 3,600 rpm / 240 lb⋅ft (325 N⋅m) at 2,000 rpm
- Horsepower and torque (final): 165 hp (123 kW) at 3,600 rpm / 285 lb⋅ft (386 N⋅m) at 2,000 rpm
- Horsepower and torque (US Army HMMWV model): 185 hp (138 kW) at 3,600 rpm / 330 lb⋅ft (447 N⋅m) at 2,100 rpm
- Redline: 3,600 rpm
- Idle RPMs: 550 ± 25

== 6.5L ==
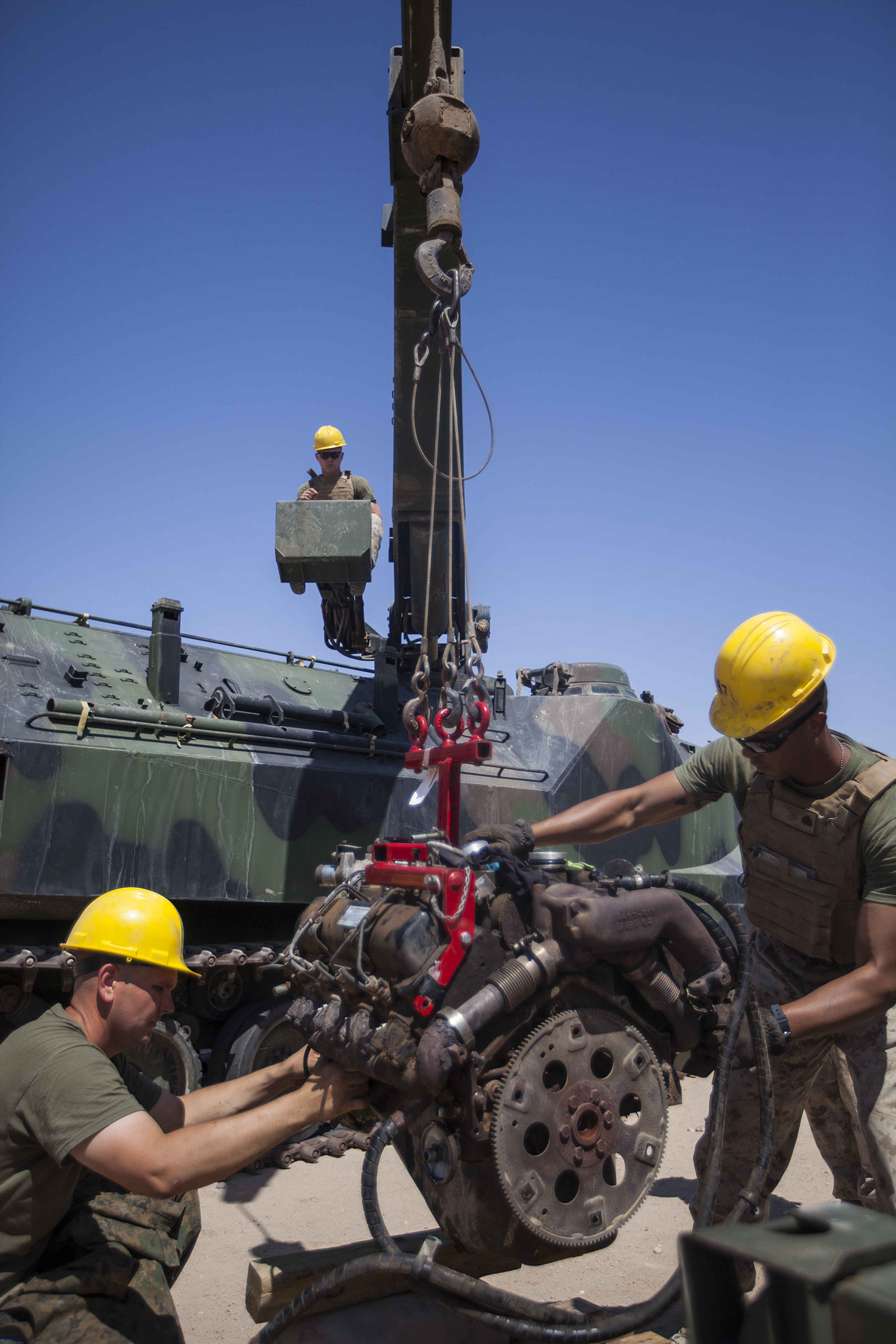
22nd MEU marines extract a 6.5L V8 from a HMMWV (2014)

The 6.5 L (395 cu in) version was introduced in 1992 to replace the 6.2. Most 6.5s were equipped with a turbocharger. This engine was never meant to be a power and torque competitor with Ford/International and Dodge/Cummins, but rather a simply designed workhorse engine that made credible power, achieved decent fuel economy, and met emission standards in half-ton trucks. The Duramax 6600 replaced the 6.5 in light trucks beginning in 2001 and the C3500HD medium duty cab and chassis (replaced by the C4500 Kodiak/TopKick) and vans beginning in 2003, but the 6.5 (6500 Optimizer) is still produced by AM General for the HMMWV.

There are several GM 6.5-liter diesel engine production options. The turbocharged L56 (VIN "S") was used in 1/2-ton and light-duty 3/4-ton. Heavy-duty 3/4-ton and 1-ton trucks used the turbocharged L65 (VIN "F") engine. The L56 is emissions controlled with EGR and catalytic converters. The L65, up to at least 1999, has a catalytic converter(soot trap/DOC) but no EGR. GM was the first manufacturer to introduce an electronically controlled fuel injection system into a diesel pickup truck. The L49 (VIN "P") and L57 (VIN "Y") are both naturally aspirated engines. L57 is listed as HO or Heavy Duty. Additional RPO codes are LQM 175 hp (130 kW) and LQN 190 hp (142 kW).

Changes were made by GM to the 6.5 in their light trucks for emissions or reliability improvement. The 1992–1993 model years used a 6.5-specific Stanadyne DB-2 mechanical injection pump. GM replaced the DB-2 with the electronic throttle DS-4 in 1994–2000 vehicles. In mid-1996, GM implemented a redesigned engine cooling system incorporating twin non bypass-blocking thermostats and a 130-U.S.-gallon-per-minute (490-liter-per-minute) water pump. This improved the flow through the block by 70–75% and flow to the radiator 7%.

=== Applications ===
Turbocharged:

- 1994–1999 Chevrolet Blazer/Tahoe/GMC Yukon (2-door 4×4 models only) (light-duty)
- 1994–1998 Chevrolet C/K 1500 and 2500 (light-duty)
- 1994–1999 Chevrolet/GMC/Holden Suburban (heavy-duty)
- 1992–2000 Chevrolet/GMC C/K 2500 and 3500 (heavy-duty)
- 2001–2002 Chevrolet/GMC C3500HD (heavy-duty)
- 1996–2002 Chevrolet Express/GMC Savana 2500 and 3500 (heavy-duty)

Naturally aspirated:

- 1994–1996 AM General Hummer H1 (also used the turbocharged version)
- 1994–present AM General HMMWV (also used the turbocharged version)
- 1994–1996 Chevrolet and GMC G20 and G30 vans (naturally aspirated)
- 1999–2005 Workhorse Custom Chassis (light- and medium-duty forward-control chassis): P42 Commercial, P32 Motorhome (also turbocharged on some versions)

=== Specifications ===
- Engine RPO codes: L49, L56, L57, L65, LQM, and LQN.
- Displacement: 395 cu in (6.5 L)
- Bore × stroke: 4.06 in × 3.82 in (103.1 mm × 97.0 mm)
- Aspiration: Turbocharged (BorgWarner GM-X series). Also available naturally aspirated.
- Compression: GM early 21.3:1, GM late 20.3:1, AMG/GEP marine 18.0:1
- Injection: Indirect
- Horsepower/torque (lowest): 160 hp (119 kW) at 3,600 rpm / 290 lb⋅ft (393 N⋅m) at 1,700 rpm (naturally aspirated)
- Horsepower/torque (highest): 215 hp (160 kW) at 3,200 rpm / 440 lb⋅ft (597 N⋅m) at 1,800 rpm (turbocharged)
- Redline: 3,600 rpm

== Fuel system ==
Diesel 6.2L Exhaust

The fuel system is a very simple design. A mechanical or electric fuel lift pump feeds a Stanadyne rotary distributor injection pump at low pressure. The distributor injection pump controls both metering, via an internal centrifugal governor, and high pressure fuel delivery to the fuel injectors via internal precision hydraulic pumps. Near the top of the compression stroke, fuel is atomized at high pressure into a hemispherical Inconel prechamber in the cylinder heads using Bosch pintle and seat mechanical fuel injectors. This is called indirect injection. GM used fully mechanical DB2 series injection pumps on all military HMMWVs and 1982–1993 6.2s and 6.5s. From 1994 until end of production, GM used the electronically controlled Stanadyne DS4 series of injection pumps in its light trucks. A mechanical DB4 series injection pump can be found on some 6.5L marine engines.

== Common problems ==
- Main bearing web crack: In both 6.2L and 6.5L engines, this is reportedly fixed with a combination of improved higher nickel cast iron alloy and lower block re-design including, but not limited to, a main bearing girdle. These features are in the new-for-2007 AM General GEP P400 6500 Optimizer enhanced 6.5L diesel presently being sold to the U.S. government for the 6-ton armored HMMWV.
- Crank failure: Related to age failures of the harmonic balancer, the vibration-dampened accessory drive pulley, or the dual-mass flywheel.
- Pump mounted driver: Relates to thermal failures. The PMD is screwed to the DS-4 injection pump on the 1994–2002 6.5L diesel utilizing fuel flow to dissipate heat. The injection pump is mounted in the intake valley (a high heat area). The PMD contains two power transistors that should be cooled by proper contact with the injection pump body. If the pump is not precisely machined to make complete contact with the transistors via the silicone thermal gasket and paste, the PMD is improperly installed without the gasket or paste, the PMD is installed off center with the pump body, or corrosion develops on the mounting surface the PMD will overheat. Several companies manufacture an extension harness and heat-sink kits. These allow an owner or a mechanic to relocate the PMD away from the injection pump to a lower-heat environment or a place that can get more air flow.
- Cylinder head cracking: Higher-mileage 6.5 engines can exhibit stress related fractures in the cylinder head bowl. Stronger cylinder heads remedy this problem.
- Oil cooler line failure: Stock 1990s GM oil cooler lines are held together by a C-clip at the engine block and since the engine has no low oil pressure shutoff switch, if one clip fails, the engine loses its oil and seizes. Aftermarket oil cooler lines that utilize compression fittings rectify this.
