= Armet (disambiguation) =

Armet, a type of combat helmet which was developed in the 15th century

Armet may also refer to:

== People ==
=== Given name ===
- Armet Francis (born 1945), Jamaican-born photographer and publisher

=== Surname ===
- Emile Armet de Lisle (1853–1928), French industrialist and chemist
- Francisco Armet (1892–1973), Spanish footballer
- Juan Armet (1895–1956), Spanish footballer
- Louis Armet (1914–1981), American architect

== Other uses ==
- ARMET, mutated in early-stage tumors
- Armet Armored Vehicles, a defunct vehicle manufacturer founded and formerly headquartered in King City, Ontario
- Armet Davis Newlove Architects, a Californian architectural firm

== See also ==
- Armes (disambiguation)
- Armen (disambiguation)
