= Arm (disambiguation) =

An arm is an upper limb of the body.

Arm, arm, or ARM may also refer to:

== Geography ==
- Arm, Mississippi, an unincorporated community in the United States
- Arm (geography), a narrow stretch of a larger body of water
  - Distributary or arm, a subsidiary branch of a river
- Arm River (disambiguation), several rivers and locations
- "Arm of Finland" (Suomen käsivarsi), a widely known geographical nickname for the municipality of Enontekiö
- Armenia (ISO 3166-1 alpha-3 and UNDP code: ARM)
- County Armagh, Northern Ireland (Chapman code: ARM)

== Science and medicine ==
- Anorectal malformation, a birth defect in which the rectum is malformed
- Aldo-keto reductase family 1, member A1, an enzyme

== Technology ==
- Asteroid Redirect Mission, a proposed NASA mission
- Atmospheric Radiation Measurement, a program of the United States Department of Energy
- Advanced Robotics for Manufacturing, an American consortium (founded 2017)

=== Computing ===
- Arm Holdings, a British multinational company that designs the Arm computer processors
  - ARM architecture family, a RISC instruction set family
  - List of ARM processors
- Application Response Measurement, an open standard for diagnosing performance bottlenecks
- Abstract rewriting machine, a virtual machine
- Arm (software), a CLI status monitor for Tor

=== Weaponry ===
- Armament, any implement or device that is used to deter, threaten, inflict physical damage, harm, or kill
  - Firearm, a portable gun
- Anti-radiation missile, a missile designed to detect and home in on an enemy radio emission source

== Fiction ==
- ARM (film), a 2024 Indian film
- ARM (novella), a novella by Larry Niven
  - Amalgamated Regional Militia, a fictional group from Larry Niven's Known Space universe
- Armageddon (MUD), or Arm, a text-based online role-playing game
- ARM, a faction in Chris Taylor's video game Total Annihilation

== Organizations and movements ==
- Africa Reparations Movement, a British organization advocating reparations for slavery (1993–2000)
- African Rainbow Minerals, a mining company based in South Africa
- African Resistance Movement, an anti-apartheid movement in South Africa in the 1960s
- Afrikaner Weerstandsbeweging (English: Afrikaner Resistance Movement)
- Animal Rights Militia, a banner used by animal rights activists
- ARM Cement Limited, a mining and manufacturing company in Kenya
- Army of the Republic of Macedonia, now Army of the Republic of North Macedonia
- Associação dos Radioamadores de Macau, an amateur radio organization in Macao
- Asociația Radioamatorilor din Moldova, an amateur radio organization in Moldova
- Association of Radical Midwives, a British organisation for midwives
- Association of Railway Museums, an organization in North America
- Association of Recovering Motorcyclists, an international motorcycle association
- Australian Republican Movement, a lobby group that promotes changing Australia to a republic
- Autism rights movement, a social movement

== Other uses ==
- Arm (dominoes), a line of dominoes with one open end
- Adjustable-rate mortgage, a type of mortgage loan
- Armada República Mexicana, a ship prefix of the Mexican Navy
- American Racing Manual, a publication covering Thoroughbred horse racing in the United States
- Armadale railway station, Melbourne
- AR Murugadoss, also known as ARM, an Indian filmmaker
- Armenian language (ISO 639-2 code)
- Argentine peso moneda nacional, a former currency of Argentina (ISO 4217 code: ARM)
- Armidale Airport, Australia (IATA code: ARM)

== See also ==
- Lever arm, a concept used in the calculation of torque, the rotational analogue of linear force
- Arms (disambiguation)
- Arming (disambiguation)
