= Emergency Task Force (Toronto Police Service) =

Toronto Police Service tactical unit

- Active: 1965-Present
- Country: Canada
- Agency: Toronto Police Service
- Type: Police tactical unit
- Role: Law enforcement; Counter-terrorism

Website
- https://www.tps.ca/organizational-chart/specialized-operations-command/public-safety-operations/specialized-emergency-response/emergency-task-force/

The Emergency Task Force (ETF) is the police tactical unit of the Toronto Police Service. Created in 1965, it is mandated to deal with high-risk situations like hostage-taking, emotionally disturbed persons, high-risk arrests, warrant service, protection details, and crowd control. The Emergency Task Force is also responsible for responding to any terrorist incidents that occur throughout the City of Toronto.

The ETF is under the command of the Specialized Operations Command under Public Safety Operations, Specialized Emergency Response.

== History ==
The Emergency Task Force was created in 1965 after being known as the Riot and Emergency Squad which dealt with riots and crowd control issues. Over the years the unit has grown considerably and crowd control has been undertaken by the Public Safety Unit which falls under the control of the Public Safety and Emergency Management command.

== Organization ==
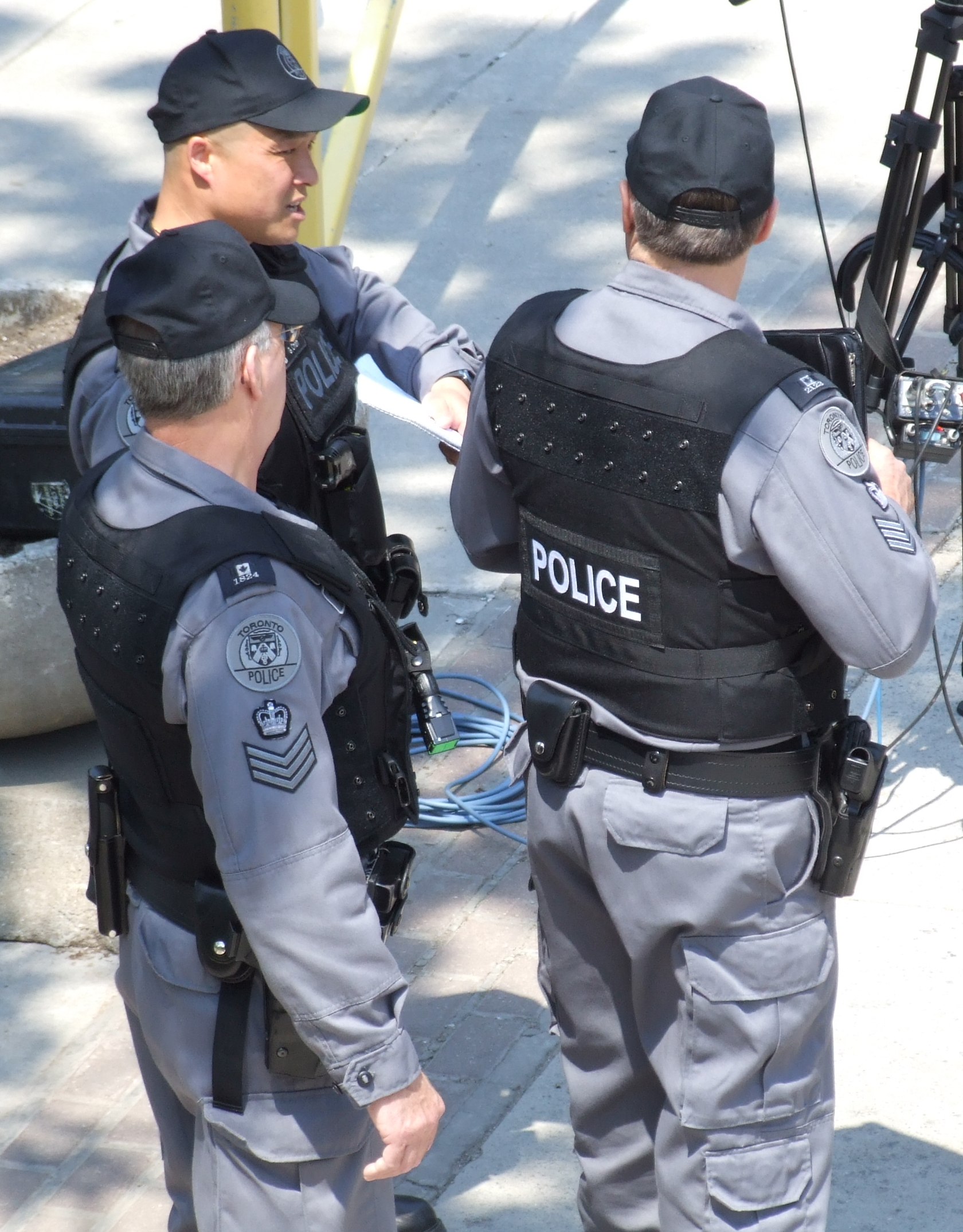
Officers of the ETF in 2007

The Emergency Task Force currently comprises 82 officers from all units who are tactically trained. There are seven Special Weapons Teams consisting of 10 officers each. The teams are on-call 24 hours a day, every day of the week. Each tactical team has a team leader, assaulters, snipers, bomb technicians, and a negotiator. All team members are trained as assaulters, and thus can perform any necessary tasks requiring force.

The negotiation team consists of the two ETF Staff Sergeant supervisors. If a situation is not resolved by a member of a Special Weapons Team, who is a trained negotiator, the negotiation team will be called in to take over the negotiations. In more complex calls involving suicidal, homicidal-suicidal, or violent emotionally disturbed individuals, a forensic psychiatrist, who has been on the negotiation team for the past 22 years, can be called to the scene to advise the negotiators and/or incident commander.

Three of the TPS's specialized units compose the ETF. These include the special weapons teams (tactical), the explosive disposal unit (EDU), and the emergency response unit (ERU). The ERU provides specialized equipment for the ETF, including high-powered lights, crane, and a mobile command post.

The ETF maintains a close working relationship with other police tactical teams of the Greater Toronto Area, including the York Regional Police Emergency Response Unit (ERU), the Durham Regional Police Tactical Support Unit (TSU), and the Peel Regional Police Tactical and Rescue Unit (TRU).

=== Location ===
The unit is located in Toronto, in a 35,000-square-foot (3,300 m^{2}) building that was built in 1989. It contains:

- meeting rooms
- two shooting ranges
- a rappelling tower
- an exercise room
- a large garage to house the unit's specialized vehicles

The teams train at their Don Mills station, as well as at CFB Borden, a Canadian Forces (CF) base approximately an hour and a half drive north of Toronto. The unit also trains with members of the CF's counter-terrorism unit Joint Task Force 2, who are based at the Dwyer Hill Training Facility outside of Ottawa.

== Equipment ==
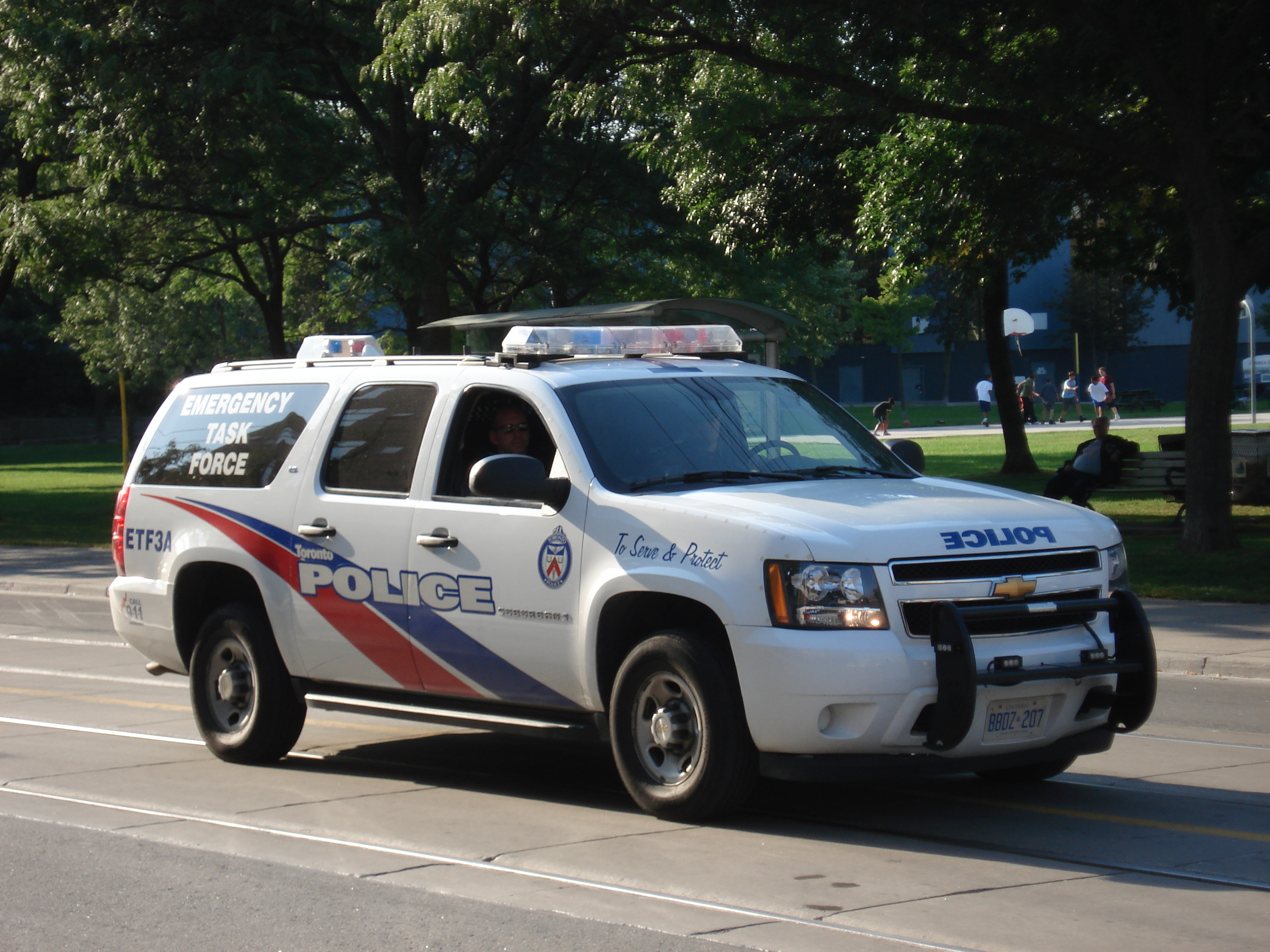
A Chevrolet Suburban of the Emergency Task Force in 2008

The ETF uses the MP5A3 sub-machine gun, Remington 700 bolt-action sniper rifle, Remington 870 shotgun, and the Colt Canada MRR carbine, while Glock 17 or 19 handguns are authorized as sidearms. In 2000, the ETF acquired C8 carbines.

Less than lethal options are also at the disposal of team members: these include X26 Tasers, pepper spray (OC Spray) and tear gas (CS Gas), and rubber bullets or bean bag rounds.

ETF also operates Northrop Grumman Remotec Andros MK V1A bomb disposal remote robots to defuse suspected bombs or suspicious objects. The newest robot used by the team is the Remotec Andros F6B.

The vehicles used by the team include the Ford Crown Victoria Police Interceptor, Chevrolet Suburban, Ford Expedition, Ford F150, Ford F550, Ford Explorer and Ford Taurus Police Interceptor. They also have a number of Chevrolet express vans as RDVs.

The ETF has been operating an arsenal of armoured vehicles, which provides ETF officers with increased ballistic protection and capabilities. Since the summer of 2005, the ETF has operated the Armet Trooper, which can be used to rescue injured civilians or officers. ETF now operates the Terradyne Armored Vehicles Gurkha specifically the MPV variant which has been modified for ETF usage, replacing the aging Armet Trooper's roles.

Currently, the Toronto Police Service does not have its own helicopter, but they receive air support from various agencies including the York and Durham Regional Police, along with the Ontario Provincial Police (OPP) and the Royal Canadian Mounted Police (RCMP).

== Operational highlights ==
ETF responded to an operation that involved resolving a hostage-taking situation on December 31, 1999. A man took a doctor at St Michael's Hospital hostage, holding the doctor at gunpoint. The incident ended when two ETF officers fired three shots, killing the man.

ETF responded to an operation that involved resolving a hostage-taking situation on August 25, 2004. A man with a history of domestic violence took a woman hostage, holding her at gunpoint during morning rush hour just outside Union Station in downtown Toronto. The incident ended when an ETF sharpshooter fired a shot, killing the man. The hostage was traumatized but unharmed.

ETF responded to another operation that involved an off-duty 33 Division Officer inside a CIBC bank on Lawrence and Victoria Park. On February 26, 2008, ETF, K-9, and officers from 33 Division were called to a bank robbery in progress. Unknown to the 16-year-old suspect, officers surrounded the bank and waited for the suspect to exit. The suspect left the bank only to be tackled by the off-duty officer and awaiting ETF.

ETF officers were involved with Project Fusion arrests. This was an investigation led by the province of Ontario Guns and Gangs Task Force, whose officers were working hand-in-hand with other services, mainly the Durham Regional Police Drug and Gang Enforcement Units. These arrests happened on the morning of April 1, 2009 and saw over 120 locations raided by not only Toronto Police tactical officers, but also officers from surrounding police services as well from as far away as Belleville and London, Ontario. In total, 38 police tactical units were used for these warrants. The centre of the raids were in the Markham and Eglinton and 400/410 McCowan Road area, but also included locations in Peel and York Region, along with several locations in Durham Region.

The ETF responded to a call on board a TTC bus in which an emotionally disturbed person tried to hijack the bus at knifepoint on August 2, 2016. The ETF and their psychiatrist negotiated with the man for over five hours and were successful in getting him to surrender; they were highly praised by the media for taking the time to resolve the scene peacefully.

The ETF was serving a search warrant at an apartment building in North York on June 11, 2026. The warrant was in relation to a shooting at the US Consulate Building back in March. While serving the warrant, 19-year-old Nicholas Bennett shot and killed ETF officer Constable Marc Pinizzotto, a 43-year-old officer who had been serving with the Toronto Police Service for 18 years. Bennett was shot by police in the exchange of gunfire and was transported the hospital in critical condition. Toronto Police and the Pinizzotto family received an outpouring of support from numerous politicians and law enforcement officials from across Canada and the United States.

== In popular culture ==
The Canadian television series Flashpoint, which aired in both Canada and the United States from 2008 to 2012, focused on a fictional version of the ETF called the "Strategic Response Unit" (SRU).

== See also ==
- ERT (Royal Canadian Mounted Police)
