= Arming =

Arming may refer to:

- The act of taking up firearms
- Arming (ships), the preparing of vessels for the sea
- Armings, another term for waist clothes

== See also ==
- Arms (disambiguation)
