= Pennsylvania Trolley Museum =

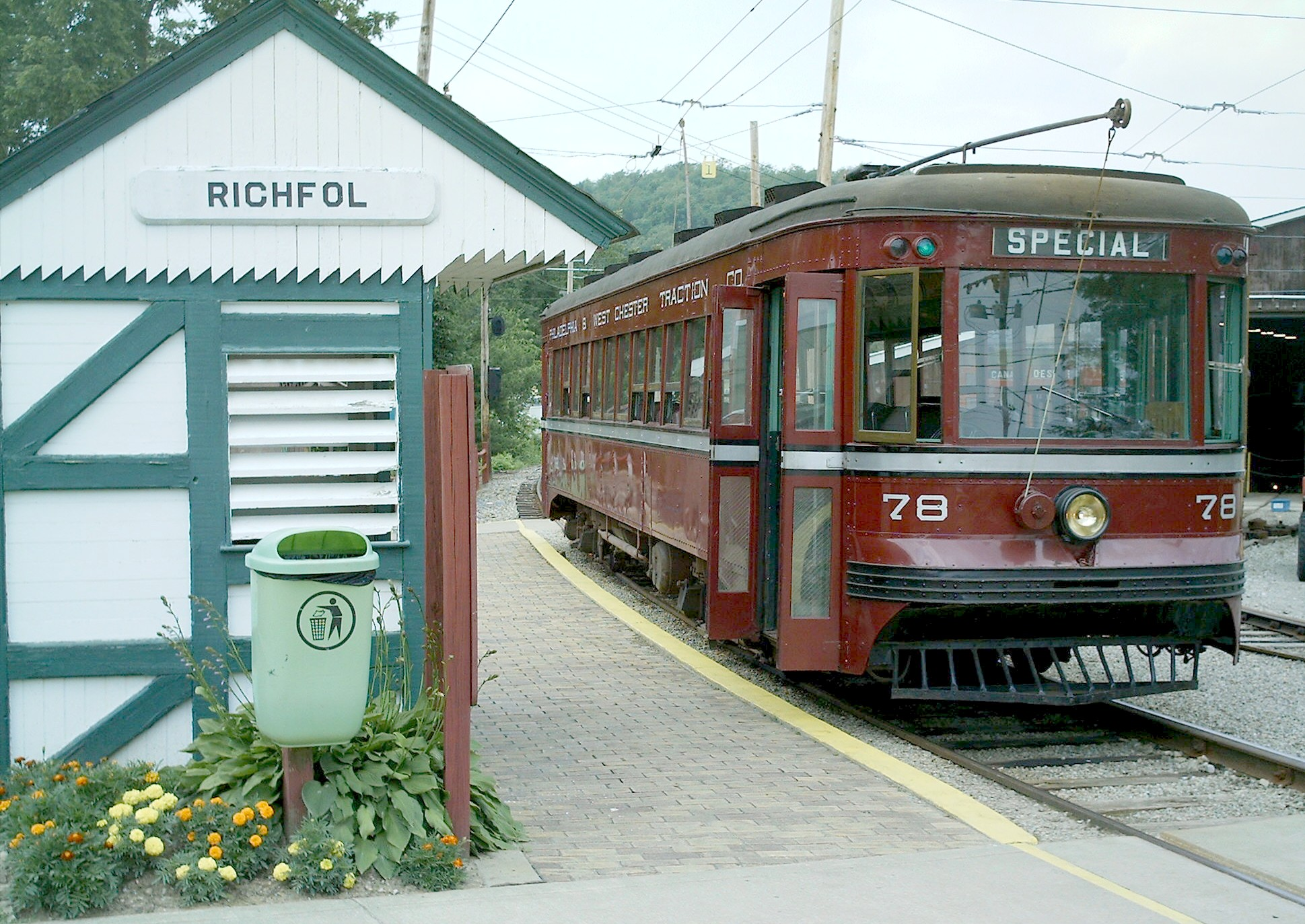
- Philadelphia and West Chester Traction Car 78 waits to pick up passengers at the museum
- Established: 1953
- Location: 1 Electric Way, Washington, Pennsylvania
- Coordinates: 40.21134°N 80.24609°W
- Type: Railway museum
- Website: http://www.pa-trolley.org/

The Pennsylvania Trolley Museum is a museum in Washington, Pennsylvania, dedicated to the operation and preservation of streetcars and trolleys. The museum primarily contains historic trolleys from Pennsylvania, but its collection includes examples from nearby Toledo, New Orleans, and even an open-sided car from Brazil. Many have been painstakingly restored to operating condition. Other unique cars either awaiting restoration or that are incompatible with the 5' 2-1/2" Pennsylvania trolley gauge track are on display in a massive trolley display building. Notable examples of static display include a J.G. Brill “Brilliner” car (which had been introduced as a competitor to the PCC streetcar), locomotives, and a horse car from the early days of Pittsburgh’s public transit systems.

== History ==
The origin of the museum can be traced to a group of electric railway enthusiasts who in 1949 acquired Pittsburgh Railways Company M-1, a small four-wheel Pittsburgh trolley. It and Pittsburgh Railways Company 3756 (a single-end low-floor car) and West Penn Railways Company 832 were stored for the group until 1954 in Ingram Car House by Pittsburgh Railways.

In 1953, the Pittsburgh Railways Interurban line from Pittsburgh to Washington had been abandoned and the newly formed Pittsburgh Electric Railway Club bought 2,000 feet (610 m) of the line north of Washington in Chartiers Township next to the former County Home trolley stop. On February 7, 1954, the three trolleys stored in Pittsburgh were run to the museum site under their power. On the founding day, the operation of the cars was enjoyed by supporters, making this the first trolley museum operation in Pennsylvania. In subsequent months the interurban line was dismantled back to the Drake stop in Upper St. Clair. Pittsburgh Railways Company #4393 (now in the museum's collection) returned riders to Pittsburgh, becoming the last revenue passenger service on the line.

The Arden Trolley Museum opened to the public in June 1963 following a period of restoration and construction of a power station and carbarn.

== Preservation ==
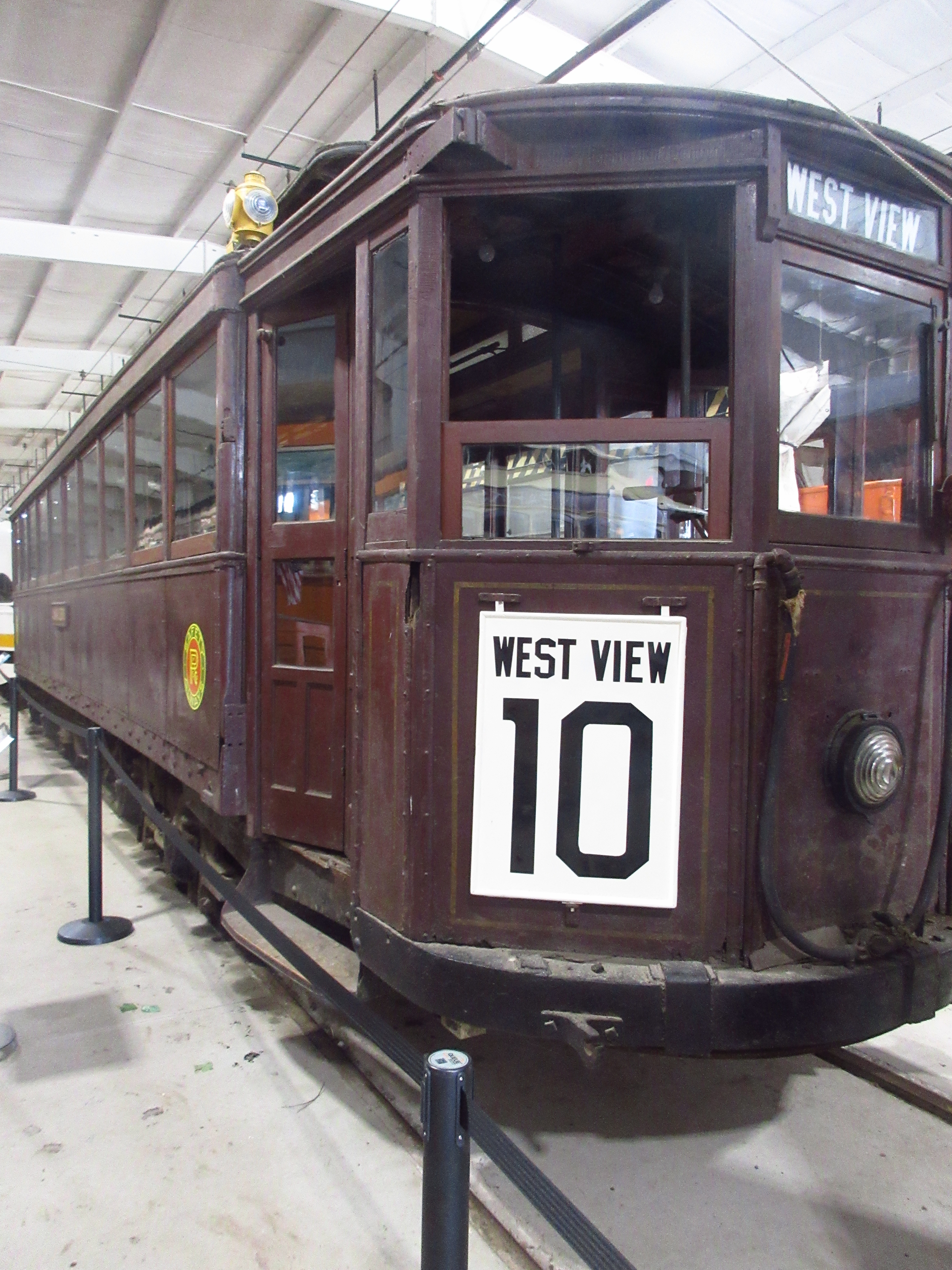
Car No. 3487, built in 1905 and utilized by the Pittsburgh Railways Co, is one of the oldest pieces of rolling stock in the collection.

The museum's website states that the mission is "... to communicate the story of Pennsylvania's Trolley Era to a diverse audience through the preservation, interpretation, and use of its collection of electric railway and railroad equipment."

To that end, the museum includes a collection of 51 street and electric railway vehicles in various conditions. Featured in the museum collection is New Orleans streetcar #832, built by the Perley Thomas Company (High Point, North Carolina) in 1923. This car was formerly used on various lines in New Orleans, including the Desire line, which had been made famous in the play by Tennessee Williams: A Streetcar Named Desire. When the play opened on Broadway, Car #832 appeared in an article in the December 15, 1947, issue of Life magazine.

Added in 2023 was the Terrible Trolley that celebrated the successes of Pittsburgh's professional football team, the Pittsburgh Steelers. Former PCC #1713 will be painted in the team's black and gold colors.

The original museum operating line consisted of a one-half-mile section of the abandoned Pittsburgh Railways' Washington interurban line, which until 1953 connected to Pittsburgh via the route that still serves sections of Bethel Park. The Richfol shelter at Car House No. 1 came from the Richfol Stop, which had been located at the north end of Canonsburg on the Pittsburgh Railways Interurban line from Pittsburgh to Washington.

The museum line was extended north along the track bed of the abandoned Pennsylvania Railroad branch to the Arden Mines. Between 1979 and 1995, museum volunteers constructed a new track (5' 2-1/2" gauge) along this right of way to a location near the former coal mining town. This added 1 mile (1.6 km) to the track and allowed stations to be opened at the County Fairground and Arden Mines, where a loop track was constructed, simplifying the operation of cars. In 2004, the original museum track was extended along the original interurban route to a point near North Main Street and Country Club Road. At this site another loop (McClane School Loop) was constructed, making possible the continuous operation of single-ended trolleys.

In September 2004, the area surrounding the museum flooded in the wake of Hurricane Ivan. The floodwaters caused substantial damage to the museum; it has since been repaired.

The 28,000 sq. ft. Trolley Display Building opened to the public in May 2005, allowing the museum to display approximately 30 cars from their collection. Besides putting more of the collection on display, it keeps the historic trolleys undercover and out of the elements. Tracks connecting to the Trolley Display Building were opened in 2008.

In November 2023, the new Welcome & Education Center opened to the public on Electric Way, a half-mile from the old Visitor Center and car barns on Museum Road. The new facility is home to interactive exhibits, theater space and meeting rooms, restrooms, and a gift shop.

== Events ==
The Pennsylvania Trolley Museum participates in the annual Washington County Fair by providing trolley rides from nearby parking lots to the fairgrounds.

A special ride during the Christmas season includes a visit from Santa Claus. Following the advent of the Santa Special, the museum has added events for Easter (Bunny Trolley) and a fall-season Pumpkin Patch Trolley.

The museum appeared in a 1984 episode of Mister Rogers' Neighborhood, where host Fred Rogers takes a ride on and operates Philadelphia streetcar #5326.

The museum hosted the 2007 conference for the Association of Railway Museums. The conference was held on October 3–7, 2007, and was supported by a grant from the Pennsylvania Historical and Museum Commission.
