= Arm River =

Arm River may refer to:

== Rivers ==
- Arm River (Saskatchewan), Saskatchewan
- Arm River (Tasmania), a tributary of Mersey River (Tasmania), Australia

== Places ==
- Rural Municipality of Arm River No. 252, a rural municipality in Saskatchewan
- Arm River (electoral district), a provincial electoral district in Saskatchewan
- Arm River-Watrous, a provincial electoral district in Saskatchewan
- Regina—Arm River, the former name of the federal electoral district Regina—Lumsden—Lake Centre, Saskatchewan

== See also ==
- Arm (disambiguation)
