= Armes (surname) =

Armes is a surname. Notable people with the name include:

- Don Armes (born 1961), American politician
- Edward J Armes (1923–2024), United States Navy officer
- Ethel Armes (1876–1945), American journalist and historian
- George Augustus Armes (1844–1919), United States Army officer
- Ivan Armes (1924–2015), British footballer
- Jay J. Armes (1932–2024), American amputee and actor (Note: Born as surname "Armas")
- John Armes (born 1955), Scottish bishop
- Ray Armes (born 1951), British racing driver
- Sammy Armes (1908–58), English footballer
- Steven Armes, British professor
- Sybil Leonard Armes (1914–2007), Baptist author and musician
- Teo Armes, born 1977 Norwich
