= Wentzville Assembly =

General Motors automobile factory

- Operated: 1983–present
- Location: 1500 East Route A; Wentzville, Missouri, United States
- Coordinates: 38°49′N 90°49′W
- Industry: Automotive
- Products: Automobiles
- Employees: 4,114 (2023)
- Area: 440 acres (1.8 km^{2})
- Volume: 4,250,000 sq ft (395,000 m^{2})
- Owner: General Motors
- Website: gm.com/company/facilities/wentzville

Wentzville Assembly is an automotive assembly plant in Wentzville, Missouri, United States, owned and operated by General Motors. The plant currently assembles the Chevrolet Colorado and GMC Canyon midsize pickup trucks, and Chevrolet Express and GMC Savana full-size vans, for the North American market. Opened in 1983, the 3.7 million square foot plant sits on 569 acres approximately 40 miles west of St. Louis, just off of I-70.

With a similar floor plan to its contemporaries, Michigan's Orion Assembly and Detroit/Hamtramck Assembly plants, the facility includes vehicle assembly as well as body stamping facilities. Originally manufacturing full-size Buick, Oldsmobile and Pontiac sedans, the plant assumed operations of the previous St. Louis Truck Assembly which had been in operation since 1920.

== History ==
In 1996, production shifted from manufacturing unibody, front-drive passenger cars to rear-drive, body on frame trucks, GM's full-size Chevrolet Express and GMC Savana cargo vans on the GMT600 platform, previously manufactured at Lordstown Assembly (Ohio) and Flint Assembly (Michigan). The changeover involved completely gutting and revamping the plant to provide robotic body assembly.

The GMT600 vans received a significant revision for the 2003 model year, known internally as the GMT610, which included a new front end, new powertrains ("LS" engines), left hand side cargo doors, and AWD models. In 2014, GM replaced the lighter 1500-series vans with the Chevrolet City Express built by Nissan in Mexico, retaining manufacture of the commercial-grade models in Wentzville.

Also in 2014, Wentzville began manufacturing the Chevrolet Colorado and GMC Canyon, whose predecessors had been manufactured at the shuttered Shreveport Assembly factory in Louisiana.

Wentzville has received numerous quality awards over the years for both the mid size truck and full size van models.

== Vehicles produced ==
=== Current ===
- Chevrolet Colorado 2014–present
- GMC Canyon 2014–present
- Chevrolet Express 1996–present
- GMC Savana 1996–present

=== Past ===
- Buick Electra 1985–1990
- Buick Park Avenue 1991–1994
- Pontiac Bonneville 1989–1993
- Oldsmobile 88 1986–1993
- Oldsmobile 98 1985–1989
- Oldsmobile Touring Sedan 1987–1989
