= Arms =

Arms or ARMS may also refer to:

- Arm or arms, the upper limbs of the body

== People ==
- Adonis Arms (born 1998), American basketball player
- Ida A. T. Arms (1856–1931), American missionary-educator, temperance leader

== Coat of arms or weapons ==
- Armaments or weapons
  - Firearm
- Coat of arms
  - In this sense, "arms" is a common element in pub names

== Enterprises ==
- Amherst Regional Middle School
- Arms Corporation, originally named Dandelion, a defunct Japanese animation studio who operated from 1996 to 2020
- TRIN (finance) or Arms Index, a short-term stock trading index
- Australian Relief & Mercy Services, a part of Youth With A Mission

== Arts and entertainment ==
- ARMS (band), an American indie rock band formed in 2004
- Arms (album), a 2016 album by Bell X1
- "Arms" (song), a 2011 song by Christina Perri from the album lovestrong
- Arms (video game), a 2017 fighting video game for the Nintendo Switch
- ARMS Charity Concerts, a series of charitable rock concerts in support of Action into Research for Multiple Sclerosis in 1983
- Project ARMS, a 1997 Japanese manga series also known as ARMS

== Other uses ==
- Alveolar rhabdomyosarcoma, a form of cancer
- A_{rms}, Amps root mean square, seen in electrical specifications often as the unit of current

== See also ==
- Arm (disambiguation)
- Armes (disambiguation)
- AMRS (disambiguation)
