= MANF =

Protein-coding gene in the species Homo sapiens

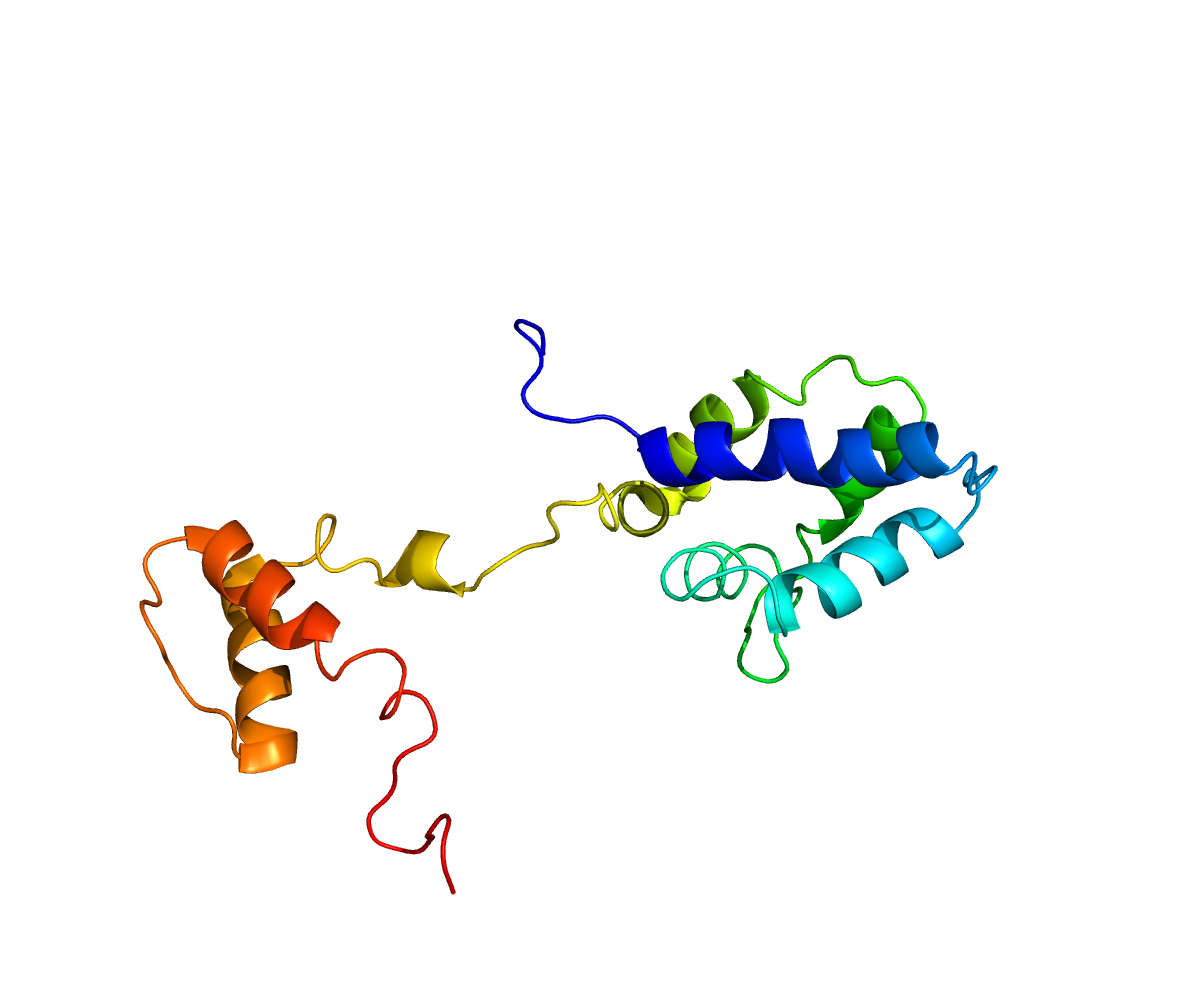

Identifiers
- Aliases: MANF, ARMET, ARP, arginine-rich, mutated in early-stage tumors, arginine-rich protein, mesencephalic astrocyte-derived neurotrophic factor, mesencephalic astrocyte derived neurotrophic factor
- External IDs: OMIM: 601916; MGI: 1922090; GeneCards: MANF
Available structures
PDB	Ortholog search: PDBe RCSB
PDB	List of PDB id codes 2KVD, 2KVE, 2W51

Gene location (Human)
Chr.	Chromosome 3 (human)
Band	3p21.2	Start	51,385,291 bp
Band	3p21.2	End	51,389,397 bp
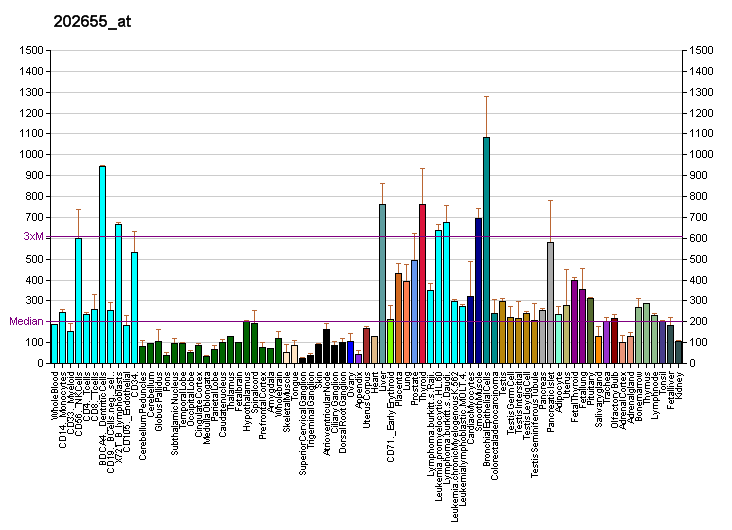
RNA expression pattern
Bgee	Human / Mouse (ortholog); Top expressed in: islet of Langerhans; beta cell; body of pancreas; right lobe of thyroid gland; left lobe of thyroid gland; mucosa of transverse colon; anterior pituitary; left testis; right testis; pericardium / n/a; More reference expression data
BioGPS	More reference expression data
Gene ontology
Molecular function	growth factor activity; RNA binding; lipid binding; sulfatide binding
Cellular component	nucleus; extracellular region; extracellular space; endoplasmic reticulum; cytosol; endoplasmic reticulum lumen; sarcoplasmic reticulum; sarcoplasmic reticulum lumen
Biological process	response to unfolded protein; platelet degranulation; neuron projection development; dopaminergic neuron differentiation; regulation of signaling receptor activity; regulation of response to endoplasmic reticulum stress; signal transduction
Sources:Amigo / QuickGO
Orthologs
Databases	NCBI: entry; OMA: entry
Species	Human	Mouse
Entrez	7873	74840
Ensembl	ENSG00000145050	ENSMUSG00000032575
UniProt	P55145	Q9CXI5
RefSeq (mRNA)	NM_006010	NM_029103
RefSeq (protein)	NP_006001	n/a
Location (UCSC)	Chr 3: 51.39 – 51.39 Mb	n/a
PubMed search
- Wikidata
View/Edit Human	View/Edit Mouse

Mesencephalic astrocyte-derived neurotrophic factor (MANF), Arginine-rich, mutated in early-stage tumors (ARMET), or arginine-rich protein (ARP) is a protein that in humans is encoded by the MANF housekeeping gene.

This gene encodes a highly conserved protein whose function is known. The protein was initially thought to be longer at the N-terminus and to contain an arginine-rich region but transcribed evidence indicates a smaller open reading frame that does not encode the arginine tract. The presence of a specific mutation changing the previously numbered codon 50 from ATG to AGG, or deletion of that codon, has been reported in a variety of solid tumors. With the protein size correction, this codon is now identified as the initiation codon.

MANF has cytoprotective effects in neurons and pancreatic β cells, both in vitro (cell culture) and in vivo (animal models of neurodegeneration and diabetes). Specifically, it protects dopamine neurons from endoplasmic reticulum (ER) stress-induced death. It exerts this action by binding to ERN1, the unfolded protein response (UPR) sensor in the ER, which results in the attenuation of UPR.
