= American Racing Manual =

Series of books covering racing results in the United States

The American Racing Manual (ARM) is an annual publication now published by The Jockey Club, previously by Daily Racing Form Press. It covers Thoroughbred horse racing in the United States. The last DRF-published edition was for 2020. Content of the work covers the previous years racing performances for the United States, thus the 2011 edition covers all racing for 2010. Also included are histories of major stakes races, race records of the year-end champions, a section giving all Hall of Fame horses, information on the Breeder's Cup races, and some information on non-American racing. Statistics on the year's record of every racehorse, racehorse owner, racehorse trainer, and racehorse breeder are also part of the content along with track speed records and world records. Articles about subjects connected with the racing industry as well as analyzing trends and developments from the year are also included.

The Manual was first published in 1906, although earlier predecessors had appeared in the 1890s under the title of The American Sporting Manual. The work was continuously published until 1994, when its format was changed to an abbreviated form. It appeared in that format in 1995 and 1996, and was issued as a CD-ROM version in 1997 and 1998. No 1999 edition appeared, but in 2000 the Daily Racing Form issued a 2000 edition in the old format.

The Manual was considered the "World Almanac" of racing during its earlier publication history. Tom Ainslie, a noted American handicapper, calls the work a "magnificent encyclopedic" work. Although the main publication from 1906 covered only Thoroughbreds, the previous incarnations also included harness racing and other sporting events.

The 2021 edition is now produced by The Jockey Club with information provided, in part, by Daily Racing Form. The publication is available, in PDF form, for free at The Jockey Club website.
