= Ivan Armes =

English footballer

Ivan William Armes (6 April 1924 – 11 November 2015) was an English professional footballer who played for Norwich City and Exeter City as a left half. After leaving Exeter City he was player-coach at Lowestoft Town.

== Sources ==
- Mike Davage, John Eastwood, Kevin Platt (2001). Canary Citizens. Jarrold Publishing. ISBN 0-7117-2020-7.
