= Terradyne Armored Vehicles Gurkha =

Canadian tactical armoured vehicle

Gurkha
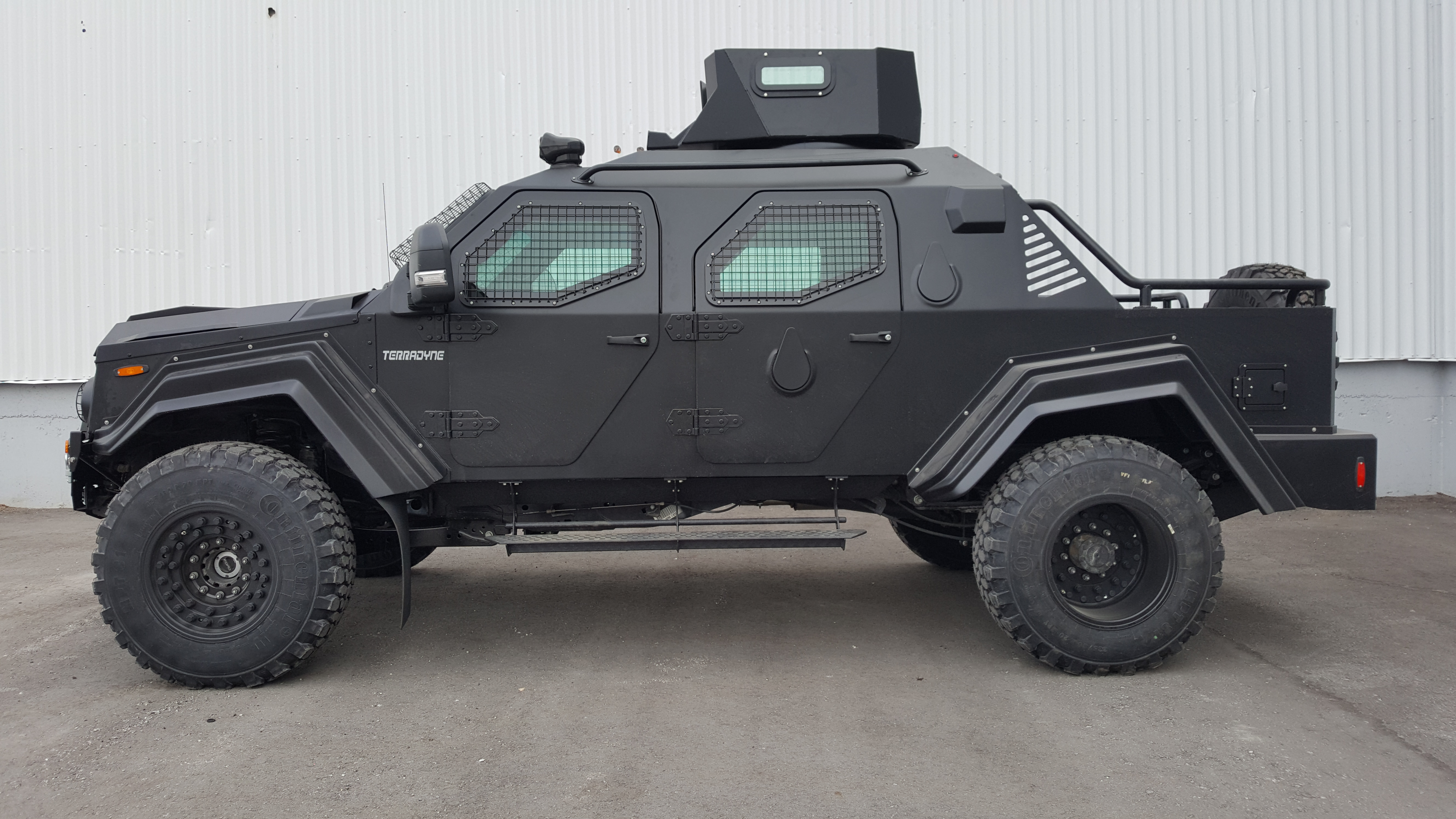
- Gurkha RPV
- Type: Tactical armoured vehicle
- Place of origin: Canada / United States

Service history
- Used by: See Operators

Production history
- Manufacturer: Terradyne Armored Vehicles Inc.
- Produced: 2006–present
- Variants: See variants

Specifications
- Mass: 19,500 lb (8.8 t)
- Length: 250.5 in (6.36 m)
- Width: 101 in (2.6 m)
- Height: 102 in (2.6 m)
- Crew: 2
- Passengers: Up to 12
- Engine: 6.7L V8 turbo diesel 330 hp (250 kW); 825 lb-ft torque
- Transmission: 10 speed automatic
- Ground clearance: 11.5 in (0.29 m) ground to bottom of rear differential case
- Fuel capacity: 40 US gal (150 L; 33 imp gal)
- Maximum speed: 128 km/h (80 mph)

The Terradyne Armored Vehicles Gurkha (or Terradyne Gurkha for short) is a tactical armoured vehicle built by Ontario-based company Terradyne Armored Vehicles Inc. The Gurkha is available in four different variants and are built on a commercial Ford F-550 Super Duty chassis with a turbodiesel V8.

== History ==
The Gurkha was developed in 2005 by Armet Armored Vehicles. In 2011, the Gurkha vehicle design was purchased by Terradyne Armoured Vehicles. The name is a homage to the Gurkhas, ethnic Nepalese soldiers who serve in the British and Indian Armies.

Terradyne was incorporated in August 2011 as a subsidiary of Magna International. In 2014, Terradyne was spun-off as a standalone entity. As of 2026, Teradyne holds both ISO 9000 and 14000 international standards for quality and is registered with the Canadian government's Controlled Goods Program, authorizing the export of military-type vehicles.

Civilian Gurkhas can be Purchased in the U.S. from P1 Miami in Miami, Florida, and directly from Terradyne for Canadian buyers.

Military models include off-road capability, STANAG level 2a mine-blast protection and 50 caliber armor piercing-round protection. Applications include logistics, MANPADS deployment, counter-drone warfare, and troop transport.

== Variants ==
Light Armoured Patrol Vehicle (LAPV)
Application: Border patrol/law enforcement/government agencies/private security/tactical medic vehicle

Multi-purpose Patrol Vehicle (MPV)
Application: Purpose built for government and law enforcement agencies only

Rapid Patrol Vehicle (RPV)
Application: Critical infrastructure protection/law enforcement/government agencies/military/border patrol

Civilian Limited Edition Vehicle (CLEV)
Application: Company PR vehicle/daily driver/rolling panic room/executive protection/offroad vehicle/hobby vehicle

== Operators ==
=== Current ===
Norway

In use by Oslo Police District, and their Delta unit.

Canada

- Alberta
- British Columbia: Used by Victoria Police Department
- Manitoba: Used by Winnipeg Police Service
- Nova Scotia: Purchased by the Halifax Police Service. Announced to be delayed due to COVID-19 on May 11, 2020. Contract canceled as of June 2020.
- Ontario: Halton Regional Police, Ontario Provincial Police, Guelph Police Service, York Regional Police, Toronto Police Service, Niagara Regional Police, London Police Service, Hamilton Police Service and Bruce Power.
- Saskatchewan: Used by Regina Police Service.

Croatia

- Lučko Anti-Terrorist Unit

Estonia

- Bank of Estonia (Eesti Pank)
- Estonian Police (Eesti Politsei)

Libya

- United Nations Development Programme (PMO)

Mexico

- Fuerza Civil: Nuevo León State Police, known as Fuerza Civil (Civil Force)
- Fuerza Civil: Veracruz (Civil Force)
- Guadalupe SSP
- GROMS Policia Saltillo: Grupo de Reacción Operativa, known as GROMS in Saltillo
- Tamaulipas State Police

Nigeria

- Nigeria Police Force

Qatar

- Counter-Terrorism Battalion

Rojava
US-led international coalition to counter ISIS provided the Kurdish-led Syrian Democratic Forces with Gurkha vehicles to be used in Raqqa offensive against ISIS.

Singapore

- Singapore Police Force: Gurkha Contingent.

Saudi Arabia

- Ministry of Interior

Ukraine

- Armed Forces of Ukraine — 13 vehicles on 2023

United States

- Arizona
- California
- Colorado: Used by Boulder Police Department.
- Florida
- New York
- Oklahoma
- Tennessee
- Texas
- Virginia
  - Arlington County Police Department
  - Metropolitan Washington Airports Authority Police Department
- Wisconsin

=== Former operators ===
Australia

- Victoria Police Special Operations Group: Known as the Armet Balkan Mk7 tactical response vehicle. Replaced in April 2013 by the Lenco BearCat.

Canada

- Nova Scotia: Purchased by the Halifax Police Service. Announced to be delayed due to COVID-19 on May 11, 2020. Contract canceled as of June 2020.

== Appearances ==
The Gurkha was featured in the 2011 film Fast Five.

The Gurkha also makes its first official game debut in Forza Horizon 2 as the LAPV variant (not counting fictional models, like the HVY Insurgent from Grand Theft Auto V), which was based on the Gurkha.

The Gurkha appears in the TV series S.W.A.T as "Black Betty", a vehicle used in most episodes for transport of the team.
