= Chevrolet Express =

Chevrolet Express GMC Savana
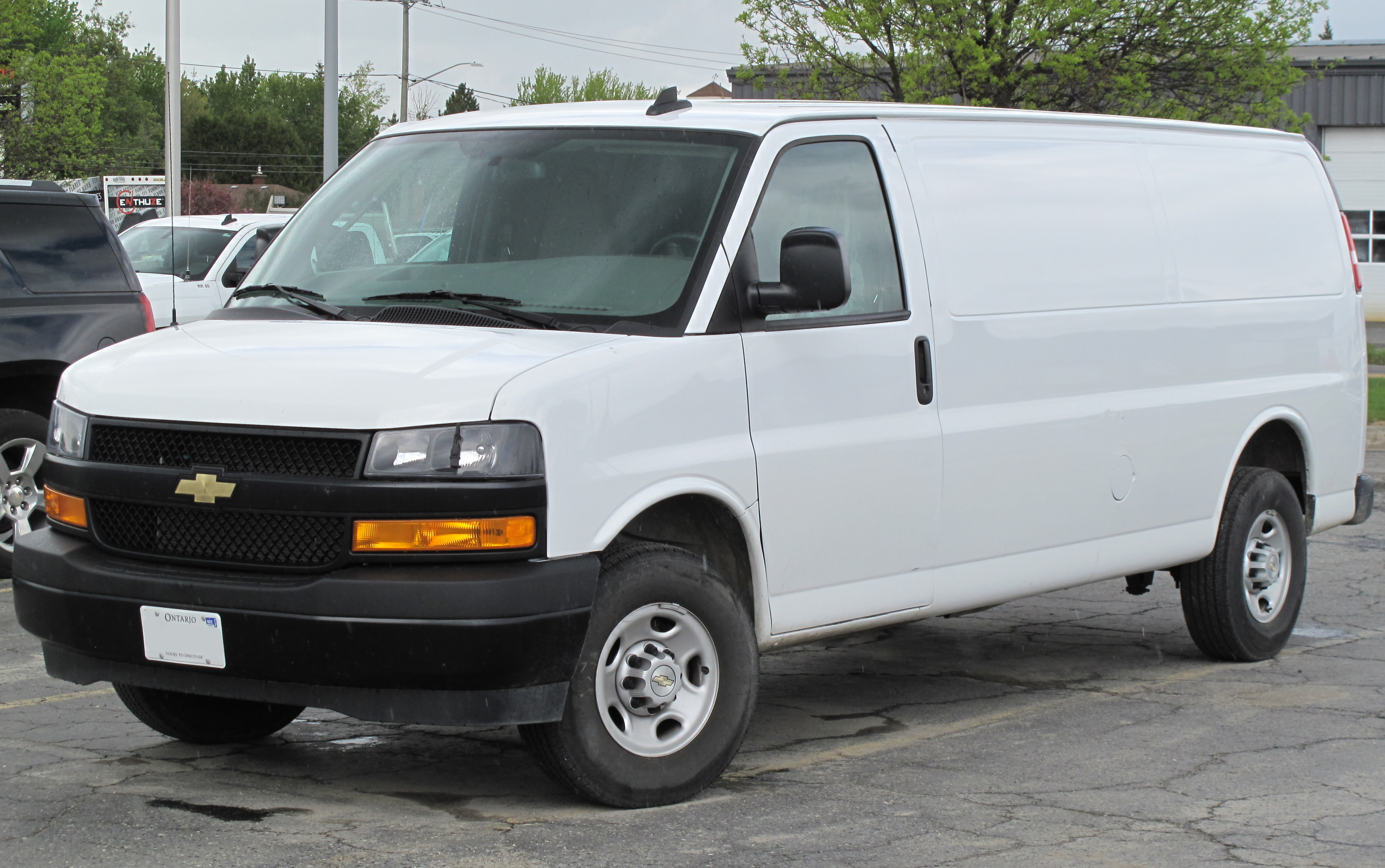
- 2021 Chevrolet Express 2500 cargo van

Overview
- Manufacturer: General Motors
- Also called: GMC Savana; Chevrolet Van (1996–1998; cargo van); Chevrolet Savana (Israel and the Philippines)
- Production: January 1996–present
- Model years: 1996–present
- Assembly: United States: Wentzville, Missouri (Wentzville Assembly); Springfield, Ohio (Navistar; 2017–2026) (cutaway)

Body and chassis
- Class: Full-size van
- Body style: 2-door cutaway van chassis 3-door cargo van 3-door passenger van 4-door cargo van 4-door passenger van
- Layout: Front-engine, rear-wheel drive Front-engine, all-wheel drive (2003–2014)
- Platform: GMT600 (1996–2002); GMT610 (2003–present)
- Chassis: Body-on-frame (ladder); boxed frame rails
- Related: Chevrolet C/K (GMT400); Chevrolet Silverado (GMT800); Chevrolet Kodiak/GMC TopKick (GMT560)

Powertrain
- Engine: GMT600: 4.3 L L35 V6 (1996–2002); 5.0 L L30 V8 (1996–2002); 5.7 L L31 V8 (1996–2002); 7.4 L L29 V8 (1996–2000); 8.1 L L18 V8 (2001–2002); 6.5 L Detroit Diesel V8/L65 (1996–2002); GMT610: 2.8 L Duramax/LWN I4 turbo-diesel (2017–2022); 4.3 L Vortec 4300/LU3 V6 (2003–2014); 4.3 L EcoTec3 4300/LV1 V6 (2018–present); 4.8 L Vortec 4800/LR4 V8 (2003–2007); 4.8 L Vortec 4800/LY2 V8 (2008–2009); 4.8 L Vortec 4800/L20 Flex-fuel V8 (2010–2017); 5.3 L Vortec 5300 LM7 V8 (2003–2007); 5.3 L Vortec 5300/LMF Flex-fuel V8 (2008–2014); 6.0 L Vortec 6000/LQ4 V8 (2003–2007); 6.0 L Vortec 6000/LY6 V8 (2008–2009); 6.0 L Vortec 6000/L96 Flex-fuel V8 (2010–2020); 6.0 L Vortec 6000/LC8 gasoline/CNG/LPG V8 (2018–2020); 6.6 L Duramax Diesel/LLY V8 (2006–2007); 6.6 L Duramax Diesel/LMM V8 (2007–2010); 6.6 L Duramax Diesel/LGH V8 (2011–2016); 6.6 L L8T V8 (2021–present)
- Transmission: GMT600: 4-speed automatic 4L60-E (1500 and light-duty 2500 series); 4-speed automatic 4L80-E (heavy-duty 2500 and 3500 series); GMT610: 4-speed automatic 4L60-E on 1500 and light-duty 2500 (2003–2014); 4-speed automatic 4L80-E on heavy-duty 2500 and 3500 (2003–2009); 6-speed automatic 6L90-E on heavy-duty 2500 and 3500 (2010–2023); 8-speed automatic 8L90-E on 2.8L Duramax and 4.3L Ecotec3 V6 engines (2017–present), 6.6L V8 (2024-present)

Dimensions
- Wheelbase: SWB: 135.0 in (3,429 mm); LWB: 155.0 in (3,937 mm)
- Length: GMT600: 1996–98 SWB: 218.8 in (5,558 mm); 1996–98 LWB: 238.8 in (6,066 mm); 1999–2002 SWB: 218.7 in (5,555 mm); 1999–2002 LWB: 238.7 in (6,063 mm); GMT610: 2003–present SWB: 224.1 in (5,692 mm); 2003–present LWB: 244.1 in (6,200 mm); 2003–05 Savana LWB: 244.0 in (6,198 mm)
- Width: GMT600: SWB: 79.2 in (2,012 mm); LWB: 79.4 in (2,017 mm); GMT610 79.4 in (2,017 mm)
- Height: GMT600: 1996–98 Express: 81.8 in (2,078 mm); 1996–98 Savana SWB/2500 SWB & 3500 LWB: 82.5 in (2,096 mm); 1996–98 Savana LWB: 84.8 in (2,154 mm); 1500 & 2001–02 3500 LS LWB: 79.6 in (2,022 mm); 1997–2002 3500 SWB: 83.9 in (2,131 mm); 1997–2002 2500 LWB: 81.1 in (2,060 mm); 2001–02 2500 LWB: 82.2 in (2,088 mm); 2001–02 3500 LWB: 82.8 in (2,103 mm); GMT610: 2003–present SWB: 81.6 in (2,073 mm); 2003–present LWB: 82.0 in (2,083 mm)

Chronology
- Predecessor: Chevrolet Sportvan (G-Series); GMC Vandura/Rally

The Chevrolet Express (also known as the GMC Savana) is a series of full-size vans produced by General Motors since 1996. The successor to the Chevrolet G-series van, the Express is produced in passenger and cargo variants. Alongside the standard van body, the line is offered as a cutaway van chassis, which is a chassis cab variant developed for commercial-grade applications, including ambulances, buses, motorhomes, and small trucks.

In production for a single generation since 1996, over three million examples of the Express and the Savana have been produced. One of the longest-produced designs in American automotive history, the Express/Savana are rivaled only by the Jeep Wagoneer, Ford Econoline, and Dodge Ram Van for longevity.

Since 1995, General Motors has assembled the Express and Savana at its Wentzville Assembly facility (Wentzville, Missouri). Also, since 2017, GM has sourced commercial cutaway-chassis production from Navistar through its Springfield Assembly Plant (Springfield, Ohio).

== Model history ==
=== Pre-facelift (1996–2002) ===
Express / Savana (1996–2002)

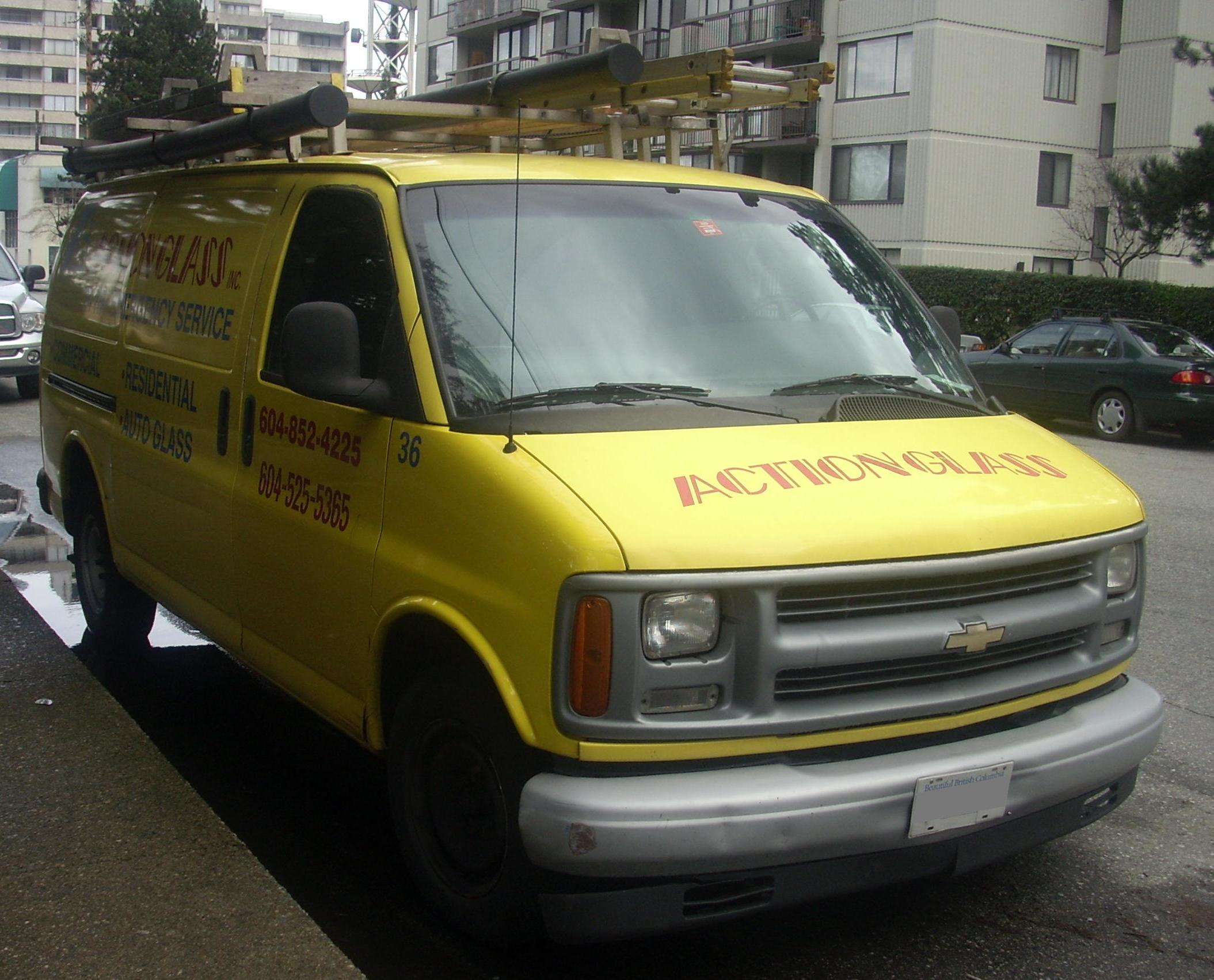
Front (Cargo and base, sealed beam)

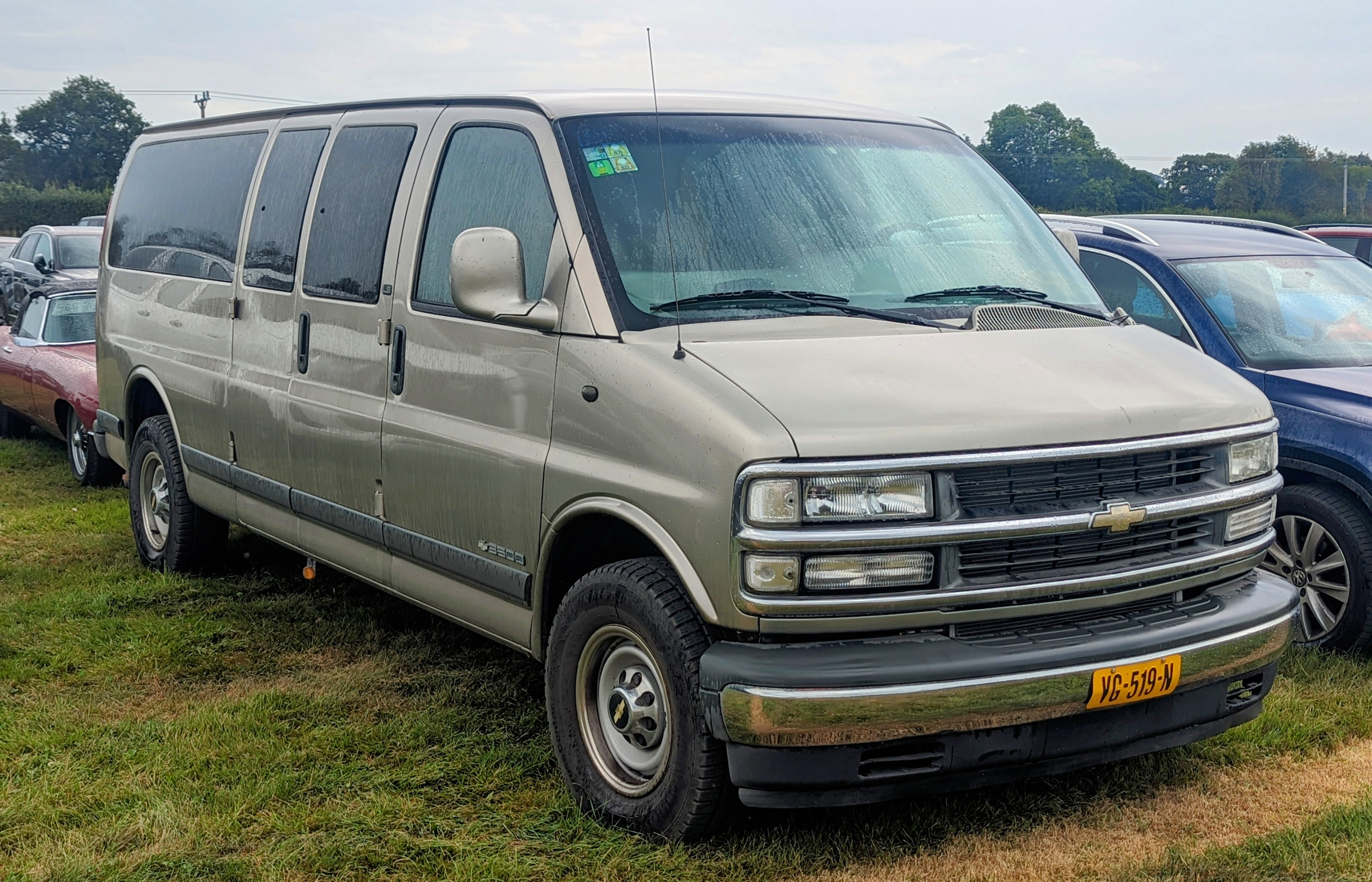
Front (LS, composite headlamps)

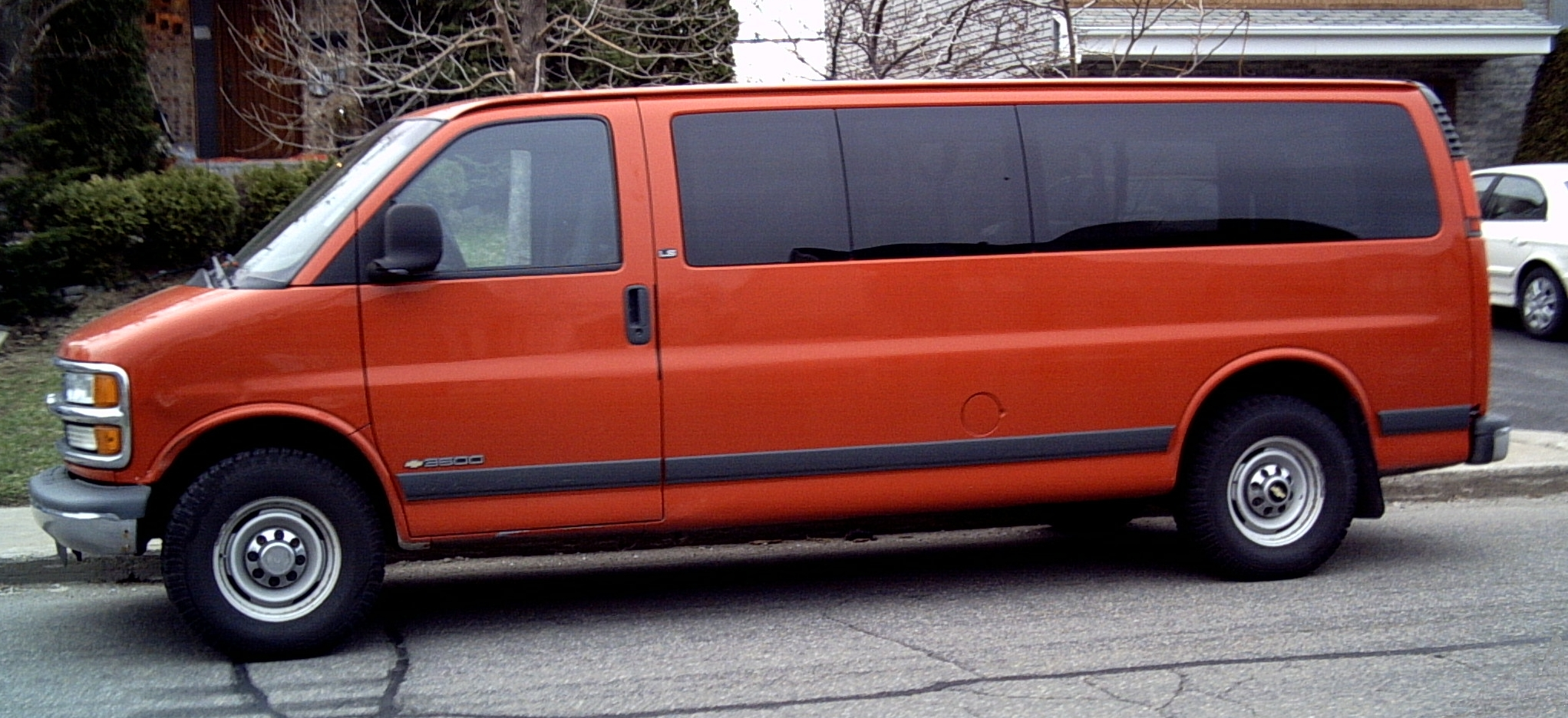
Side (3500 LS)

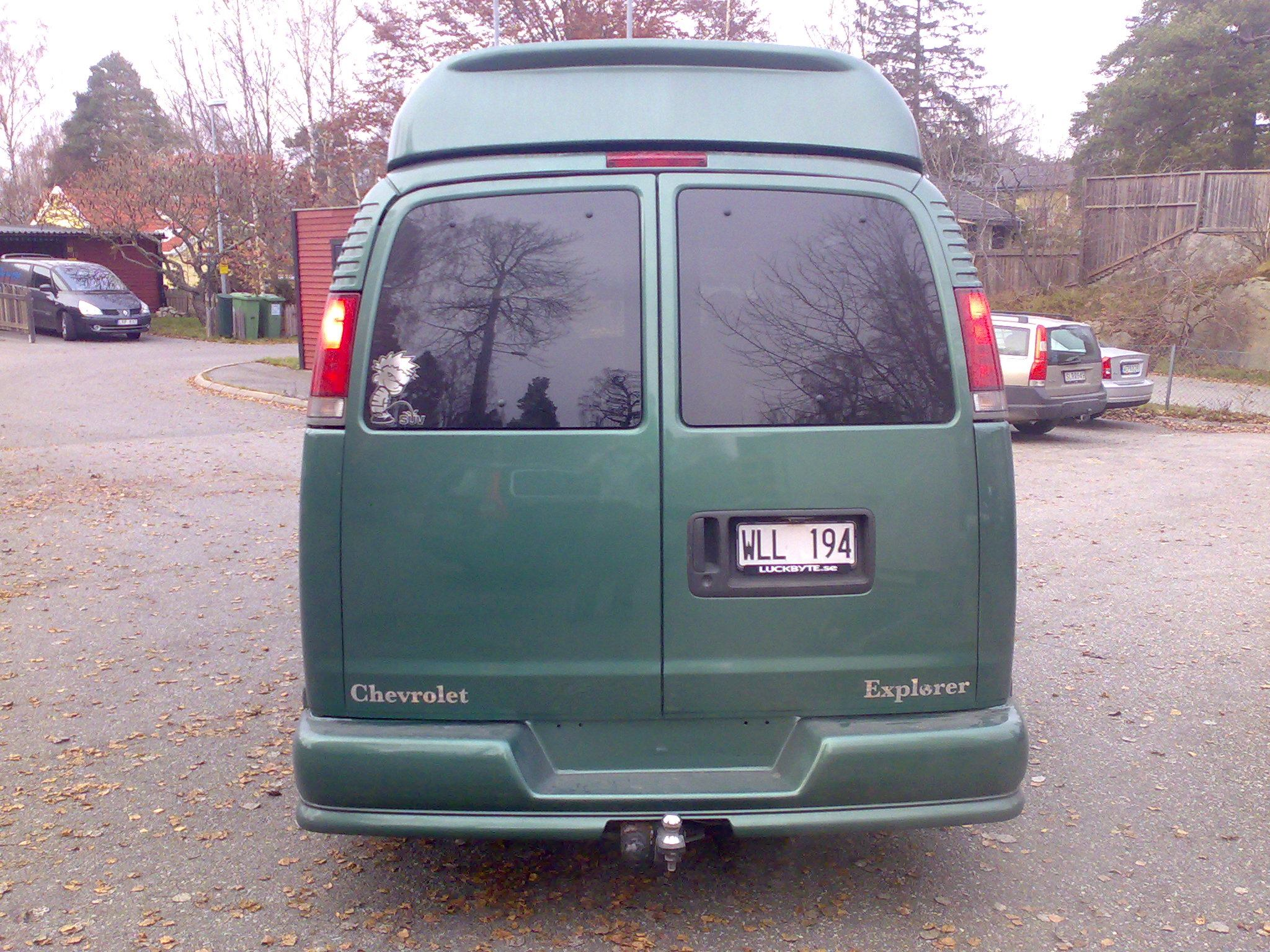
Rear view, showing taillamps (1998)

For the 1996 model year, Chevrolet replaced the G-series Chevrolet Van with the Chevrolet Express (retaining Chevrolet Van for cargo vans). The first all-new design for the General Motors full-size van line since 1971, the model line was offered in passenger-van and cargo-van variants (the latter initially retained the Chevrolet Van name), with GMC replacing the Vandura/Rally with the Savana. Alongside the first substantial redesign of the model line in 25 years, GM predicted substantial growth in the full-size segment through the end of the 1990s.

In a major functional change, the front axle was moved forward 10 inches, effectively moving the front wheels out of the passenger compartment; along with improving front legroom, the design allowed a reduction in step-in height (improving access). While sharing the same engine sizes as the previous model line, the size of the engine cover was reduced, further increasing front passenger space. On all vehicles below 8,500 lbs GVWR (1500 and 2500 series), the Express was introduced with standard dual airbags; for 1997, dual airbags were standardized for all versions of the model line.

Cargo and base models were equipped with a single sealed beam halogen headlamp on each side. The LS trim changed this to a composite headlamp assembly.

For 1999, a few minor functional changes were made to the model line. In a more noticeable update, Chevrolet retired the Chevrolet Van nameplate entirely, with the cargo van renamed the Express Cargo Van.

=== Facelift (2003–present) ===
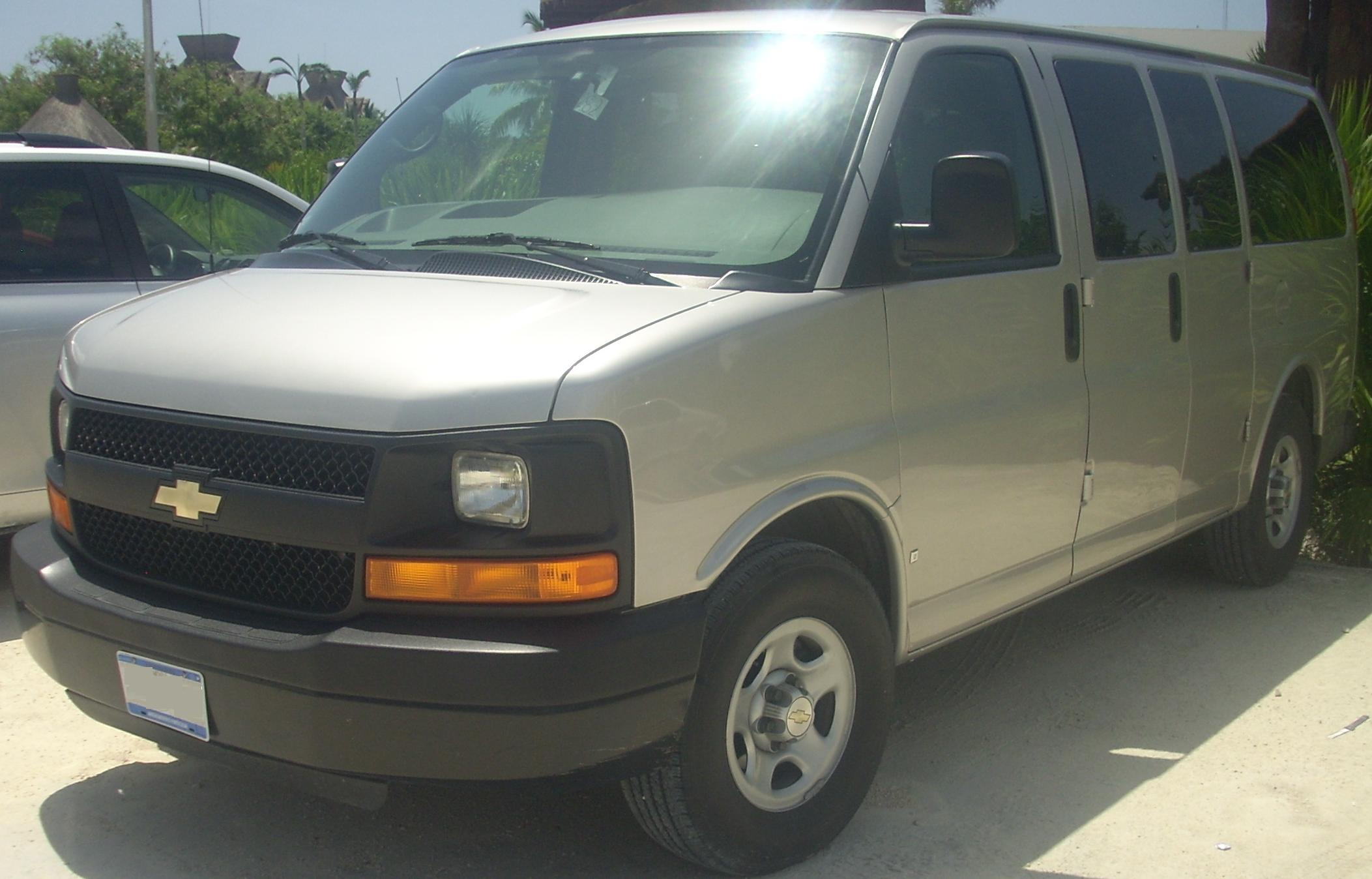
2006–2010 Chevrolet Express (with left-side passenger doors)

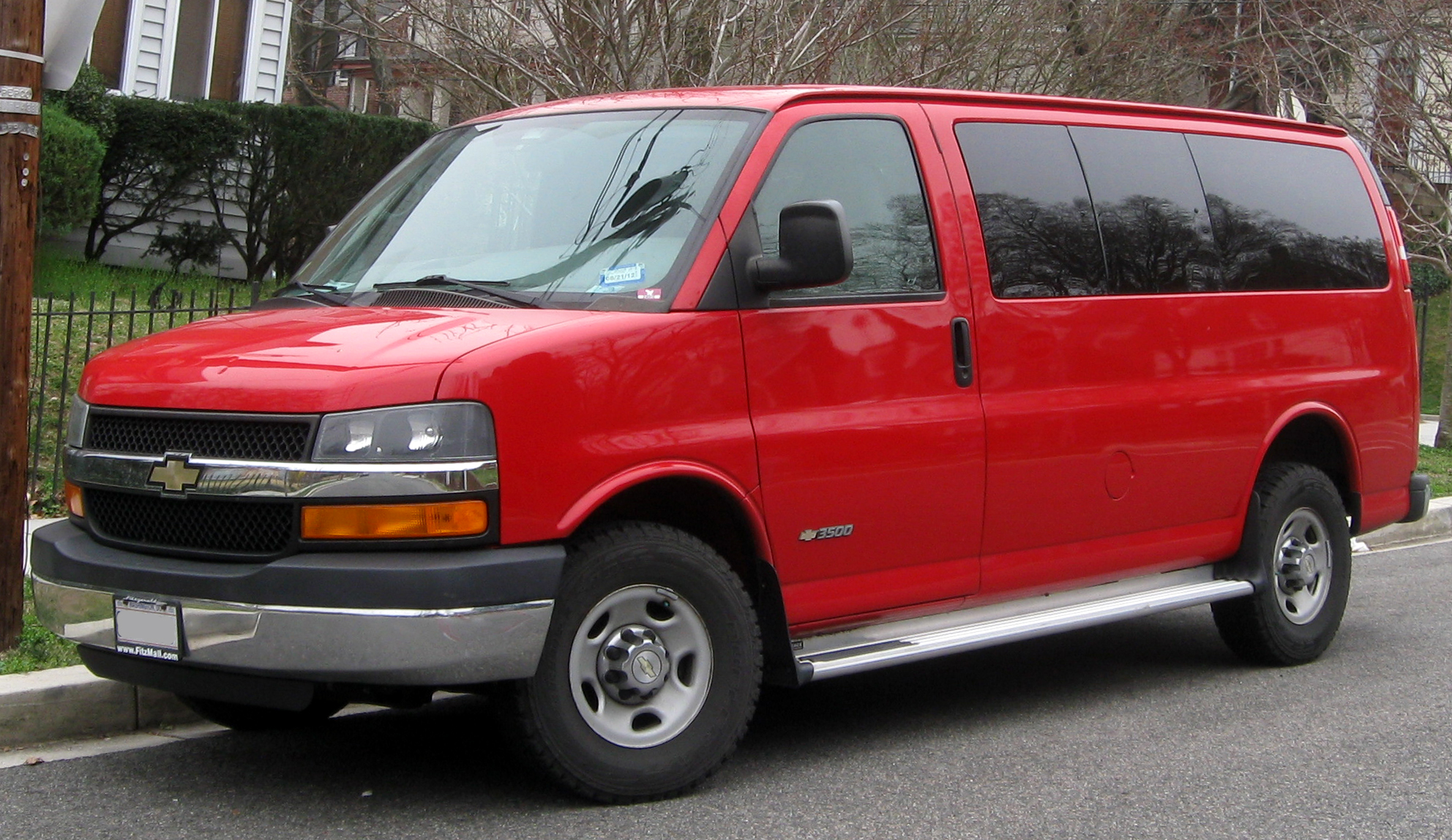
2003–2006 Chevrolet Express 3500 passenger van

For 2003, the Express and Savana underwent a mid-cycle revision. Alongside substantial frame and chassis upgrades, the bodywork forward of the windshield was revised. Distinguished by a higher hood line, the newer front fascia (developed as an improved crumple zone) was brought closer in line with the GMT800 full-size pickup trucks introduced for 1999; the model line also introduced a degree of parts commonality between the two model lines. The dashboard underwent a redesign; along with the addition of dual-stage airbags, the interior added multiplex wiring (adding increased functionality to the interior electrical system).

The Express and Savana offered with 60/40 split panel doors on the passenger-side of the vehicle; in a first (since the Corvair cargo van), an option was added for the driver-side to receive the same split panel doors; this option was limited to the standard-length body (requiring doors on both sides). The option for the driver-side split 60/40 panel doors was available through the 2014 model year.

Since its 2003 model revision, the Express has seen incremental updates to the model line. The light-duty 2500 vans (below 8,500 pounds GVWR) were discontinued for 2006. For 2008, the Express passenger van received side-curtain airbags and standard stability control (introduced for 3500-series vans for 2005); the steering wheel, seats, and gauge cluster were also redesigned. For 2011, the dashboard received upgrades (including Bluetooth compatibility and a USB port). For 2013, higher-trim passenger vans received an optional navigation system, rearview camera, and parking assist system.

For 2015, all radios became digitally tuned and a 120-volt three-prong AC outlet was added to the dash. For 2018, the Express dropped sealed-beam headlights from all models, adopting the four composite headlamps of higher-trim passenger vans. This would be the final passenger vehicle to have factory standard sealed-beam headlights marketed in the United States, although many LED retrofits do exist for other sealed-beam headlight vehicles. A blind spot monitoring system also became optional. For the 2019 model year, higher-trim passenger vans received lane departure warning systems and collision alert warning features.

An all-wheel drive option was offered for the model years 2003–2014 on 1500 and light-duty 2500 vans (below 8,500 lbs GVWR). AWD vans came exclusively with a 135" wheelbase and GM's 5.3L V8.

For 2022, the Express entered its 26th year of production, overtaking the 1971–1996 Chevrolet Van in production longevity. As the music format had been phased out of automobiles (in favor of Bluetooth-based content), the CD player was discontinued as an option.

For 2024, the Express and Savana received updated 8-speed automatic transmissions for both V6 and V8 engines. Later in the model year, infotainment availability was reduced to a single option, an AM/FM/MP3 stereo with auxiliary jack, urethane steering wheel, and two front door speakers. For 2025, an auxiliary 12-volt starter battery was no longer available to order.

As of current production, the GMT610 platform is anticipated to be produced in its current form through the 2026 model year. Originally intended for replacement by a fully-electric vehicle (using GM Ultium battery technology) derived from the BrightDrop Zevo, plans were later revised in favor of a substantial revision of the existing platform for the 2027 model year (under the model code GMT620); no details of GMT620 were released, though Ultium technology was dropped entirely in favor of retaining a lineup of internal combustion engines.

In February 2024, GM abandoned its plans to produce an electric full-size van; the status of the GMT620 redesign is also unknown, leaving the model line without a replacement beyond the 2025–2026 model year.

On August 31st, 2026, GM started production of the Chevrolet Express for the 2027 model year with the model being largely unchanged from the 2026 model year.

== Model overview ==
=== Chassis ===
The Chevrolet Express and GMC Savana use the GM GMT600 chassis, developed exclusively for full-size vans. Derived loosely from the GMT400 chassis of the fourth-generation C/K trucks, the model line uses a full-length ladder frame with boxed forward frame rails. The GMT600 chassis was offered in two wheelbases: standard-length 135-inch and extended 155-inch (though the latter was only available on the 2500 and 3500 series). A replacement for the 110-inch short-wheelbase van (discontinued after 1992) was not included as part of the GMT600 design, as the short-body van had functionally been superseded by the Chevrolet Astro/GMC Safari mid-size vans.

For 2003, the GMT600 chassis underwent a substantial revision and was redesignated GMT610. In line with the GMT800 chassis, the GMT610 adopted a three-section fully-boxed frame. With slight modifications, the GMT610 also adopted the front suspension of the GMT800 pickup trucks, with short- and long-arm front suspension (rear-wheel drive) and torsion-bar front springs (all-wheel drive). In another change, four-wheel disc brakes were introduced, standardizing anti-lock brakes (ABS). In a first for the full-size van segment, the GMT610 platform was also offered with full-time all-wheel drive as an option.

==== Powertrain details ====
The Chevrolet Express and GMC Savana were initially available with five engine options. Shared with C/K pickup trucks, a 4.3 L V6 was standard, while 5.0 L, 5.7 L, 6.5 L turbo-diesel, and 7.4 L V8s were options. All gasoline engines adopted the "Vortec" port-fuel injection upgrades for 1996, increasing power and torque outputs; the 6.5 L turbo-diesel was offered in a GM full-size van for the first time. All engines were paired with a 4-speed overdrive automatic transmission, carried over from the previous van; the 1500 and light-duty 2500 series (below 8,500 pounds GVWR) used a 4L60-E transmission while the heavy-duty 2500 and 3500 series (above 8,500 pounds GVWR) used a heavier-duty 4L80-E unit.

For 2001, the Vortec 7400 was replaced by the longer-stroke Vortec 8100 (at 496 cubic inches, this is the largest-displacement engine ever factory-marketed by Chevrolet); the engine was offered for the Express through 2002.

For 2003, the engine lineup underwent a series of revisions. The 4.3 L V6 was retained but was only available on the 1500 and light-duty 2500 series. The "Generation III" small-block V8 engines (based on the LS-series engines) were introduced, with the Express and Savana receiving the 5.3 L V8 (on light-duty vans) and the 4.8 L and 6.0 L V8s (on heavy-duty vans).

For 2006, the Express and Savana were once again offered with a diesel engine option, adopting a detuned version of the 6.6 L Duramax V8 (LGH) from the Chevrolet Kodiak and GMC TopKick. For 2007, the 5.3 L V8 was available with flex-fuel (E85) capability; this was made standard in 2008.

For 2010, 2500- and 3500-series vans used the six-speed 6L90 transmission, and the 4.8 L and 6.0 L V8s gained flex-fuel (E85 capability).

Coinciding with the discontinuation of the 1500 series, the Vortec 4300 V6 (the final engine derived from the original Chevrolet small-block V8) was discontinued in 2014.

After 2016, the 6.6 L Duramax diesel V8 was discontinued; a 2.8 L inline-4 Duramax (the first four-cylinder in a full-size Chevrolet van since 1964) replaced it as the diesel engine offering. For 2018, an "EcoTec3" 4.3 L V6 was introduced as the base gasoline engine; the same year, CNG/LPG capability was added as an option to the 6.0 L V8.

For 2021, the 6.0 L V8 was replaced by an all-new 6.6 L V8 (L8T) first introduced in the 2020 Silverado HD.

The 1500 and light-duty 2500 series had a 3.42 or 3.73 axle ratio, while the heavy-duty 2500 and 3500 series vans have either a 3.73 axle or 4.10 axle ratio.

Gasoline engines
| Engine | Engine family | Production | Notes |
|---|---|---|---|
| 262 cu in (4.3 L) V6 | Chevrolet 90° V6 | 1996–2002 (L35) 2003–2014 (LU3) | Standard engine on 1500 and light-duty 2500 vans (was also available on heavy-duty 2500 vans until 2002, and passenger vans until 2006) Final engine derived from original Chevrolet small-block V8 |
| 263 cu in (4.3 L) V6 | GM 90° V6 | 2018–present (LV1) | EcoTec3 Standard engine on current production; available only on 2500 and 3500 vans, replaced 4.8L V8 |
| 293 cu in (4.8 L) V8 | GM Generation III small-block V8 | 2003–2007 (LR4) | Vortec 4800, replaced 5.0L V8 Available only on heavy-duty 2500 and 3500 vans; flex-fuel capability added for 2010 |
| 293 cu in (4.8 L) V8 | GM Generation IV small-block V8 | 2008–2009 (LY2) 2010–2017 (L20) | Vortec 4800, replaced 5.0L V8 Available only on heavy-duty 2500 and 3500 vans; flex-fuel capability added for 2010 |
| 305 cu in (5.0 L) V8 | Chevrolet small-block V8 | 1996–2002 (L30) | Vortec 5000, replaced by 4.8L V8 Available only on 1500 and light-duty 2500 vans |
| 325 cu in (5.3 L) V8 | GM Generation III small-block V8 | 2003–2007 (LM7) 2008–2014 (LMF) | Vortec 5300, replaced 5.7L V8 Available only on 1500 and light-duty 2500 vans; standard on 1500 passenger vans from 2007 to 2014 |
| 325 cu in (5.3 L) V8 | GM Generation IV small-block V8 | 2003–2007 (LM7) 2008–2014 (LMF) | Vortec 5300, replaced 5.7L V8 Available only on 1500 and light-duty 2500 vans; standard on 1500 passenger vans from 2007 to 2014 |
| 350 cu in (5.7 L) V8 | Chevrolet small-block V8 | 1996–2002 (L31) | Vortec 5700, replaced by 5.3L V8 and 6.0L V8 |
| 364 cu in (6.0 L) V8 | GM Generation III small-block V8 | 2003–2008 (LQ4) 2010–2020 (L96) 2018–2020 (LC8) | Vortec 6000, replaced 5.7L V8 and 8.1L V8 Flex-fuel capability added in 2010, and CNG/LPG (propane) option added in 2018 Available only on heavy-duty 2500 and 3500 vans, and standard on the 4500 chassis |
| 364 cu in (6.0 L) V8 | GM Generation IV small-block V8 | 2003–2008 (LQ4) 2010–2020 (L96) 2018–2020 (LC8) | Vortec 6000, replaced 5.7L V8 and 8.1L V8 Flex-fuel capability added in 2010, and CNG/LPG (propane) option added in 2018 Available only on heavy-duty 2500 and 3500 vans, and standard on the 4500 chassis |
| 400 cu in (6.6 L) V8 | GM Generation V small-block V8 | 2021–present (L8T) | Replaced 6.0L V8 First V8 direct-injection gasoline engine used by model line Available only on 2500 and 3500 vans, and standard on the 4500 chassis |
| 454 cu in (7.4 L) V8 | Chevrolet Generation VI big-block V8 | 1996–2000 (L29) | Vortec 7400, replaced by 8.1L V8 Available only on 3500 vans |
| 496 cu in (8.1 L) V8 | Chevrolet Generation VII big-block V8 | 2001–2002 (L18) | Vortec 8100, replaced by 6.0L V8 Highest-displacement V8 ever factory-offered in a full-size van Available only on 3500 vans |
Diesel engines (available on heavy-duty 2500 and 3500 series vans only)
| Engine | Engine family | Production | Notes |
| 169 cu in (2.8 L) I4 turbo-diesel | DMAX Duramax I4 engine | 2017–2022 (LWN) | Replaced 6.6L V8 turbo-diesel First inline-4 in full-size van since 1964 |
| 395 cu in (6.5 L) V8 turbo-diesel | Detroit Diesel V8 | 1996–2002 (L65) | First GM van offered with turbocharged diesel engine |
| 404 cu in (6.6 L) V8 turbo-diesel | DMAX Duramax V8 engine | 2006–2007 (LLY) 2007-2010 (LMM) 2011–2016 (LGH) | Diesel particulate filter system added for 2010 production Replaced by 2.8L I4 turbo-diesel Also offered on the 4500 chassis |

=== Body design ===
Far more aerodynamic than its predecessor, the Chevrolet Express derived much of exterior styling from the Chevrolet Astro mid-size van (including its flush-mounted exterior glass), deriving its grille from multiple trims of the Chevrolet C/K pickup trucks. Similar to the APV minivans, the Express adopted high-mounted taillamps next to the rear windows, placed above the rear door hinges. In a design advancement for the market segment, the rear doors are hinged to open nearly 180 degrees, allowing the vehicle to back up to a loading dock.

The cargo van is offered as a two-passenger vehicle (initially with an optional passenger seat delete); the passenger van is offered as a 5-, 8-, 12-, or 15-passenger vehicle (the latter, only with the extended 155-inch wheelbase).

In reverse of its predecessor, 60/40 split side doors were standard, with a sliding door offered as an option (initially at no cost). From 2003 to 2014, side doors were offered on the driver side; only the split-panel doors were offered, and only on standard-wheelbase bodies.

=== Trim ===
For its 1996 launch, Chevrolet used the Chevrolet Express model name for full-size passenger vans, with Chevrolet Van returning for cargo vans (renamed Express Cargo Van for 1999).

The Express passenger van was introduced with two trim lines: an unnamed base trim (geared largely towards fleet sales) replacing the Sportvan and the upgraded LS, replacing the Beauville. For 2001, an upgraded LT trim, featuring body colored grille, side mirrors, and front and rear bumpers was introduced, but was dropped for 2003. For 2006, the trim line was revised again to the current nomenclature, with the base trim renamed LS, and LS renamed LT. For 2007, the 2500 and 3500 badges on the front doors were dropped.

In line with the previous Chevrolet Van, the Express uses "G" as its internal model designator ("H" was used for all-wheel-drive vans during their production). In line with the fourth-generation C/K pickup trucks, the Express/Savana adopted the 1500/2500/3500 payload series designations. After the 2014 model year, the 1/2-ton 1500-series was discontinued (with GM citing it as the lowest-selling version).

== Variants ==
=== GMC Savana (1996–present) ===
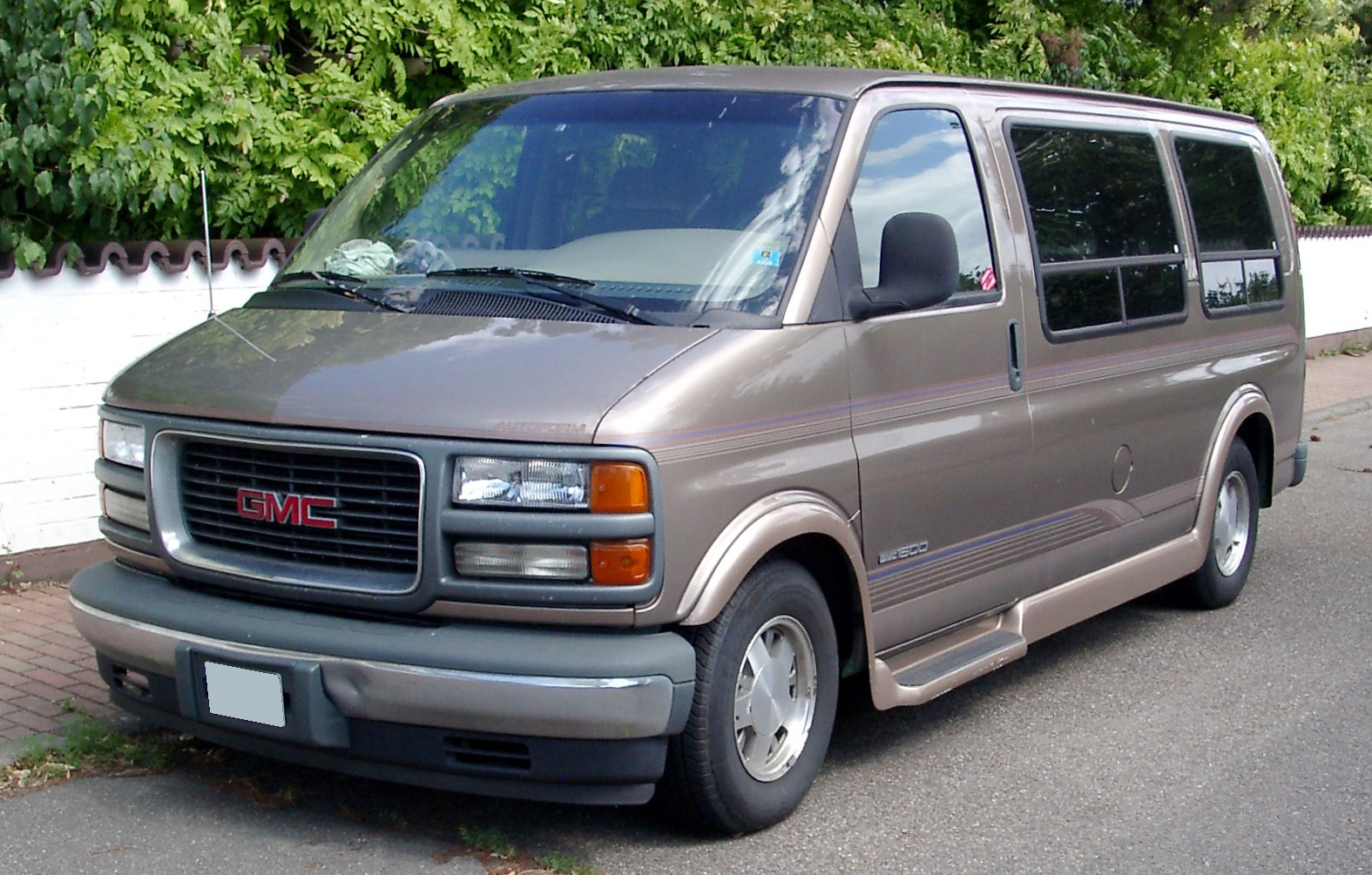
GMC Savana 1500 conversion van (1996–2002)

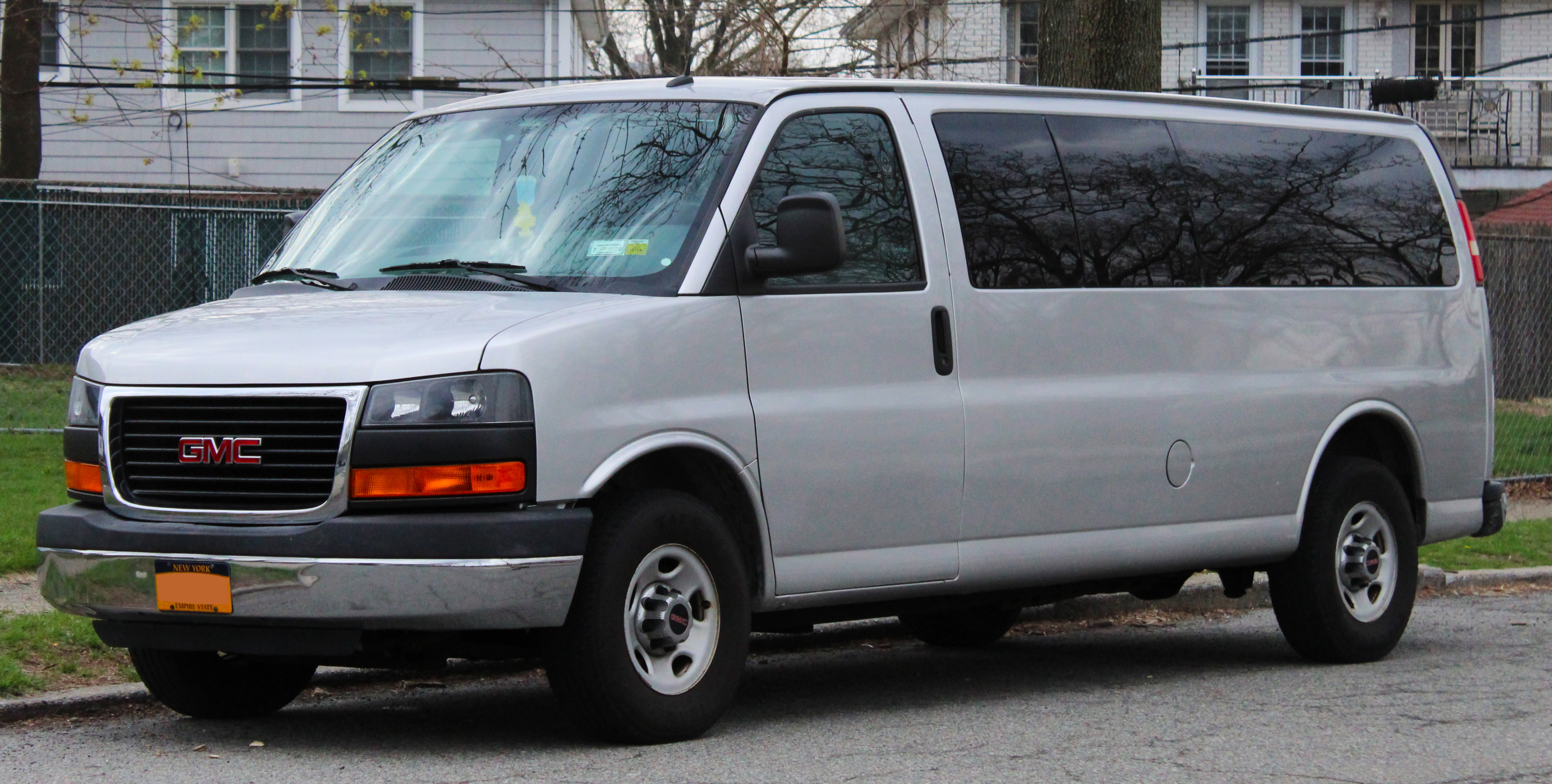
2012 GMC Savana 3500 LWB

Since 1996, GMC has marketed the GMC Savana as its version of the Chevrolet Express. In line with Chevrolet, GMC consolidated the previous GMC Vandura (cargo van) and GMC Rally/Rally STX (passenger van) under a single nameplate, with Savana offered as a passenger van, cargo van, and as a cutaway-chassis vehicle (see below).

With the exception of its grille and GMC divisional badging, the GMC Savana is essentially identical to the Chevrolet Express. Using the same LS and LT trims as Chevrolet, the Savana is the only current GMC model line not offered with the Denali or AT4 trim.

Sharing the same model development as its Chevrolet counterpart, the Savana has undergone only minor detail changes since 2003. As of current production, the Express outsells the Savana approximately three-to-one.

=== GMT560 (2003–2009) ===
For 2003, General Motors introduced the GMT560 medium-duty truck architecture for Chevrolet, GMC, and Isuzu. The vertically oriented cab from the full-size van line replaced the pickup-truck cab previously used. Alongside a two-door configuration, GMT560 vehicles offered a four-door crew cab configuration.

Produced as a Class 5–7 truck, the GMT560 vehicles (the Chevrolet Kodiak, GMC TopKick, and Isuzu H-Series) were offered in 4×2, 4×4, and 6×4 drive for multiple applications.

After 2009, General Motors ended medium-duty truck production, leading to the discontinuation of the GMT560 chassis.

=== Cutaway chassis (1997–present) ===
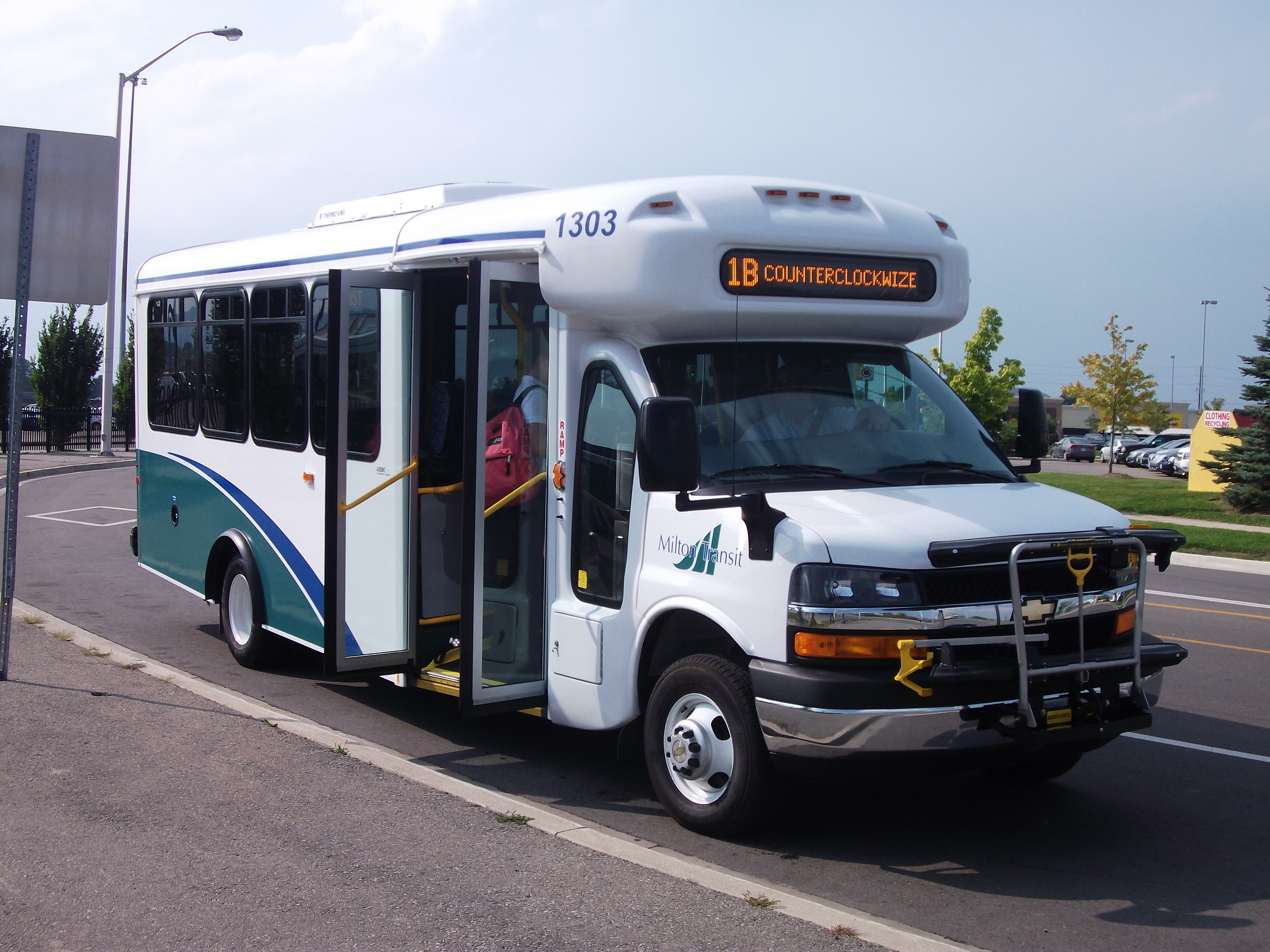
Chevrolet Express G4500 cutaway chassis with low-floor bus body

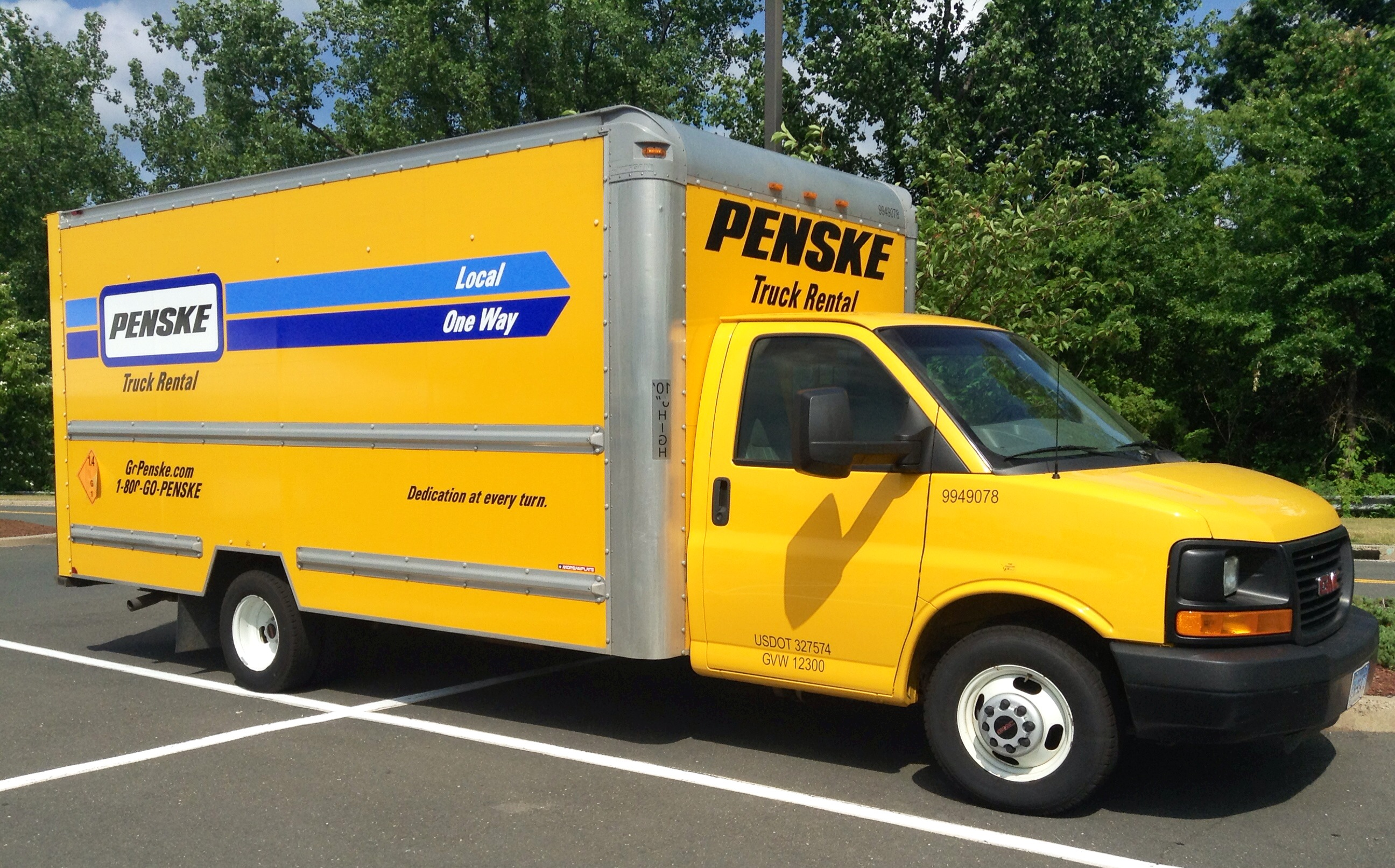
GMC Savana G3500 with moving truck body (Penske)

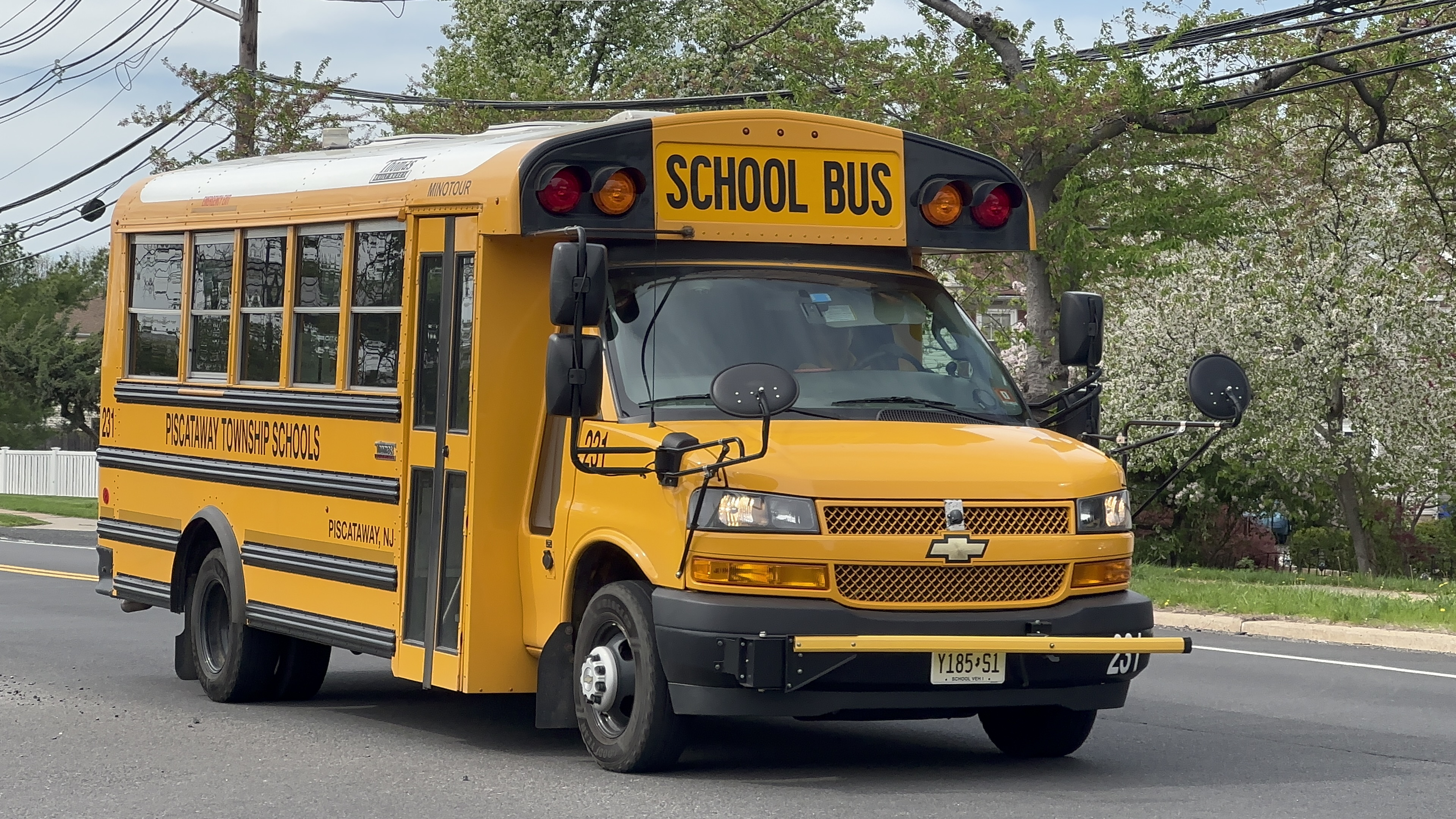
Chevrolet Express with a Thomas Minotour body (NJ spec)

For 1997, GM introduced a cutaway-chassis version of the 3500-series Express/Savana. Replacing the previous G30/G3500 (the larger "HD" variant was not replaced), the cutaway-chassis Express/Savana is an incomplete vehicle (a chassis produced with no bodywork aft of the front seats) intended for additional fabrication by a second-party manufacturer. Intended for a wide variety of potential applications, cutaway chassis are best known as the basis of ambulances, buses (shuttle buses and school buses), and recreational vehicles (RVs); they also are fitted with delivery truck bodies or utility bodies (increasing their storage space over a standard cargo van).

Offered with either Chevrolet Express and GMC Savana branding on both the GMT600 and GMT610 platforms, the cutaway chassis is offered on the 3500 series in both dual-rear-wheel and single-rear-wheel configurations (the latter, trading increased maneuverability for lower GVWR). For 2009, GM introduced a 4500-series Express/Savana developed specifically for cutaway applications, raising its GVWR to 14,200 pounds and effectively filling the void left by the G3500HD's 1997 discontinuation.

Since 2017, GM has outsourced production of certain GMT610 cutaway-chassis vehicles, contracting production to Navistar International.

=== VTRUX Van ===
VIA Motors previously converted Chevrolet Express vans into electric vehicles since 2014. This was the first Chevrolet-derived van to be built with an electric powertrain ever since the 1980s with the Griffon van which was a heavily modified version of the British Bedford CF Electric.

== Other uses of nameplate ==
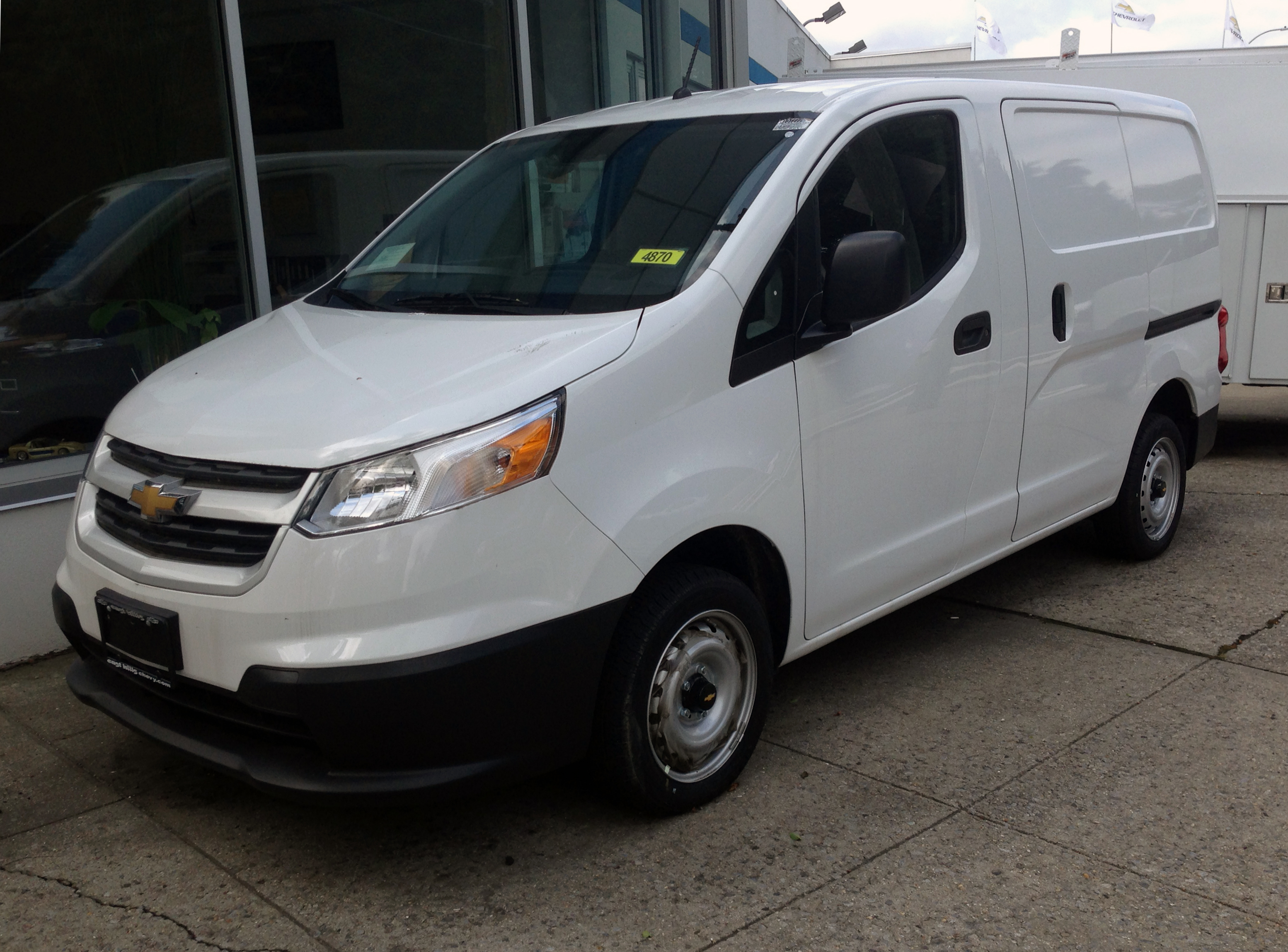
2015 Chevrolet City Express LS cargo van (Nissan NV200)

Chevrolet used the Express nameplate for the first time on an unrelated 1987 concept car designed for future limited-access highways. The vehicle was turbine-powered with drive-by-wire controls. A similar name was used on the Chevrolet City Express, a rebadged Nissan NV200.
