= Armes =

Armes may refer to:

== People ==
- Armes (surname)
- Armes Beaumont (1842–1913), English-born vocalist active in Australia

== Places ==
- Armes, Nièvre, commune in France
