= Waist clothes =

Waist clothes, also called armings or fights, were colored clothes or sheets, usually red, that were hung around the outside of a ship's upper works, fore and aft, and before the cubbridge heads. They were used as an adornment during ceremonious occasions, and served as a visual screen during times of action, to protect the men aboard. They were sometimes also hung around the tops, in which case they were called top armings.
