= Armen =

Armen may refer to:

- the Armani, a tribe of the Armenian Highlands and Anatolia
  - sometimes associated with the Name of Armenia
- Armen (name), including a list of people with the name

== Places ==
- Armen, Albania, a village in southern Albania
- Ar Men ("the rock" in Breton), a lighthouse at one end of the Chaussée de l'Île de Sein, at the west end of Brittany

== See also ==
- Armin (name)
- Armine
