= Armet Armored Vehicles =

- Industry: Manufacturing
- Headquarters: King City, Ontario, Canada

Armet Armored Vehicles is a defunct vehicle manufacturer founded and formerly headquartered in King City, Ontario with US operations in Danville, Virginia.

Armet was founded by Canadian owner and CEO William Whyte after purchasing then California based Armet Industries (c. 1976) in 1982.

Whyte stated he was born in Surrey, England, served in the British Army from 1964 to 1967, immigrated to Canada where he would become a police officer in Toronto (Metro Toronto Police 1967-1973), York Region Police (1979?-1980s). He was on a contract with Hong Kong Police for six months in 1973.

Whyte was indicted by the FBI for fraud and sentenced to more than five years in prison. In 2011, the company's GURKHA vehicle design was sold to Terradyne Armored Vehicles.

Post-release, William Whyte has proclaimed his innocence online, stating that the charges against him were not proven.
