= HeritageRail Alliance =

The HeritageRail Alliance is an organization for promoting the interests of and sharing information among railway preservation groups and tourist railroads.

== Programs and services ==
This is a placeholder. Please describe the group's programs and services here.

== HeritageRail Alliance history ==
=== Association of Railway Museums (ARM) ===
ARM was dedicated to the interests of railway preservation across North America in museums and other non-profit organizations.

ARM published a quarterly newsletter, Railway Museum Quarterly. ARM held periodic conventions in various locations around the United States and Canada to share information among the member organizations. Issues addressed included insurance, regulations, fund raising, marketing, operations, volunteers, restoration, maintenance, safety and recommended museum practices.

=== Tourist Railway Association, Inc. (TRAIN) ===
TRAIN was formed to benefit tourist railways in the United States. It also had its own newsletter (Trainline) and held regular conferences.

=== Merger ===
Since there was overlap in the interests of railway preservation and tourist railroads, the ARM and TRAIN began a program of holding joint conferences. First begun as a pilot program with the 2001 ARM-TRAIN conference hosted by the North Carolina Transportation Museum, a second joint conference was held in 2006 hosted by the California State Railroad Museum, beginning in 2011 all Spring and Fall meetings scheduled for the future were held jointly.

In 2011, it was decided to merge the two organizations into a single organization, the Association of Tourist Railways and Railway Museums (ATR&RM). In November 2012, a formal vote on the proposal was held, with the majority of the members voting in favor of the merger. In 2013, the Association of Railway Museums formally merged with the Tourist Railway Association, Inc. to become the Association of Tourist Railways and Railway Museums. The first Fall meeting of the new organization was hosted by the Orange Empire Railway Museum at Riverside, California in October 2013.

It was quickly acknowledged that the name Association of Tourist Railways and Railway Museums while descriptive, was also ungainly. In 2017 it was decided to change the organization's name to the HeritageRail Alliance and update the branding and website accordingly.
