= 2014–15 Bharat FC season =

2014–15 season of Bharat FC

Bharat FC
2014–15 season
- Manager: Stuart Watkiss
- Stadium: Shree Shiv Chhatrapati Sports Complex
Home colours	Away colours	Third colours

The 2014–15 season will be Bharat FC's first season in the I-League and first season in existence.

== Background ==
On 25 August 2014 it was announced that Kalyani Group had won the bidding rights to a new I-League team and that they would base the team in Pune, Maharashtra. On 4 November 2014 it was announced that former Wolverhampton Wanderers defender Stuart Watkiss would be the first head coach of the team's history. Then, six days later, on 10 November, it was announced that the team had signed their first player in New Zealand international Kris Bright. On 15 November, Stanley Rozario was appointed as the assistant coach. On 23 November, the team was officially unveiled as Bharat FC.

== Pre-season ==
The club started the season with two friendlies against Bombay Engineer Group, which they won 3–0 and the second one 5–0, courtesy two goals from Steven Dias and a goal each from Subhash Singh, Surojit Bose and Jayashelan Prasad. In the last friendly before the season, Bharat FC played against Air India and managed a 2–2 draw with a goal each from Kris Bright and Gunashekar Vignesh.

=== Matches ===
January 2015	Bharat FC	3–0	(India) BEG	Pune, Maharashtra
		Report

12 January 2015	Bharat FC	5–0	(India) BEG	Pune, Maharashtra
	Dias (2 goals); Singh; Bose; Prasad	Report

16 January 2015	Bharat FC	2–2	Air India	Pune, Maharashtra
15:30 IST	Bright 36'; Vignesh 52'		Neil Gaikwad 26'; Vishnu T 53'	Stadium: Bharati Vidyapeeth Ground

== I-League ==
=== Table ===
Pos	Team	Pld	W	D	L	GF	GA	GD	Pts	Qualification or relegation
7	Salgaocar	20	7	3	10	25	27	−2	24 (Note: Mumbal ahead on head-to-head goal difference; Mumbai–Salgaocar 3–0, Salgaocar–Mumbai 3–1)	
8	Sporting Goa	20	5	8	7	22	27	−5	23 (Note: Sporting Goa ahead on head-to-head record; Sporting Goa–Shillong Lajong 1–1, Shillong Lajong–Sporting Goa 1–2)	
9	Shillong Lajong	20	6	5	9	34	29	+5	23	
10	Dempo (R)	20	3	10	7	15	26	−11	19	Relegation to I-League 2nd Division
11	Bharat (Note: Bharat FC were not relegated as they had relegation immunity for two years.)	20	4	6	10	13	28	−15	18	

Source: IndiaFooty.com
Rules for classification: 1) points; 2) head-to-head points; 3) head-to-head goal difference; 4) goal difference; 5) number of goals scored; 6) play-off match.
(R) Relegated

=== First-team squad ===
As of 5 January 2015

Note: Flags indicate national team as defined under FIFA eligibility rules; some limited exceptions apply. Players may hold more than one non-FIFA nationality.

No.	Pos.	Nation	Player
—	GK	IND	Arindam Bhattacharya
—	GK	IND	Harshad Meher
—	GK	IND	Shahinlal Meloly
—	DF	ENG	Bobby Hassell
—	DF	IND	Bikramjeet Singh
—	DF	IND	Dharmaraj Ravanan
—	DF	IND	Gouramangi Singh
—	DF	IND	Mehrajuddin Wadoo
—	DF	IND	Nallappan Mohanraj
—	DF	IND	Naorem James Singh
—	DF	IND	Sabas Saleel

No.	Pos.	Nation	Player
—	MF	IND	Adil Khan
—	MF	IND	Dipendu Dowry
—	MF	IND	Gunashekar Vignesh
—	MF	IND	Jayashelan Prasad
—	MF	IND	Lester Fernandez
—	MF	IND	Simranjit Singh
—	FW	NZL	Kris Bright
—	FW	IND	Manjit Singh
—	FW	IND	Rajinder Kumar
—	FW	IND	Subhash Singh
—	FW	IND	Surojit Bose

== Technical Staff ==
Position	Name
Head coach	(England) Stuart Watkiss
Assistant coach	(India) Stanley Rozario
Fitness coach	(England) Lindsay Davis
Physiotherapist	(England) Ian Farmery
