= Mandave =

Village in Maharashtra

- Village
- Interactive map of Mandave
- Country: India
- State: Maharashtra

Mandave is a small village in Ratnagiri district, Maharashtra state in Western India. The 2011 Census of India recorded a total of 855 residents in the village. Mandave's geographical area is approximately 758 hectares (1,870 acres). From this village one can visit all three forts located in Khed taluka; Sumargad, Mahipatgad, and Rasalgad.

== See also ==
- Mandave Kd – a village in Parner taluka, Ahmednagar district, Maharashtra, India
