= Makrandgad =

Fort in Satara district, India

Makrandgad Fort
- Part of Sahyadri Hill Range
- Satara district, Maharashtra

Site information
- Type: Hill fort
- Owner: Government of India
- Controlled by: Maratha Empire (1656-1818); United Kingdom: East India Company (1818-1857); British Raj (1857-1947); India (1947-)
- Open to the public: Yes
- Condition: Ruins

Location
- Shown within Maharashtra
- Location within Maharashtra
- Coordinates: 17°50′57.6″N 73°36′12.2″E
- Height: 4054Ft.

Site history
- Materials: Stone

Makrandgad Fort is a fort near Pratapgad Fort. It is located 156km from Pune, in Satara district, of Maharashtra. The fort is located in the midst of the famous Javli forest. The fort is accessible from the Hatlot and Ghonaspur village. The trek to this fort is an easy one day trek for visitors at Mahabaleshwar. The fort consists of two flattened humps with a ridge between them.

== History ==
This fort was constructed by King Shivaji in 1656 at the same time when Pratapgad was constructed. This fort was though of less importance as it did not command any trade routes or pass but, it was a link between Pratapgad and fort Vasota. It was surrendered by private negotiations to the British in 1818.

== How to reach ==
The nearest town is Mahabaleshwar which is 37 km from Ghonsapur. The base village of the fort is Ghonaspur which is 27km from Pratapgad. There are good hotels in Mahabaleshwar. The trekking path starts from the hillock west of the Ghonsapur. The route is very safe and narrow. There is a dense forest on the trekking route. It takes about one hour to reach the col between the two humps. The right path goes Malikarjun temple and a water spring on the fort and the left path goes to another hump. The night stay on the fort cannot be made due to lack of potable water on the fort. The villagers from the local village make night stay and food arrangements at a reasonable cost. The other route is from the village Hatlot.

== Places to see ==
The fort is said to consist of two portions Madhushikhar and Makrandgad. The Madhu peak is a geographical boundary between Satara, Raigad and Ratnagiri district. The Makrandgad fort is occupied on a small spur. There are few ruins of buildings and water tanks that can be seen on the fort. It takes about half an hour to encircle the fort. The Fort walls are now in ruins. From the top of the fort Pratapgad, Mahipatgad, Rasalgad and Sumargad can be seen on a clear sky.

== See also ==
- List of forts in Maharashtra
- Battles involving the Maratha Empire
