= Cruzeiro, São Paulo =

Cruzeiro
- Municipality
- Municipality of Cruzeiro
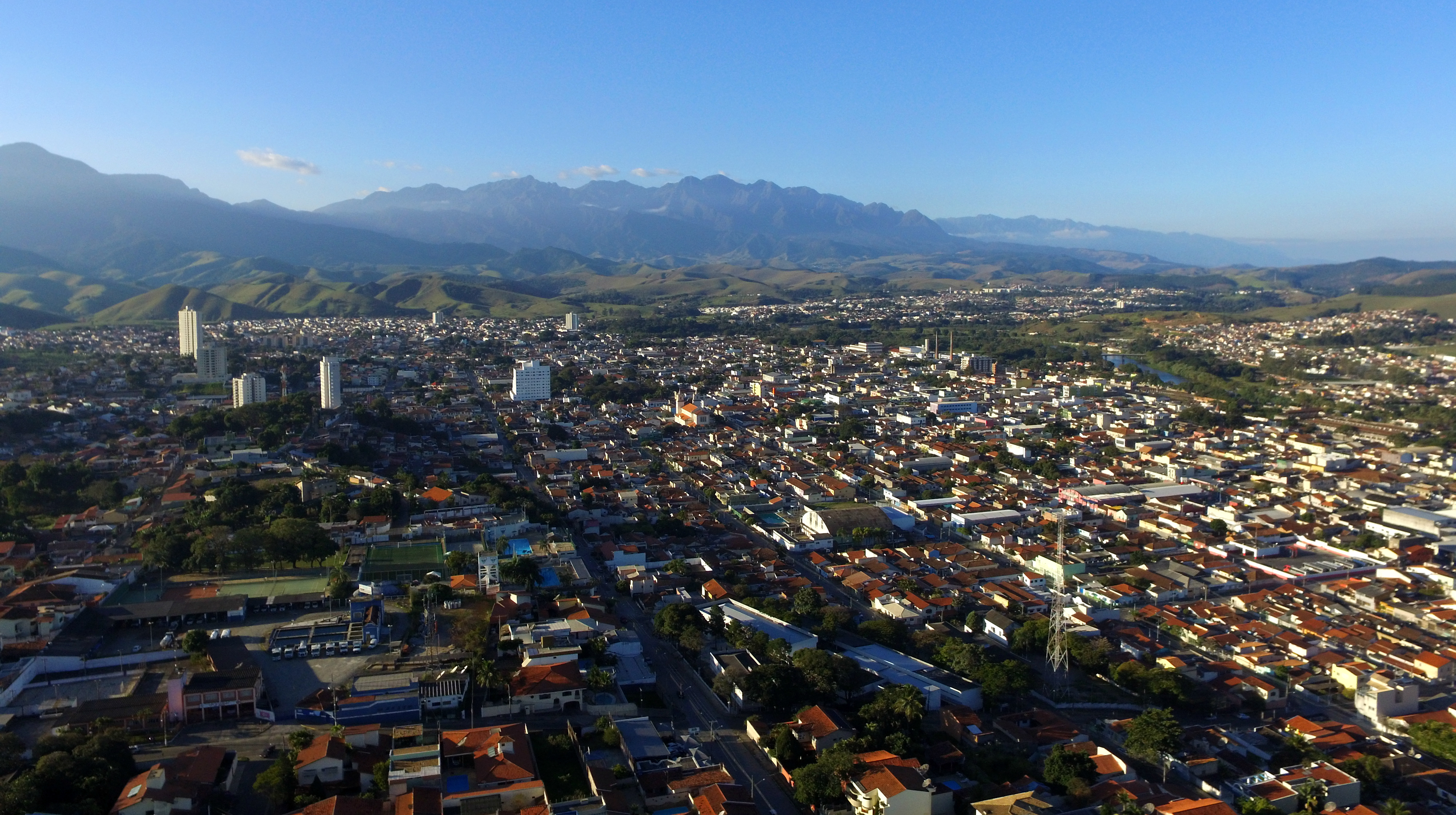
- Aerial view of the city

- Flag Coat of arms

- Location in São Paulo

- Location within Brazil
- Coordinates: 22°34′38″S 44°57′30″W
- Country: Brazil
- Region: Southeast Brazil
- State: São Paulo
- Metropolitan Region: Vale do Paraíba e Litoral Norte
- Founded: 2 October 1901

Government
  - Mayor: Thales Gabriel (SD)

Area
  - Total: 305.70 km^{2} (118.03 sq mi)
- Elevation: 508 m (1,667 ft)

Population (2020)
  - Total: 82,571
  - Density: 270.10/km^{2} (699.57/sq mi)
- Demonym: cruzeirense
- Postal code: 12700-xxx
- Area code: +55-12-31xx-xxxx
- HDI (2010): 0.788 – high
- Website: cruzeiro.sp.gov.br

Cruzeiro (Portuguese meaning the Southern Cross, the Brazilian national symbol) is a municipality in the state of São Paulo in Brazil. It is located about 220 km (137 mi) from the state capital. It is part of the Metropolitan Region of Vale do Paraíba e Litoral Norte. The population is 82,571 (2020 est.) in an area of 305.70 km^{2}. People or objects that come from or inhabit Cruzeiro are called "cruzeirense".

== Demographics ==
Historical population (municipality)
Year	Population	%±
1920	12,676
1940	16,466	29.9%
1950	19,918	21.0%
1960	31,569	58.5%
1970	45,672	44.7%
1980	57,993	27.0%
1991	68,643	18.4%
2000	73,492	7.1%
2010	77,039	4.8%
2022	74,961	−2.7%

== Coat of arms ==
Its coat of arms features a shield with blue on the top and white at the bottom with its part of a flag in the top left and the Southern Cross which has its golden stars on the right.

== Flag ==
Its flag colors are red on the top left with four golden stars with a white circle and its state (São Paulo) where the city is located in the middle and with 13 stripes, seven of them are blue and six of them are white. It has a red tag reading in Portuguese Cultura Civismo meaning Civic Culture on the left, Paz meaning Peace in the middle and Liberdade e Trabalho meaning Freedom and Work on the bottom and a golden crown on the top.

== Geography ==
The municipality is situated at an elevation of 508 m (1,667 ft) in the valley of the river Paraíba do Sul. To the north is the mountain range Serra da Mantiqueira, which reaches elevations up to 2,800 m (9,186 ft) and forms the border with the state of Minas Gerais. Cruzeiro lies about halfway between the two largest agglomerations of Brazil: São Paulo and Rio de Janeiro. Within a radius of 200 km (124 mi) around Cruzeiro, the population is around 40 million people.

The municipality contains part of the 292,000 hectares (720,000 acres) Mananciais do Rio Paraíba do Sul Environmental Protection Area, created in 1982 to protect the sources of the Paraíba do Sul river.

=== Transportation ===
The main highways around Cruzeiro are the President Dutra Highway (BR-116, São Paulo - Rio de Janeiro) and the state highways of SP-52 (towards São Lourenço, Minas Gerais) and SP-58. Cruzeiro has a station on the main railway line from São Paulo to Rio de Janeiro, but this was closed for passenger traffic in 1998.

=== Distances ===
- São Paulo - 210 km (130 mi)
- Rio de Janeiro - 213 km (132 mi)
- Caxambu - 98 km (61 mi)
- Campos do Jordão - 101 km (63 mi)
- São José dos Campos - 120 km (75 mi)

== History ==
Cruzeiro was founded at the junction of the railway lines of three states (São Paulo, Minas Gerais and Rio de Janeiro). The railway, as well as coffee production were important in the 19th century, when Brazil was still an agrarian monarchy.

The first owner of what would be Cruzeiro's lands was Major Novaes, a resident of Fazenda Dona Tita, now a museum.

At the Mantiqueira railway tunnel, north of the city, an important battle between the Federalists and the Constitutionalists took place in 1932.

Nowadays, the municipality contains an economic focus on commerce, tourism, as well as metallurgical industry: e.g., former FNV (Fábrica Nacional de Vagões), now run by Maxion Rodas e Chassis, a division of an international company that produces rail components, makes up for a large part of the fragile economy.

== Media ==
In telecommunications, the city was served by Companhia Telefônica Brasileira until 1973, when it began to be served by Telecomunicações de São Paulo. In July 1998, this company was acquired by Telefónica, which adopted the Vivo brand in 2012.

The company is currently an operator of cell phones, fixed lines, internet (fiber optics/4G) and television (satellite and cable).

== Economy ==
Today, the city's economic focus is on commerce (it has important companies such as Casas Bahia, Pernambucanas, O Lojão Magazine, Lojas Cem, Magazine Luiza, Lojas Americanas) and the metallurgical industry. The former FNV (National Wagon Factory) currently has its industrial park divided between two companies of the Iochpe-Maxion group: Amsted-Maxion Fundição e Equipamentos Ferroviários, which was the merger of the Iochpe-Maxion group with the North American Amsted Industries, and Maxion Sistemas Automotivos-Divisão de Rodas e Chassis. Amsted-Maxion is a reference in foundry, with units in the United States and Hortolândia. Maxion Sistemas Automotivos has branches in Curitiba and the Metropolitan Region of Belo Horizonte, as well as a branch in China, and is a multinational industry of railway components and production of wheels and chassis, with more than 6 thousand employees. The company sells its products to more than 40 countries on five different continents, with the United States, Italy, Argentina, Canada and Venezuela being the largest importers. In addition, the company currently produces chassis for vans, trucks and cars for major national automakers such as Fiat, Volkswagen, Nissan, Scania, among others. The two companies together account for more than half of the city's economy.

== Twin towns ==
Cruzeiro is twinned with

- (Republic of Ireland) Cobh, County Cork, Ireland

== See also ==
- List of municipalities in São Paulo
