= Sabas Saleel =

Indian footballer (born 1990)

Shahbas Saleel
Personal information
- Full name: Shahbas Saleel
- Date of birth: 31 May 1990 (age 36)
- Place of birth: Kerala, India
- Position: Left back

Team information
- Current team: Fifa Manjeri
- Number: 6

Youth career
- 2006–07: Tata Football Academy
- 2007–08: Viva Kerala FC

Senior career*
Years	Team	Apps	(Gls)
2009	Viva Kerala FC	9	(3)
2009–11	ONGC	4	(0)
2011–12	Chirag United Kerala	13	(1)
2012–13	Quartz S.C.	??	(??)
2014–15	Bharat FC	2	(0)
2015	United SC		
2018–	Gokulam Kerala FC	0	(0)
2016–2017	Fifa Manjeri		
2018–2019	Royal Travels FC Black & White Kozhikode		
2021-	Fifa Manjeri		
- * Club domestic league appearances and goals as of 18:00, 30 August 2018 (UTC)

Shahabaz Saleel (born 31 May 1990) is an Indian footballer who plays for All India Sevens side Fifa Manjeri. Prior to now he played for Indian Football clubs Viva Kerala FC a first time and ONGC. He is known for his crossing ability, and his work ethic leadership.

== Club career ==
=== Early career ===
Saleel started his career at Tata Football Academy which is India's best footballing academy. He did not manage to graduate Tata but still went on to sign for Viva Kerala FC in 2007.

=== ONGC ===
While Saleel was at ONGC F.C. who he signed with in 2008, he drew praise as one of the best young defenders in India. Although he only managed four games at ONGC FC, it was Saleel's performance in the reserves that generated the most attention.

=== Chirag United Kerala ===
On 21 July 2011 Saleel reportedly signed with Kerala club Chirag United Club Kerala for the second time in his career. He scored his first goal for the club on 24 November 2011 against Pailan Arrows on the I-League.

=== Quartz Soccer Club ===
On 26 September 2012, it was announced that Sabas Saleel had signed for Quartz S.C. for the 2012 I-League 2nd Division.

== International ==
After a great season for Saleel with ONGC FC in the I-League he was selected for the Indian U-23 football team which was to play two 2012 Olympic qualifiers against Qatar. He however did not feature in either match.

== Stats ==
Games, Goals, and Assists are correct as of 5 May 2012

Club	Season	League			Cup			Asia			Total		
Club	Season	Apps	Goals	Assists	Apps	Goals	Assists	Apps	Goals	Assists	Apps	Goals	Assists
ONGC FC	2010-11	4	0	0	0	0	0	0	0	0	4	0	0
Chirag United Club Kerala	2011-12	13	1	0	0	0	0	0	0	0	13	1	0
Career total		17	1	0	0	0	0	0	0	0	17	1	0
