= Kalyani Bharat FC =

Former Indian professional association football club

- Full name: Kalyani Bharat Football Club
- Nickname: The Lions
- Founded: 26 August 2014; 12 years ago
- Dissolved: 2015; 11 years ago
- Ground: Balewadi Sports Complex
- Capacity: 12,000
- Owner: Kalyani Group
Home colours	Away colours	Third colours

Kalyani Bharat Football Club (also known as Bharat FC) was an Indian professional football club based in Pune, Maharashtra. Founded in 2014, the club usually competed in I-League, then top tier of Indian football league system. The team was founded on 26 August 2014 by Kalyani Group as a direct-entry team into the I-League, making them the second direct-entry side in league history after Bengaluru FC.

The name of the team, as well as their home stadium, the Balewadi Sports Complex, were officially announced on 23 November 2014. But after a disappointing season in I-League the club withdrew and was eventually dissolved.

== History ==
In 2013, in a bid to increase the popularity of the I-League – India's top football league – the All India Football Federation approved the addition of teams into the league via bidding for a direct-entry slot. The first two teams to be allowed into the I-League via direct-entry were Bengaluru FC and Mumbai Tigers but only Bengaluru FC played in the 2013–14 season. Despite the failure of Mumbai Tigers, Bengaluru FC proved to be an amazing success for the I-League as the Bangalore club managed to bring in full-houses to all their matches as well as even win the league in their very first season. This thus made the AIFF announce that they would be accepting bids for new direct-entry teams for the 2014–15 season. On 26 August 2014, after the AIFF reviewed the bidders, they announced that Kalyani Group had won the right to start a direct-entry club for the 2014–15 season.

After winning the bid for the team, in November 2014, Kalyani Group signed their first ever head coach for the football team in former Wolverhampton Wanderers player Stuart Watkiss. They also appointed Stanley Rozario as assistant coach. Kalyani Group then signed their first ever player on 10 November 2014 when New Zealand international Kris Bright signed for the club, who also represented New Zealand at the 2010 FIFA World Cup. After making their first signings, the Kalyani Group officially announced the name of the club on 23 November 2014 as Bharat FC.

The club started the season with two friendlies against Bombay Engineer Group, which they won 3–0, and the second one 5–0, courtesy two goals from Steven Dias and a goal each from Subhash Singh, Surojit Bose and Jayashelan Prasad. In the last friendly before the season, Bharat FC played against Air India and managed a 2–2 draw with a goal each from Kris Bright and Gunashekar Vignesh.

=== 2014–15 I-League ===
The 2014–15 I-League was their first and only top flight season, they ever competed. For their maiden season, The Lions signed experienced foreigners like Englishman Bobby Hassell, New Zealander Kris Bright. They rope in Beninese Romuald Boco as Marquee player, who earned 50 caps for his country. Palestinian Omar Jarun was also signed in March 2015 for an 18-month deal completing the club's Asian player quota.

In their first ever league match, the debutants held Dempo SC to a goalless draw. Later they defeated giants Mohun Bagan AC by 1–0. On 27 January 2015, Bright scored the first goal for his club, netting a 14th-minute goal against Royal Wahingdoh but they lost the game by 1–2. Kris Bright emerged as the top goalscorer for Bharat with 6 goals in the league.

Bharat FC has competed in 20 matches in the league season and managed to win only 3 matches alongside 10 draws and 7 defeats. Thus the club finished at the bottom of the league table with 18 points, behind Dempo. But they were not relegated as they had relegation immunity for two years.

== Colours and kits ==
During the club's first ever kit launch event on 2 January 2015, it was announced that the club's colours would be based on the team's motto, "Together, Forever and Triumphant", which are blue, red, and white. The home kit was coloured in dark blue which stands for the "Peoples Football" while the away kit is predominantly red. The club's third kit was coloured completely white with the colours blue and red running horizontally across the shirt. The red denotes "passion and vitality" while blue stands for "truth and loyalty".

== Ownership ==
Bharat FC was formed through an initiative by Kalyani Group, a privately held industrial group, headquartered in Pune, Maharashtra, India, that is focused in four primary sectors, viz. Engineering Steel, Automotive & Non-Automotive Components, Renewable Energy & Infrastructure and Specialty Chemicals. Amit Kalyani was the club's first and only managing director.

== Kit manufacturers and shirt sponsors ==
Period	Kit manufacturer	Shirt sponsor
2015	Nivia	Kalyani Group

== Stadium ==
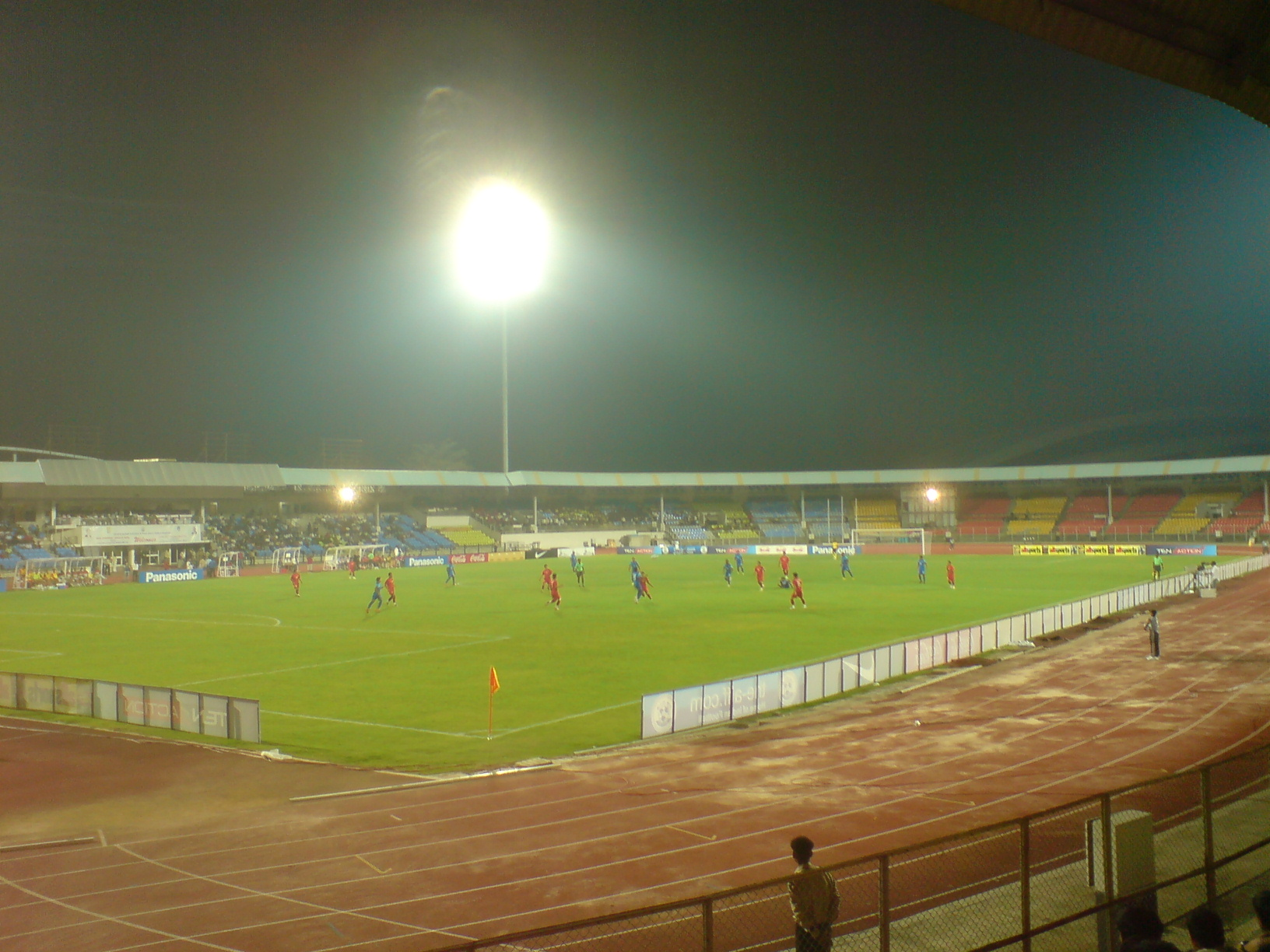
Shiv Chatrapati Sports Complex on a matchday

When Bharat FC's name was announced, the Balewadi Sports Complex was also announced as the first ever stadium to be used by the club. The stadium has a capacity of 12,000. The team has stated their intention to eventually construct their own football stadium with Manjri being the initial looked at location for the stadium.

== Disfunction ==
The team was officially launched in November 2014, but despite investing heavily, Bharat FC just managed to gain only 18 points from 20 games in the 2014–15 I-League season, finishing at the bottom. The return on investment being abysmal, the club didn't see I-League as an economically viable investment anymore. With minimal activity ahead of their second season and several staff, including CEO Suvrat Thatte, resigning, the Pune-based club only played one season in the I-League.

== Team records ==
=== Overall records ===
As of 5 January 2015

Season	I-League								Federation Cup	Durand Cup	AFC	Top Scorer	
Season	P	W	L	D	GF	GA	Pts	Position	Federation Cup	Durand Cup	AFC	Player	Goals
2014–15	20	4	6	10	13	28	18	11th	—	—	—	Kris Bright	6

=== Head coach's record ===
As of 6 January 2015

Name	Nationality	From	To	P	W	D	L	GF	GA	Win%	Ref.
Stuart Watkiss	England	4 November 2014	1 June 2015	20	4	6	10	13	28	20.00	

=== Technical staffs ===
As of 6 January 2015

Position	Name
Head coach	(England) Stuart Watkiss
Assistant coach	(India) Stanley Rozario
Fitness coach	(England) Lindsay Davis
Physiotherapist	(England) Ian Farmery

== Notable players ==
For all former notable Bharat FC players with a Wikipedia article, see: Kalyani Bharat FC players.

=== World Cup player ===
- (New Zealand) Kris Bright (2015)

== See also ==
- List of football clubs in Maharashtra
- Defunct football clubs in India
- Sports in Maharashtra
