= Stanley Rozario =

Indian football manager

Personal information
- Full name: Henry Stanley Rozario
- Date of birth: 22 April 1960 (age 66)
- Place of birth: Bangalore, India

Managerial career
- Years: Team
- 2004–2006: Services
- 2006–2008: India (assistant)
- 2008–2009: East Bengal
- 2009: Salgaocar
- 2009–2010: Shillong Lajong
- 2010–2011: Mohun Bagan
- 2011–2012: United Sikkim
- 2013–2014: Eagles
- 2014–2015: Bharat (assistant)
- 2017: Ozone Academy
- 2019–2021: Aizawl
- 2022: Aizwal

Henry Stanley Rozario (born 22 April 1960) is an Indian professional manager and former footballer. He was most recently the head coach of I-League club Aizawl.

He managed top clubs in India with teams based in Kolkata, Goa, Shillong, Sikkim, Kerala, Pune and Bangaluru. He was also assistant coach with senior national team of India and other clubs for World Cup Qualifying, Olympic Qualifying, Asian Games, AFC Cup, AFC Challenge Cup, SAFF Championship, Nehru Cup and other international competitions.

== Coaching career ==
Born in Bangalore, Stanley Rozario began his coaching career as coach of Services Team and Indian Army XI team in India. After spending many years as head coach of Army XI and Services, Rozario signed with the AIFF (All India Football Federation) as assistant coach of the India national football team under Bob Houghton in 2006.

After another two years as assistant coach to India, Rozario signed as a full-time head coach at East Bengal FC in the I-League. After one season though Rozario joined as head coach of Salgaocar where he lasted one year and promoted the team to top tier I League.

Then he join as head coach of Shillong Lajong FC in June 2009 and made the team to reach finals in Federation Cup. After a good performance with Shillong Lajong, Rozario was appointed as head coach of Mohun Bagan on 4 June 2010, which reached the finals in Federation Cup and Calcutta League.

He then signed with United Sikkim FC in February 2011 and then he was head coach of Eagles FC Kerala for one season.

On 4 November 2014 He was appointed as assistant coach of English coach Stuart Watkiss to new entrants Bharat FC.

In 2017 Stanley Rozario joined as director of youth development of Ozone Football Academy.

On 9 January 2019, I-League football club Aizawl announced Stanley as their head coach. In January 2021, it was announced that Aizawl has mutually parted ways with Rozario.

== Statistics ==
=== Managerial statistics ===
As of 9 January 2021

Team	From	To	Record				
Team	From	To	G	W	D	L	Win %
(India) Aizawl	9 January 2019	18 January 2021	25	7	10	8	28.00
(India) Aizawl	24 August 2022	7 December 2022	5	1	2	2	20.00
Total			30	8	12	10	26.67
