= SP-52 (São Paulo highway) =

State highway in São Paulo, Brazil

SP-052

Route information
- Length: 26.2 km (16.3 mi)

Location
- Country: Brazil
- State: São Paulo

Highway system
- Highways in Brazil; Federal; São Paulo State Highways

SP-52 is a highway in the northeastern part of the state of São Paulo in Brazil. The highway runs from the city of Cruzeiro up to the boundary with Minas Gerais.
