= SP-58 (São Paulo highway) =

State highway in São Paulo, Brazil

SP-058

Route information
- Length: 40.2 km (25.0 mi)

Location
- Country: Brazil
- State: São Paulo

Highway system
- Highways in Brazil; Federal; São Paulo State Highways

The SP-58 is a highway in the northeastern part of the state of São Paulo in Brazil. The highway is known as Deputado Nesralla Rubez. The highway runs from the city of Cachoeira Paulista with the BR-116 and Cruzeiro with the same highway number.

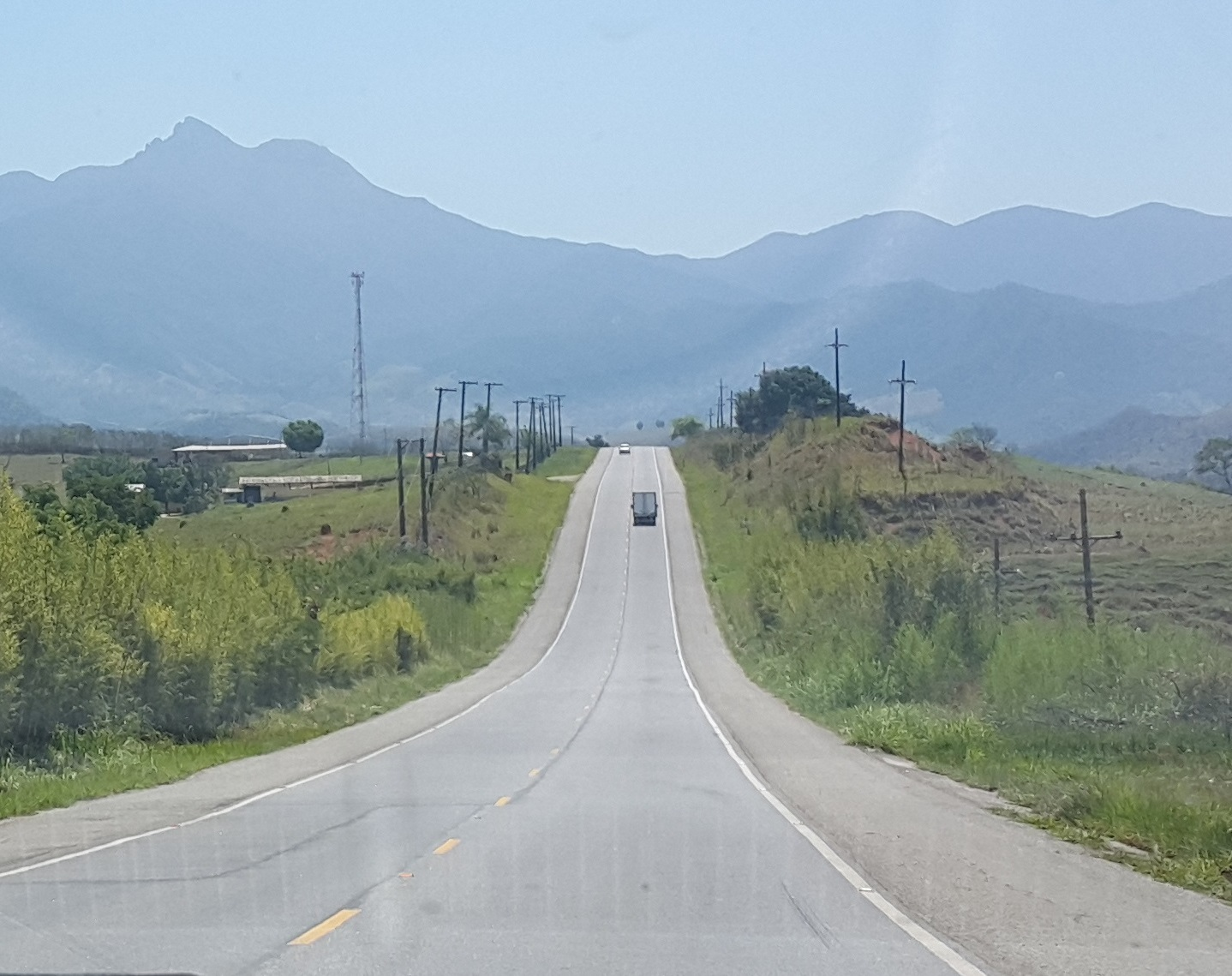
SP-58
