= Suamargad =

Fort in the Ratnagiri District

Sumargad Fort
- Ratnagiri district, Maharashtra, India

Site information
- Owner: Government of India
- Open to the public: Yes
- Condition: Ruins

Location
- Location of Sumargad, Maharashtra
- Coordinates: 17°48′30.5″N 73°30′42.9″E
- Height: 883 m (2,897 ft 0 in)

Site history
- Materials: Stone

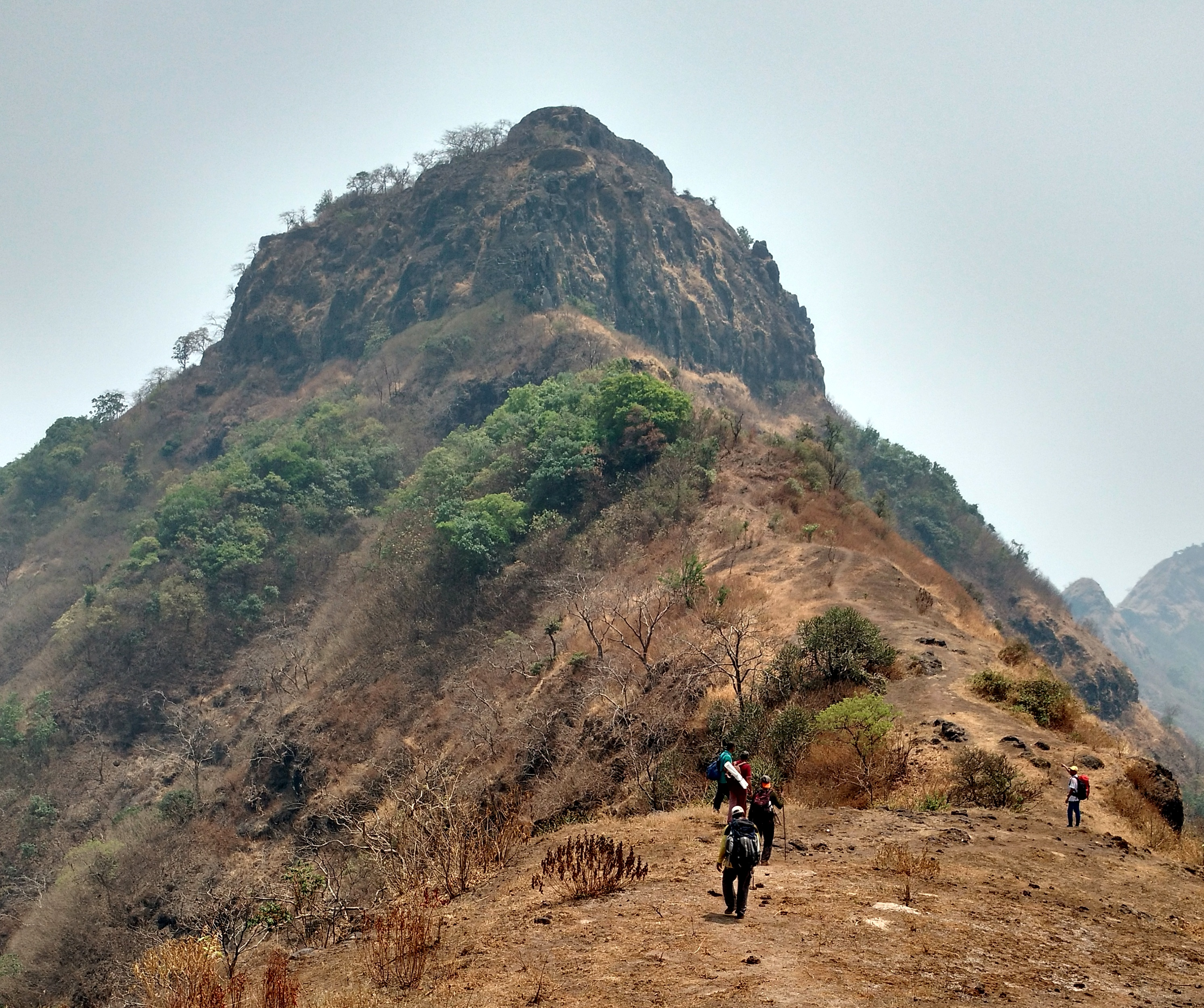
Fort

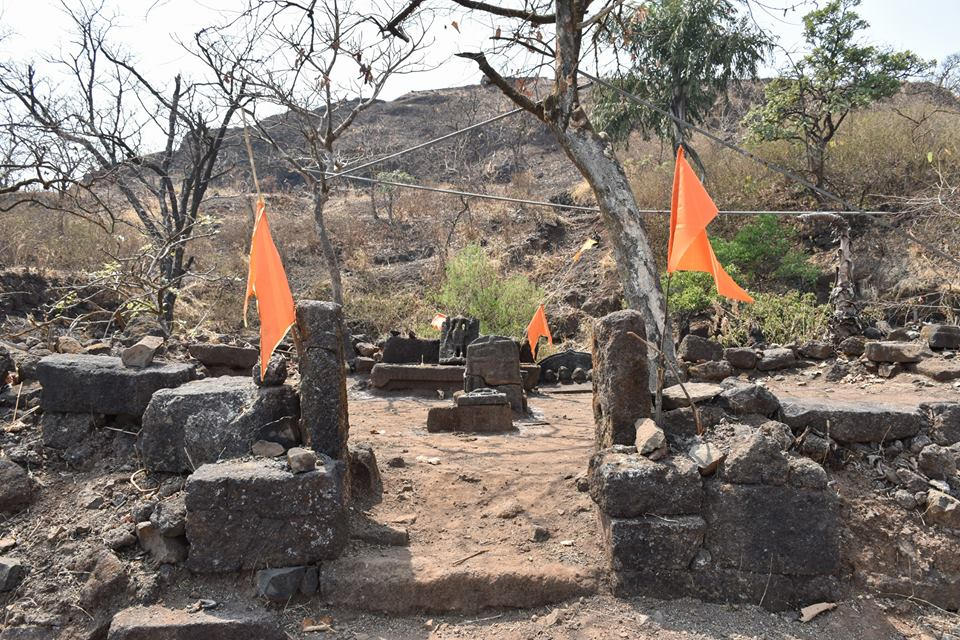
Top of the fort

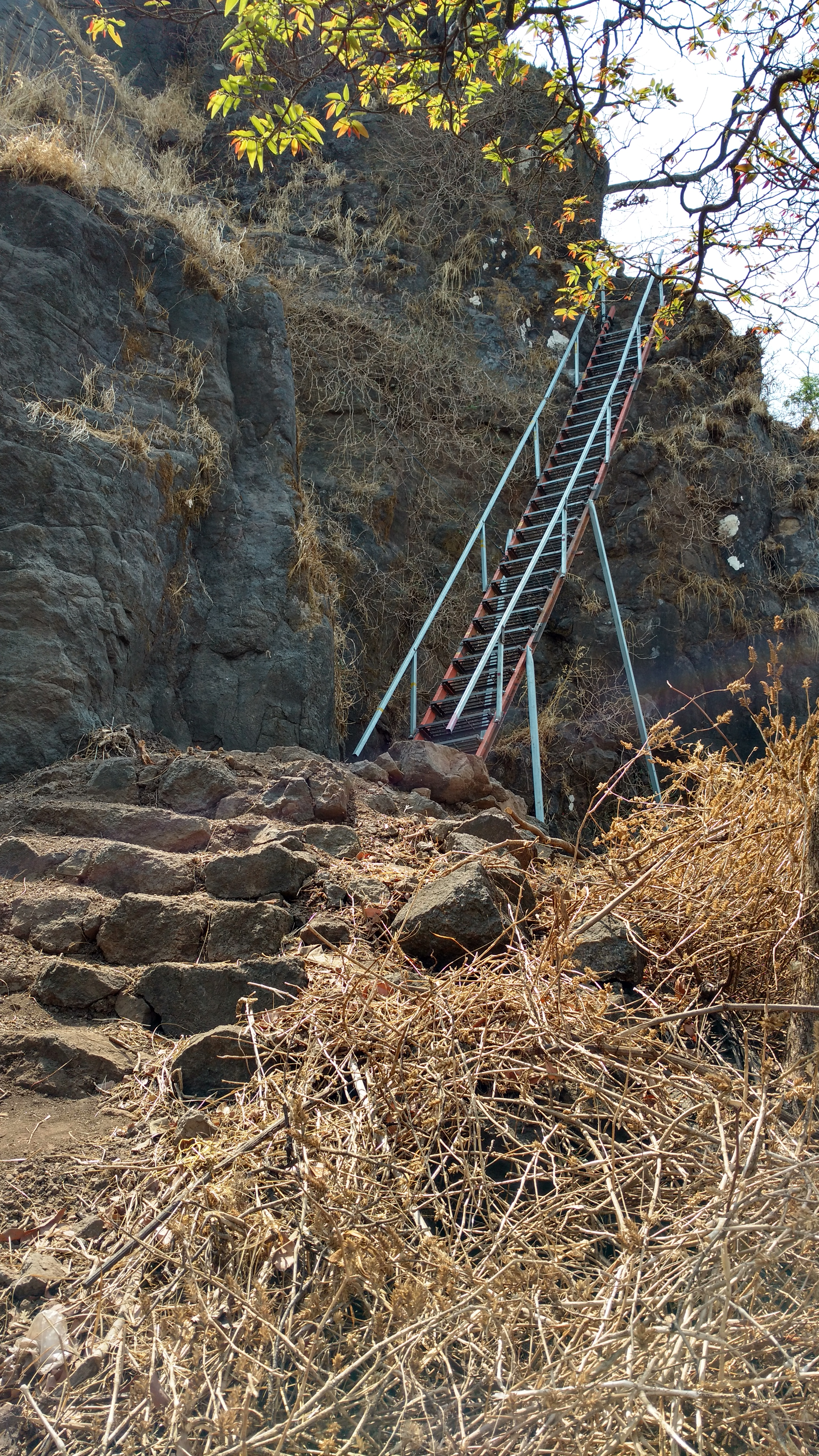
Ladder

Sumargad is a less-visited fort in the Ratnagiri district. This fort lies east of the Khed. It is about 19 kilometres (12 mi) from Khed City. There are no human settlements around the fort. There are two ways to reach Sumargad; one from Mahipatgad and the other from Rasalgad. The trek to this fort is through remote forest area. Very little history is known about this fort.

The fort has steep cliffs on all sides. It is a very small fort, with fortification over an area of 1–2 acres. There are many rock-cut water cisterns on the fort. Only two cisterns have clear potable water. There is a cave on the fort with Shivalinga. From the top of the fort Mahipatgad, Rasalgad, Chakdev and Parvatgad can be seen.
