= Mahipatgad =

Hill fort in Maharashtra, India

Mahipatgad Fort
- Ratnagiri district, Maharashtra
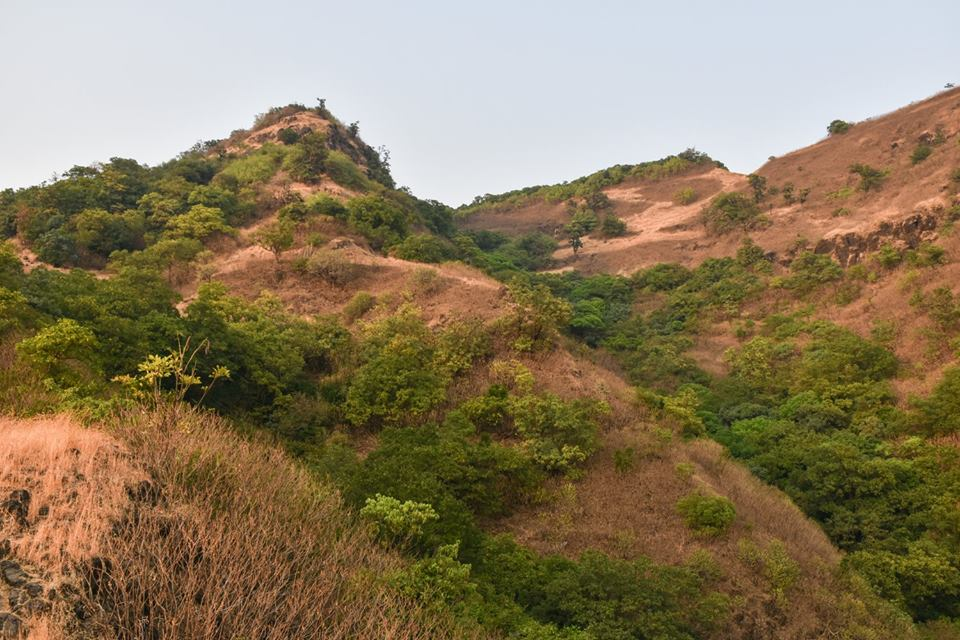
- Fort seen from Wadibeldar

Site information
- Type: Hill fort
- Owner: Government of India
- Open to the public: Yes
- Condition: Ruins

Location
- Shown within Maharashtra
- Coordinates: 17°50′20.1″N 73°29′55.4″E

Site history
- Built: Unknown
- Materials: Stone
- Demolished: 1818

Mahipatgad is a hill fort situated on the east of the Khed. It is one of the largest forts in Maharashtra, with an area of 120 acres. This fort is located 23.6 km from the Khed City. The Mahipatgad. Suamargad and Rasalgad are situated on a same spur 8 km long, which runs parallel to the Western Ghats. The Mahipatgad is on the northernmost end of the spur. The altitude of Mahipatgad is 3490 feet.

== History ==
This fort was built by Adilshah of Bijapur in the 15th century. This fort was captured by King Shivaji in 1661. Later it passed to the Peshwas and finally to the British in 1818. There are 18 houses in the Beldarvadi village, which is at the foot hill of the fort.

== Places to see ==
The Mahipatgad looks like a hill-top covered with dense forest of Jamun, Pisa and similar trees found at higher altitude similar to that of Mahabaleshwar. There are Leopards, Wild pigs, Jagur, Mouse deer, Porcupine, Hayenas, Hornbill and barking deer on the fort. ( Beware Of Snakes )

The fort is a table land with six battlements and six gateways. The gateways are in a mint condition. The gateways are:

- Laldevdi, on north-eastern side
- Pusati, on eastern side, formerly entered by a ladder
- Yeshwant, on south-eastern side
- Khed, towards southern side; this route is still in use and connects the village Beldarwadi to the fort
- Shivganga, on western side; there is a rock cut shivling near this entrance
- Kotwal, on northern side; the pathway from this gate leads to the village Kotwal in Poladpur taluka

Here the foundation of temples of Maruti and Ganapati are seen with half walls still standing. On the southern side of the fort are remnants of horse stables which are 530–850 in numbers. There are two heaps of unused mortar on the fort. There are two large wells on the fort, one near the Khed entrance and the other near Pareshwar temple. The water from these wells is used for drinking by the trekkers. The best time to visit the fort is from December to January.

== How to reach ==
There is a new road built up to the village Wadibeldar. At present one can reach by private vehicle to the village Wadi-beldar. From this village there is a steep track of one hours to the top of fort first step and then the track to the fort is about 25 minutes. The Pareshwar temple is the only option for halting at night on fort.

== Gallery ==
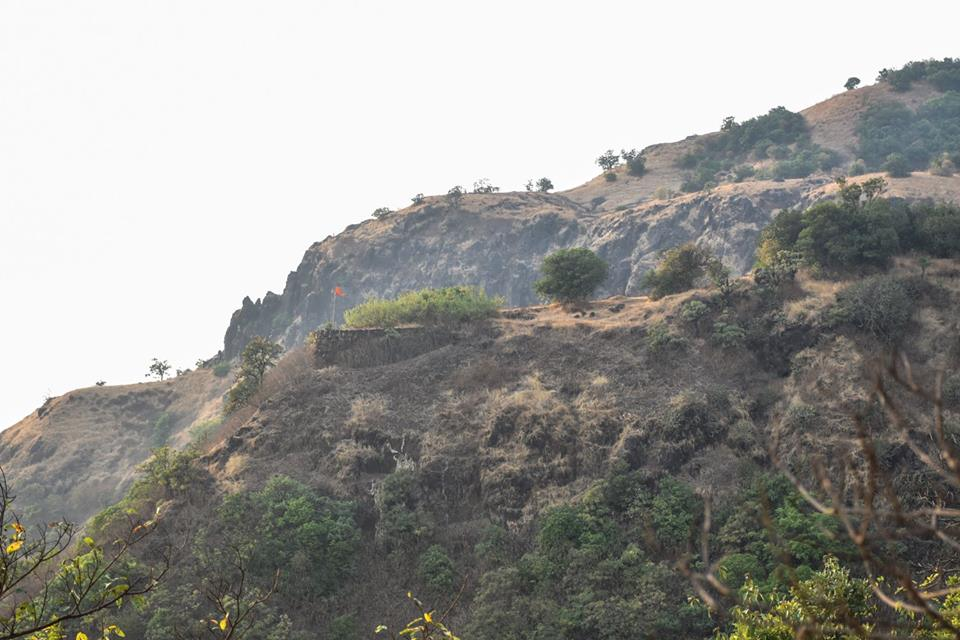
Southern Bastion

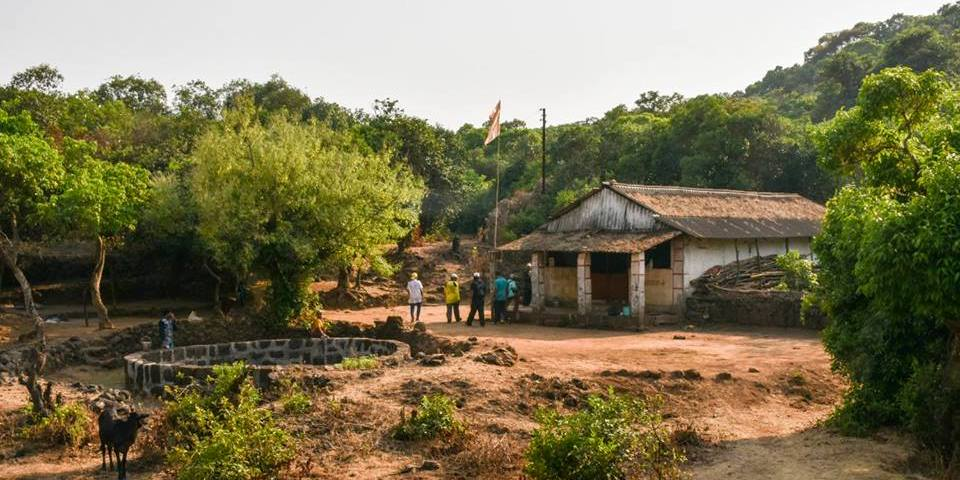
Pareshwar temple

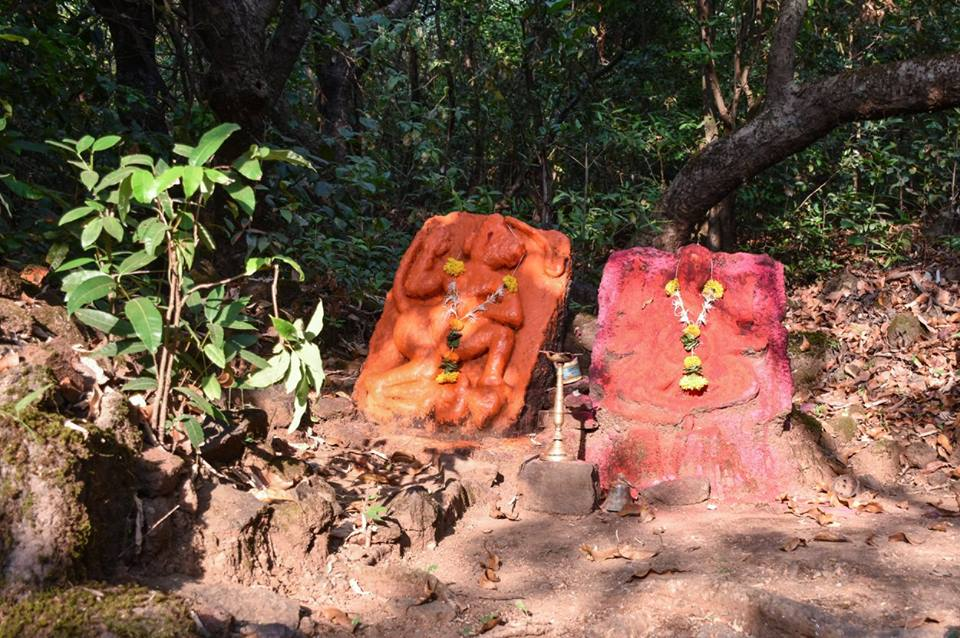
Maruti and Ganpati idol

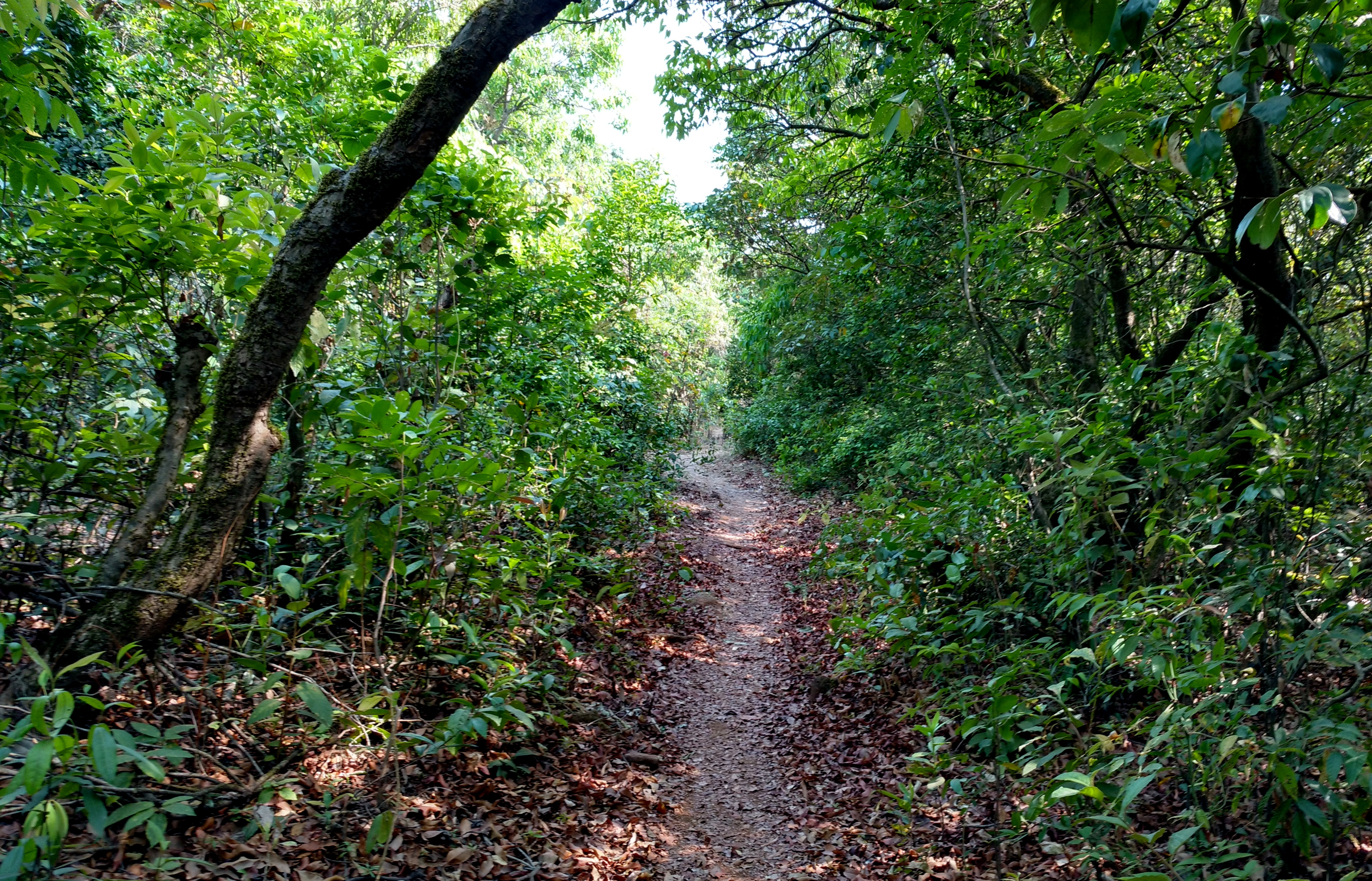
Jungle on the fort

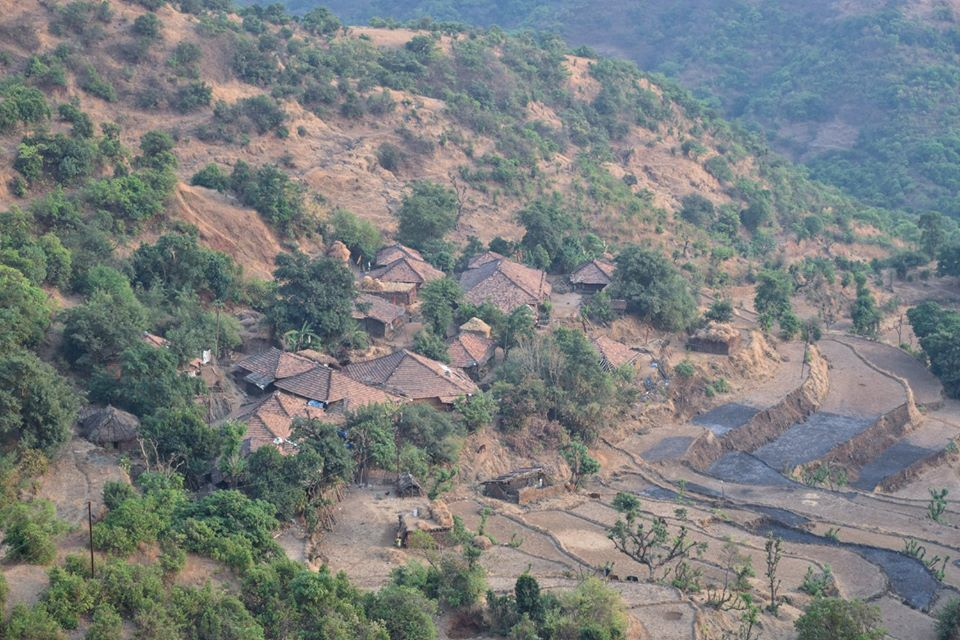
Wadibeldar village from the fort
