= Surojit Bose =

Indian footballer (born 1986)

Personal information
- Date of birth: 19 December 1986 (age 39)
- Place of birth: Kolkata, West Bengal, India
- Height: 1.78 m (5 ft 10 in)
- Position: Forward

Team information
- Current team: United S.C.
- Number: 39

Senior career*
Years	Team	Apps	(Gls)
2004–2005	Tollygunge Agragami	19	(5)
2005–2006	Mahindra United	14	(1)
2006–2007	Mohun Bagan		
2007–2010	Mahindra United		
2010–2011	ONGC		
2011–2012	Mohammedan	2	(0)
2012–2013	Mumbai Tigers		
2013–2014	United	9	(0)
2014–	Bharat FC	8	(1)

International career^{‡}
2005	India	3	(0)
- * Club domestic league appearances and goals as of 30 May 2015 ‡ National team caps and goals as of 14 June 2014

Surojit Bose (born 19 December 1986) is an Indian footballer from Kolkata who currently plays for Mumbai Tigers. He has previously played for Mahindra United in the I-League, and for Bengal in the Santosh Trophy. Before joining Mahindra United, he played for Tollygunge Agragami and Mohun Bagan. Apart from football, he is a big fan of driving.
