= Jayashelan Prasad =

Indian footballer (born 1988)

Personal information
- Full name: Jayashelan Prasad
- Date of birth: 26 May 1988 (age 38)
- Place of birth: Bangalore, Karnataka, India
- Height: 1.77 m (5 ft 9 1/2 in)
- Position: Striker

Senior career*
Years	Team	Apps	(Gls)
2008–2012	Pune	31	(0)
2012−13	Quartz S.C.		
2013−14	Mohammedan	0	(0)
2014	→ Bhawanipore (On loan)		
2014–15	Bharat	5	(0)
- * Club domestic league appearances and goals as of 30 May 2015

Jayashelan Prasad (born 26 May 1988) is an Indian footballer who last played for Bharat FC.

== Career ==
=== Pune ===
Jayashelan joined Pune F.C. during 2008. He was selected to play for the Pune FC senior team during the II-Division I-League campaign in 2008. When playing for Pune FC in his first year he announced his name by scoring against Sesa, Goa in Gurgaon. The goal was one of the three goals Pune FC had scored in the tournament to make it to the I League from the Second Division.

=== Quartz Soccer Club ===
On 26 September 2012, it was announced that J.Prasad had signed for Quartz S.C. for the 2012 I-League 2nd Division.
