= Khed City =

Indian industrial park

KHED CITY
- Type: Private
- Founded: 2010
- Founder: Baba Kalyani
- Headquarters: Pune Maharashtra, India
- Area served: 4200 Acre
- Website: https://www.khedcity.com/

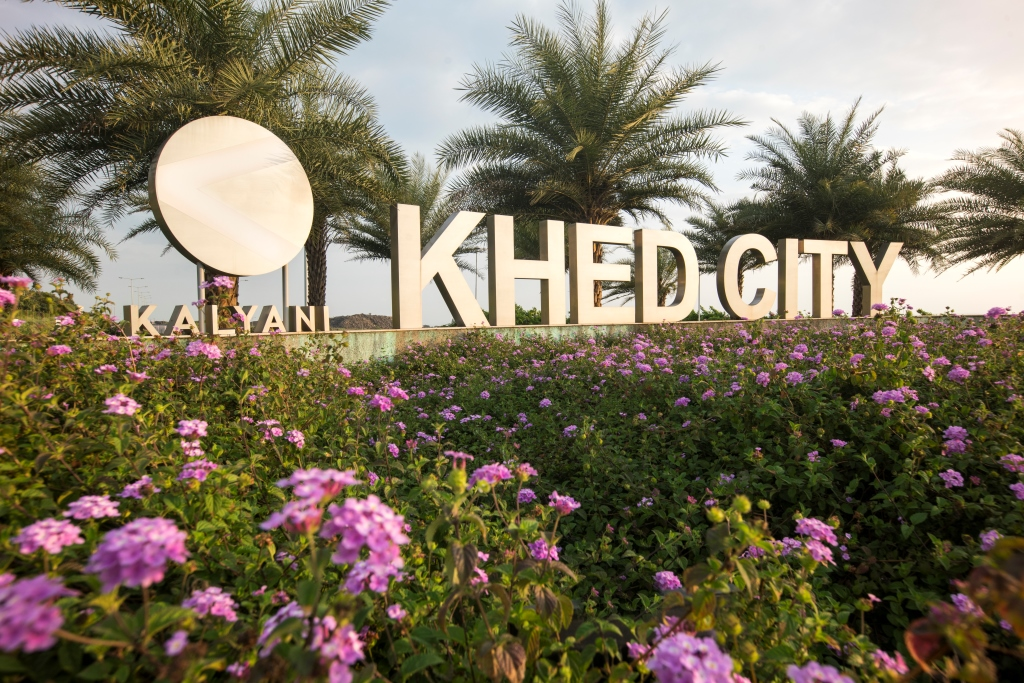
Entrance gate

Khed City is an Industrial park near Pune, India. With an area of over 4200 acres, Khed city is a joint venture between Kalyani group and MIDC (Maharashtra Industrial Development Corporation).

== History ==
Khed City came into existence in the year 2010. Khed City, was formed under Khed Economic Infrastructure Ltd (KEIPL), which is a joint venture between Maharashtra Industrial Development Corporation (MIDC) and Kalyani Group.

== Civic Administration ==
The 4200 acres of land is divided into Domestic Tariff Area, a sector specific SEZ (Engineering and Electronic sector), and social infrastructure along with a rehabilitation and resettlement area for the displaced locals. It falls under the ‘C’ zone as per the Maharashtra Industrial policy 2013. The Non-industrial area has a provision of support services including academic, social, entertainment, healthcare, and other facilities for its citizens.

== Geography ==
Khed City is located in Khed Taluka of Pune district, at an altitude of approximately 2,100 feet above sea level, at the intersection of Western Ghats and the Deccan Plateaus. It is situated between the latitudes of approximately 18.8405° North and 73.9072° East.

== Languages ==
Marathi is the official and most spoken language, while English, Hindi, Gujarati and Kannada are spoken by a considerable part of the population. Majority of the residents know at least 3 different languages.

== Economy ==
As of 2019, Khed City has over 47 domestic and multinational companies. Mars International, the wholly owned subsidiary of Mars Inc. Has invested around 1000 Crore for their chocolate manufacturing plant. Hyosung T&D, a subsidiary of the South Korean Automotive manufacturer, Hyosung Corps, has a green field manufacturing unit in 14 Acres. Maxion wheels, a worlds leader in automotive wheel manufacturing, has invested around Rs. 350 Crore for their 20 Acre manufacturing unit. Amul India has invested in an ice cream manufacturing facility, on eleven acres of land. Kalyani Transmission Technologies Ltd (KTTL), a division of Kalyani Technoforge Ltd (KTFL), have their manufacturing facility in Khed City, Pune. Other major names include JSW MI Steel, Lenze Mechatronics, Linnhoff India, Hira Technologies, Maico Ventilation

== Transportation ==
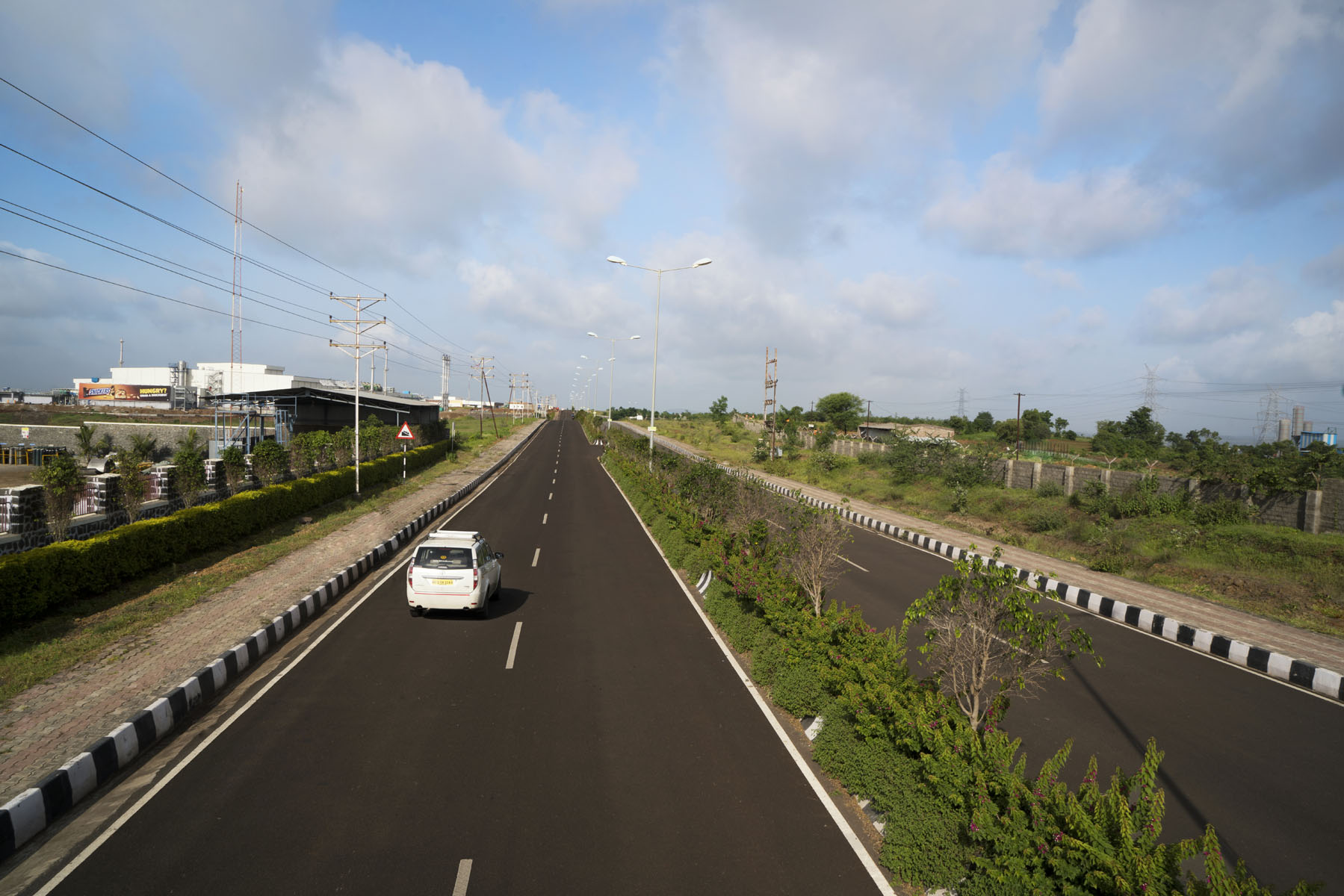
Transportation

=== Public transportation ===
Public transportation in Pune includes Pune Suburban Railway, bus services operated by PMPML and auto rickshaws. Online transport network companies such as Uber and Ola Cabs also provide rideshare and taxi services in the city. The Pune Metro, an urban mass rapid transit system, was inaugerated in 2024. Distance between Khed City and Pune Railway Station – 53 km Distance between Khed City and Pune Airport – 50 km Distance between Khed City and JNPT – 146 km

==== Pune-Nashik railway corridor ====
The Maharashtra state government has recently announced the proposal of connecting Pune & Nashik via a 231 km railway line. According to the Maharashtra Railway Infrastructure Development Limited, the laying of tracks will commence from Feb 2019. Once complete, It will be used not only by passengers but also for transporting agricultural and industrial goods.
