= Kris Bright =

New Zealand footballer (born 1986)

Personal information
- Full name: Kris William Bright
- Date of birth: 5 September 1986 (age 40)
- Place of birth: Manukau, Auckland, New Zealand
- Height: 1.89 m (6 ft 2 in)
- Position: Striker

Team information
- Current team: Auckland City (Sporting Director)

Senior career*
Years	Team	Apps	(Gls)
2004–2005	Waitakere City	22	(30)
2005–2006	New Zealand Knights	11	(1)
2006–2007	Fortuna Sittard	11	(1)
2007–2008	Kristiansund	24	(28)
2009	Panserraikos	7	(1)
2009–2010	Shrewsbury Town	27	(3)
2011	Budapest Honvéd	10	(2)
2011	Balzan Youths	11	(5)
2012	Bryne FK	12	(4)
2012–2013	FC Haka	13	(3)
2013	IFK Mariehamn	23	(9)
2014	Lincoln City	7	(2)
2015	Bharat	17	(6)
2015–2016	Bidvest Wits	3	(1)
2016–2017	Linfield	6	(0)
2017–2018	Auckland City	5	(1)

International career
	New Zealand U-17	7	(6)
	New Zealand U-20	5	(4)
2008–2013	New Zealand	5	(1)

Managerial career
- 2019–2020: Central United
- 2020–: Auckland City U23
- * Club domestic league appearances and goals as of 08:49, 9 April 2018 (UTC)

Kris Bright (born 5 September 1986) is a retired New Zealand footballer who is the current sporting director of New Zealand club Auckland City.

== Career ==
Born in South Auckland, New Zealand, the son of New Zealand 1982 World Cup representative Dave Bright. Bright started as a Semi-Professional with Waitakere City in 2004. Whilst with Waitakere, Bright was the 2004 top scorer in the Lotto Sport Italia NRFL Premier as a 17-year-old, and played in the club's 0–1 loss to Miramar Rangers in the final of the 2004 Chatham Cup. Over 1 1/2 seasons with Waitakere City, Bright scored a total of 29 goals.

In mid-2005, Bright was named as one of three players in the New Zealand Knights' apprenticeship scheme. Shortly after the start of the season, though, Knights player Neil Emblen was forced onto the injured list, which would allow the club to sign Bright as a replacement for four weeks. Bright was rushed into the squad to play the Central Coast Mariners at North Harbour Stadium, and produced a Man of the Match performance as he played the full 90 minutes on debut as the New Zealand side went down 1–3. Bright's performance in his first match earned praise from Knights manager John Adshead, and he was rewarded with a starting place in the following match against the Newcastle United Jets. Bright appeared in the Knights's following four games up until Emblen's return from injury, but had done enough to retain his position in the squad, having signed another short-term contract, this time to cover for Joshua Rose. By the end of the 2005–06 season, Bright had made a total of 12 appearances, three from the substitutes bench. In mid-2006, Bright was asked to trial at Scottish side Kilmarnock, where he was for a month, playing three games and scoring two goals. Although he was not signed by Kilmarnock, Dutch Eerste Divisie club Fortuna Sittard, invited Bright to a trial match against FC Geleen-Zuid where he scored one goal. Bright subsequently landed a one-year contract with the club, with the option of a further year.

Bright managed to gain a spot in the starting line-up for the struggling Dutch side. He played in eleven league games, in which he scored one goal, against HFC Haarlem. After interest from Norway, he signed a six-month contract until the end of the Norwegian season with Norwegian club Kristiansund BK. There he scored an amazing 11 goals in eight games until his season was ended prematurely. With two games remaining in the season and several Norwegian Tippeligaen & Adeccoligaen clubs following his progress, Bright suffered a broken leg. Bright then renewed his contract with Kristiansund BK until January 2009.

After six months of recovery, Bright then made his return in the 2008 season opener against Strindheim. He continued his goal scoring form with two goals including a 25-metre free-kick to help Kristiansund to a 3–1 win. After playing 12 games, he was top goal-scorer in the league with 10 goals. Also, in the 3rd round of the Norwegian Cup, Bright scored KBK's only goal against Tippeligaen club & close rivals Molde F.K. in a 2–1 extra-time loss.

After a season full of goals again in Norway, Bright had done enough to sign a 1 1/2-year contract with Greek Super League side Panserraikos, he was given the number 32 shirt. He left the Club in July 2009 by mutual consent with a year remaining on his contract due to unpaid wages, and joined English League Two side Shrewsbury Town on 3 August 2009.

In November 2009, Bright scored the winner in a 2–1 win over AFC Telford United in the Shropshire Senior Cup final. He scored his first Football League goal against Lincoln City, then scored another on the final day of the season against Port Vale. He made a total of 26 league appearances in the 2009–10 season, including 22 from the bench, scoring three goals.

After interest from Hungary earlier in the year, and with a new manager arriving at Shrewsbury Town, Bright then found himself signing a 2 1/2-year deal with former Hungarian giants Honved Budapest on a free transfer. Unfortunately at the end of the first season at the club, and with the club having huge financial difficulties and unable to pay full wages, Bright was to find a new club.

On 3 October 2011 Bright joined Maltese club Balzan Youths on a short-term deal. Bright linked up with Balzan until December before he made the move to Bryne FK in Norway in January. Bright accepted the offer of joining Balzan so that he could maintain his match fitness prior to the move to Bryne. The move was a success helping the recently promoted side to a top six finish scoring five crucial goals in 10 starts for the club. The 25-year-old had agreed a pre-contract with Bryne and joined up on 1 January 2012.

After half a season in Bryne, Bright then found himself playing in an unaccustomed midfield role. With the team struggling in the league, limited opportunities as a striker, and offers from other teams, Bright signed a short-term deal on 2 August with FC Haka in the Finland Premier League. Bright cited his reasons for leaving were "to get regular playing time as a striker to score goals". In March 2013 Bright signed a deal with IFK Mariehamn in the Finland Premier League for the whole season of 2013.

On 8 March 2014, it was announced Bright had signed for Lincoln City for the rest of the season.

On 10 November 2014, he signed for the newly formed club Bharat FC of the I-League. On 27 January 2015, he scored the first goal for his club, netting a 14th-minute goal against Royal Wahingdoh.

On 10 July 2015, he signed for Bidvest Wits of the ABSA Premiership in South Africa. He scored and bagged an assist on debut for Bidvest Wits.

On 23 August 2016, Bright signed for Northern Irish club Linfield on a one-year contract. After being sparingly used, he returned to New Zealand on 21 September 2017, signing for Auckland City.

== International career ==
Bright has represented New Zealand at under-15, under-16, under-17 and under-20 levels. He played in all of New Zealand's matches during their failed qualifying campaign for the 2003 FIFA U-17 World Championship, scoring four goals, including a hat-trick in a 13–0 win over Tonga. In 2005, Bright was selected for the under-20 squad to compete in the OFC qualifying tournament for the 2005 FIFA World Youth Championship, but again the country were unable to make the finals, finishing third in their group behind the Solomon Islands and Fiji. His senior international debut for the All whites was a substitute appearance in 2008 for a 2010 FIFA World Cup qualifier against Fiji, and his first senior international goal was against Thailand on 28 March 2009. He was included in the 2009 FIFA Confederations Cup squad, making a single appearance as a substitute against European champions, Spain. He missed out on the final 23-man squad for the 2010 FIFA World Cup, but was named as one of seven non-travelling reserves.

International goals
#	Date	Opponent	Final Result	Result	Competition
1	28 March 2009	Thailand	3–1	Loss	Friendly
Last updated 7 April 2010
