= Baba Kalyani =

Indian businessman

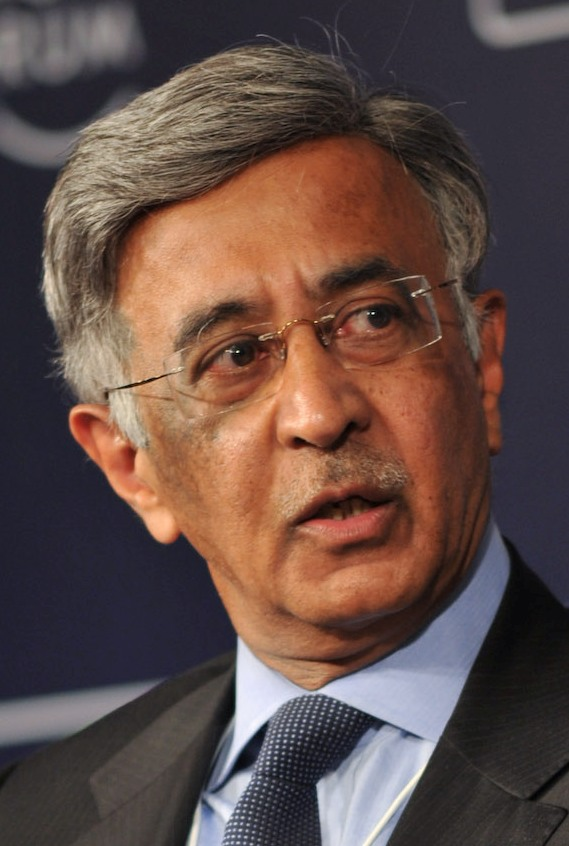
- Kalyani at the World Economic Forum's India Economic Summit 2009.
- Born: 7 January 1949 (age 77); Pune, Bombay State, Dominion of India (present day Maharashtra, India)
- Education: Rashtriya Military School, Belgaum; Birla Institute of Technology and Science, Pilani; Massachusetts Institute of Technology
- Occupation: Businessman
- Title: Founder and Chairman of Kalyani Group
- Children: Amit Kalyani
- Awards: Padma Bhushan (2008); Order of the Polar Star; Bundesverdienstkreuz (2012)

Babasaheb Neelkanth Kalyani (born 7 January 1949) is an Indian billionaire businessman who served as the chairman and managing director of Bharat Forge, the flagship company of the Kalyani Group and the world's second-largest forging manufacturer after ThyssenKrupp of Germany.

== Early life and education ==
Babasaheb Kalyani was born in a Veerashiva Jangama family on 7 January 1949 to Sulochana and Neelakanth Rao Kalyani, a Pune-based technocrat and maker of automotive components. He completed his high school from Rashtriya Military School, Belgaum; and also attended Dr. (Mrs.) Erin N. Nagarvala School (formerly National Model School), Pune. He attended BITS Pilani, from where he earned a BE (Hons.) in Mechanical Engineering in 1970, and later Massachusetts Institute of Technology where he earned an MS degree.

== Career ==
Baba Kalyani joined Bharat Forge, a global manufacturing company, in 1972.

To contribute to a clean and emission-free environment, Kalyani set up Kenersys Limited to manufacture various energy-efficient wind turbines for domestic and international markets. The company also has its own wind turbines in Maharashtra which generate "green energy" for the group's manufacturing operations. He is also engaged in developing solar energy equipment for the non-conventional energy sector. In a joint venture with KPIT Cummins, Bharat Forge is developing a hybrid solution that would contribute in the country being able to meet its vehicular emission targets.

Kalyani has been a member of the SKF board of directors since 2011. The Government of India constituted a task force under the chairmanship of Baba Kalyani to study policies related to special economic zone (SEZ) on 6 June 2018. On 19 February 2015, the Kalyani Group announced a joint venture with Rafael Advanced Defense Systems of Israel. This joint venture company will be based in India.

== Recognition ==
Kalyani received the Indian government's Padma Bhushan award for contributions to Trade and Industry, and was made Commander First Class of the Royal Order of the Polar Star by the Swedish government in recognition of his contribution in furthering trade and business cooperation between Sweden and India. Other awards include Global Economy Prize, 2009 for Business by Kiel Institute, German Businessman of the Year, 2006 by Business India Magazine, Entrepreneur of the Year 2005 for Manufacturing by Ernst & Young, and CEO of the Year 2004 by the Business Standard group. Kalyani was honored with the Cross of the Order of Merit from the Federal Republic of Germany in 2012.

In April 2021, Forbes estimated his net worth to be around US$2.3 billion. As of 2024, Kalyani is ranked 66th on the Forbes list of India’s 100 richest tycoons with a net worth of $4.8 Billion.

== Philanthropy ==
He is the founder-chairman of Pratham Pune Education Foundation, a "Non-governmental organization(NGO)" that is engaged in providing primary education to children belonging to under-privileged sections of the local community, which was established in 2000.
