= Kalyani Group =

Indian multinational conglomerate

- Type: Private
- Industry: Conglomerate
- Founded: 19 June 1961; 65 years ago in Mumbai
- Founder: Neelkanth Rao Kalyani
- Headquarters: Pune, Maharashtra, India
- Area served: Worldwide
- Key people: Baba Kalyani (Chairman)
- Brands: Bharat Forge; Sharp; Meritor
- Services: Steel; Aerospace; Defence; Automotive; Energy
- Revenue: ▲₹25,339 crore (US$2.7 billion) (FY2015)
- Number of employees: ~10,000

Kalyani Group is an Indian multinational conglomerate, headquartered in Pune, India, founded in 1961. It operates in various key sectors including engineering, steel, automotive and non-automotive components, renewable energy and infrastructure, and specialty chemicals. The group has also expanded its operations into the defense manufacturing sector, which was showcased at the DefExpo 2020.

The group's annual turnover exceeded USD 2.5 billion as of 2011 and has established joint ventures with companies such as Alstom, Carpenter Technology Corporation, Iochpe-Maxion, Meritor, Sharp Corporation, and Rafael Advanced Defense Systems.

== History ==
The Kalyani Group was founded by Neelkanth Rao Kalyani. The group's first company, Bharat Forge, was incorporated on 19 June 1961.

The group is currently chaired by Neelkanth Rao's elder son, Baba Kalyani. Some companies are also promoted by his younger son, Gaurishankar Kalyani and his wife, Rohini Kalyani.

== Companies ==
The group holds key stakes in several companies:

=== Bharat Forge ===
Bharat Forge is the Kalyani Group's first company, founded on 19 June 1961. It manufactures automotive components as well as components for industries such as aerospace, railways, marine, and conventional and non-conventional energy. Bharat Forge is the flagship company of the Kalyani Group and has several subsidiaries. Bharat Forge Kilsta, Bharat Forge CDP, and BF Aluminiumtechnik are the company's Europe-based forging units. Defence manufacturer Kalyani Strategic Systems Ltd. is a wholly owned subsidiary of Bharat Forge. Kalyani Strategic Systems owns a 51% stake in Kalyani Rafael Advanced Systems, a joint venture with Israeli defence company Rafael Advanced Defense Systems.

Kalyani Strategic Systems bought a 51% share in the Indian subsidiary of Zorya Mashproekt. On 9 May 2023, the company signed the acquisition agreement. The acquisition process was finished on 31 December 2023.

=== Sharp India ===
Kalyani Telecommunications & Electronics Pvt. Ltd. was incorporated on 5 July 1985 by Bharat Forge. The company manufactured black and white and colour television sets, and videocassette recorders under the brand name Optonica. It became a public limited company on 20 September 1985. The company was renamed Kalyani Sharp India Ltd. on 2 May 1986. Japan's Sharp Corporation acquired a 40% stake in Kalyani Sharp India Ltd. in 1990. The company was renamed Sharp India Ltd. in 2005.

=== Kalyani Steels ===
Kalyani Steels Limited (KSL) was established in February 1973 to fulfill the group's in-house requirements for forging quality steel. It manufactures special carbon and alloy steels and alloy steel ingots blooms and billets.

=== Hospet Steel Limited ===
The manufacturing facility at Koppal, Hospet, Karnataka (known as Hospet Steels) was established in 1998 as a Joint venture alliance between Mukand and Kalyani Steels. It is an integrated steel plant, spread across 375 acres, with steel-making, finishing and testing facilities. The current capacity of the plant is 2.9 MTPA.It is also known as Kalyani Steels Hospet plant

=== Kalyani Carpenter ===
Kalyani Carpenter Special Steels Ltd. (now Saarloha Advanced Materials Pvt. Ltd.) was established in 1999 as a joint venture between Kalyani Steels and American company Carpenter Technology Corporation. Kalyani Steels' original facility in Pune is now operated by Kalyani Carpenter.

=== Kalyani Forge ===
Ellora Engineering Co. Pvt. Ltd. was founded by Neelkanth A. Kalyani in 1979 and began commercial production of forgings in 1981. The company was renamed Kalyani Forge Limited in 1992. Kalyani Forge was the first forging company in India to have the entire press technology as opposed to hammers, which were more common at that time. It is a leader forging and machining critical parts like connecting rods, stub axles, and driveline components.

=== Kalyani Technoforge ===
Kalyani Technoforge Limited, formerly Kalyani Thermal Systems Limited, was established in 1979. It manufactures forgings, machined components, sub-assemblies, and assemblies.

=== Automotive Axles ===
Automotive Axles Limited (AAL) was established on 21 April 1981 as a joint venture between the Kalyani Group (35.52%) and American company Meritor (35.52%). It manufactures drive axles, non-drive axles, front steer axles, specialty axles, defence axles, and drum and disc brakes. Automotive Axles has manufacturing plants in Mysore, Karnataka, and Jamshedpur, Jharkhand.

=== Kalyani Global ===
Kalyani Global Engineering Private Limited was established in 1985. It is engaged in the urban infrastructure and construction industry.

=== Hikal ===
Hikal Limited is a specialty chemicals company established in 1988. It manufactures active ingredients and intermediates and provides R&D services for pharmaceutical, animal health, biotech, and crop protection companies.

=== Kalyani Maxion Wheels ===
Baba Kalyani established a wheel manufacturing facility in Chakan, Pune, at the request of Ratan Tata, with technology from Hayes Lemmerz. Kalyani Lemmerz Ltd (KLL) was established as joint venture between the Kalyani Group (75%) and Hayes Lemmerz International Inc (25%) in 1996. In 1998, Hayes Lemmerz increased its stake in the company to 85%, with the Kalyani Group holding the remaining 15%. In February 2007, Kalyani Lemmerz announced that it would invest $25 million to expand capacity at its wheel manufacturing facility at Chakan. Hayes Lemmerz International Inc was acquired by Brazilian company Iochpe-Maxion in October 2011. Kalyani Lemmerz Ltd. was renamed Kalyani Maxion Wheels Ltd. following the acquisition.

=== BF Utilities ===
BF Utilities Limited was established on 15 September 2000 as a result of the demerger of the Investment and Windmills division of Bharat Forge Limited. The Investment business was demerged again from BF Utilities Ltd to a new company called BF Investment Ltd. (BFIL) on 14 January 2011.

=== Kalyani Investment ===
On 25 June 2009, Kalyani Investment Company Limited (KICL) was formed through the demerger of the investment business from Kalyani Steels, along with the amalgamation of the "Investment Undertaking" from three subsidiaries of Kalyani Steel: Chakrapani Investments & Trades, Surajmukhi Investment & Finance, and Gladiolla Investments.

=== BF Investment ===
BF Investment Ltd. (BFIL) was established on 14 January 2011 as a result of the demerger of the Investment division from BF Utilities Ltd. BFIL holds stakes in several other Kalyani Group companies.

=== Baramati Speciality Steels ===
Baramati Speciality Steels Limited (BSSL) was founded in 2011. It is located in Satara, Maharashtra.

=== Synise Technologies ===
Synise Technologies Ltd. is a company focused on procurement and Selling Services.

=== KCTI ===
Kalyani Centre for Technology and Innovation (KCTI) is an ISO 17025 NABL certified laboratory established in Pune by the Kalyani Group at an investment of $14 million. The lab is recognized by the Department of Science and Technology, and by Rolls-Royce and Boeing.

== Former companies ==
=== Bharat FC ===
Kalyani Group forayed into Indian football by launching a football club named Kalyani Bharat FC on 23 November 2014. The club began competing in I-league from January 2015 and was given direct entry to I-league by the AIFF as an initiative to bring corporates into football. Bharat FC was the 2nd team to enter I-league under this initiative after JSW Group-led Bengaluru FC, which entered the league in the 2013–14 season. Bharat FC played only one season of the I-League, finishing at the bottom of the table, before closing down.

=== Kalyani Brakes ===
Kalyani Brakes was a joint venture company in which the Kalyani Group and Bosch held a 40% stake each. The company manufactured conventional braking systems and components for passenger cars, tractors, three-wheelers, and two-wheelers. Bosch bought out the Kalyani Group's stake in the joint venture in January 2013. Kalyani Brakes was renamed Bosch Chassis Systems India.

=== Kenersys GmbH ===
The Kalyani Group acquired Münster, Germany-based wind energy and design consulting firm RSB Consult GmbH on 3 September 2007 for an undisclosed amount. The company was renamed Kenersys GmbH, an abbreviation for Kalyani Energy Systems. US-based private equity firm First Reserve Corporation acquired a stake in Kenersys in April 2008. Kalyani Group appointed Paulo Fernando, who was previously the CEO of Suzlon China, as the new CEO of Kenersys in June 2010. In September 2010, Kenersys was awarded a contract by Bharat Forge to build a 8 MW wind turbine in Satara district, Maharashtra. Kenersys established a wind turbine production plant at Baramati, Pune district in September 2011. In August 2016, the Kalyani Group reached an agreement to sell Kenersys to German wind turbine manufacturer Senvion for an estimated ₹250 crore (US$27 million).

=== Alstom Bharat Forge Power ===
Alstom Bharat Forge Power Limited was a joint venture between the French company Alstom and Bharat Forge. Originally, Alstom held a 51% stake and Bharat Forge held the remaining 49%. Alstom's shares were acquired by American conglomerate General Electric on 25 November 2015 as part of its global acquisition of Alstom's energy business. Alstom Bharat Forge won a contract to supply two units of 660 MW supercritical coal turbines to NTPC Limited for a power plant in Solapur, Maharashtra. Alstom Bharat Forge began production of supercritical turbines and generators at a new manufacturing facility at Sanand, Gujarat in May 2016. The company won a contract to supply two units of 800 MW ultra-supercritical steam turbine generator islands for the Telangana Super Thermal Power Project Phase-1 near Ramagundam. On 8 November 2016, the board of Bharat Forge approved the exit of the company from Alstom Bharat Forge Power. In March 2017, Bharat Forge announced that it would divest 23% of its shares to GE, and the remaining 26% stake was divested in February 2018 completing Bharat Forge's exit from Alstom Bharat Forge Power.

== Controversy ==
Baba Kalyani, Chairman of the group, became embroiled in a legal dispute with his sister Sugandha and her husband Jaidev Hiremath concerning control of Hikal Limited, a subsidiary of the Kalyani Group. They submitted a case in the Bombay High Court, alleging that Kalyani's move to increase his group's stake by 5% aimed to gain full control, sidelining and ousting them. The Hiremaths held 35% (valued at Rs 3,578 crore), while Kalyani possessed 34%. Hiremath contended that Kalyani selectively disregarded a significant 1994 note indicating the transfer of Hikal shares to Sugandha's family.

However, Kalyani refuted the 1994 transfer clause in the family arrangement, deeming it a false assertion by Sugandha. He acknowledged the October 1993 agreement mentioning Hikal's transfer to the Hiremaths but asserted it was overridden by the 1994 arrangement. Kalyani also noted that the Taj meeting centered on resolving ownership matters at Bharat Forge and Kalyani Forge, not acknowledging any Hikal agreement in 1994. InGovern, an advisory firm, expressed concerns about the lack of agreement between conflicting promoter groups due to differing shareholdings, hampering the passage of special resolutions. In response, Hikal accused InGovern of bias and spreading misinformation to damage the company's reputation. Hikal reaffirmed the Hiremath family's status as promoters, dismissing InGovern's claims and emphasizing that the ongoing lawsuit is a shareholder-level issue, unlikely to impact the company's performance.

In 2024, a new front opened in the row between Baba Kalyani and his sister Sugandha. Sameer and Pallavi, children of Sugandha and Jai Hiremath, have filed suit in a Pune court seeking partition of the Kalyani family assets to claim their share of the Kalyani Hindu Undivided Family (HUF) assets.

Baba Kalyani, who turned 75, has a net worth of over $4 billion, was removed from his board position at Hikal in January 2024. Kalyani, who still remains the chairman of Bharat Forge, has been sparring with his sister, Sugandha Hiremath, over a family will. The suit states that while Baba Kalyani has derived several benefits from the 1994 Family Arrangement, he is refusing to meet his obligation to transfer the Hikal shares to Hiremaths.
