= Wadi-beldar =

Village in Maharashtra

Wadi-beldar is a small village in Ratnagiri district, Maharashtra state in Western India. The 2011 Census of India recorded a total of 53 residents in the village. Wadi-beldar's geographical area is approximately 981 hectares (2,420 acres).
