= Stuart Watkiss =

English football player and manager (born 1966)

Personal information
- Date of birth: 8 May 1966 (age 60)
- Place of birth: Wolverhampton, England
- Height: 6 ft 1 in (1.85 m)
- Position: Defender

Youth career
- 1982–1984: Willenhall Town

Senior career*
Years	Team	Apps	(Gls)
1984–1985	Wolverhampton Wanderers	2	(0)
1985–1986	Gresley	17	(0)
1986–1992	Crewe Alexandra	3	(0)
1992–1993	Rushall Olympic		
1993–1996	Walsall	62	(2)
1996	Hereford United	19	(0)
1996–1999	Mansfield Town	35	(1)

Managerial career
- Mansfield Town (Youth Team)
- 2002: Mansfield Town
- 2004: Barnsley (Academy Manager)
- 2004–2006: Kidderminster Harriers
- 2006: Grimsby Town (caretaker)
- 2008: Grimsby Town (caretaker)
- 2008–2013: Hull City (Development / Reserve Coach)
- 2013–2014: Grimsby Town (Youth Team)
- 2014–2016: Bharat
- 2016: Grimsby Town (caretaker)
- 2017: Naxxar Lions
- 2018–2022: Bangladesh (assistant)
- 2022–2023: Jamshedpur (assistant)
- 2024: Eastbourne Borough (assistant)
- 2025–2026: Kidderminster Harriers (assistant)
Medal record
Men's football
Representing Bangladesh As Assistant Manager
South Asian Games
Bronze medal – third place	2019 Kathmandu
- * Club domestic league appearances and goals

Stuart Watkiss (born 8 May 1966) is an English football coach and former professional player.

As a player, he was a defender and notably played in the Football League with Wolverhampton Wanderers, Crewe Alexandra, Walsall, Hereford United and Mansfield Town. He became manager of Mansfield in 2002, and later took charge Kidderminster Harriers. Since 2006, he has held strong affiliations to Grimsby Town where he has had three separate spells serving as assistant manager and youth team manager as well as acting as caretaker manager. He has also briefly managed abroad at both Bharat FC and Naxxar Lions and has held various other roles on the coaching staff's of Barnsley, Hull City and Stockport County.

== Playing career ==
Watkiss started his playing career at Ward's Bridge School in his hometown of Wolverhampton. He then joined Willenhall Town, for the youth team, which reached the Midland Floodlit Youth League Cup final at Villa Park during the 1982–83 season. He later joined his home town club Wolverhampton Wanderers, where he served his apprenticeship as a 17-year-old. His debut was on 17 March 1984 in a Division One game with Sunderland; however, after making only two appearances, he joined West Midlands (Regional) League side Gresley Rovers in June 1985, before making a move to Crewe Alexandra in January 1986.

He went on to play for Rushall Olympic, Walsall, and Hereford United before moving to Mansfield Town in 1996, scoring his only goal for the Stags in a 2–4 win at Darlington in October when he met a Ben Sedgemore cross with a header which bounced downward and up into the top corner of the net. Watkiss remained with Town until hanging his boots up in 1999.

== Management and coaching career ==
=== Mansfield Town ===
Watkiss remained at Mansfield Town as youth team coach taking over from Tony Ford, producing at least ten players who progressed into the first team during his three years in charge of the club's youth set-up. In June 2001, assistant manager Mark Kearney left to join Northampton Town as youth team coach. Speculation mounted that Watkiss would step up to assistant manager. Watkiss told the press "I do feel that the job would be a natural progression for me. A lot of the lads who have come up through the club were with me and I would like the chance to work with them again." A few of weeks later, the club's official website revealed that "the worst kept secret in the club's history had been confirmed", and Watkiss was promoted to assistant manager. Manager Billy Dearden explained, "I gave the position a lot of thought and have decided that Stuart is the best man for the job. He is a young coach who could go a long way in the game. He is at the right age to work with me, and it is a huge reward for him. He has done an excellent job with the youth team and it was a huge wrench to take him away from the youth team." Watkiss said "I am confident in my ability, I wouldn't have gone for the job if not. Obviously time will tell if I am a success or not, but I am cautiously optimistic. It will be great working with Bill Dearden. He has a wealth of knowledge and experience within the game and I will be watching and learning all the time."

Following the resignation of Billy Dearden to take over at Notts County, Watkiss made the step up from assistant manager at Mansfield Town to become the team's manager in January 2002, where he guided them to their first promotion in 10 years. Due to his promotion success, he was then rewarded a three-year contract, butMansfield struggled in the 2002–03 season and by December 2002, following a 4–2 defeat away to Port Vale, the Stags were bottom of Division Two, Watkiss and assistant Neil Richardson were sacked after a meeting with Mansfield chairman Keith Haslam on the following Monday.

=== Kidderminster Harriers ===
Watkiss became academy manager at Barnsley in September 2004, before his next port of call to manage Kidderminster Harriers an 18-month contract between 2004 and 2006.

=== Grimsby Town ===
Following his dismissal he became Assistant Manager to Graham Rodger at Grimsby Town, and took over team affairs briefly in November 2006 following the sacking of Rodger, but he was overlooked for the job, which was given to Alan Buckley instead.

Watkiss continued in his role as Assistant Manager for the 2006–07 and 2007–08 campaigns, signing a new one-year contract in June 2007, he said "I'm absolutely delighted to be staying and I can't wait for the season to begin, I've learned so much from Alan in such a short time and I have really enjoyed working with him." He was once again given the role of Caretaker Manager

Grimsby appointed Mike Newell in October 2008 and Watkiss re-took his former position as Assistant Manager. At the end of the 2008–09 season, Watkiss was relieved of his duties at the club, and replaced by the club's Chief Scout, Brian Stein.

=== Hull City ===
He was appointed as Development Coach by Phil Brown at Hull City in July 2009. Subsequent to the appointment of Steve Bruce as team manager, on 8 June 2012, Watkiss and fellow first team coach Steve Wigley left the club.

=== Stockport County ===
On 28 January 2013 Watkiss was appointed assistant manager of Stockport County on an initial three-month deal, working under Darije Kalezić.

=== Return to Grimsby Town ===
On 11 September 2013 Watkiss rejoined Grimsby Town as the club's new youth team manager following the resignation of Adam Smith.

=== Bharat FC ===
On 4 November 2014 it was announced that Watkiss would become the first ever head coach of the Bharat FC for the 2014–15 season.

=== Third spell with Grimsby ===
On 26 October 2016 Watkiss returned to Grimsby on a temporary basis as joint caretaker manager with Dave Moore. Watkiss and Moore oversaw the club's 0–0 draw with Yeovil Town and 1-0 FA Cup defeat to Bolton Wanderers. In January 2017 Watkiss signed for the club on a permanent basis as a Development Coach.

=== Naxxar Lions ===
In September 2017 Watkiss was appointed manager of Maltese Premier League side Naxxar Lions in Malta. He resigned for personal reasons from the position in November 2017.

=== Bangladesh ===
In 2018, Watkiss was appointed assistant coach of the Bangladesh national football team under Jamie Day.

=== Jamshedpur ===
In July 2022, Watkiss moved to Indian Super League club Jamshedpur as an assistant to head coach Aidy Boothroyd.

=== Eastbourne Borough ===
In January 2024, Watkiss returned to coach in England, being appointed assistant manager to Adam Murray at National League South club Eastbourne Borough. Watkiss left Eastbourne in November 2024, in order to spend more time with his family.

=== Return to Kidderminster Harriers ===
In October 2025, Watkiss returned to Kidderminster Harriers, once again appointed as assistant manager to Adam Murray. Having achieved promotion, Watkiss departed the club following the departure of Murray.

== Managerial statistics ==
As of match played 17 November 2017

Managerial record by team and tenure
Team	From	To	Record					Ref
Team	From	To	P	W	D	L	Win %	Ref
Mansfield Town	9 January 2002	2 December 2002	45	16	5	24	35.6	
Kidderminster Harriers	30 November 2004	1 January 2006	55	17	11	27	30.9	
Grimsby Town	5 March 2018	6 October 2008	3	0	1	2	0.0	
Bharat	4 November 2014	30 May 2015	20	4	6	10	20.0	
Naxxar Lions	3 September 2017	17 November 2017	8	1	3	4	12.5	
Total			131	38	26	67	29.0	—

== Honours ==
=== Club ===
Walsall

- Division Three second-place promotion: 1994–95

=== Manager ===
Mansfield Town

- Division Three third-place promotion: 2001–02
