= Iochpe-Maxion =

Automobile components manufacturer

Iochpe-Maxion S.A.
- Type: Sociedade Anônima
- Traded as: B3: MYPK3
- Industry: Wheel; Rail
- Founded: 1918 in Rio Grande do Sul, Brazil
- Founders: Gregorio Iochpe, Miguel Ioschpe, Moyses Ioschpe, Salomao Ioschpe and Israel Iochpe
- Headquarters: São Paulo, Brazil
- Website: www.iochpe.com.br

Iochpe-Maxion S.A. is an automobile components manufacturer based in São Paulo, Brazil.

== Overview ==

The company has 25 industrial units, three offices and nearly 19 thousand employees located in 14 countries.

The Iochpe Maxion Group operates two divisions in the automotive sector: Maxion Wheels and Maxion Structural Components. Maxion Wheels manufactures and trades a wide range of steel wheels for light and commercial vehicles and farm machinery, and aluminum wheels for light vehicles. Maxion Structural Components produces mainly sidemembers, crossmembers and complete chassis for commercial vehicles and structural stamped items for light vehicles.

AmstedMaxion produces freight cars, wheels and railway and industrial castings for the railway sector. It operates through a joint venture.

== History ==
Iochpe-Maxion was founded in 1918 in the state of Rio Grande do Sul.

In August 2009, the company purchased the wheels business of ArvinMeritor in Brazil, Mexico and the United States, which was then named "Fumagalli Division".

In December 2010, aiming at increasing its production capacity in Mexico, the company purchased the wheels business of Nugar S.A.P.I. de C.V., a Mexican company controlled by the CIE Automotive group.

== Subsidiaries ==
=== Maxion Wheels ===
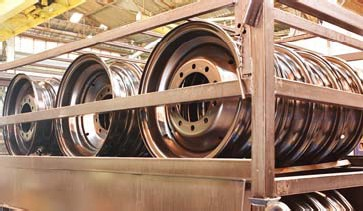

Maxion Wheels has 20 facilities located in 14 countries around the world. The Company sells wheels to manufacturers of passenger cars and commercial highway vehicles.

(rif: company site )

=== Maxion Structural Components ===
Maxion Structural Components manufactures and sells structural components for trucks, buses, pick-ups, cars, tractors, agricultural machinery and off-road vehicles. Maxion Structural Components has nearly 5,000 employees and manufacturing 08 plants distributed in Brazil, Argentina, Uruguay and Mexico.

=== Amsted Maxion ===
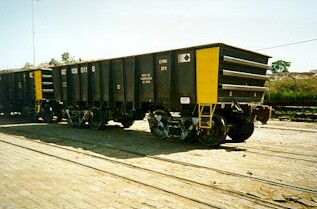
Amsted-Maxion railroad gondola

A pioneer, AmstedMaxion serves all railways and their users in Brazil and abroad, including freight car leasing companies. In the largest steel casting plant of South America, parts of up to 6 tons are manufactured for application on machinery and industries of civil construction, mining, siderurgy, automobile and railway.
