= Rasalgad =

Fort in the Maharashtra state of India

Rasalgad Fort
- Ratnagiri District, Maharashtra
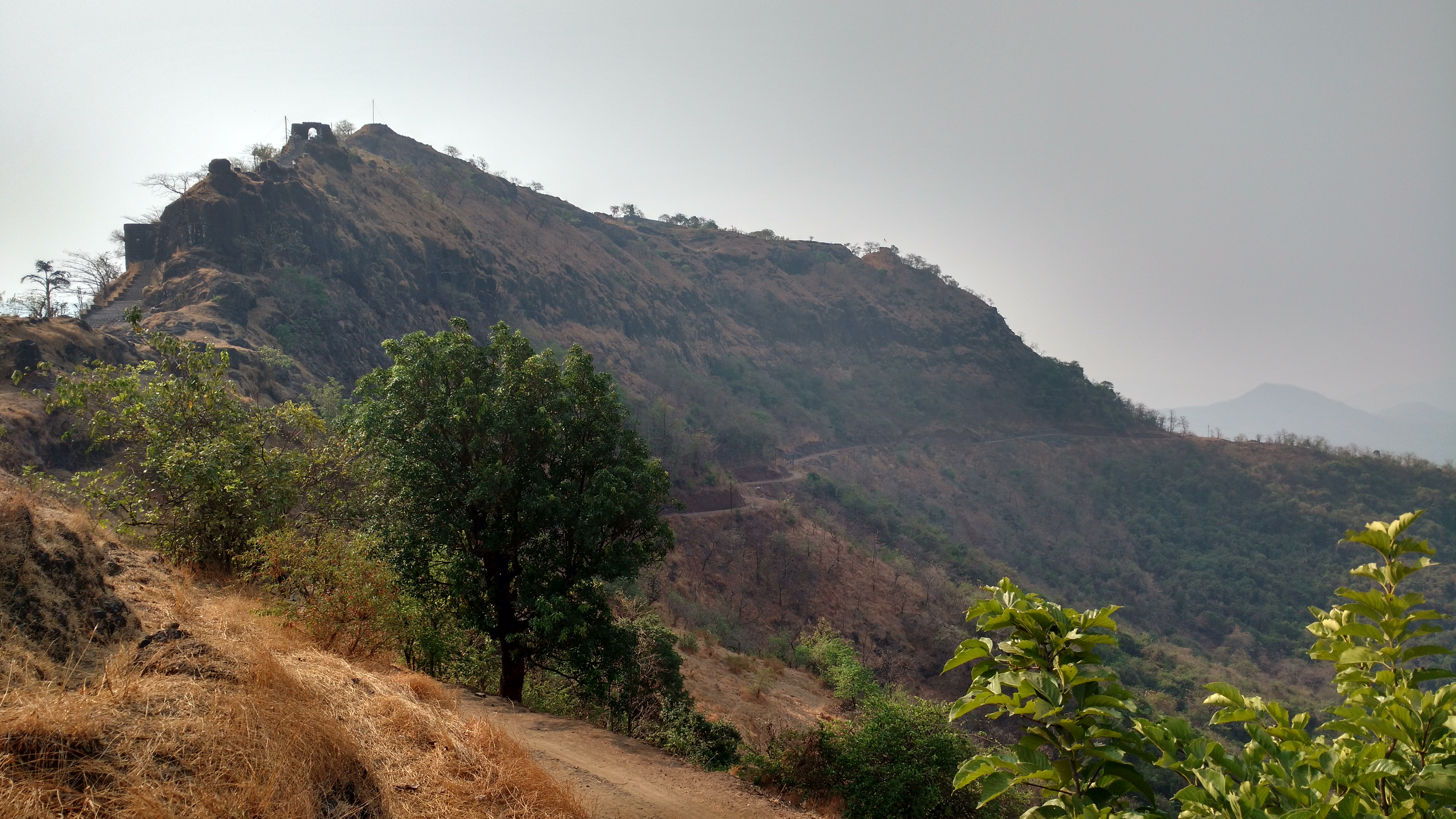
- Rasalgad Fort

Site information
- Type: Hill fort
- Owner: Government of India
- Open to the public: Yes
- Condition: Good

Location
- Shown within Maharashtra
- Coordinates: 17°45′53″N 73°30′43″E
- Height: 1,770 feet (500 m) ASL

Site history
- Materials: Stone, Lead

Rasalgad is a fort in the Maharashtra state of India. It lies 15 km east of Khed City. The fort has been developed as a tourist attraction. Its fortification is in good condition. The fort lied on the south end of a narrow spur which joins with Suamargad and Mahipatgad in the north direction. In 2003 the fort was declared a protected monument by the department of archaeology, Maharashtra.

== History ==
Very little history is known about this fort. This fort was in the captivity of the Morè (clan) of Javli from whom Shivaji Maharaj captured this fort. In 1818 British forces captured it from the Peshwas

== Places to see ==
The fort has a rush of visitors on weekends. It is on a small triangular plateau of five acres, fortified on all sides. The two entrance gates are in good condition. There is a Veer Maruti idol near the first gate. There is a Zolayidevi temple on the fort with a stone Deepmala and Tulsi Vrindavan in the front. There are two large rock cut water cisterns on the fort. There are 16 cannons on the fort. There is a storeroom in good condition. Chakdev and Parvatgad are seen from the Fort. Earlier, based on the above information, it was recorded that there were only 16 guns on the fort. The 17th cannon was half broken in front of the granary. Then on 23 January 2022, the Sahyadri Pratishthan took out the 18th cannon which was lying in the valley 400 feet east of the fort and placed it in front of the Zolai Devi temple on the fort. Then on 6 March 2022, the 19th cannon was found in a 150-foot valley below the Peer Buruja on the west side of the fort. This performance was done by Sahyadri Pratishthan Khed Vibhaga. cannon no.18 and 19 Information was provided to the state Archaeological Department.

== How to reach ==
The village Rasalwadi is located on the foothill. It is well connected by road. It takes about 10 minutes to reach the fort from Rasalwadi. The temple on the fort is a favourite amongst the trekkers for night halt. The journey to the Suamargad-Mahipatgad trek begins from Rasalgad.

== Gallery ==
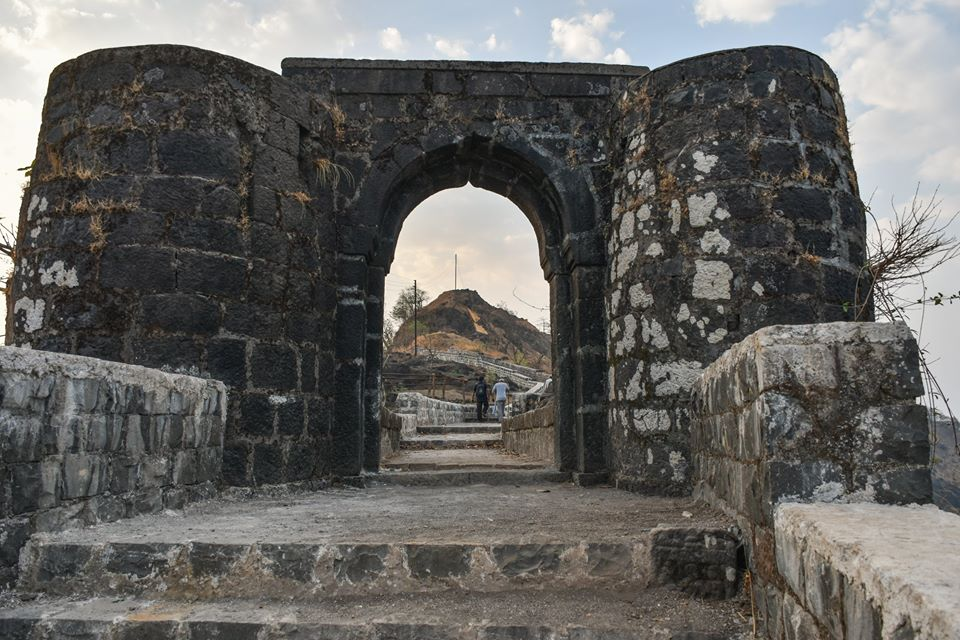
The main gate

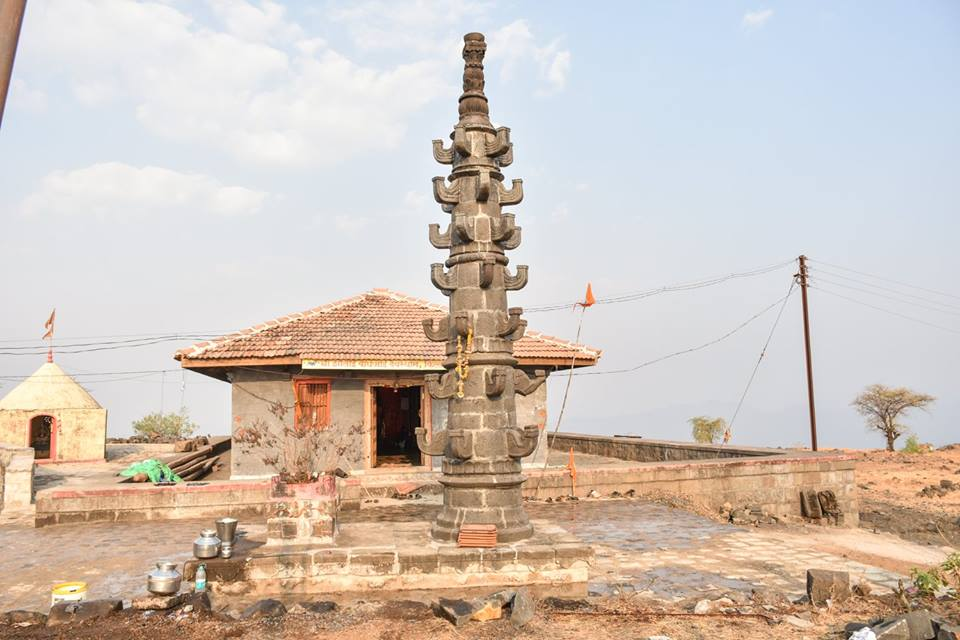
Zolayidevi temple with deepmal in front

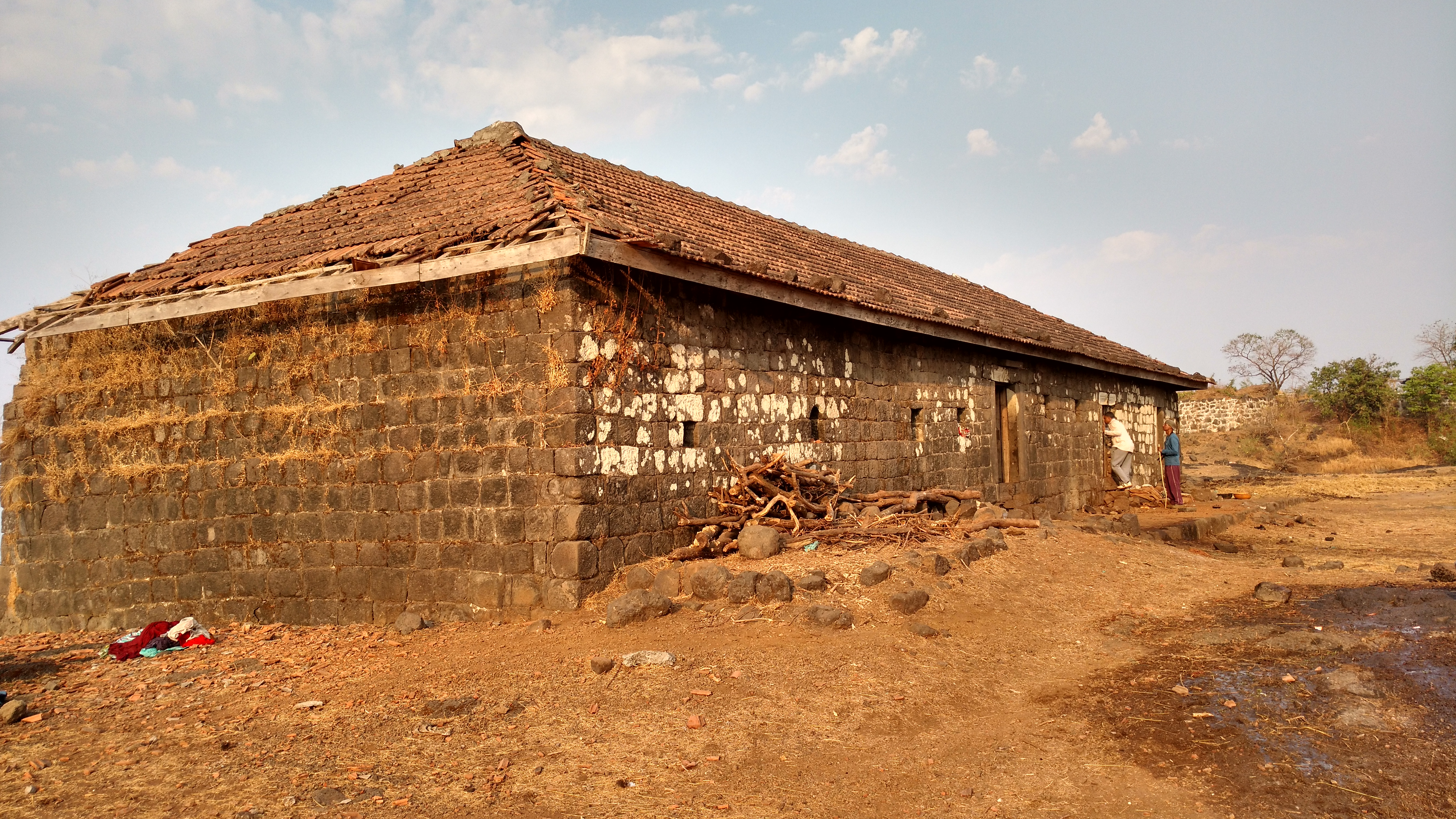
The store room

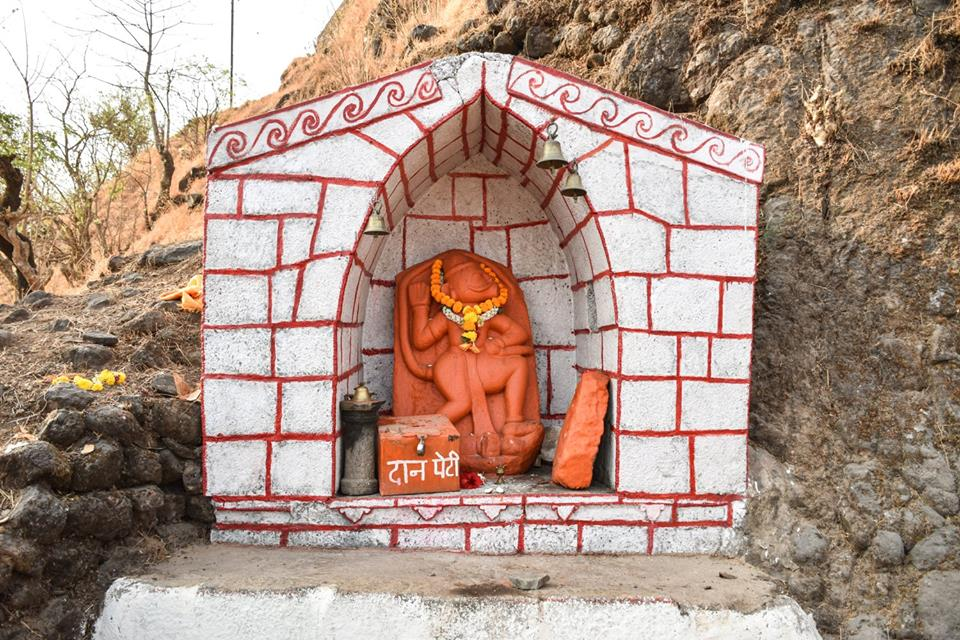
The veer maruti idol

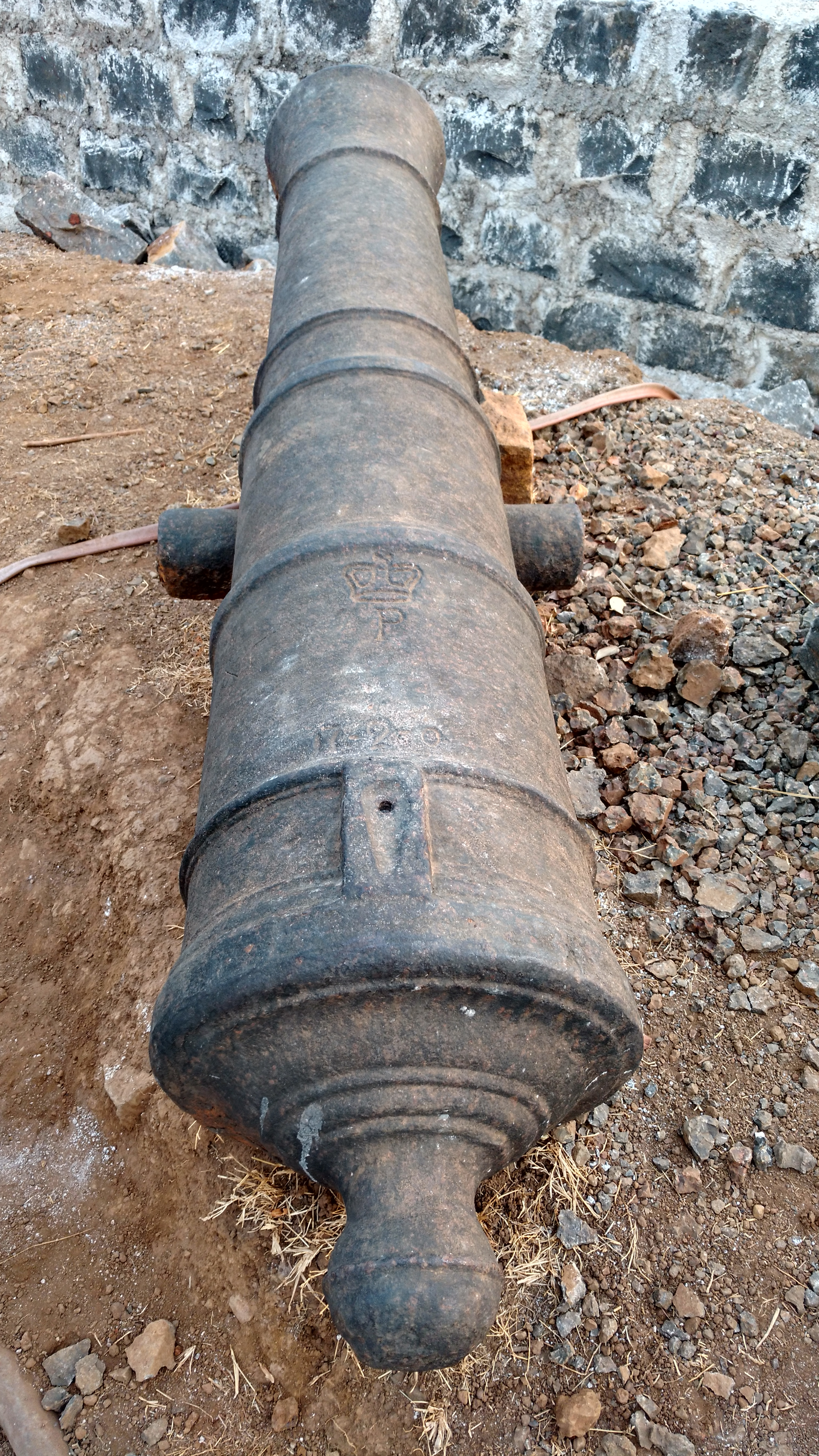
Cannon on the fort

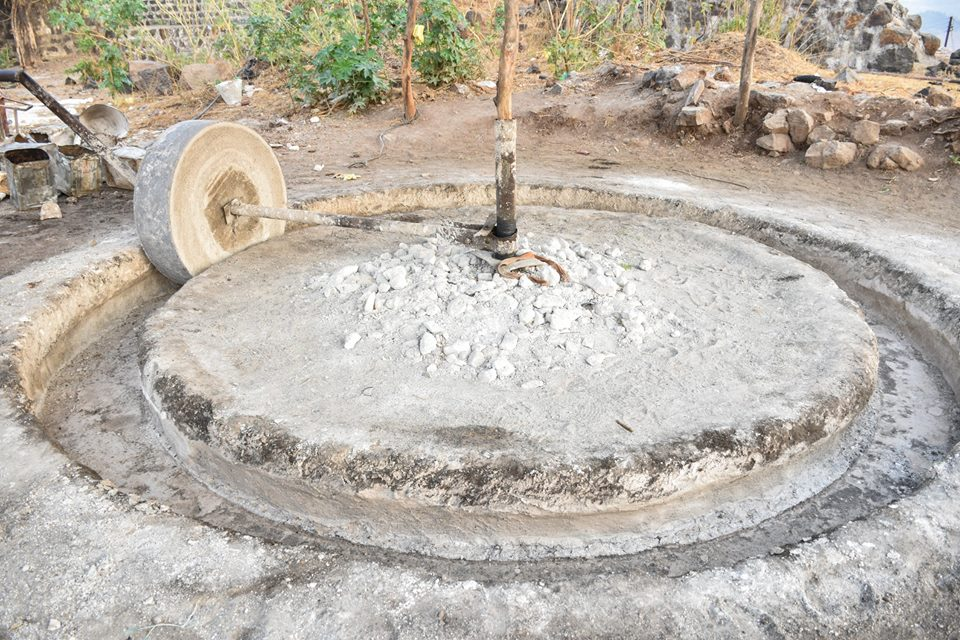
Lime mortar mixer

== See also ==
- List of forts in Maharashtra
- List of forts in India
- Ratnagiri
- Marathi People
- List of Maratha dynasties and states
- Maratha War of Independence
- Battles involving the Maratha Empire
- Maratha titles
- Military history of India
