= TLPA =

TLPA is an acronym. It may indicate:

- Taiwanese Language Phonetic Alphabet
- The Taxicab, Limousine & Paratransit Association, a non-profit trade association of and for the private passenger transportation industry
