= Adani Enterprises =

Indian multinational holding company pvt ptd

Adani Enterprises Limited
- Formerly: Adani Exports Limited (1993–2006)
- Type: Public
- Traded as: BSE: 512599; NSE: ADANIENT; NSE NIFTY 50 constituent
- ISIN: INE423A01024
- Founded: 2 March 1993; 33 years ago
- Founder: Gautam Adani
- Headquarters: Ahmedabad, Gujarat, India
- Area served: Worldwide
- Key people: Gautam Adani (chairman); Rajesh Adani (MD)
- Services: Mining; Airport operations; Food processing; Road infrastructure; Solar PV system manufacturing; Data centers; Water infrastructure; Aerospace; Defence; Rail infrastructure; Bunkering; Hydrocarbon exploration
- Revenue: ▲₹102,943 crore (US$11 billion) (2026)
- Operating income: ▼₹16,464 crore (US$1.7 billion) (2026)
- Net income: ▲₹9,339 crore (US$970 million) (2026)
- Total assets: ▲₹189,224 crore (US$20 billion) (2026)
- Total equity: ▲₹62,779 crore (US$6.5 billion) (2026)
- Number of employees: 8,846 (2026)
- Parent: Adani Group
- Subsidiaries: See list
- Website: www.adanienterprises.com

Adani Enterprises Limited (AEL) is an Indian multinational publicly listed holding company and a part of Adani Group. It is headquartered in Ahmedabad and primarily involved in mining and trading of coal and iron ore. Through its various subsidiaries, it also has business interests in airport operations, edible oils, road, rail and water infrastructure, data centers, and solar manufacturing, among others.

== History ==
The company was incorporated in 1993 under the name Adani Exports Limited. It mainly deals with the group's integrated resources management, power trading, and natural resources businesses on a standalone basis. Its general purpose is to act as an in-house incubator for Adani Group's new businesses until they become self-sustainable.

== Subsidiaries ==
Adani Enterprises is involved in edible oils foods, airport operations, solar PV manufacturing, road, water infrastructure, data centers, agri-output storage and distribution, defence and aerospace, bunkering, shipping, rail and metro infrastructure, oil exploration, petrochemicals, mass media, green hydrogen, copper, aluminium, and online services.

Subsidiaries of Adani Enterprises include:

=== Adani Defence & Aerospace ===
It is a defense manufacturing arm of the company. It manufactures with armed drones such as Drishti 10 Starliner UAV as well as small arms including IWI Negev, Tavor TAR-21, and IWI ACE at the PLR Systems facility in Gwalior. As a part of a joint venture between Elbit Systems from Israel and Adani Defence and Aerospace, a manufacturing facility for unmanned aerial vehicle have been set up at Hyderabad, Telangana, inaugurated in 2019.

In April 2020, Adani Defence Systems and Technologies acquired Alpha Design Technologies Pvt Ltd., an organization involved in the design, development, and manufacture of defense electronics and avionics. In May 2022, Adani Defence Systems and Technologies, a wholly owned subsidiary of Adani Enterprises, signed a definitive agreement to acquire a 50% stake in Bengaluru-based General Aeronautics. The company is involved with DRDO in Long Range Glide Bomb, VSHORAD, ULPGM, NASM-SR and Rudram-1.

In February 2024, Adani Defence & Aerospace inaugurated two ammunition and missile manufacturing facilities in the Uttar Pradesh Defence Corridor at Kanpur. Uttar Pradesh Chief Minister, Yogi Adityanath, inaugurated the Ammunition & Missiles Complex, marking the first phase of the state's defence corridor. These facilities are designed to produce various calibres of ammunition and missiles for the Indian armed forces and police. The complex spans 500 acres and will produce 150 million rounds of small-calibre ammunition, covering 25% of India's annual requirement.

Adani Defence supplies the Igla-S missile to the Indian Army. The firm received transfer of technology from Rosoboronexport. A contract, worth ₹260 crore (US$27 million), for the purchase of 120 launchers and 400 missiles was concluded in November 2023. The first batch of 24 launchers and 100 missiles was delivered in April 2024 directly from Russia, whereas the latter batches are being assembles in India the deliveries of which commenced in April 2025.

In June 2024, Adani Defence and Aerospace and EDGE Group, a UAE-based technology and defence organisation, entered a cooperation agreement. The collaboration covers missiles, weapons, unmanned systems, air defence products, and electronic warfare technologies with potential R&D and production facilities in India and the UAE.

In May 2025, Adani Defence & Aerospace has signed a binding collaboration agreement with Sparton (DeLeon Springs LLC), a group company of Elbit Systems, to manufacture anti-submarine sonobuoys in India.

Embraer and Adani Group of India signed a memorandum of understanding (MoU) in December 2025 on setting up a final assembly line in India for commercial aircraft having a seating capacity of 70–146 passengers. Adani Defence & Aerospace signed an agreement with Embraer on 27 January at the Wings India to develop an integrated regional transport aircraft ecosystem in India. Firstly, an assembly line will be established followed by a phased increase in indigenisation to support India’s Regional Transport Aircraft (RTA) program under the UDAN programme. Later, on 21 February 2026, during the visit of Brazilian president, Lula da Silva, to India, Embraer signed an enhanced MoU with Adani Defence & Aerospace to establish a production ecosystem for E-175 in India. Under the agreement, a final assembly line (FAL) for the aircraft will be set up in India. This was an advancement from the initial MoU signed in January.

Adani Defence & Aerospace signed another memorandum of understanding with Leonardo for the strategic partnership to establish India's helicopter manufacturing ecosystem. The companies will setup an assembly line for AW169M and AW109 TrekkerM helicopters with phased indigenisation as well as MRO facilities. This is meant to fulfill the requirement of over 1000 helicopters by the Indian Armed Forces. While the AW169M will cater the Indian Navy and Coast Guard's Naval Utility Helicopter (NUH) tender for 76 helicopters against HAL Utility Helicopter-Marine, the TrekkerM will target the reconnaissance and surveillance helicopters (RSH) tender for 200 helicopters of the Indian Army and Air Force against HAL Light Utility Helicopter, Bell 407, and Airbus H125. A joint reply for the tender has been sent to the Indian Defense Ministry. The ecosystem will also serve the domestic civilian market demand.

On 5 September 2026, Adani Defence signed an five-year agreement with the Indian Army to supply 7.62×39mm ammunition for the AK-203 rifle programme, besides components for the rifle. Further, on 12 September, it was reported that within the last two years Adani Defence received six contracts to supply Igla-S missiles under two tranches of Indian military’s emergency procurement clause which has an upper limit of ₹300 crore (US$31 million) for each contract. A purchase contract worth ₹1,800 crore (US$190 million) for 9K333 Verba missile systems is also reportedly in the final stages. The Indian firm was nominated in August 2026 in a singe-vendor situation and was given an exemption from the authorities from a competitive bidding. The Adani Group is negotiating for partnership on more advanced air defence missile systems including the Pantsir.

==== Adani-Elbit Advanced Systems ====
Adani Enterprise and Elbit Systems formed the joint venture business in 2016. It will produce military drones like Hermes 900. Located in Hyderabad, it is the sole Hermes 900 production facility outside of Israel. The first private UAV manufacturing plant in India, the Adani Elbit Unmanned Aerial Vehicles Complex, began operations in December 2018. The factory started off producing full carbon composite aerostructures for Hermes 900 and Hermes 450 for international markets. It increased production to include the construction and integration of entire UAVs. The business began exporting the Hermes 900 by 2020 and set up a Design and Development Center to collaborate on the development of defense technologies.

The company was one of the 14 recipients of the production-linked incentive program for drone and drone component manufacturing in 2022.

==== PLR Systems ====
On 10 September 2020, Adani Land Defence Systems and Technologies, a step-down arm of the Adani Enterprises acquired 51 per cent stake in PLR Systems Private Limited from Fouraces Systems. The other stakeholder is the Israel Weapon Industries (IWI). The firm was incorporated on 5 February 2013 by Punj Lloyd as Punj Lloyd Raksha Systems and engages in manufacturing and supply of indigenously built defense equipment to the armed forces. After forming a joint venture with IWI, a small arms manufacturing facility was inaugurated in Malanpur, Madhya Pradesh on 4 May 2017. The portfolio of the JV would include X95 carbine and assault rifle, Galil sniper rifle, Tavor assault rifle and Negev Light Machine Gun.

The firm received a contract to supply around 41,000 Negev NG-7 light machine guns to the Indian Army in August 2024. The project was approved by the Ministry of Defence (MoD) on 24 August 2023 to acquire 7.62x51 mm LMGs. The guns are being produced by PLR Systems in India as Prahar. An initial batch of 2,000 guns were supplied from the Small Arms Complex on 28 March 2026, eleven months ahead of schedule. Another batch of 4,000 will be supplied in 2026. The original timeline of delivery was nine years from 2024 but the order is expected to be executed by 2029. The gun has an indigenous content of 50% which will be ultimately increased to 100%. The Prahar, a modified version to meet the requirements of the Indian Army, will replace the in-service INSAS LMG which is the standard automatic weapon.

PLR Systems also emerged as the second lowest bidder (L2) for the Indian Armed Forces carbine programme in June 2025. The firm had offered its Adani Jeet, a derivative of IWI Galil ACE-N 21 design, and would be supplied from its Gwalior facility. The contract, worth ₹1,100 crore (equivalent to ₹11 billion or US$120 million in 2026), for 170,085 Adani Jeet carbines was signed on 30 December 2025. Meanwhile, the Kalyani Strategic Systems Limited (KSSL) was the lowest bidder (L1) and would supply 255,128 DRDO Close Quarter Battle carbines.

=== Adani Airport Holdings ===
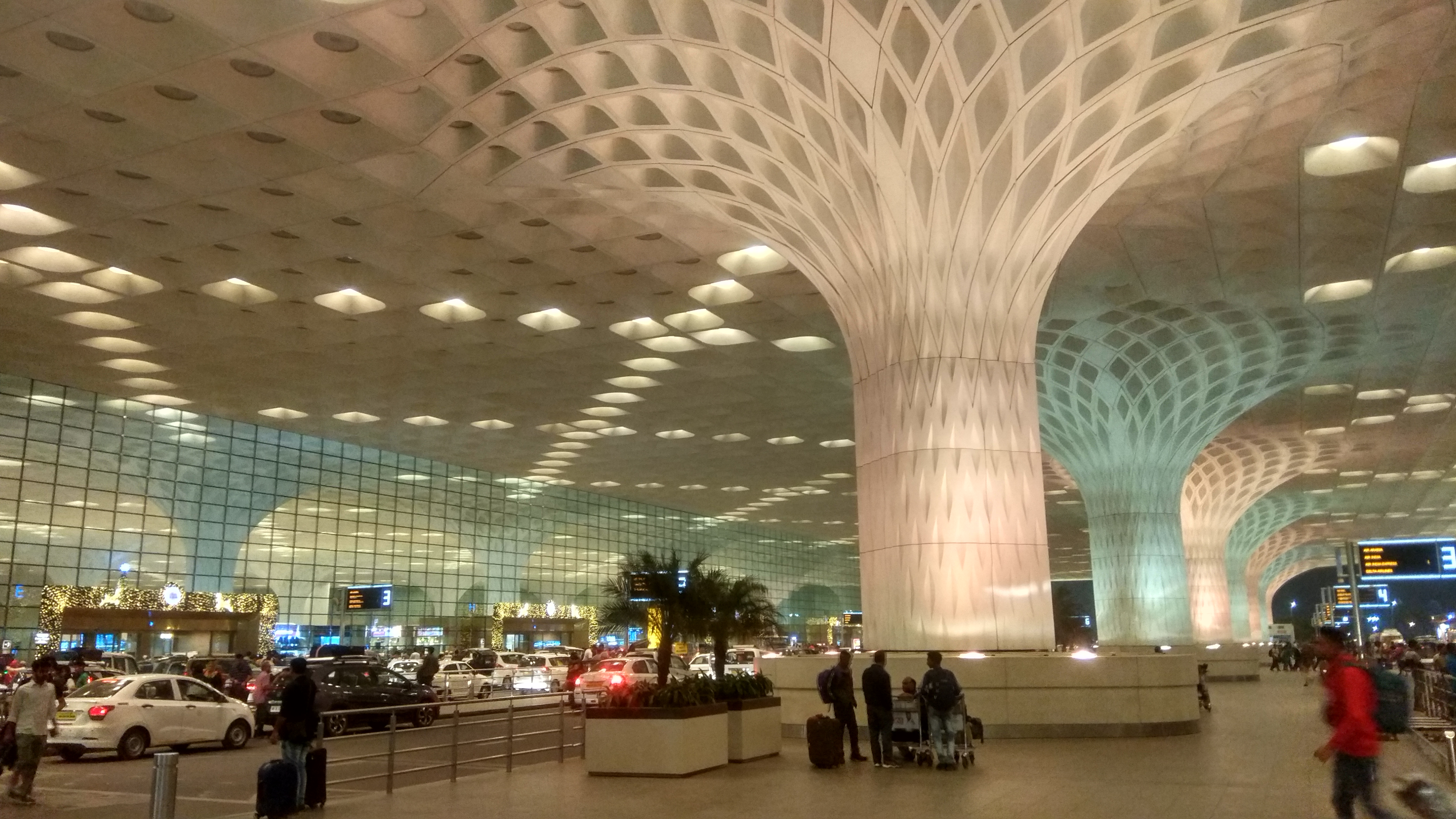
Chhatrapati Shivaji Maharaj International Airport in Mumbai.

Adani Airport Holdings is the airport management and operations subsidiary. It is the majority stakeholder in Mumbai International Airport Limited (MIAL), which owns the Chhatrapati Shivaji Maharaj International Airport and the under-construction Navi Mumbai International Airport.According to media reports as of 2023, Adani Enterprises operates seven airports, acquired during the government's initial privatization initiative. These include Mumbai, Ahmedabad, Lucknow, Thiruvananthapuram, Jaipur, Guwahati, and Mangaluru.

=== Adani Mining ===
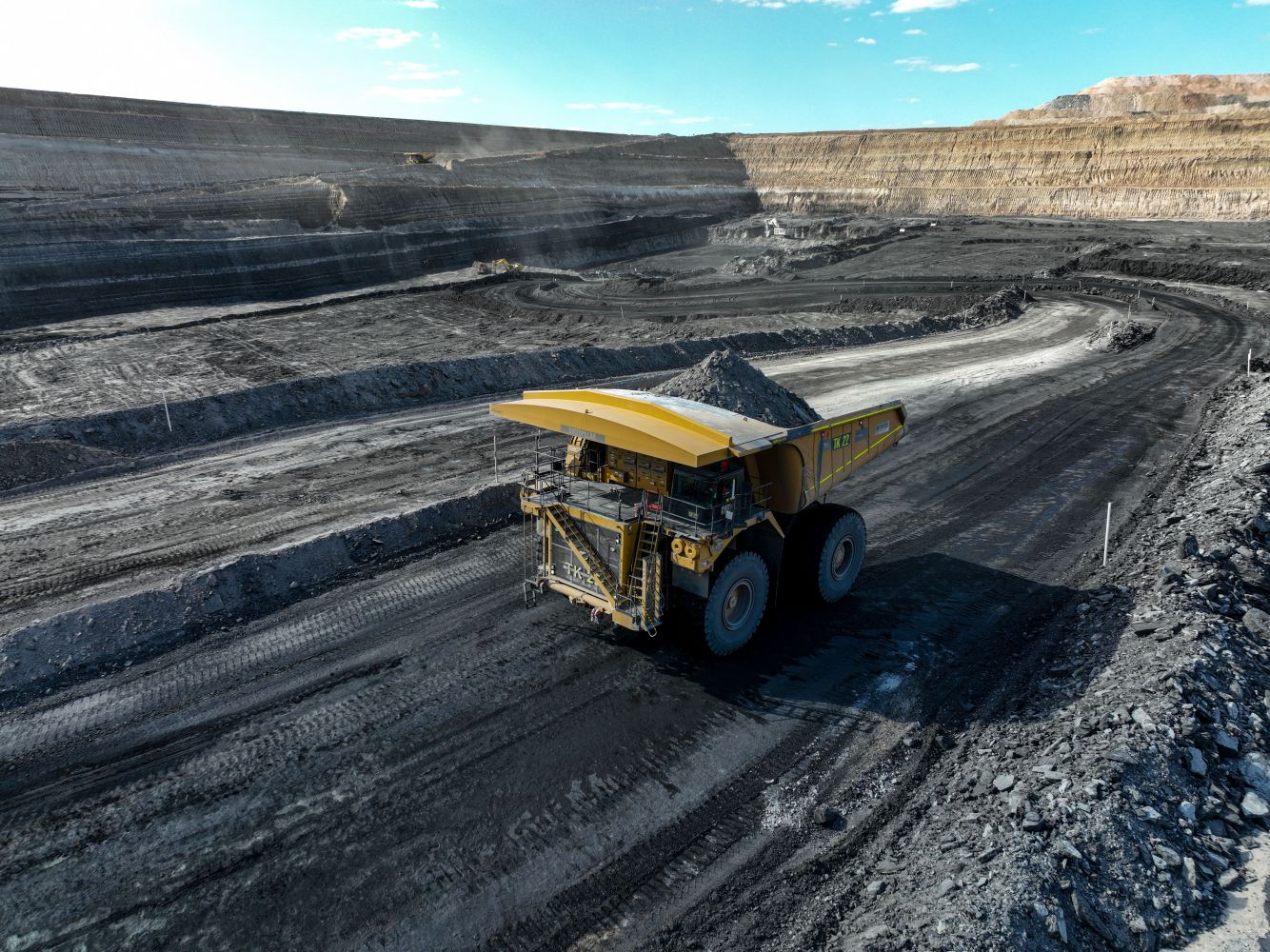
Carmichael coal mine in Australia.

Adani Enterprises operates its mines in India, Indonesia and Australia, and supplies coal to Bangladesh, China, and some countries in Southeast Asia. It has a coal mine in Bunyu, North Kalimantan, Indonesia, which produced 3.9 Mt of coal in 2016–17. The Group has made the largest investment by an Indian company in Australia at the controversial Carmichael coal mine in the Galilee Basin, Queensland. Development of this mine is as of 2020 the subject of a court challenge to the Australian Government over its lack of adherence to environmental legislation.

In 2020, Adani Australia, the controversial Australian mining arm of Adani Enterprises was rebranded as Bravus Mining & Resources. The new subsidiary is responsible for developing Carmichael coal mine in Central Queensland.

=== Adani Road Transport ===
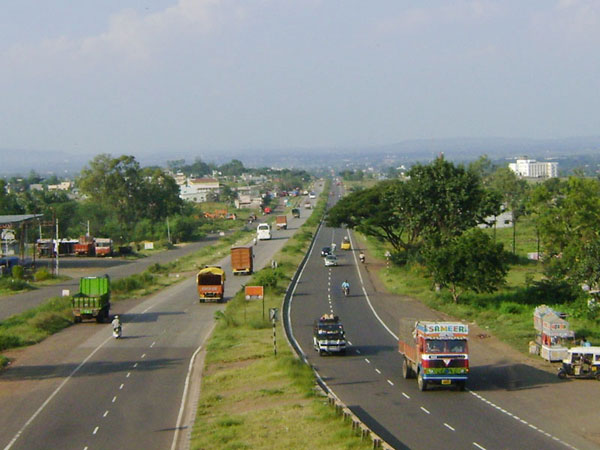
The Kagal–Satara stretch of NH48 to be six-laned under Bharatmala's build-operate-transfer agreement.

Adani Road Transport undertakes construction, operations and maintenance of roads, highways, expressways and tollways. The company has NHAI projects in the states of Andhra Pradesh, Chhattisgarh, Gujarat, Kerala, Madhya Pradesh, Maharashtra, Odisha, Telangana, and West Bengal. Adani road Transport bids the highest for the 124-km stretch of National Highway 38 with Rupees 1692 crores.

In December 2021, it won the contract to build a 464 km stretch of the 594 km-long Ganga Expressway in Uttar Pradesh.

=== Adani Shipping ===
Incorporated in 2006, Adani Shipping is a Singapore-based step-down subsidiary which operates a fleet of bulk carriers. In 2011, it began transporting coal from the group's mines in Indonesia and Australia.

=== Adani Rail and Metro Transport ===
Established in October 2019 as a full-owned subsidiary of AEL, Adani Metro Transport Limited undertakes metro rail projects. Adani group also have their private railway Network.

=== Adani Solar ===
Adani Solar is the solar PV manufacturing and EPC subsidiary of Adani Enterprises. As of November 2020, it is the largest integrated solar cell and module manufacturer in India.

=== Adani New Industries ===
Adani New Industries was incorporated in January 2022 as a wholly owned new energy subsidiary of Adani Enterprises. It undertakes green hydrogen projects such as low-carbon power generation, as well as the manufacture of hydrogen fuel cells, wind turbines, solar modules and batteries.

=== Adani Water ===
It was founded as a subsidiary in December 2018, with a focus on water infrastructure construction. It is currently involved in wastewater treatment, recycle and reuse projects at Prayagraj under the National Mission for Clean Ganga Framework.

=== Adani Welspun Exploration ===
Adani Welspun Exploration is a 65:35 joint venture between Adani Group (through Adani Enterprises) and Welspun Enterprises. It is involved in oil and gas exploration.

=== Kutch Copper ===
Kutch Copper is a wholly owned subsidiary of Adani Enterprises which was incorporated in March 2021 to manufacture copper cathodes, copper rods and other copper products. In 2022, the company was reported to be setting up a greenfield copper refinery complex at Mundra with 1 million tonnes per annum (MTPA) capacity, expected to commence production in 2024.

=== Adani Agri Fresh ===
Adani Agri Fresh is involved in procurement, packaging, logistics and marketing of apples produced by farmers in Himachal Pradesh, as well as and other Indian fruits, under Farm-Pik brand. It also imports fruits from other countries and sells them in the Indian market.

=== Adani Wilmar ===
Incorporated in 1999, Adani Wilmar is a food processing company and a joint venture between Adani Enterprises and Wilmar International. In November 2000, Adani Wilmar launched its flagship brand "Fortune" under which it produces and sells edible oils including sunflower oil, palm oil, soybean oil, mustard oil, rice bran oil, cottonseed oil, groundnut oil and vanaspati. Apart from edible oils, it sells flour, rice, pulses, sugar, soya nuggets and instant food mixes. The company makes personal care products like soaps, handwash and hand sanitizers under "Alife" brand. It makes industrial use products comprising oleochemicals, castor oil and lecithin.

The company went public in January 2022 with an initial public offering, after which Adani Enterprises and Wilmar International continued to hold a combined 88% stake in Adani Wilmar.

On 30 December 2024, Adani Enterprises announced plans to sell its entire 44% stake in Adani Wilmar in a $2 billion deal. The transaction includes Wilmar International acquiring a 31% stake, with the remaining 13% to be sold in the open market to meet regulatory norms.

=== AdaniConneX ===
AdaniConneX was launched in 2021 as a 50:50 joint venture with EdgeConneX to develop a network of hyperscale data centers in India, starting with Chennai, Navi Mumbai, Noida, Visakhapatnam and Hyderabad. In 2022, AdaniConneX announced that it was building a hyperscale data center in Kolkata's Bengal Silicon Valley tech hub.

=== Adani Digital Labs ===
Adani Digital Labs was incorporated in September 2021 as a wholly owned subsidiary of Adani Enterprises, to build a digital platform for the consumers of Adani Group's B2C businesses. In December 2022, the company made the alpha release of the mobile app, named "Adani One", with the integration of the group's airport vertical. In 2023, Adani Digital Labs acquired a 100% stake in Trainman, an online train ticket booking platform.

=== AMG Media Networks ===
AMG Media Networks was incorporated in April 2022 as a wholly owned media and publishing subsidiary of Adani Enterprises. In May 2022, AMG Media Networks announced the acquisition of a 49% stake in Quintillion Business Media Ltd, which operates BQ Prime, for an undisclosed amount. Adani Enterprises had previously acquired an unspecified minority stake in the company in March 2022. In August 2022, AMG Media Networks announced the acquisition of a 29.18% stake in NDTV through its subsidiary. In December 2022, it acquired an additional 8.27% stake via a tender offer and 27.26% stake from the promoters Radhika Roy and Prannoy Roy, to raise its total shareholding in NDTV to over 64%. In November 2023, AMG Media Networks raised its stake in BQ Prime to 100% and rebranded BQ Prime as NDTV Profit, which had been shut down since June 2018.

In December 2023, AMG Media Networks acquired a 50.50% controlling stake in Indo-Asian News Service (IANS).

== Former subsidiaries ==
Former subsidiaries Adani Ports & SEZ, Adani Power and Adani Transmission were demerged from Adani Enterprises in 2015. Adani Green Energy and Adani Gas were demerged in 2018.

Adani Cementation or Adani Cement Industries Limited (ACIL) was incorporated in June 2021 as a subsidiary of Adani Enterprises. It was reported in June 2021 that the Adani Group planned to set up a cement plant in Maharashtra which will have an initial capacity of 5-Million tonnes per annum with an approximate investment of ₹900-1,000 crore. In 2024, Adani Cementation was merged with Ambuja Cements in a share swap deal in which Adani Enterprises obtained 87 lakh shares of Ambuja Cements.

== Investments ==
In 2021, Adani Enterprises acquired a 20% stake in the online travel company Cleartrip. Adani Enterprises acquired a 49% stake in Maharashtra Border Check Post Network, a subsidiary of the publicly listed Sadbhav Infrastructure Projects.

== Controversies ==
=== Opposition to Carmichael mine ===
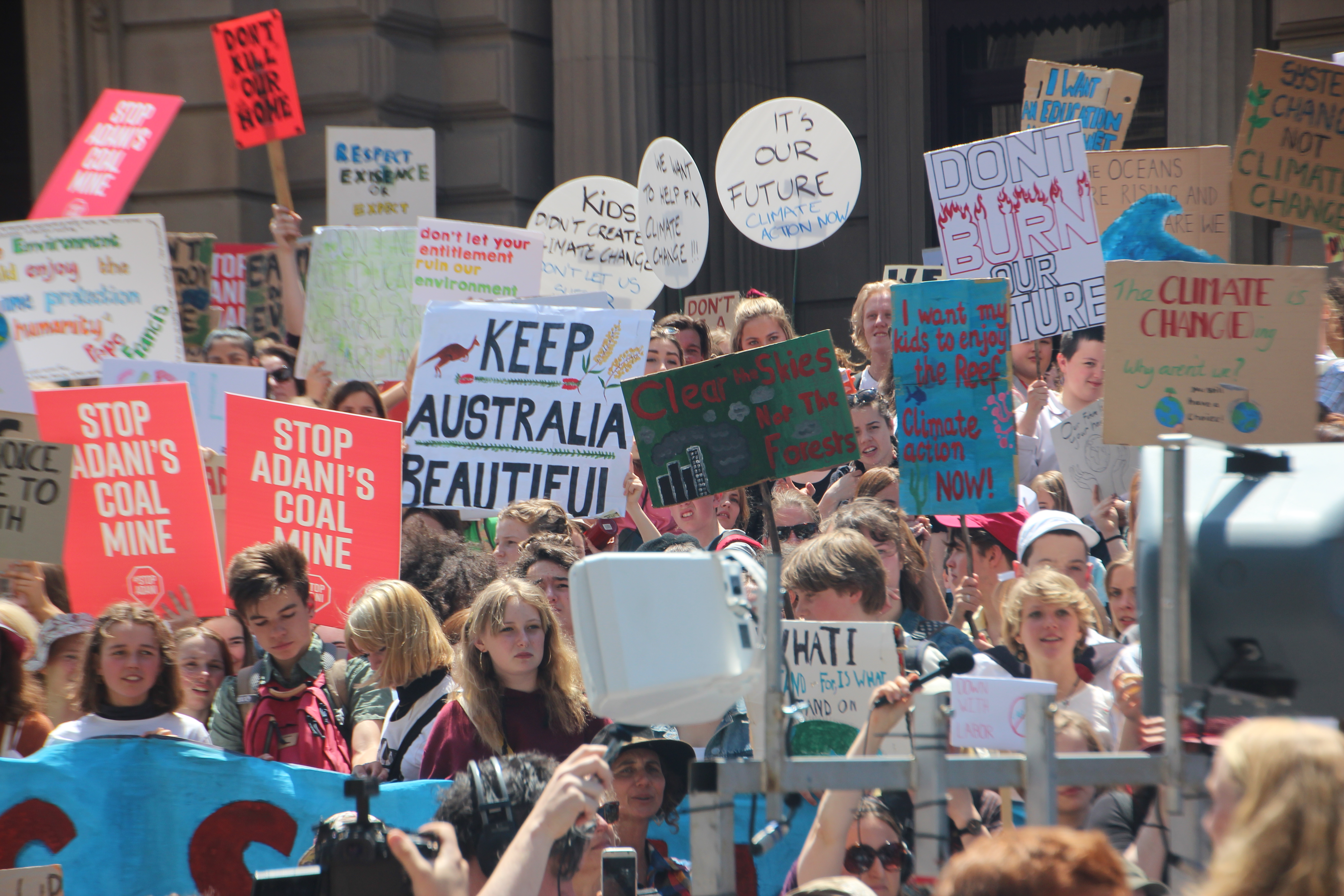
A protest in Melbourne.

The Carmichael coal mine project has faced environmental protests across Australia since the mine was proposed in 2010. The pressure from environmental groups forced international banks and financial institutions to not lend to the project, and resulted in a long delay in securing environmental clearances. In 2018, Adani Group scaled down the mine's capacity and self-financed the project. An indigenous group of the region went to court seeking invalidation of the indigenous land use agreement which was approved by its representatives, but the appeal was dismissed by the Federal Court in 2019. The mine made its first coal shipment in December 2021.

=== Allegations of stock manipulation ===
On 24 January 2023, Hindenburg Research published the findings of a two-year investigation claiming that Adani had engaged in market manipulation and accounting malpractices. Hindenburg also disclosed that it was holding short positions on Adani Group companies. Bonds and shares of companies associated with Adani experienced a decline in value after the accusations. Adani denied the fraud allegations as unfounded and ill-intentioned. On 26 January 2023, Adani Group expressed its intention of taking legal action against Hindenburg.
