= Vehicle Production Group =

The Vehicle Production Group
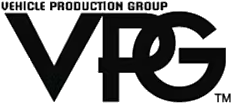
- Industry: Automotive
- Founded: 2011
- Defunct: 2013; 13 years ago
- Successor: Mobility Ventures
- Headquarters: Miami, U.S.
- Area served: U.S.
- Key people: John Walsh (CEO); Fred Drasner (Chairman)
- Products: MV-1

The Vehicle Production Group LLC (commonly referred as VPG) was an American automobile manufacturer. Based in Miami, Florida, it made the wheelchair-accessible taxicabs, the "MV-1" (Mobility Vehicle-1), which was built in Mishawaka, Indiana at an AM General plant.

== History ==
Production began in 2011, but by February 2013, Vehicle Production Group ceased production of new vehicles. The company laid off all employees and closed its doors in May 2013 after their finances dropped below the minimum condition of a $50 million clean-energy loan awarded by the US Department of Energy in March 2011. AM General reached an agreement with the Department of Energy to acquire the assets of VPG in September 2013, after it had purchased the $50 million DOE loan for $3 million.

AM General then created "Mobility Ventures", a wholly owned subsidiary to again produce and distribute the MV-1 through its dealer network. Production restarted on March 11, 2014.

== Vehicles ==
=== Standard Taxi ===
Standard Taxi

Overview
- Manufacturer: The Vehicle Production Group LLC

Body and chassis
- Class: Minivan
- Body style: 4-door minivan
- Layout: Front-engine, rear-wheel-drive

Dimensions
- Wheelbase: 118.0 in (2,997 mm)
- Length: 196.5 in (4,991 mm)
- Width: 79.4 in (2,017 mm)
- Height: 75.0 in (1,905 mm)

Chronology
- Successor: MV-1

The Standard Taxi was a purpose-built taxicab prototype designed by Vehicle Production Group. It was unveiled at the 2005 International Association of Transportation Regulators (IATR) conference and later that year at the Taxicab, Limousine, and Paratransit Association (TLPA) annual convention in Las Vegas.

In mid-2008, it was announced that a contract had been signed with South Bend, Indiana-based AM General to build the Standard Taxi taxicabs, beginning in 2009.

Through market feedback, VPG developed a more advanced and user-friendly vehicle known as the MV-1 to replace the Standard Taxi, which never entered series production. The Standard Taxi was meant to have been fitted with General Motors' 4.3-liter, fuel injected Vortec V6 engine. The fuel tank held 24 US gal (91 L).

=== MV-1 ===
MV-1
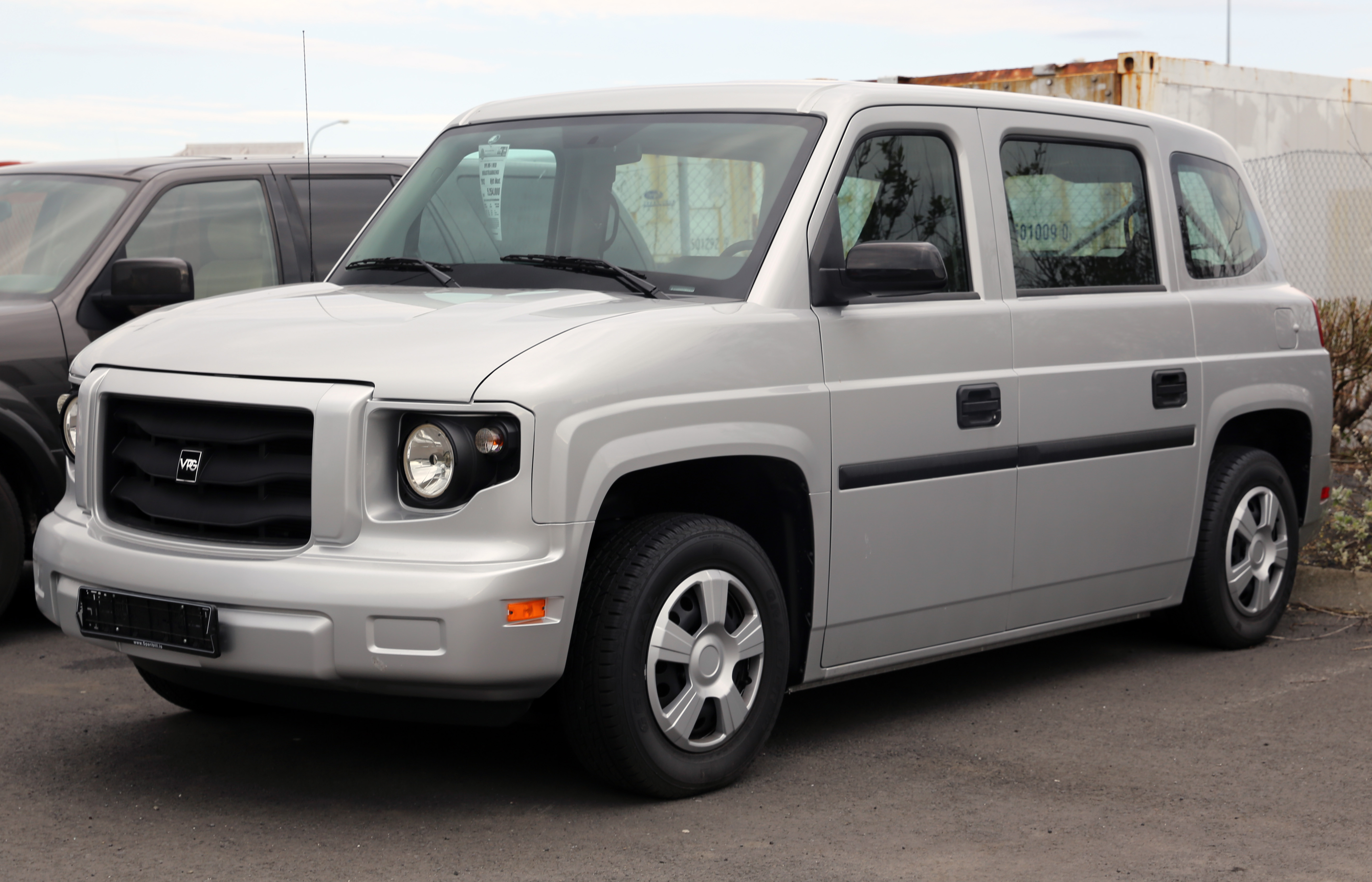

Overview
- Manufacturer: AM General under contract from Vehicle Production Group
- Production: 2011–2016
- Assembly: Mishawaka, Indiana

Body and chassis
- Class: Minivan
- Body style: 4-door
- Layout: Front-engine, rear-wheel-drive

Powertrain
- Engine: 4.6 L Ford Modular V8 (2011–2014); 3.7 L Cyclone V6 (2015–2016)
- Transmission: 4-speed automatic (until 2014); 6-speed automatic (2015–2016)

Dimensions
- Wheelbase: 122.0 in (3,099 mm)
- Length: 205.0 in (5,207 mm)
- Width: 79.4 in (2,017 mm)
- Height: 75.0 in (1,905 mm)
- Curb weight: 6,600 lb (2,994 kg) (GVWR)

Chronology
- Predecessor: Standard Taxi

The MV-1 was a purpose-built taxicab designed by Vehicle Production Group and built in Mishawaka, Indiana at an AM General plant The name is an initialism for "Mobility Vehicle 1". It was intended to replace the planned Standard Taxi, and like that car it was developed in collaboration with AM General. The first MV-1 rolled off the line in October 2011 and was delivered to disabled former American football player Marc Buoniconti, who was a company spokesperson.

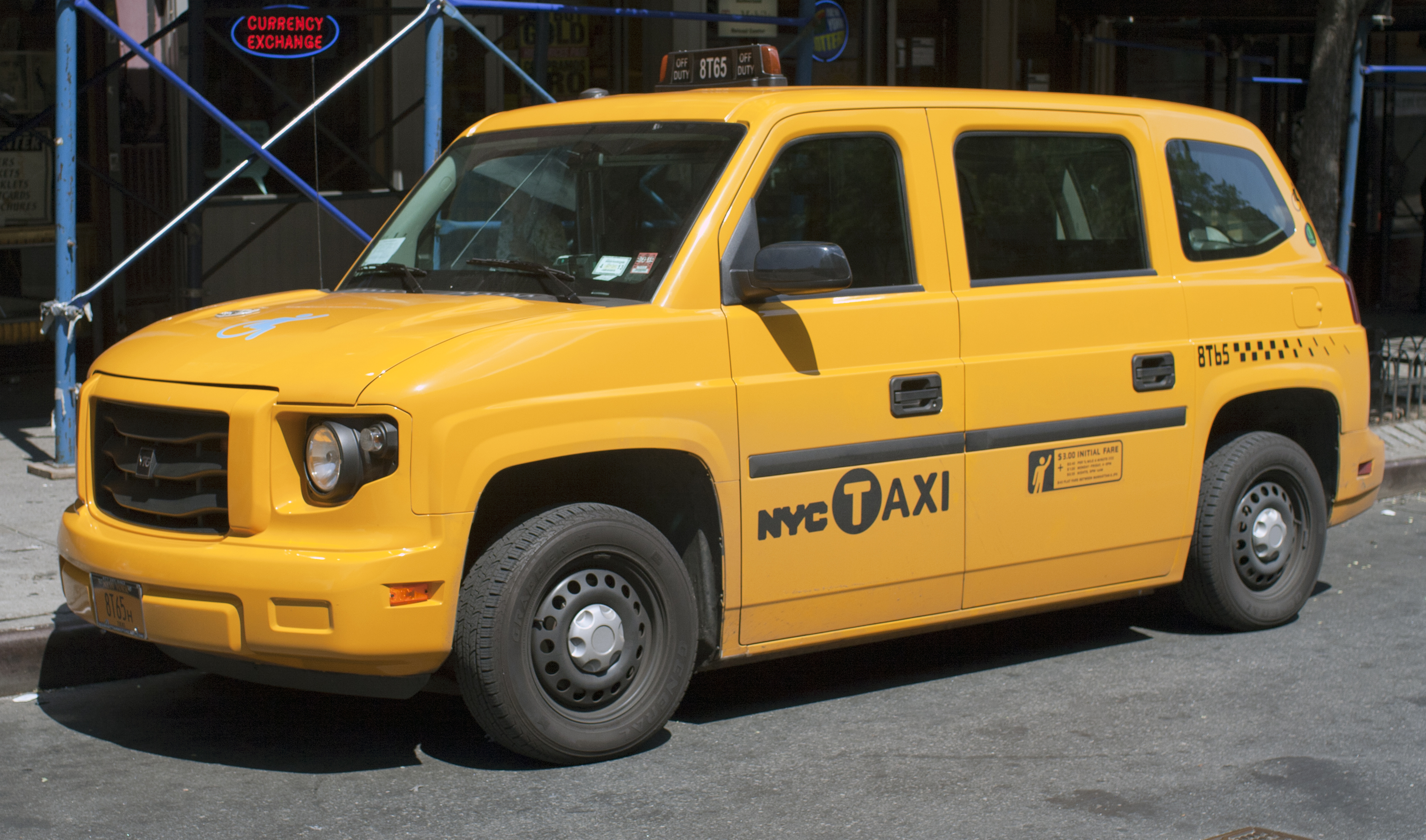
2012 MV-1 yellow cab

Developed from the Standard Taxi, it was a more advanced and user-friendly vehicle than its predecessor. The MV-1 was the first production-made purpose-built vehicle in North America constructed from the ground up for people with disabilities. It seats up to six adults, with two full-size wheelchairs. Chairs are allowed entry via an ADA-approved ramp, able to carry 1,200 lb (544 kg) and which stows under the vehicle's floor. The rear doors are 36 inches (91 cm) wide and 56 inches (140 cm) tall, to accommodate bulky wheelchairs.

On 21 October 2011, it was announced that New York City's Taxi and Limousine Commission had approved the MV-1 for use as a yellow cab. Because it was handicap accessible, the MV-1 was to continue to be approved for taxi use even after the new Nissan NV200 was intended to replace all other yellow cabs. The MV-1 was the first purpose-built taxicab to be allowed to enter service as a yellow cab since the iconic Checker Marathon.

==== Specifications ====
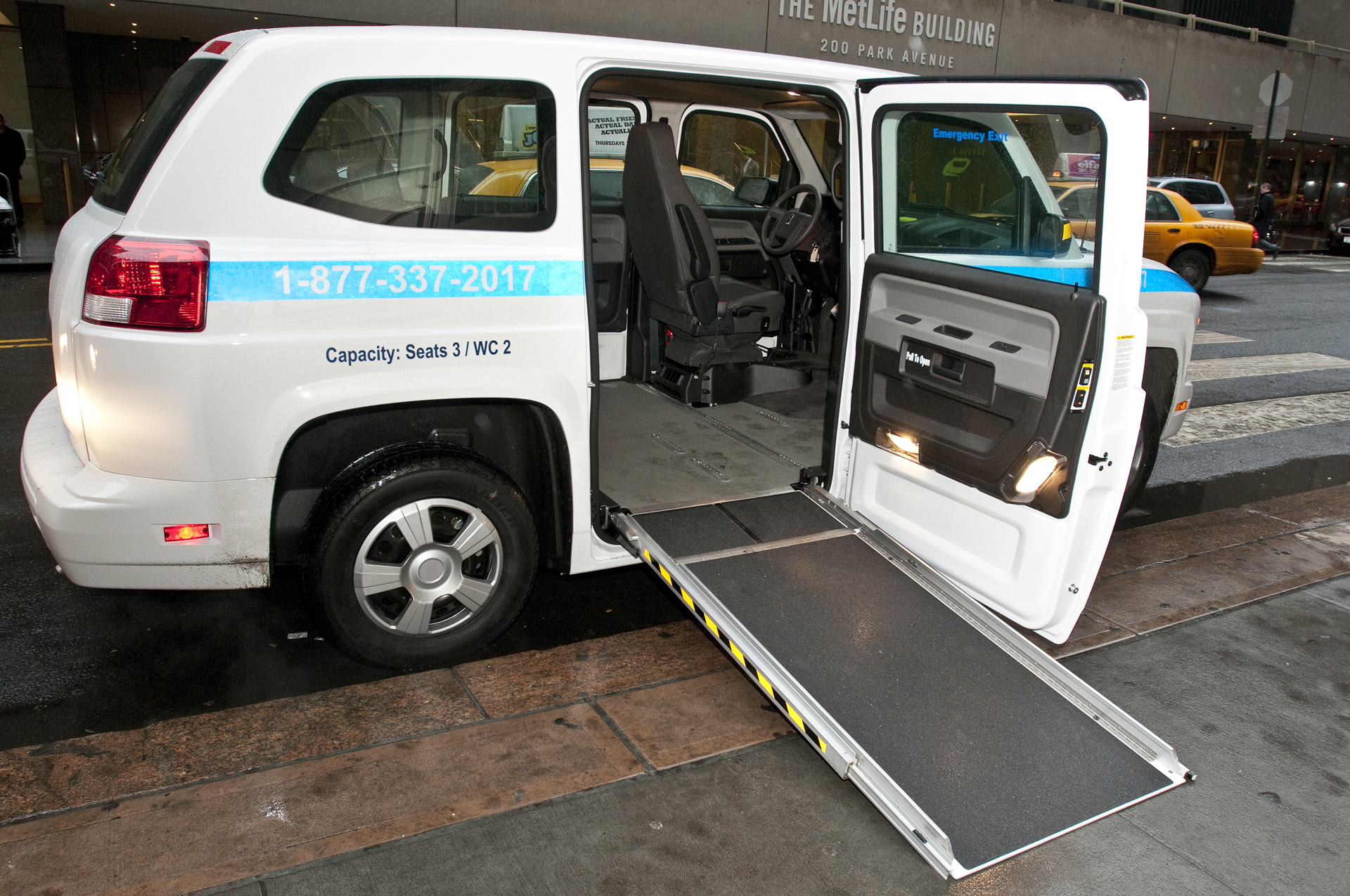
Side view of the MV-1, in use by "Access-A-Ride", NYC's paratransit system

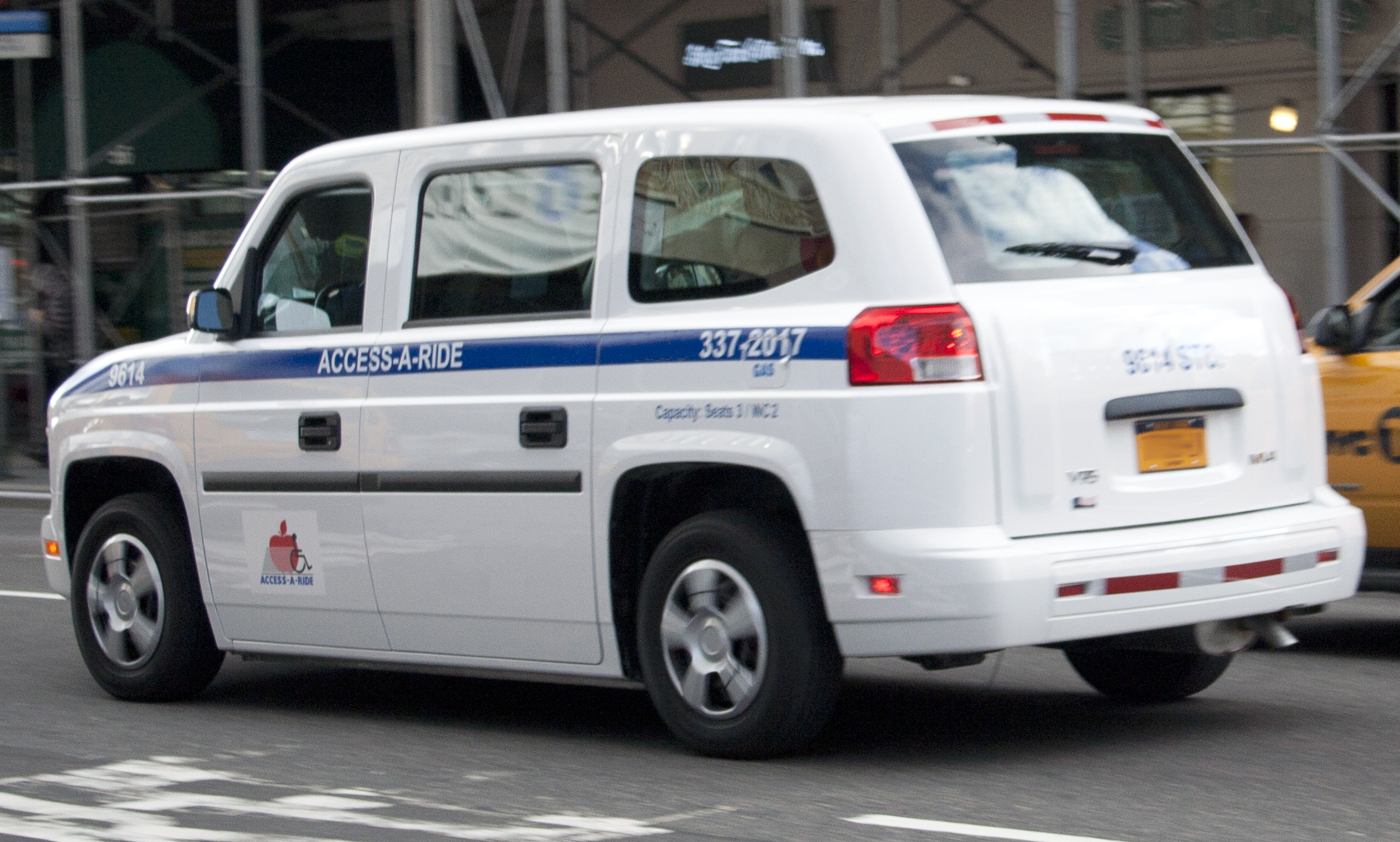
VPG MV-1, NYC's paratransit system

Originally, the MV-1 was to be based on a General Motors pickup truck with a standard GM drivetrain. Instead, the concept version had a Roush-designed chassis and a powertrain from a Ford Crown Victoria. In either case, it has a simple but sturdy body-on-frame construction with fully boxed rails. The engine is the well-known Ford Modular 4.6-liter V8 which produces 248 hp (185 kW). VPG had partnered with Clean Energy Inc, the largest provider of compressed natural gas (CNG) for fleets in North America, to offer the MV-1 with a CNG fuel option. The MV-1 with CNG has an estimated 290-mile (470 km) range with three Type-3 tanks integrated into the vehicle's design.

Production was temporarily halted in the summer of 2012 as VPG changed its tooling in order to introduce the MV-1 LX, a more luxurious version. The LX allows the access ramp to be controlled from the keyfob, and also has some wood trim and other luxury features. The 2015–2016 model is powered by a newer Ford 3.7L Ti-VCT V6. Fuel economy is 14 mpg_{‑US} (17 L/100 km; 17 mpg_{‑imp}) city, 16 mpg_{‑US} (15 L/100 km; 19 mpg_{‑imp}) highway, and 15 mpg_{‑US} (16 L/100 km; 18 mpg_{‑imp}) combined.

In 2016, Silicon Valley based SF Motors made an offer to AM General to purchase the Mishawaka plant where the MV-1 was made. AM General accepted the offer. When SF Motors took control, they ended all MV-1 production.

The vehicle played a part in the Paul Rudd movie, The Fundamentals of Caring in 2016.
