= AM General =

American heavy vehicle manufacturer

AM General LLC
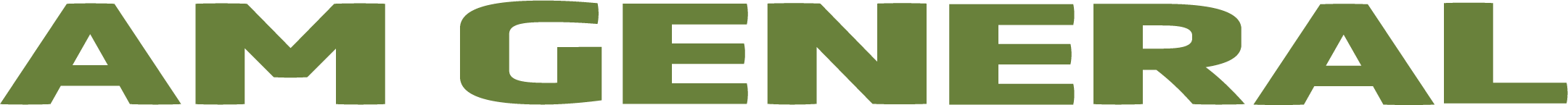

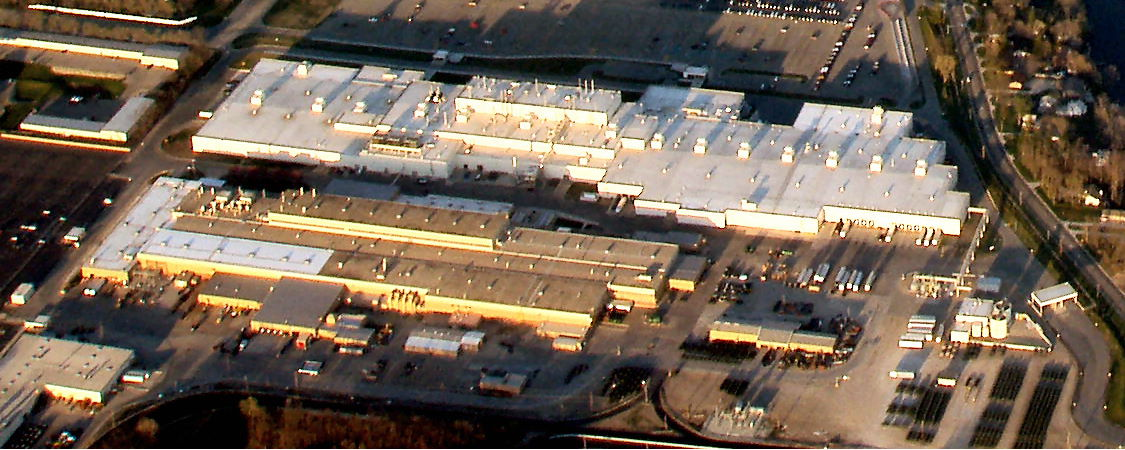
- AM General's Mishawaka Manufacturing Campus, in Indiana, 2021
- Type: Portfolio company
- Industry: Automotive
- Predecessor: Kaiser Jeep
- Founded: 1971; 55 years ago
- Founder: American Motors
- Headquarters: South Bend, Indiana, U.S.
- Area served: Worldwide
- Key people: James Cannon (CEO)
- Products: HMMWV; M35 trucks; M939 trucks; Humvee C-Series; Hummer H2 (Note: Only manufactured that model (2002–09) under contract from General Motors); Mercedes-Benz R-Class (Note: Only manufactured that model under contract.)
- Revenue: 740,000,000 United States dollar (2012)
- Parent: KPS Capital Partners (2020–)
- Subsidiaries: General Engine Products; General Transmission Products
- Website: amgeneral.com

AM General is an American heavy vehicle and contract automotive manufacturer based in South Bend, Indiana. It is best known for the civilian Hummer and the military Humvee that are assembled in Mishawaka, Indiana. From 1974 through 1979, the company also manufactured transit buses, making more than 5,400 of them.

AM General has also been a provider of vehicles for the CUCV program carried out by the United States Armed Forces.

== History ==
=== Beginning ===
AM General traces its roots to the Standard Wheel Company of Terre Haute, Indiana, which expanded in 1903 to include the Overland Automotive Division. In 1908, John North Willys purchased the Overland company, then based in Indianapolis, Indiana, and renamed it Willys-Overland Motors. In 1941, the U.S. Army awarded a contract to Willys-Overland Motor Company to produce the Willys MB, also known as the Jeep, for the U.S. Infantry. It then mass-produced that vehicle as "America's first four-wheel-drive, one-fourth-ton, tactical utility truck"—the Jeep of World War II fame.

In 1953, Kaiser Motors purchased Willys-Overland, changing its name first to Kaiser-Willys Motor Company, and in 1963, to Kaiser-Jeep Corporation. In 1970, it was purchased by American Motors Corporation (AMC). In July 2020, KPS Capital Partners acquired the company.

=== Defense and Government Products Division ===
In 1964, Kaiser-Jeep purchased the Studebaker facilities on Chippewa Avenue in South Bend, Indiana, Studebaker's "General Products Division", and its substantial defense contracts.

At the time, Kaiser had been awarded a US$87 million Army truck contract, and under government pressure, agreed to perform the work at the South Bend plant it had recently acquired from Studebaker.

=== American Motors ===
In 1970, American Motors Corporation (AMC) purchased the Jeep Corporation from Kaiser, when Kaiser decided to leave the auto business.

In 1971, AMC made the General Products Division of Jeep (producing military trucks as well as contract and non-commercial vehicles) a wholly owned subsidiary and renamed it "AM General Corporation".

In 1982, American Motors ceased to function as an independent automaker when Renault purchased a total 46.1% interest.

Federal government regulations at that time forbade ownership of defense contractors by foreign governments — and the French government partially owned Renault.

=== LTV Corporation ===
In 1983, LTV Corporation bought AM General and established it as a wholly owned subsidiary. In 1984, its headquarters moved from the American Motors AMTEK Building in Detroit, Michigan, to Livonia, Michigan, and two years later to South Bend, Indiana, where primary manufacturing operations were located.

=== Renco Group ===
In 1992, AM General was sold to Renco Group, which in 2002 converted it to a limited liability company.

=== Hummer brand ===
In 1984, AM General built a factory for HMMWV production at 13200 McKinley Hwy in Mishawaka.

In 1992, AM General began marketing the HMMWV to the civilian market under the Hummer brand. In 1999, GM acquired the rights to the brand and continued production of the original civilian Hummer as the H1 until June 2006.

In 2002, the Hummer H2 went on the market and was produced until January 2009. It was designed and marketed by GM, and manufactured by AM General at the Mishawaka plant. AM General did not build the H3 model.

GM was sued early in 2003 by DaimlerChrysler, owners of the Jeep brand, for the resemblance of the Hummer's seven-slot grille to Jeep's. The lawsuit was dismissed after acknowledgment of the shared corporate history of AMC and Jeep. General Motors in turn sued boutique automaker Avanti Motor Corporation of Cancun, Mexico after it introduced the Studebaker XUV at the Chicago Auto show in 2002. General Motors said Avanti infringed on Hummer's look by planning a vehicle resembling the Hummer. The AM General Hummer line had returned to the original Studebaker General Products Division, responsible for all military contracts.

=== 2004–present ===
In August 2004, it was announced that Ronald Perelman's MacAndrews & Forbes company would form a joint venture with AM General's then-owner, Renco Group, to give Perelman 70% ownership. The deal reportedly cost close to US$1 billion.

In 2008, AM General and the Vehicle Production Group (VPG), of Troy, Michigan, announced that contracts had been signed for AM General to begin producing purpose-built taxi-cabs in 2009. Production began in October 2011. The first vehicle off the line was presented to Marc Buoniconti, a former linebacker for The Citadel who was partially paralyzed in 1985.

In May 2010, Azure Dynamics announced it had chosen AM General to assemble its electric drivetrain for Ford Transit Connect vehicles for the North American market at its Livonia, Michigan, factory.

In September 2013, AM General reached an agreement to purchase the United States Department of Energy's secured loan to the Vehicle Production Group (VPG). Prior to this, AM General acted as the sole vehicle assembler for VPG. As a result of this transaction, AM General created a wholly owned company, Mobility Ventures LLC, to operate the Mobility Vehicle-1 (MV-1) business and receive all VPG assets.

In 2015, production of the Mercedes-Benz R-Class began at the Mishawaka assembly plant. Without this deal, "the German automaker would likely have had to shut down production of the vehicle, currently only sold in China." Production ended in October 2017.

In July 2020, investment company KPS Capital Partners acquired AM General from its previous owner, MacAndrews & Forbes.

AM General submitted a prototype to become the United States Postal Service's Next Generation Delivery Vehicle, but their entry was not chosen.

== Products ==
=== Jeep Dispatcher 100 ===
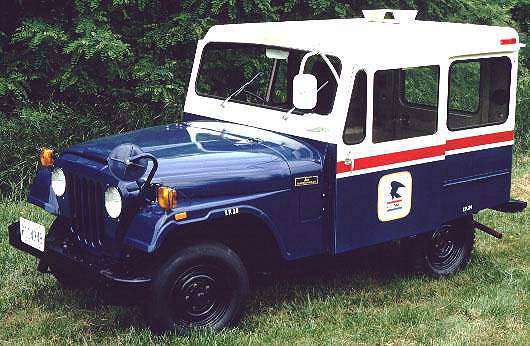
A 1975 AM General RWD postal delivery van

The Jeep DJ-5 series was a purpose-built "Dispatch Jeep" two-wheel drive (RWD) version of the Jeep CJ-5. They became widely used by the United States Postal Service during the 1970s and 1980s. Although featuring an automatic transmission, they were rudimentary and built with a lighter, less durable design than the standard Jeep models. The USPS specified right-hand drive to reach mailboxes without leaving the vehicle's seat, an enclosed metal cabin with sliding sided doors, open rear cargo area, and a single seat with a sorting table on the left side for carriers to help process mail along their routes.

=== Buses ===
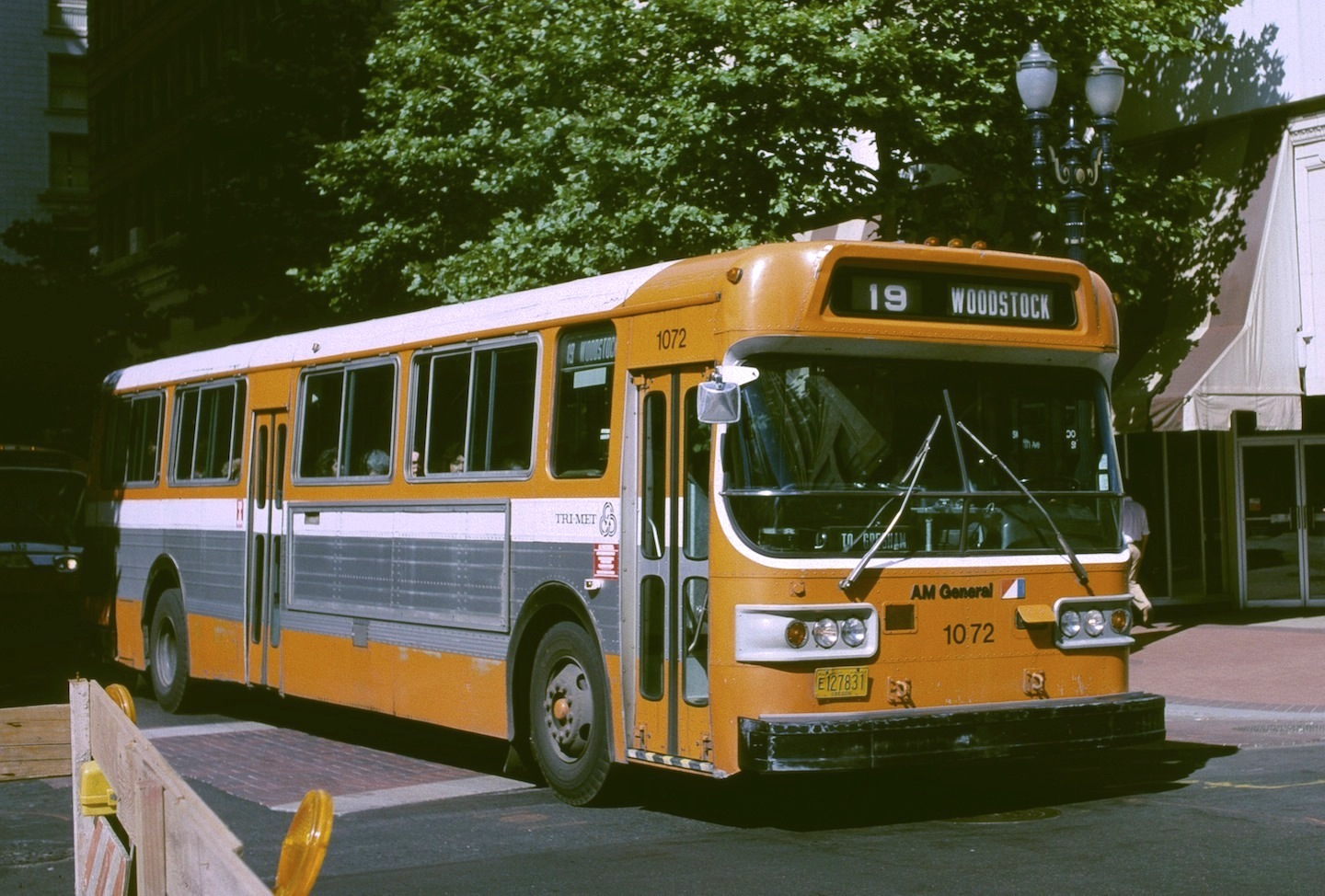
A 1976 AM General bus of Tri-Met, in Portland, Oregon, with an AM General logo on the front

The AM General Metropolitan buses were manufactured for city transit use from 1974 until 1979, producing a total of 5,431 buses, including 219 electric trolley buses. The Metropolitan was built under a 1971 agreement with Flyer Industries of Winnipeg, Manitoba. AM General licensed the rights to build and market the Western Flyer D700 for the U.S. market. The D700 itself was similar in design to the contemporaneous GM New Look buses.

The front end of the D700 was restyled, and thus the resulting Metropolitan was not simply a Flyer design built under license but rather a jointly designed vehicle. Flyer later adopted the design changes for its own line as the models D800 and E800. Buses were built in lengths of either 35 ft (10.7 m) or 40 ft (12.2 m), and widths of 96 in (2,438 mm) or 102 in (2,591 mm).

The model numbers reflected the chosen dimensions. For example, model "10240" indicated a 102-inch wide, 40-foot long bus. Suffixes "A" or "B" were used for later models to indicate certain options. In total, 3,571 40-foot diesel buses and 1,641 35-foot diesel buses were produced.

=== Articulated buses ===
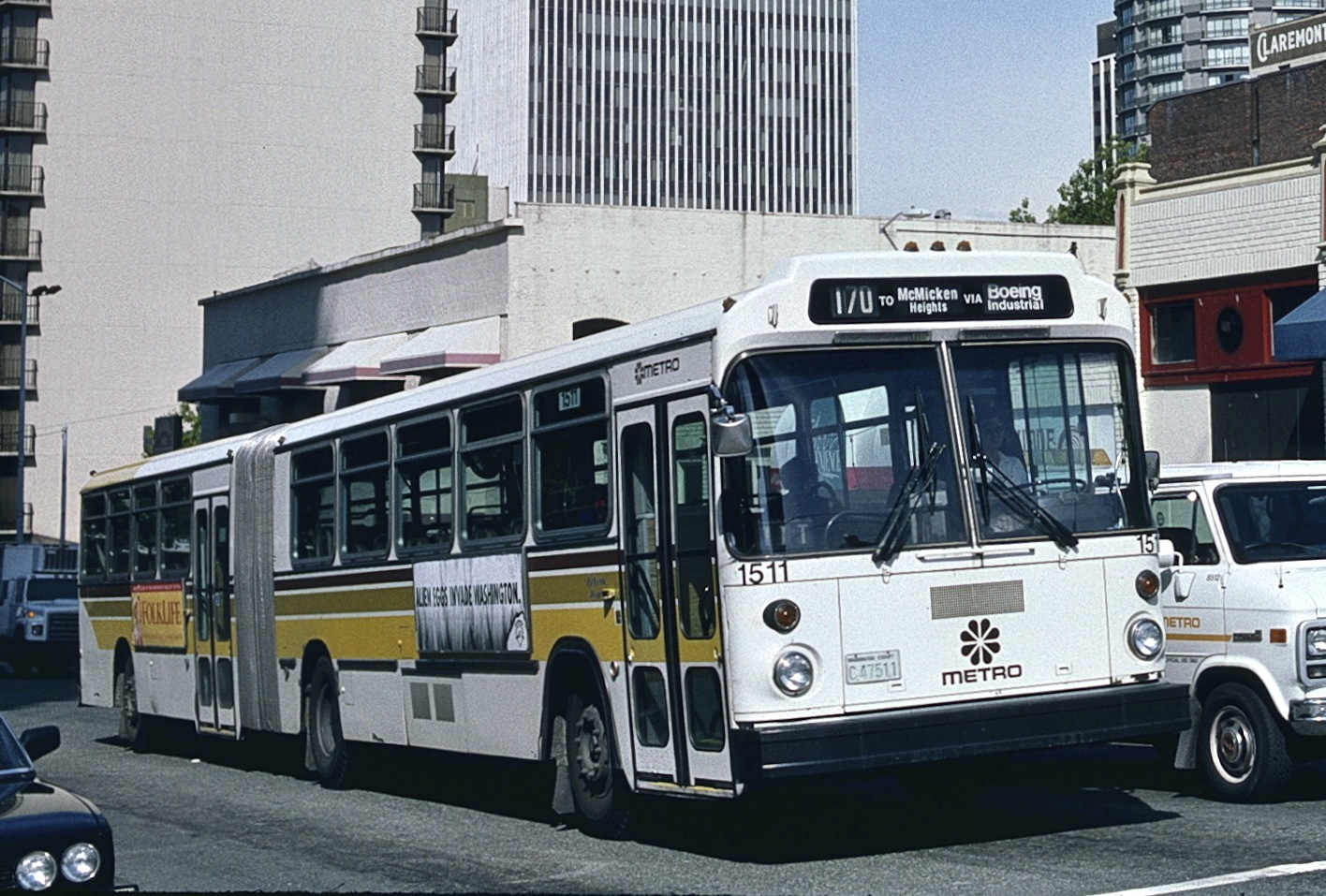
A MAN articulated bus in Seattle that was completed by AM General

In 1977–1979, AM General worked under a partnership with MAN of Germany to build SG 220 articulated buses for U.S. transit systems. MAN fabricated the bodyshells in Germany and shipped them to the U.S. for AM General for final assembly. Two different lengths were offered, 55 ft (16.8 m) and 60 ft (18.3 m). 93 buses were built to the shorter length and the rest were 60 feet long. In October 1978, the company discontinued bus production, with the last unit completed in March 1979. The total number built was just under 400 (392 or 399), the largest group being 150 for Seattle's Metro Transit. MAN subsequently set up its own factory for U.S. production in Cleveland, North Carolina.

=== Trolleybuses ===
Production of complete motor buses (and of any two-axle motor buses) ended in 1978. Aside from the fitting-out of the last articulated MAN shells, the only production in 1979 was two batches of trolleybuses, the only such vehicles ever built by the company. These were all 40-foot (12.2 m) vehicles, model 10240T: 110 trackless trolleys for the Philadelphia trolleybus system, operated by SEPTA, and 109 for the Seattle trolleybus system, operated by Metro Transit, now King County Metro. One of the latter has been preserved since its retirement in 2003 by King County Metro (see King County Metro fleet).

== U.S. Department of Defense projects ==
=== Development and production of the HMMWV ===
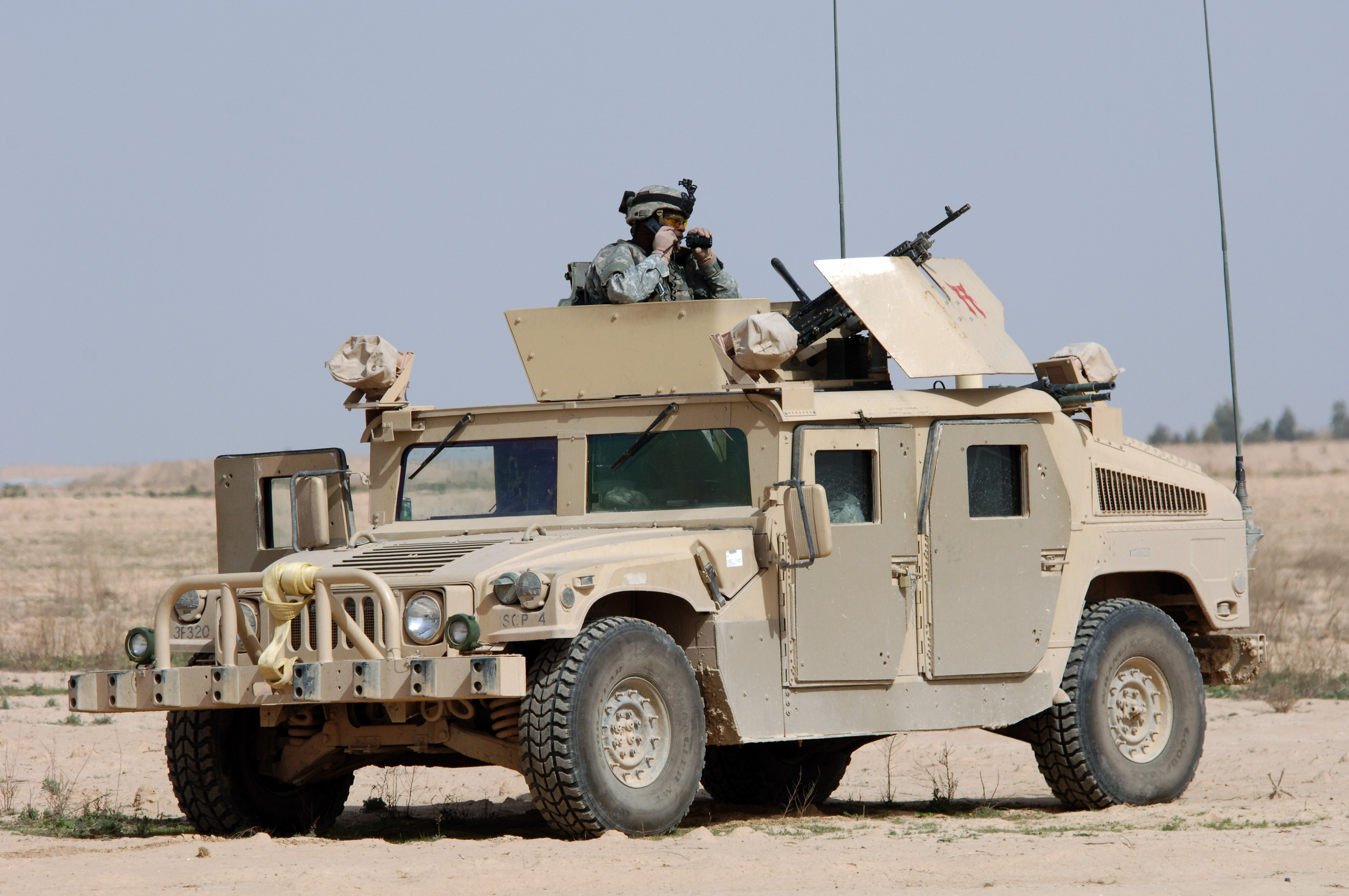
An AM General HMMWV in Iraq

In 1979, AM General began preliminary design work on the M998 Series High Mobility Multi-Purpose Wheeled Vehicle HMMWV, pronounced Humvee, a 1.25-ton truck intended to replace the M151 and other Light Utility Vehicles. In 1981, the U.S. Army awarded AM General a prototype contract. In 1982, development and operational testing was conducted over a five-month period. In March 1983, AM General won an initial $1.2 billion contract to produce 55,000 Humvees, to be delivered in five basic models and 15 different configurations over a five-year period.

In the fall of 1984, production began at the Mishawaka, Indiana, assembly plant. In early 1985, the first deliveries were made. The total international production by mid-1991 was more than 72,000. After 1991, an additional 20,000 HMMWVs ordered brought total international production to 100,000 in March 1995.

Late in 2000, AM General was awarded another contract for 2,962 M998A2 series trucks. The contract contained six single-year options running to the fiscal year 2007 and continues to be renewed. Nearly 250,000 units have been produced.

Humvees feature full-time four-wheel drive, an independent suspension, steep approach and departure angles, 60-percent grade ability and 16 inches (406 mm) of ground clearance. More recent production models include the M1151, M1152, M1165, and M1167. As of 2015, Humvees are in use by the U.S. Army, Marine Corps, Air Force, and Navy. The combined fleet numbers 140,000. More than 50 nations have bought these vehicles.

==== Replacement ====
The Humvee's replacement, a completely new Joint Light Tactical Vehicle (JLTV) design, has been in production by Oshkosh Corporation since 2016. AM General was unsuccessful in its bid for this $30-billion 25-year contract, and it is now focused on military Humvee support (they still outnumber JLTVs by three to one) and development of a new ambulance model.

In February 2023, the U.S. Army granted AM General a production contract worth more than $8.66bn to deliver next-generation JLTV A2 vehicles, under the Army and Marine Corps’ Joint Light Tactical Vehicle (JLTV) program.

Under the contract, AM General will produce approximately 20,682 JLTV vehicles and 9,883 trailers. The contract includes the integration of technological enhancements for delivery to the U.S. Armed Forces.

Oshkosh Defense won the initial contract to supply its JLTV vehicles for the program.

=== U.S. Army Mobile Tactical Cannon ===
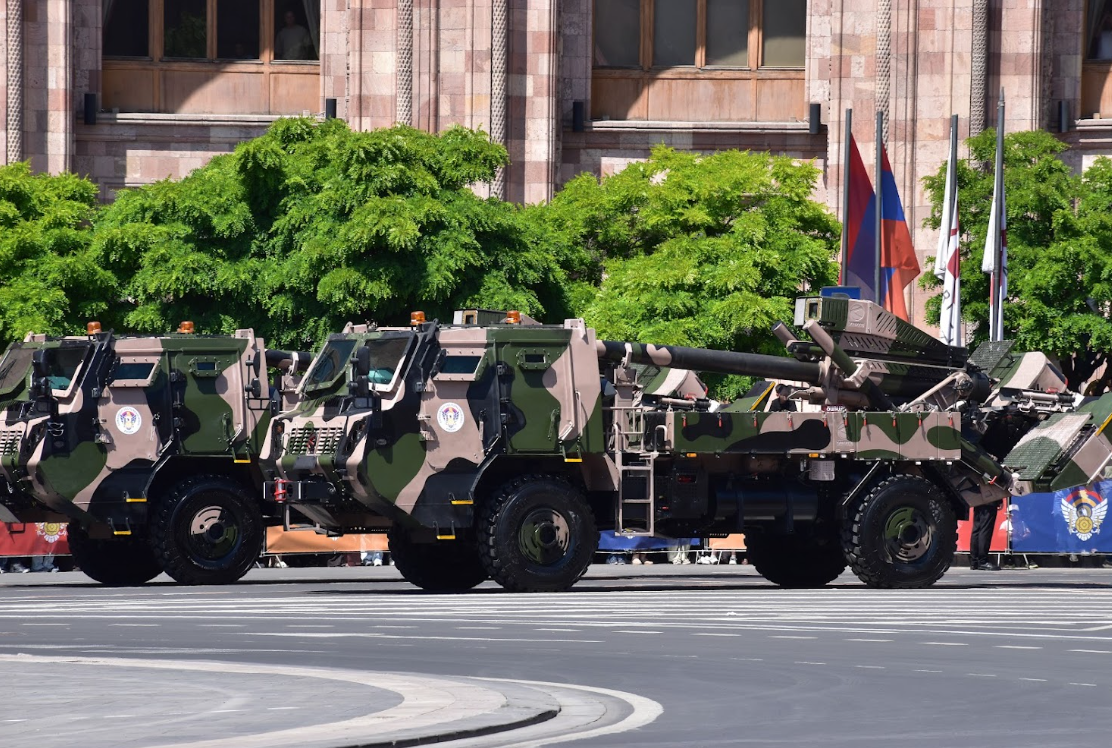
An early variant of the MArG in service with the Armenian Ground Forces

AM General plans to participate in the Mobile Tactical Cannon (MTC) programme of the U.S. Army. They are collaborating with India's Kalyani Strategic Systems Limited (KSSL), a subsidiary of Bharat Forge, which has developed the Mounted Artillery Gun MArG-52.

By February 2025, KSSL and AM General signed a letter of intent for the supply of artillery cannons to support the latter's development of a range of 105 mm and 155 mm calibre next-generation artillery guns. On 18 June 2026, they signed a strategic partnership at the Eurosatory defense exposition.

The MArG-52 platform is claimed to be combat-relevant and a delivery is planned by 2027 once chosen. The system will be integrated with the patented Soft Recoil Technology (SRT) Recoil Mitigation system, an automated load-assist, and an all-weather fire-control suite providing indirect and direct fire capabilities. It fires a standard high-explosive ammunition at a maximum range of up to 40 km (25 mi) and has a capacity to carry 20 rounds and propellant charges on board.

However, in August 2026, the U.S. Army announced the selection of Hanwha Defense USA to supply six prototypes of the 155mm K9 Mobile Howitzer, a wheeled variant based on K9 Thunder, for further trials with an option contract for additional 12 prototypes.

=== Other military vehicles ===
AM General also acquired Department of Defense contracts for medium and heavy trucks, including the M151 series, 2 1/2 ton M35 series, and 5 ton M809 series in the 1970s, then the M939 series in the 1980s.

In 2005, AM General was contracted to take over militarization, sales, and marketing of LSSV vehicles.

== Political activity ==
AM General operates an employee political action committee. In 2015, it supported the campaign of John McCain. It supported the campaigns of Susan Collins, Ken Calvert, Chris Coons, Todd Young, Jim Banks, Frank Mrvan, and Betty McCollum in 2025 and 2026.
