= MArG 155-BR =

Mounted Gun System

Multi-terrain Artillery Gun (MArG)
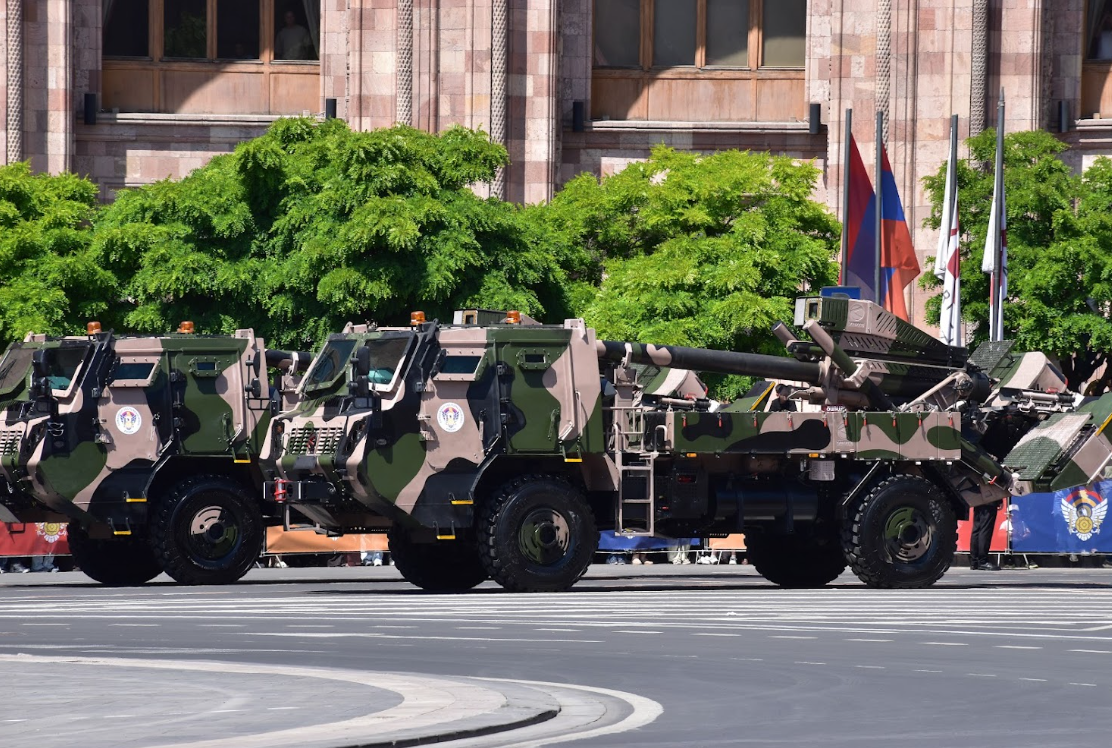
- MArG of the Armenian Ground Forces
- Type: Truck-mounted self-propelled howitzer
- Place of origin: India

Service history
- Used by: Armenian Ground Forces

Production history
- Designer: Kalyani Strategic Systems
- Manufacturer: Bharat Forge
- Produced: 2020–present
- Variants: MArG 39; MArG 45; MArG 52

Specifications
- Mass: 22 tonnes (22 long tons; 24 short tons) - MaRG 39; 23.5 tonnes (23.1 long tons; 25.9 short tons) - MaRG 45; 25.5 tonnes (25.1 long tons; 28.1 short tons) - MaRG 52
- Length: 9,391 mm (369.7 in)
- Width: 2,650 mm (104 in)
- Height: 3,160 mm (124 in)
- Crew: up to 6 personnel
- Caliber: 155 mm/39 calibre; 155 mm/45 calibre; 155 mm/52 calibre
- Elevation: -2°/+72°
- Traverse: 25°
- Rate of fire: Burst 3 shots in 30 seconds; Intense: 10 rounds in 3 minutes (MaRG 39); 10 rounds in 3 minutes (MaRG 45); Sustained: 42 rounds in 60 minutes
- Effective firing range: 24 km (14.91 mi); 38 km (23.61 mi); 40 km (24.85 mi)

The MArG 155 is a family of 155 mm calibre self-propelled multi-terrain mounted gun system (MGS) developed by an Indian private company Kalyani Strategic Systems Limited (KSSL), a subsidiary of Bharat Forge for the Indian Army as part of Atmanirbhar Bharat, and Make in India initiative. The artillery gun is mounted on a 4x4 High Mobility Vehicle. The MaRG family supports 39-, 45- and 52-calibre guns.

With its independent suspension, automated gearbox, and tire pressure adjustment system, the MArG family can operate efficiently on challenging terrain, including slopes up to 30 degrees. MArG is named Mihr in Armenian Ground Forces service.

== Development ==
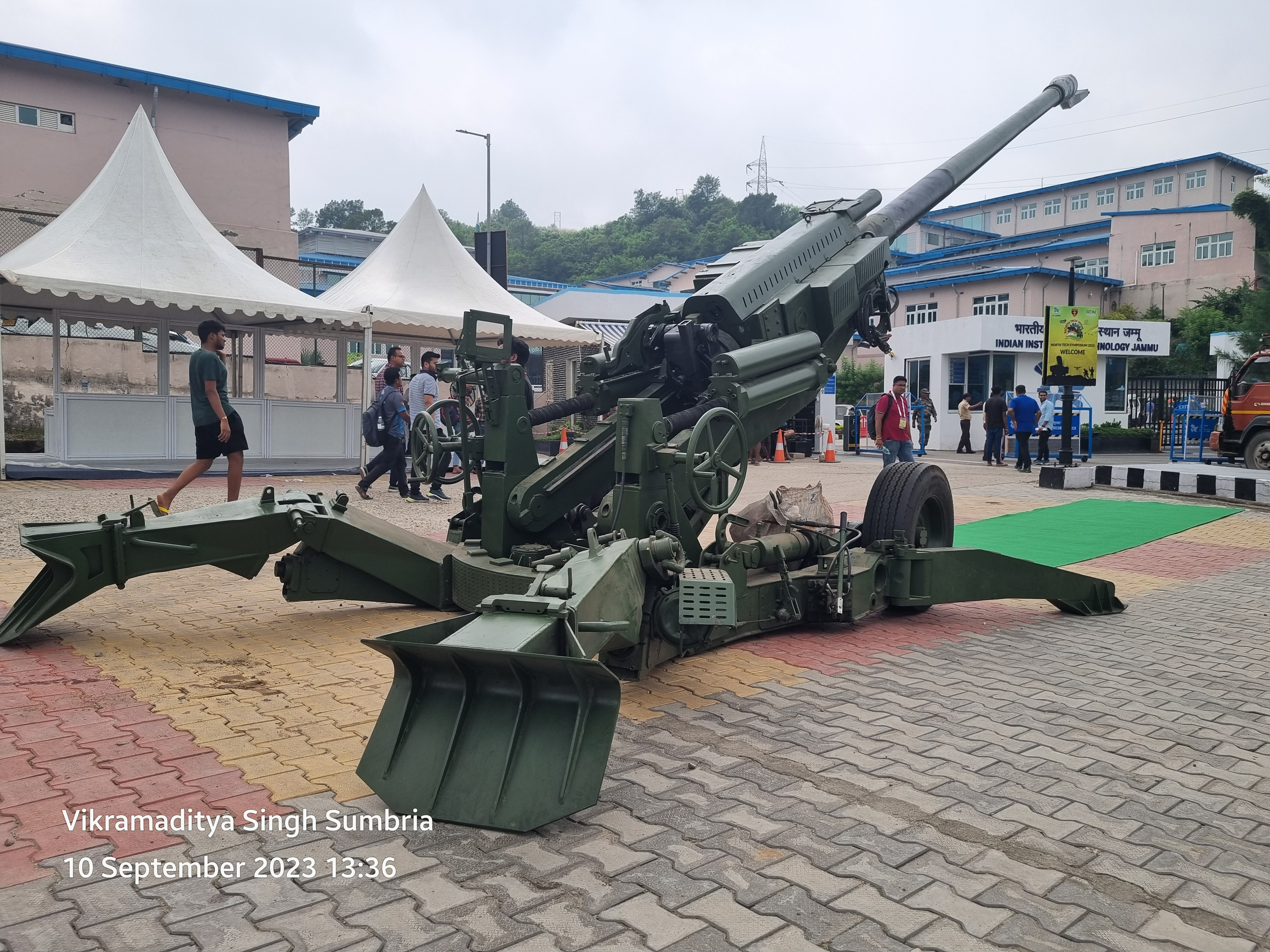
Bharat ULH 155-mm/39 caliber (Ultra-Light Howitzer) also called mountain artillery gun (MAG)

The Bharat ULH 155-mm/39 caliber (Ultra-Light Howitzer), created by Kalyani Strategic Systems, serves as the basis for the MArG 155, also known as the TS-20. Three versions of the ULH were created using various structural materials for the carriage and recoil devices: titanium (weight 4.8 tons), steel (all steel, total weight 6.8 tons), and mixed (Advance Hybrid). Based on the steel version of the ULH, the artillery unit was placed on the MArG 39-BR. The four-by-four-wheel self-propelled vehicle is based on the Kalyani's 4x4 military truck and has a six-person armored cabin. It has a contemporary fire control system installed.

On the advice of Indian Chief of Defence Staff Bipin Rawat, MArG 39-BR was developed by Bharat Forge. At DefExpo 2020, it was showcased for the first time. Mounted on a 4x4 BEML-Tatra chassis, the 7.8 tonne, 155 x 39 mm lightweight howitzer is known as the truck-mounted MArG-Steel. With an overall weight of 18 tons, the system is developed for high altitude terrain like Ladakh and Arunachal Pradesh, where it has proven logistically challenging to deploy heavy artillery. The Ilyushin Il-76 and Boeing C-17 Globemaster III are capable of airlifting the MArG. One MArG 39-BR MGS can be flown by the IL-76, and the C-17 can airlift two MArG 39-BR MGS.

Bharat Forge unveiled the Multi-terrain Artillery Gun (MArG) 39-BR on 21 December 2021, in front of Indian Chief of the Army Staff General MM Naravane, and the Defense Minister Rajnath Singh. The MaRG 39-BR is one of the few 155mm/39 caliber gun systems installed on 4x4 High Mobility Vehicle (HMV). It has the capacity to shoot-and-scoot. The Indian Armed Forces offered assistance and direction for the project's development. With a typical high-explosive fragmentation round, MaRG 39-BR can fire up to 30 km (18.64 mi) using ERFB-BB round. and MaRG 45 can fire up to 38 km (23.61 mi) using ERFB-BB round

It can fire in Zone 5 and holds 18 artillery rounds. It has a burst rate of 3 shots in 30 seconds, an intense rate of 10 rounds in 3 minutes, and a sustained rate of 42 rounds in 60 minutes. The MArG 45, which was introduced at the 2025 International Defence Exhibition in Abu Dhabi can accommodate up to six crew members in an armored cabin at the front of the vehicle in a two plus four configuration. A sizable stabilizer attached to the back of the HMV is dropped to the ground when it is necessary to transition it into combat readiness. In addition to offering a platform for the loader and room to store a spare wheel, the stabilizer aids in distributing the considerable forces that are imparted onto the vehicle during the gun's recoil.

== Variant ==
- The MArG 45 variant is a 155mm/45 caliber system which is placed on a 4x4 all-terrain high-mobility vehicle. The MaRG 45 is made to deploy quickly. It is compatible with NATO-standard and Indian Army in-service rounds and can fire conventional ammunition more than 36 km (22.37 mi) away. With Zone 6 firing capability, the system can carry 18 artillery rounds and weighs 23.5 tons in total. The chassis guarantees excellent maneuverability on a variety of terrains. It traverses 25° on both the left and right sides and ranges in elevation from -2° to +72°. For rapid-response operations in tough and inaccessible areas, the deployment time is 1.5 minutes during the day, and 2 minutes at night. MaRG can fire 10 rounds in 3 minutes at an intense rate and 42 shots in 60 minutes at a steady rate. The system was created by KSSL as a substitute for the K9 Thunder, ATMOS 2000, and CAESAR self-propelled howitzer.
- The smallest 155 mm, 52-calibre mounted gun system in the world, the MArG 52, was introduced by KSSL in 2026. It weighs 24 tons when mounted on a Kalyani 4x4 vehicle. It makes use of an autoloader and an aluminium gun carriage. It features shoot-and-scoot functionality and can fire five rounds per minute. It is a component of the progression that started with MArG 39 and continued with MArG 45. Since 155 mm L/52 calibre howitzers are typically only installed on 6x6 or 8x8 trucks, the MArG 52 is a compact weapon. The system is integrated with the patented Soft Recoil Technology (SRT) Recoil Mitigation system, an automated load-assist, and an all-weather fire-control suite providing indirect and direct fire capabilities. It fires a standard high-explosive ammunition at a maximum range of up to 40 km (25 mi) and has a capacity to carry 20 rounds and propellant charges on-board.

== Export ==
=== Armenia ===
An unidentified friendly foreign nation placed an export order with Kalyani Strategic Systems on 9 November 2022, for the production of 155 mm artillery gun platforms within three years. The deal is for $155.5 million.

The MArG 39 is the first mounted gun system from India to be sold abroad. On 7 February 2026, the Ministry of Defence of Armenia publicly unveiled the weapon, which is acquired through agreements with the Indian defense sector. The new weapon system enables digital integration with the domestically produced command and control (C2) infrastructure of the Armenian Armed Forces.

=== United States ===
AM General plans to participate in the Mobile Tactical Cannon (MTC) programme of the U.S. Army. They have collaborated with Kalyani Strategic Systems to offer the Mounted Artillery Gun MArG-52.

By February 2025, KSSL and AM General signed a letter of intent for the supply of artillery cannons to support the latter's development of a range of 105 mm and 155 mm calibre next-generation artillery guns. On 18 June 2026, they signed a strategic partnership the Eurosatory defense exposition. The MArG-52 platform is claimed to be combat-relevant and a delivery is planned by 2027 once chosen.

However, in August 2026, the U.S. Army announced the selection of Hanwha Defense USA to supply six prototypes of the 155mm K9 Mobile Howitzer, a wheeled variant based on K9 Thunder, for further trials with an option contract for additional 12 prototypes.

== Operators ==
Armenia

- Armenian Ground Forces – 72 guns shipped to Armenia by January 2026.

=== Failed bids ===
United States

- United States Army – MArG-52 was offered under the Mobile Tactical Cannon (MTC) programme along with AM General. However, a K9 Thunder-based wheeled variant was chosen for prototype testing in August 2026.

== See also ==
- K9 Thunder - South Korea
- ATMOS 2000 - Israel
- CAESAR self-propelled howitzer - France
