= Bharat Forge =

Indian multinational forging company

Bharat Forge Limited

- Bharat Forge headquarters in Pune
- Type: Public
- Traded as: BSE: 500493; NSE: BHARATFORG
- ISIN: INE465A01025
- Industry: Forging; Metals; Automotive; Defence; Energy
- Founded: 19 June 1961; 65 years ago in Mumbai
- Founder: Nilkanthrao A. Kalyani
- Headquarters: Pune Cantonment, Pune, Maharashtra, India
- Area served: Worldwide
- Key people: Baba Kalyani (Chairman)
- Products: Front axle assembly & components, general engineering equipment, hydraulic & mechanical presses, bandsaw machines for cutting metallic rounds, couplings and material handling equipment;
- Production output: 163,198 Mt (2021)
- Revenue: ▲₹15,122 crore (US$1.6 billion) (2025)
- Operating income: ▲₹2,757 crore (US$290 million) (2025)
- Net income: ▲₹1,645 crore (US$170 million) (2025)
- Owner: Kalyani Group (44.76%)
- Number of employees: 3,970 (2025)
- Subsidiaries: Bharat Forge Kilsta; Bharat Forge CDP; BF Aluminiumtechnik; Kalyani Strategic Systems; Sharp India (60%)
- Website: bharatforge.com
- Footnotes; Financials as of 31 March 2025.

Bharat Forge Limited is an Indian multinational company involved in forging, automotives, energy, construction, mining, railways, marine, aerospace and defence industries.

== History ==
The company was founded by Nilkanthrao A. Kalyani on 19 June 1961. Headquartered in Pune, Maharashtra, it is the flagship company of the Kalyani Group. Bharat Forge's Special Economic Zone (SEZ) named Khed City is spread over an area of 1,000 hectares (4200 acres) in Khed taluka, and is the largest SEZ in Pune district. It was the first company promoted by the Kalyani Group and remains the Group's flagship company. The current chairman of the company is the founder's son, Babasaheb Kalyani.

Bharat Forge's products include front axle beams, steering knuckles, connecting rods and crankshafts. The new strategy is to augment a strong global footprint in Lightweight materials. As part of its risk mitigation efforts, Bharat Forge diversified into a variety of industrial sectors including oil & gas, infrastructure, and marine. Some of BFL's largest customers include Daimler Group, VW Group, Meritor and Dana etc. The company also has an extensive collaboration with major truck manufacturers.

Bharat Forge's Investment and Windmills divisions were demerged to a new company named BF Utilities Limited on 15 September 2000.

In October 2024, Bharat Forge acquired AAM India Manufacturing (AAMIMCPL), a subsidiary of American Axle & Manufacturing Holdings, for ₹544.5 crore.

=== Manufacturing ===
Currently Bharat Forge is the "world’s largest single location forging facility consisting of fully automated forging press lines and state-of-the-art machining facility." It has manufacturing operations in four locations:

- Mundhwa: forging and machining facility spread across 100 acres;
- Satara: general engineering division;
- Baramati: forging and machining facility, known for its ring rolling presses;
- Chakan: machining facility;

== Subsidiaries ==
Bharat Forge Kilsta (Sweden), Bharat Forge CDP (Germany), and BF Aluminiumtechnik are the company's Europe-based forging units. Other subsidiaries of Bharat Forge include:

=== Kalyani Strategic Systems ===
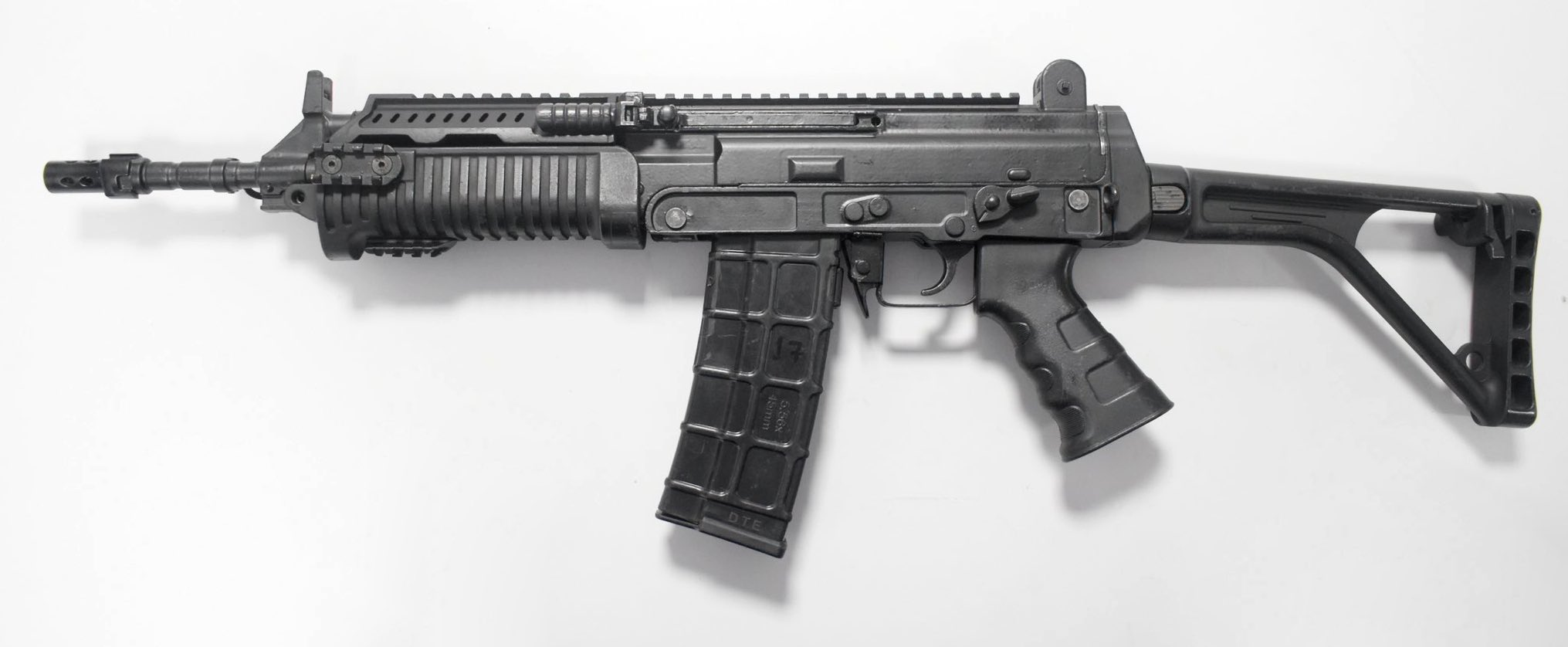
DRDO Close Quarter Battle (CQB) Carbine, manufactured by KSSL

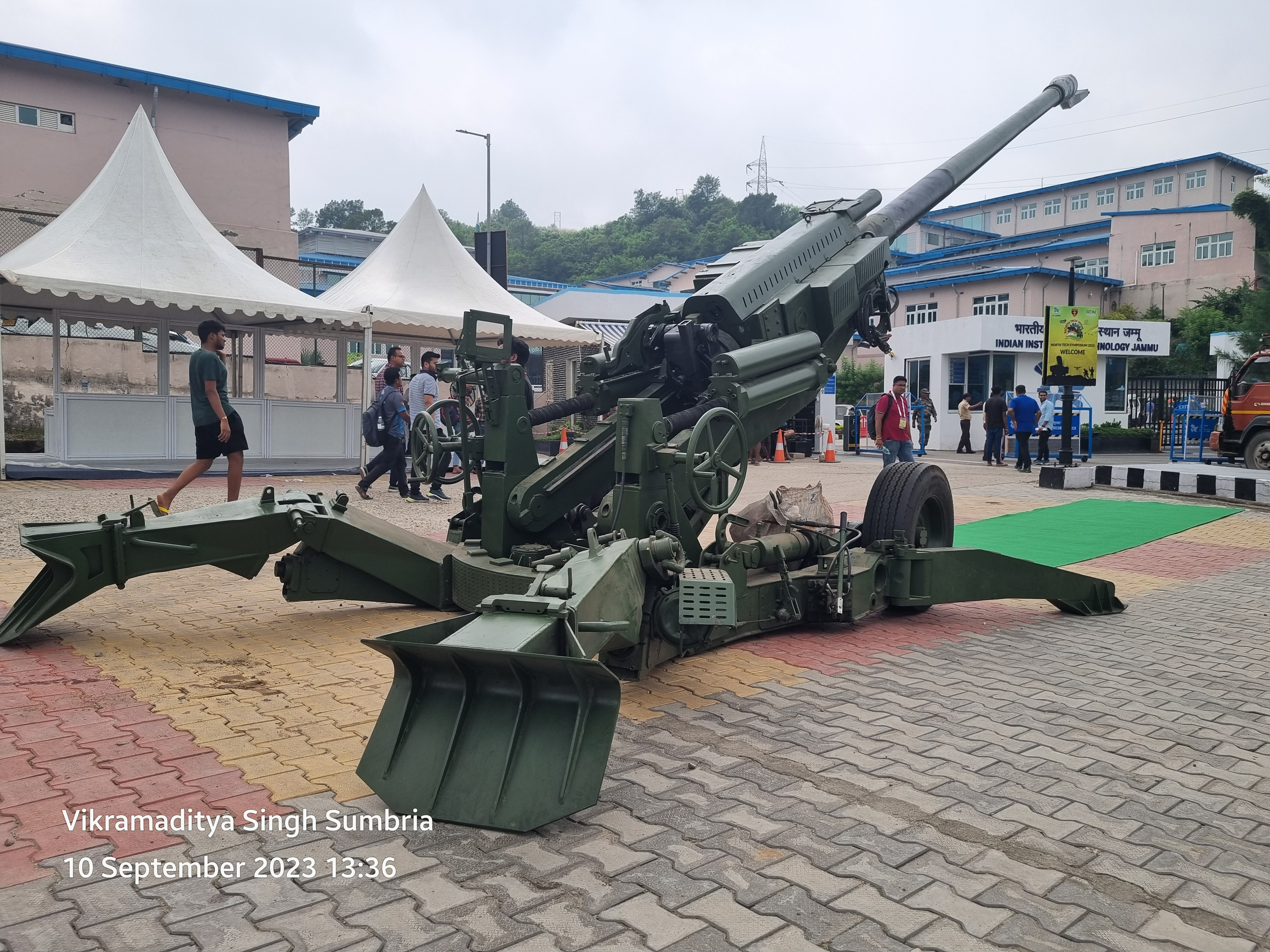
Kalyani Bharat ULH 155mm 39 CAL Howitzer at an exhibition at IIT Jammu, Jammu & Kashmir.

Kalyani Strategic Systems Limited (KSSL) is a defence manufacturer that supplies components and subsystems to the Indian Armed Forces, and exports to other countries. The company holds an Industrial License under the Arms Act, 1959. In May 2021, Bharat Forge announced that it would raise its stake in KSSL from 51% to 100%. It provides a range of products including artillery systems, Protected Vehicles, armored vehicle upgrades, ammunition, missiles, and air defense solutions.

According to reports that emerged on 14 May 2024, Bharat Forge is developing an Infantry Combat Vehicle under Indian Army's futuristic infantry combat vehicles (FICV) programme on par with DRDO Abhay IFV. Bharat Forge is also developing a Light Tank under 25 tonnes to compete L&T's Zorawar tank in the Army's light tank programme.

The Indian Army will receive 255,128 CQB carbines from KSSL for around ₹1,700 crore (US$180 million) under a contract signed in 30 December 2025.

In January 2026, the company received an emergency procurement (EP-VI) contract worth ₹300 crore (US$31 million) from the Indian Army for ISR drone platforms and loitering munitions with end use expected with Navy. The drone platforms include Omega One, Omega Nine, Bayonet, and Cleaver. The Omega One was also showcased onboard a BMP-2 infantry combat vehicle during the Army Day parade.

Kalyani Strategic Systems and Thales Group signed a Strategic Alliance Agreement on 3 September 2026, to establish industrial capacity for the co-production of 70 mm rockets in India. The rockets are currently manufactured in the Belgian unit of Thales and the agreement was signed during the official visit of Belgian Prime Minister to India. Thales will offer its experience in 70-mm rockets and launchers built in Belgium, while KSSL will use its local manufacturing and testing capabilities to support the fabrication and integration of components from Thales' qualified supply chain. The upcoming Energetics facility of KSSL in Andhra Pradesh will also be part of the project. The first rocket fully assembled in India is expected to be delivered by early 2027. Along with the FZ275 laser-guided rockets, the agreement also covers the FZ90 unguided Folding Fin Aircraft Rocket (FFAR).

==== Kalyani Rafael Advanced Systems ====
Kalyani Rafael Advanced Systems (KRAS) is joint venture between KSSL and Israeli defence company Rafael Advanced Defense Systems established in 2015. KSSL holds a 51% stake, while Rafael holds the remaining 49%. The Kalyani Group claimed that it was the first private sector advanced defence subsystems manufacturing company in India. KRAS manufactures electro-optics, remote weapon systems, precision guided munitions and system engineering for system integration. KRAS established a 24,000 sq ft defence manufacturing facility in Hyderabad, Telangana in August 2017.

The first product planned to be produced at the facility was the Israeli Spike anti-tank guided missiles (ATGM). However, the Government of India assigned the ATGM programme to the Defence Research and Development Organisation, after which KRAS pivoted to producing Spice 2000 bombs.

In July 2019, KRAS received a $100 million contract to produce 1,000 Barak 8 medium-range surface-to-air missiles (MR-SAM) for the Indian Army and Air Force. On 16 March 2021, KRAS announced that it had begun delivery of the first batch of MR-SAMs. This was the second product built at the Hyderabad plant.

==== Zorya Mashproekt ====
Kalyani Strategic Systems bought a 51% share in Zorya Mashproekt India Private Limited, the Indian subsidiary of Zorya Mashproekt. On 9 May 2023, the company signed the acquisition agreement. The acquisition process was finished on 31 December 2023. The Indian Navy has consulted Bharat Forge to develop and supply marine gas turbine engines given the Russo-Ukrainian War that has impacted Zorya-Mashproekt, the primary supplier. Bharat Forge bought a 51% share in Zorya Mashproekt India Private Limited. On 9 May 2023, Kalyani Strategic Systems signed the acquisition agreement. The acquisition process was finished on 31 December 2023.

Bharat Forge received a contract from the Indian Ministry of Defence on 19 June 2026 to supply 12 sets of 1.25 MW (1,680 hp) Marine Gas Turbine Generators for the Indian Navy at the cost of ₹425 crore (US$44 million).

==== Artillery business ====
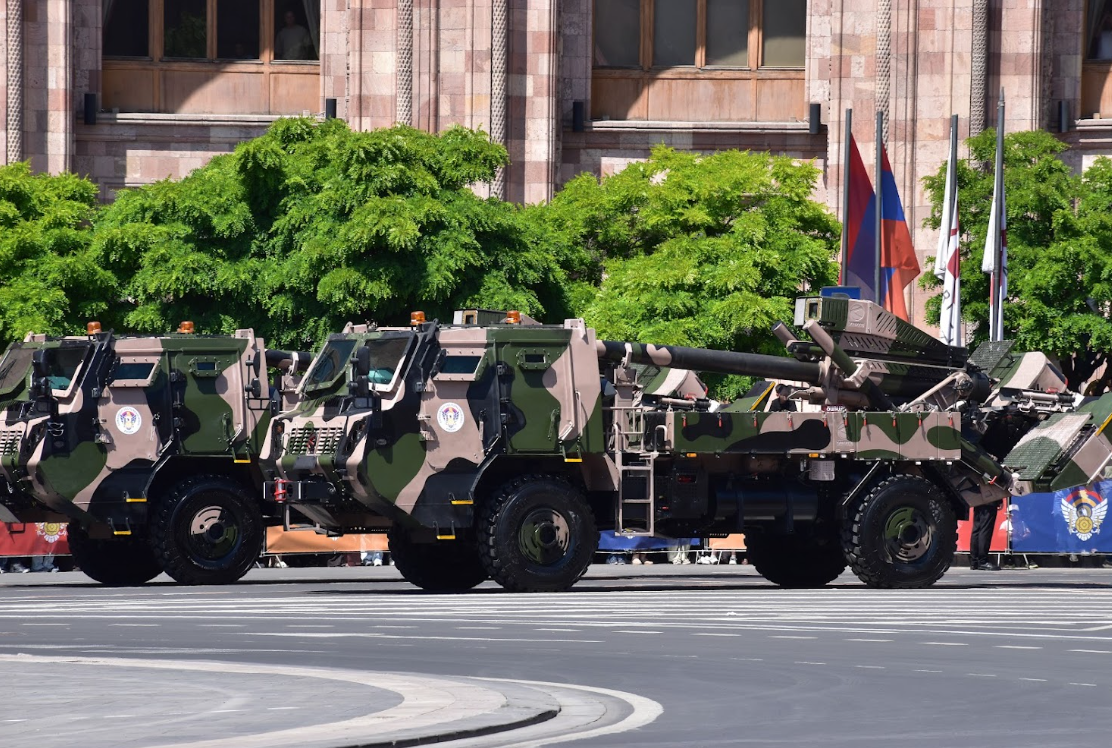
The MArG-39 in service with the Armenian Ground Forces

In 2024, KSSL reported a record export of 100 artillery guns to foreign customers, including Armenia and an unnamed Middle Eastern country as part of a $155 million contract for 155 mm guns in 2022. The products that were exported includes towed guns, such as the Bharat-52 and the Advanced Towed Artillery Gun System (ATAGS) along with the mounted MArG 155-BR system and ultra-light howitzers. As of February 2025, the subsidiary has an order book of $600 million. KSSL also signed a letter of intent with AM General for the supply of artillery cannons to support the latter's development of a range of 105 mm and 155 mm calibre next-generation artillery guns.

On 18 June 2026, KSSL signed a strategic partnership with AM General at the Eurosatory defense exposition. The objective of the partnership was to offer compact and light-weight next generation mounted artillery gun platforms for the global market. AM General has offered to participate in the Mobile Tactical Cannon (MTC) programme of the U.S. Army where they offered a 155 mm, 52-calibre platform based on the Mounted Artillery Gun (MArG) system of the KSSL. The platform is claimed to be combat-relevant and a delivery is planned by 2027 once chosen. The system will be integrated with the patented Soft Recoil Technology (SRT) Recoil Mitigation system, an automated load-assist, and an all-weather fire-control suite providing indirect and direct fire capabilities. It fires a standard high-explosive ammunition at a maximum range of up to 40 km (25 mi) and has a capacity to carry 20 rounds and propellant charges on-board.

=== Sharp India ===
Kalyani Telecommunications & Electronics Pvt. Ltd. was incorporated on 5 July 1985 by Bharat Forge. The company manufactured black and white and colour television sets, and videocassette recorders under the brand name Optonica. It became a public limited company on 20 September 1985. The company was renamed Kalyani Sharp India Ltd. on 2 May 1986. Japan's Sharp Corporation acquired a 40% stake in Kalyani Sharp India Ltd. in 1990. The company was renamed Sharp India Ltd. in 2005.

=== BF Elbit Advanced Systems ===
In order to meet the needs of the Ministry of Defense and other prospective Indian government clients for artillery and mortar systems, Bharat Forge and Elbit Systems Land and C4I Limited announced a strategic partnership in August 2012 through the creation of a new joint venture company. The request by Bharat Forge to sell Elbit Systems Land and C41 Limited a 26% ownership part in its defense business was accepted by the Foreign Investment Promotion Board in 2013. 74% of BF Elbit Advanced Systems would still be owned by Bharat Forge.

=== Former subsidiaries ===
==== Alstom Bharat Forge Power ====
Alstom Bharat Forge Power Limited was a joint venture with French company Alstom. Originally, Alstom held a 51% stake and Bharat Forge held the remaining 49%. Alstom's shares were acquired by American conglomerate General Electric on 25 November 2015 as part of its global acquisition of Alstom's energy business. Alstom Bharat Forge won a contract to supply two units of 660 MW supercritical coal turbines to NTPC Limited for a power plant in Solapur, Maharashtra. Alstom Bharat Forge began production of supercritical turbines and generators at a new manufacturing facility at Sanand, Gujarat in May 2016. The company won a contract to supply two units of 800 MW ultra-supercritical steam turbine generator islands for the Telangana Super Thermal Power Project Phase-1 near Ramagundam. On 8 November 2016, the board of Bharat Forge approved the exit of the company from Alstom Bharat Forge Power. In March 2017, Bharat Forge announced that it would divest 23% of its shares to GE, and the remaining 26% stake was divested in February 2018 completing Bharat Forge's exit from Alstom Bharat Forge Power.

== Products ==
=== Defence ===
- Bharat-52
- ATAGS
- DRDO Close Quarter Battle carbine
- Omega One ISR drone platform
- Omega Nine ISR drone platform
- Bayonet loitering munition
- Cleaver loitering munition
