= DRDO Close Quarter Battle carbine =

Indian carbine derived from the INSAS family

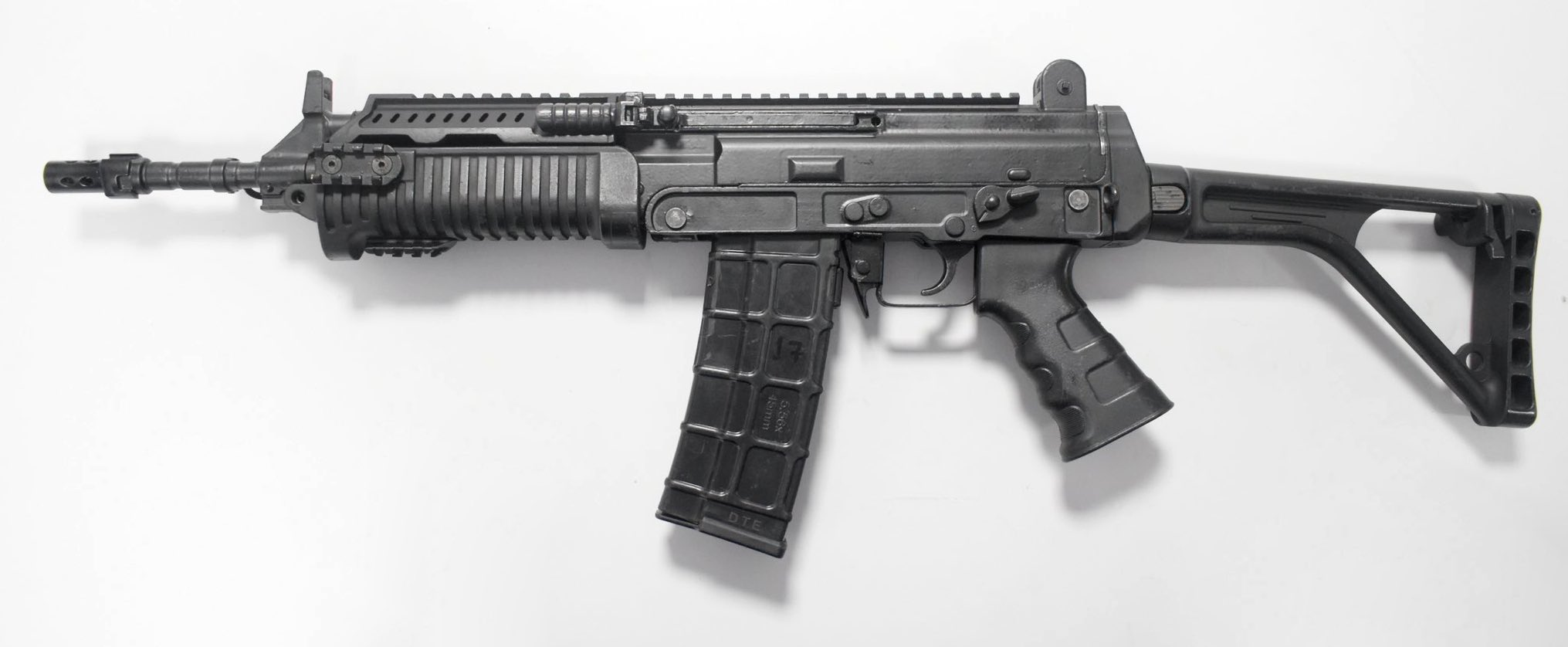
- DRDO Close Quarter Battler carbine
- Type: Carbine
- Place of origin: India

Service history
- Used by: Indian Army; Indian Navy

Production history
- Designer: Armament Research and Development Establishment (DRDO)
- Designed: late 2010s–2020s
- Manufacturer: Bharat Forge
- Produced: 2026–present
- No. built: 255,128 (planned)

Specifications
- Mass: 3.3 kg (7.3 lb)
- Cartridge: 5.56×45mm NATO & INSAS
- Rate of fire: >600 rounds/min
- Effective firing range: 200m
- Feed system: 30-round detachable box magazine
- Sights: In-built iron sights, mount point for telescopic or night sight

The DRDO Close Quarter Battle carbine is a carbine developed in India by the Armament Research and Development Establishment (ARDE) and manufactured by the Kalyani Strategic Systems Limited (KSSL) of Bharat Forge as per the carbine requirements of the Indian Armed Forces.

== History ==
The Indian Armed Forces have had a long history when it failed to find a replacement of its in-service SAF Carbine 1A1/2A1 models which had been license manufactured by the Ordnance Factory Board (OFB) since 1963 and 1977, respectively. The first attempt to acquire a carbine was made in 2008 when both Defence Research and Development Organisation and OFB failed to meet the Indian Army's requirements. Simultaneously, the Indian Navy also cleared a carbine procurement programme in 2008 with a tender issued in 2010. However, the procurement remained inclomplete.

This was followed by a global tender was launched in 2011 for a requirement for the acquisition of 44,618 CQB carbines. Four companies — Israel's IWI, Italian Beretta, and American firms Colt and Sig Sauer — had responded to the tender. However, only IWI, presenting its IWI Galil ACE carbine, could qualify while rest of the participants failed at the night vision mounting system criteria. The Ministry again cancelled the tender due to single vendor situation.

Another global request for information (RFI) was launched in 2017. The pre-tender documents issued a requirement for around 2 lakh carbines while the Ministry of Defence (MoD) cleared a Fast Track Procurement (FTP) for 93,895 carbines in 2018. An estimation of an overall requirement of 5 lakh carbines was estimated. In September 2018, Caracal was selected as the lowest bidder against Thales Australia under the FTP. Further contract negotiations was expected for over three months while the deliveries were to be completed within a year following the signing of the contract. However, the contract for CAR 816 was formally cancelled in September 2020 due to overpricing concerns and as the DRDO and the Indian industry wanted to take part in such a tender.

On 23 September 2022, the defence ministry issued a new request for information (RFI) to procure 5.56×45mm NATO-compatible Close Quarter Battle (CQB) Carbines for the Indian Army and the Indian Navy. On 29 November 2022, the ministry released Request for Proposal (RfP) for the procurement after the Acceptance of Necessity (AoN) was received from the Defence Acquisition Council (DAC). The requirement was for 425,213 carbines (418,455 for the Army and 6,758 for the Navy). The order would be split between the two of the lowest bidders, with the lowest bidder securing L1 delivering 255,128 units and second lowest bidder L2 delivering 170,085 units. The carbine must weigh within the range of 3-3.5 kg and must have a range of more than 200 m and a cyclic rate of firing 600 rounds/min. The procurement was under Buy 'Indian' category which mandates the design to have over 60% indigenous content.

As of June 2024, 15 vendors were competing for the contract and summer trials of the products were underway with winter trials expected later the same year. In June 2025, the DRDO-Bharat Forge's Close Quarter Battle (CQB) Carbine had emerged as the lowest bidder for the tender. The carbines would be manufactured by Kalyani Strategic Systems Limited (KSSL) in its Khed City or Jejuri facility, both near Pune. Meanwhile, Adani Defence became the L2 bidder and is expected to deliver its Adani Jeet, a derivative of IWI Galil ACE-N 21 design, from its Gwalior facility through its subsidiary PLR Systems. The contracts would be worth ₹1,700 crore (US$180 million) and ₹1,100 crore (US$120 million), respectively.

The contracts, with a combined worth of ₹2,770 crore (US$290 million), was signed on 30 December 2025.

== Design ==
The gun has an effective range of 200 m (660 ft), weight of 3.3 kg (7.3 lb) and supports a 30-round magazine compatible with both NATO-standard and INSAS ammunition.

== Operators ==
=== Future ===
India

- Indian Army: On order.
- Indian Navy: On order.

== See also ==
- INSAS rifle
- AK-203
- SIG 716i
- Adani Jeet
