= The Transportation Alliance =

The Transportation Alliance (TTA) is a non-profit trade association of and for the private passenger transportation industry which includes taxicabs, executive sedan and limousine services, airport shuttle fleets, non-emergency medical transportation companies, and paratransit services. It is based in Silver Spring, Maryland.

Formed in 1917 as the National Association of Taxicab Owners (NATO), the organization has evolved with the changes in the transportation industry, merging with the American Taxicab Association (ATA) in 1966 to become the International Taxicab Association (ITA), and changing their name to the Taxicab, Limousine & Paratransit Association (TLPA) in 2000, and finally adopting its current name, The Transportation Alliance in 2019, representing the interests of members in 250 cities on four continents. The Transportation Alliance is the largest trade organization in the industry, with members operating over 100,000 vehicles and serving 900 million passengers per year.

TTA and Uber and other transit tech companies have a "publicly contentious relationship". TTA launched "Who's Driving You," a campaign to expose the regulatory issues the association believes Uber, Lyft, and other transit mobile apps are violating."
