= Strategic partnership =

Type of business partnership

A strategic partnership (also see strategic alliance) is a relationship between two commercial enterprises, usually formalized by one or more business contracts. A strategic partnership will usually fall short of a legal partnership entity, agency, or corporate affiliate relationship. Strategic partnerships can take on various forms from shake hand agreements, contractual cooperation's all the way to equity alliances, either the formation of a joint venture or cross-holdings in each other.

== Overview ==
Typically, two companies form a strategic partnership when each possesses one or more business assets or have expertise that will help the other by enhancing their businesses. This can also mean, that one firm is helping the other firm to expand their market to other marketplaces, by helping with some expertise. According to Cohen and Levinthal a considerable in-house expertise which complements the technology activities of its partner is a necessary condition for a successful exploitation of knowledge and technological capabilities outside their boundaries. Strategic partnerships can develop in outsourcing relationships where the parties desire to achieve long-term “win-win” benefits and innovation based on mutually desired outcomes.

No matter if a business contract was signed, between the two parties, or not, a trust-based relationship between the partners is indispensable.

== Types of strategic partnerships ==
=== Product development ===
One common strategic partnership involves one company providing engineering, manufacturing or product development services, partnering with a smaller, entrepreneurial firm or inventor to create a specialized new product. Typically, the larger firm supplies capital, and the necessary product development, marketing, manufacturing, and distribution capabilities, while the smaller firm supplies specialized technical or creative expertise.

=== Suppliers and distributors ===
Another common strategic partnership involves a manufacturer/supplier partnering with a distributor or wholesale consumer. Rather than approach the transactions between the companies as a simple link in the product or service supply chain, the two companies form a closer relationship where they mutually participate in advertising, marketing, branding, product development, and other business functions. As examples, an automotive manufacturer may form strategic partnerships with its parts suppliers, or a music distributor with record labels.

The activities of a strategic partnership can also include a shared research & development department between the partners. This requires a higher level of knowledge sharing as well as a higher level of sharing the technological capabilities. But by doing so, the costs and risks of innovation can be spread between the partners.

=== Business outsourcing ===
Strategic partnerships also have emerged to solve many company business problems. The book Vested: How P&G, McDonald’s and Microsoft are Redefining Winning in Business Relationships profiles strategic partnerships in large scale business process outsourcing relationships, public-private infrastructure projects, facilities management and supply chain relationships. Contemporary strategic sourcing and procurement processes enable organizations to use performance-based or vested sourcing business models for establishing strategic supplier relationships.

== Advantages and disadvantages ==
There can be many advantages to creating strategic partnerships. As Robert M. Grant states in his book Contemporary Strategy Analysis, "For complete strategies, as opposed to individual projects, creating option value means positioning the firm such that a wide array of opportunities become available". Firms taking advantage of strategic partnerships can utilize other company's strengths to make both firms stronger in the long run.

Strategic partnerships raise questions concerning co-inventorship and other intellectual property ownership, technology transfer, exclusivity, competition, hiring away of employees, rights to business opportunities created in the course of the partnership, splitting of profits and expenses, duration and termination of the relationship, and many other business issues. Another risk of strategic partnerships, especially between manufacturer and key supplier, is the potential forward integration by the key supplier. Also different developments or development plans can lead to a broken strategic partnership. The relationships are often complex as a result, and can be subject to extensive negotiation. Strategic partnerships are also prone to conflict. The University of Tennessee has done significant research into strategic partnerships, especially in the area of strategic outsourcing relationships.

== See also ==
- Strategic alliance
