= IMETS =

Military technology

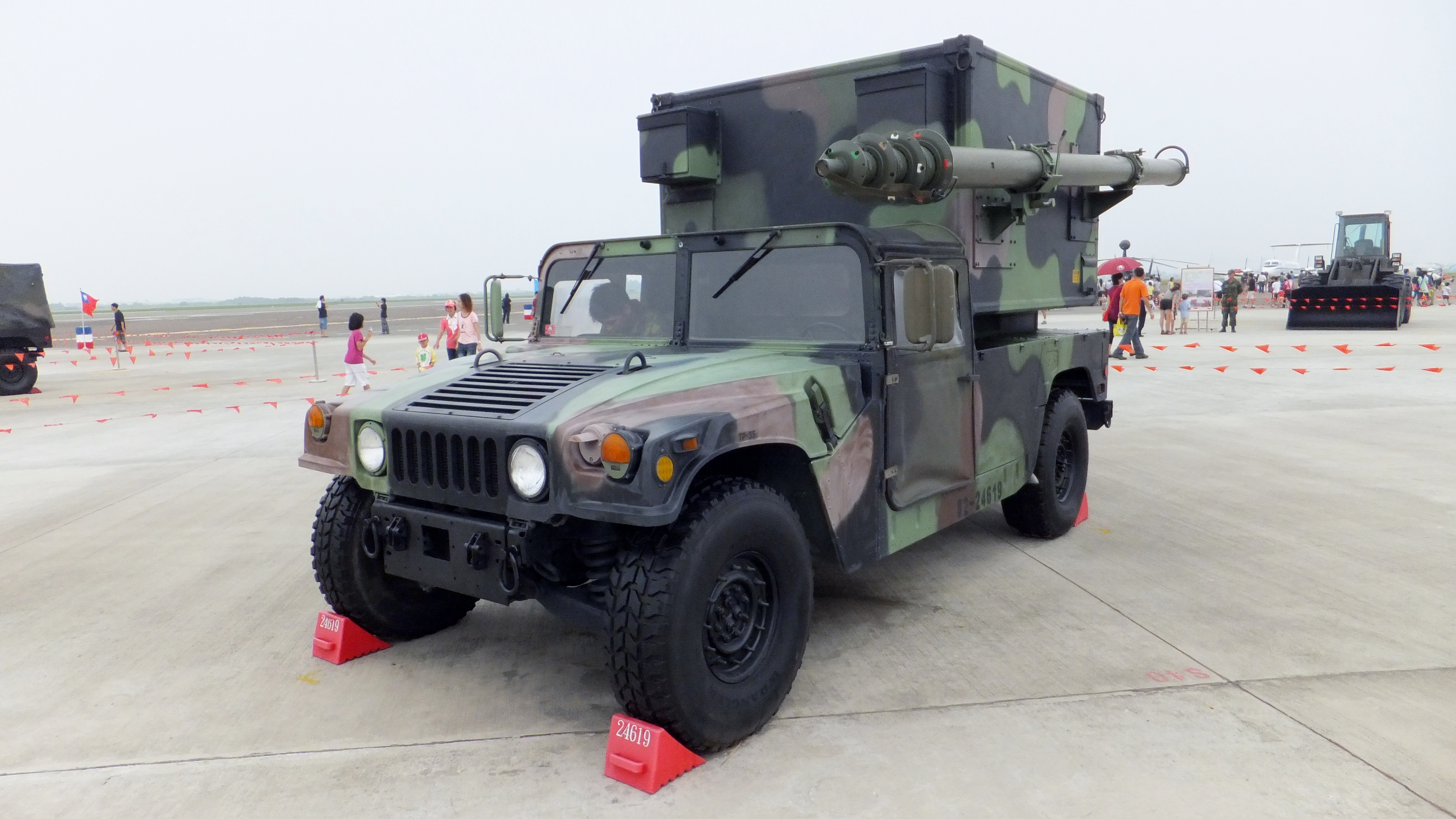
ROC IMETS

Integrated Meteorological System (AN/TMQ-40 IMETS), developed by Northrop Grumman is the meteorological component of the Intelligence and Electronic Warfare (IEW), an element of the Army Battle Command System (ABCS). IMETS provides Army commanders at all echelons with an automated weather system to receive, process, and disseminate weather observations, forecasts, and weather and environmental effects decision aids to all Battlefield Operating Systems (BOS). IMETS is designed to be a mobile, tactical, automated weather data receiving, processing and dissemination system. The IMETS is an Army-furnished and maintained system operated by US Air Force battlefield weather team personnel. It uses US Air Force and Army developed software to provide a total weather system to support the Army. The Integrated Weather Effects Decision Aid (IWEDA) software, originally developed by the U.S. Army Research Laboratory (ARL) in 1992, has been fielded on IMETS since 1997 to provide tactical weather support to the U.S. Army.

IMETS is a heavy Humvee mounted tactical system which provides automation and communications support to staff weather teams assigned to echelons from brigade through Echelons Above Corps (EAC). IMETS receives weather information from polar-orbiting civilian and defense meteorological satellites, Air Force Global Weather Center, artillery meteorological teams, remote sensors and civilian forecast centers. IMETS processes and collates forecasts, observations, and climatological data to produce timely and accurate weather products tailored to the specific Warfighter's needs.

IMETS provides automation and communications support to USAF Weather Teams assigned to Army G2/G3 sections at echelons Brigade through EAC. IMETS receives, processes, and collates forecasts, observations, and climatological data to produce weather forecasts and timely and accurate products to meet Commanders' requirements. IMETS produces displays and disseminates, over Army ABCS, weather forecasts and tactical decision aids that compare the impact of current, projected, or hypothesized weather conditions on friendly and enemy capabilities.

== Variations ==
The IMETS currently fielded is in two configurations. They are the vehicle-mounted configuration (VMC), IMETS-Heavy, and the laptop version, the IMETS-Light. The IMETS-Light is the most common version; US Army uses IMETS-Light for aviation brigades and brigade combat teams. Both configurations have identical intelligence processing capabilities. The IMETS-Light has recently passed the Milestone C review and its production and fielding have official authorization. Both configurations of IMETS operate with ABCS Version 6.X-complaint software.

== Training ==
IMETS training is accomplished at Staff Weather Officer (SWO) Course at Fort Huachuca, Arizona. SWO training is four weeks long, IMETS portion being half of that. This is somewhat ironic, as IMETS has not been used much since the wars in Afghanistan and Iraq began.

== Units with IMETS ==
The following units use IMETS:

- 1st Cavalry, Fort Cavazos, Texas
- III Corps, Fort Cavazos, Texas
- 101 Air Assault Division, Fort Campbell, Kentucky
- 3rd Infantry Division, Fort Stewart, Georgia
- 10th Mountain Division, Fort Drum, New York
- I Corps, Fort Lewis, Washington
- 25th Infantry Division, Fort Shafter, Hawaii
- 3rd Armored Cavalry Regiment, Fort Bliss, Texas
- 1st MEB, Fort Polk, Louisiana
- 11th Armored Cavalry Regiment, Fort Irwin, California
- ARCENT, Fort McPherson, Georgia
- 6th Infantry BDE, Fort Richardson, Alaska
- 17th Aviation BDE, Yongsan, Republic of Korea
- V Corps Aviation BDE, Frankfurt, Germany
- 101st Aviation BDE, Fort Campbell, Kentucky
- 2nd Infantry Division, Camp Red Cloud, Republic of Korea

== My Weather Impacts Decision Aid ==
As of 2018, My Weather Impacts Decision Aid (MyWIDA), a decision-support software, was developed by the U.S. Army Research Laboratory (ARL). Designed to improve compatibility of technology with environmental factors through weather forecasting, MyWIDA is an updated version of the Integrated Weather Effects Decision Aid (IWEDA), which the Army fielded in 1995.

MyWIDA uses weather forecast data to evaluate environmental impacts on military technology, aiding decision-makers in selecting appropriate technological tools under forecasted weather events. An example is surface winds greater than 25 knots, which prohibit launching of unmanned aerial vehicles (UAVs) in a military scenario. The user would be alerted of this physical limitation through the MyWIDA software.

The system includes red-amber-green ratings (unfavorable-marginal-favorable), which account for a combination of weather parameters that affect a system or technology. These ratings determine limits beyond which it is not feasible for the technology function due to safety considerations, decreased system effectiveness or violation of manufacturer's operating limits.

MyWida was preceded by Integrated Weather Effects Decision Aid (IWEDA), an automated software decision aid developed by ARL in 1992.

IWEDA was fielded on the Integrated Meteorological System (IMETS) in 1997 to provide tactical weather support to the U.S. IWEDA software was certified and accredited for the Army in 2006. As of 2011, the web-based MYWIDA was under development for eventual replacement of IWEDA.

IWEDA was designed to address the adverse effects of the environment and climate (i.e. wind, precipitation, storms and temperature) on military operations and weapon systems. IWEDA produced a graphic display of weather impacts on 70 weapon systems, including 16 threat systems. Impacts were displayed graphically on a user interface, called the Weather Effects Matrix (WEM), which color coded the impacts on the system of interest (i.e. green “favorable,” amber “marginal,” and red “unfavorable”). Although intended for the Army, applications were also integrated into the Air Force and Navy systems.

Over the years, observations have identified varying needs for IWEDA's improvement. These included (1) a need to derive complete mission impact due to poor weather conditions, rather than simply presenting a “worst-case scenario” for specific weapon systems; and (2) a need to improve representation of IWEDA's “stoplight” color scheme (green, yellow and red) by providing more color-coded values.
