= M1114 HMMWV Interim Fragment (Frag) Kit 5 =

Extra armour for light military vehicles

The M1114 HMMWV Interim Fragment (Frag) Kit 5 was an add-on armor for doors of the M1114 HMMWV. It consisted of four bolt-on doors that provided another layer of metal over the previously established factory-built armor, and was initially deployed in the field in April 2006. The doors provided another layer of metal over the previously established factory-built armor. This kit was designed and tested by the U.S. Army Research Laboratory at Aberdeen Proving Ground, MD.

The ballistic threats encountered at the time of development exceeded the design limits of the baseline M1114; therefore, the Frag 5 doors were developed. They provided additional protection from roadside bombs designed to pierce tank armor. The Frag 5 armor upgrade included four 600-pound doors with additional plating of homogeneous steel armor, battle-tested with the Marine Armor Kit on the HMMWV A2 series.

Frag Kit 5 helped slow the incoming projectile and contain some of the shrapnel, preventing the vehicle from becoming a secondary source of fragmentation during attacks. Another addition was the large “D-shaped” hooks welded to the Humvee doors to reduce the percentage of doors jamming shut during an attack and trapping the soldiers inside. Due to these changes, rescue teams could open blast-damaged doors by ripping them off with a cable attached to another truck; thereby saving the personnel inside.

The M1114 Humvee Interim Fragment Kit 5, received an award as one of the U.S. Army's Greatest Inventions in 2006.
