= Xiaolong Automotive Technologies Co., Ltd =

Chinese vehicle manufacturer

- Xiaolong Automotive Technologies Co., Ltd logo
- Company type: Public
- Industry: Automotive
- Headquarters: Changfu New City, Caidian, Wuhan, China, China
- Number of locations: two
- Area served: Worldwide
- Key people: President Zhou Chuiyuan, CEO Xiao Shuangxi
- Products: trucks and tactical vehicles
- Website: en.xiaolongauto.com

Xiaolong Automotive Technologies Co., Ltd, also known as Wulan Xiaolong Automotive Technologies Co., Ltd, is a Chinese tactical wheeled vehicle manufacturer based in Changfu New City, Caidian, Wuhan, China. Xiaolong Automobile started independent research and development in 1998 and established a facility in 2006 for research and development. Xiaolong Automobile has been exported to Africa, the Middle East, South America, Southeast Asia and other international markets in batches. Special industries such as domestic oil exploration, forest fire prevention, emergency rescue and disaster relief have also begun to use Xiaolong vehicles.

== Facilities ==
Xiaolong Motors has two locations, Wuhan, Hubei and Longyan, Fujian. The Wuhan base is mainly responsible for research and development and the production of some basic civilian vehicles. The Longyan base is mainly responsible for the production and manufacture of special vehicles for foreign trade export and special industries. The Wuhan facility already has an annual production capacity of 3,000 units, and the Longyan base has an annual production capacity of 5,000 units.

== Products ==
The following are listed on the company's product page:

- Caravan
- Medical Vehicle - truck based
- Fire Fighting & Rescue Vehicle
- Communication & Command Vehicle
- Engineering Rescue Vehicle
- Pipeline Maintenance Vehicle
- Electricity Rescue Vehicle
- Emergency Power Supply Vehicle
- Snow Removal Vehicle
- Mobile Office Vehicle
- Succor Vehicle - Emergency lighting vehicles
- XLW 2060L - a Hummer clone (see below)
- XL 2070
- XL 2070S
- XTW TB
- XLW 2090

== Humvee clones ==
Three Humvee clones are manufactured in Chine, the first two being the Dongfeng EQ2050 and the Shenyang Aircraft Corporation SFQ2040, the third is Xiaolong Automotive Technologies Co., Ltd produced XL2060L Fierce Dragon from Xiaolong Automotive Technologies Co., Ltd . XAT publicly rolled out the vehicles from its production lines in October 2008. Trials are being conducted by the PLA in remote areas such as Tibet, followed by tests in the deserts of Dubai.

== Notes ==
Xiaolong, pronounced “Shout Lone”, which means the Fierce Dragon

== See also ==
- Humvee clone manufacturing in China
