= Humvee clone manufacturing in China =

Industry

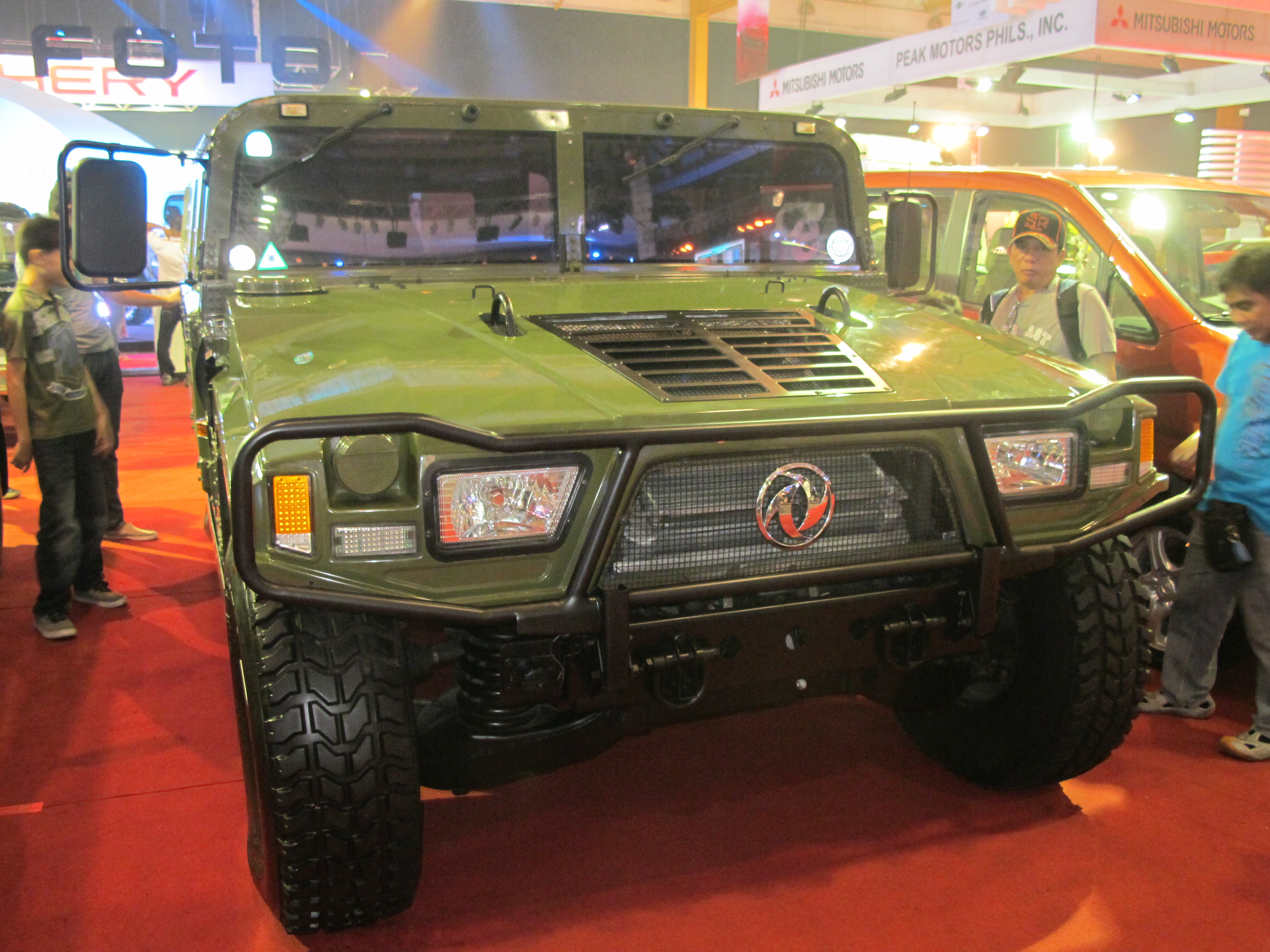
A Dongfeng (lit. "Eastwind") EQ2050 at the Manila International Auto Show 2013.

There are at least three Chinese automobile manufacturers building Humvee clones. One of these, the Dongfeng "Hanma" rely on imported U.S. made parts including Hummer H1 chassis and GM V8 6.5L diesel engines. Currently, these companies have the capability of making indigenous parts for these Humvee-like vehicles.

== Variants ==
=== Dongfeng EQ2050 ===
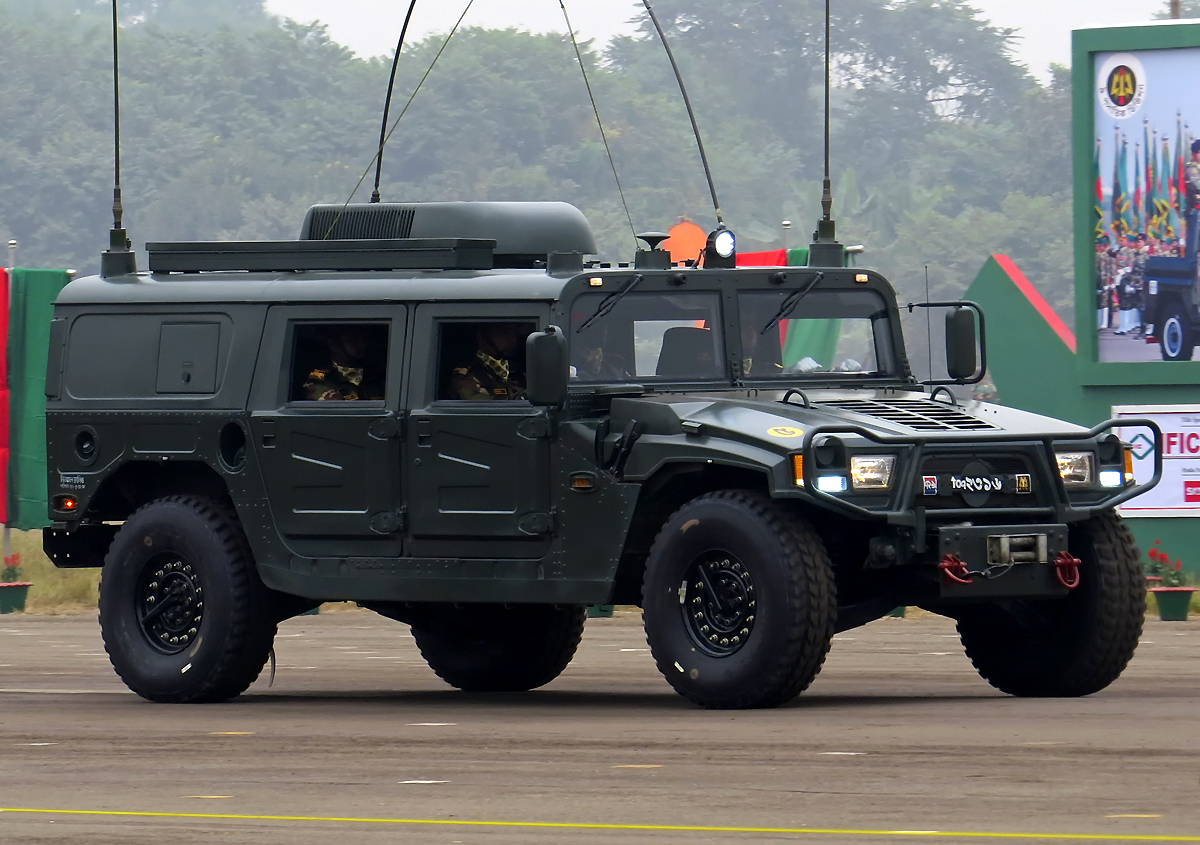
A Bangladeshi army Dongfeng EQ2050 in 2015

The Dongfeng EQ2050 (Note: Newer version known as Dongfeng Mengshi (东风猛士)) is a Chinese-made armored vehicle based on the Humvee, manufactured for government use by the Dongfeng Motor Group. It is known to be sold by the company for 700,000 Yuan ($93,000). The vehicle was created after People's Liberation Army (PLA) officials saw the Humvee deployed in the Gulf War. While it is used in the PLA, it has also been exported to friendly countries for military use. The EQ2050 is largely being replaced in its role by the newer Dongfeng Mengshi class of vehicles.

=== Shenyang Aircraft Corporation SFQ2040 ===
In 2002, Shenyang Aircraft Corporation (SAC) revealed its own Humvee clone known as Shenfei SFQ2040 LieYing (Falcon). The missile system, mounted on an SAC SFQ2040, is similar to the U.S. Army HMMWV-mounted Avenger air defense system. SAC also emphasizes the low cost of its SFQ2040 with the price being one-third of the U.S.-made Humvee due to the use of aluminum in its construction. A few working prototypes were made from 2002 to 2003. At least 38-40 vehicles were reported to be made.

Unlike the steel body EQ2050, the SAC SFQ2040 has an aluminum alloy body, making it much lighter than the former. It uses a Cummins 4BTAA-92 turbodiesel engine. SAC lost out to DFM, which resulted in an attempt to create a civilian version of the SFQ2040, but it never went into production. Both vehicles have limited armor protection against small caliber weapons. The vehicles can be fitted with additional equipment such as air conditioning, GPS, night vision equipment, vehicle-mounted radio, electric winch, and multipurpose weapon mount.

=== Xiaolong XL2060 ===
A third Humvee clone is the XL2060L Fierce Dragon from Xiaolong Automotive Technologies Co., Ltd. XAT publicly rolled out the vehicles from its production lines in October 2008. Trials were conducted by the PLA in remote areas such as Tibet, followed by tests in the deserts of Dubai.

The XL2060L was on display at the Second Beijing International Disaster Emergency Response technology and equipment exhibition.

The XL2060L was influenced by the Humvee and the Unimog. It uses a Steyr diesel engine and its cost ranges from US$87,000 - $146,000. Production is based from the Longyan Economic Development Zone High-tech Park in Longyan City. Mass production started in early 2012.

== See also ==
- Dongfeng Mengshi
