= Humvee =

Family of light military vehicles built by AM General

High Mobility Multipurpose Wheeled Vehicle (HMMWV)
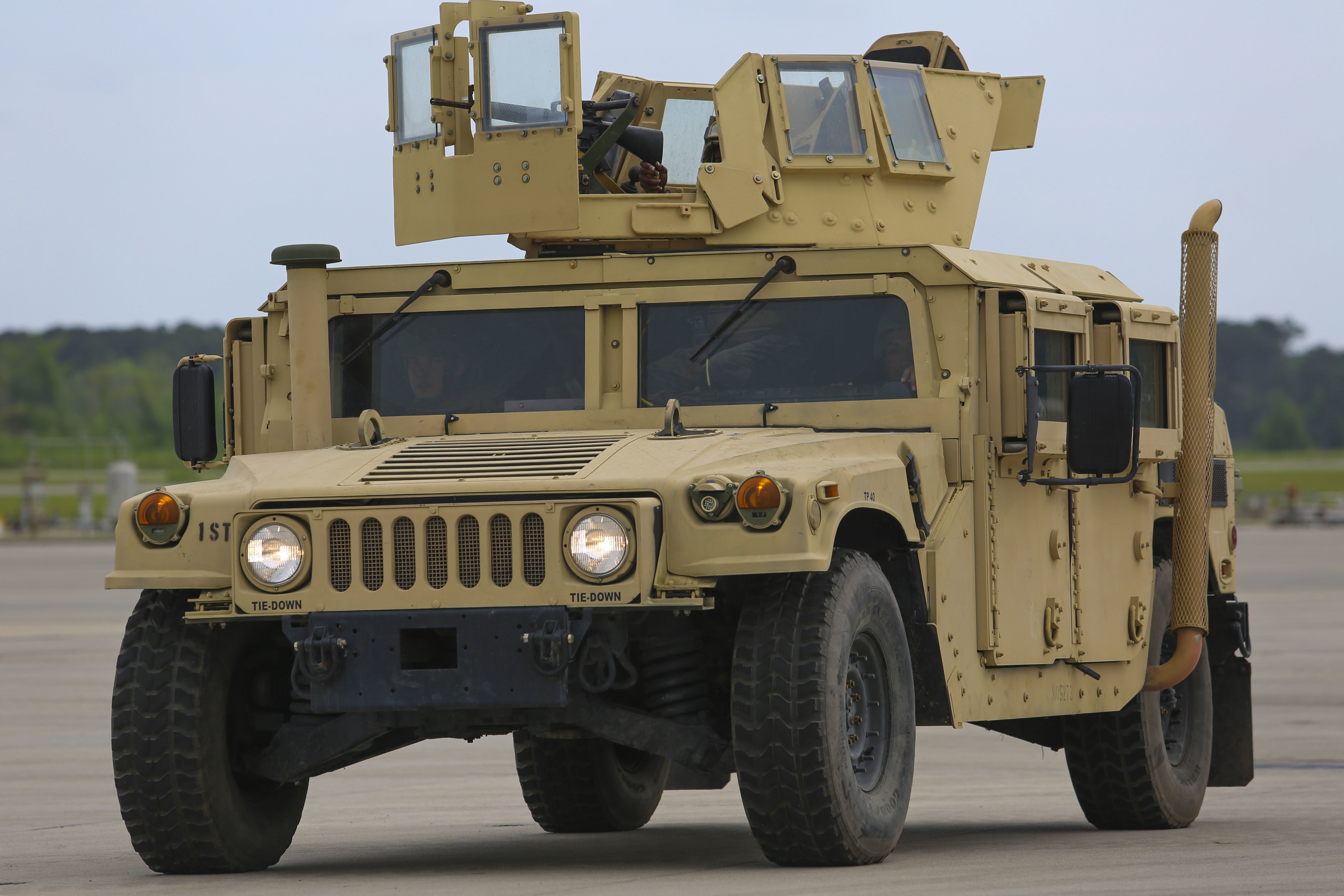
- M1151 Enhanced Armament Carrier
- Type: 2- or 4-door truck; Unarmored: Light utility vehicle; Armored: Infantry mobility vehicle
- Place of origin: United States

Service history
- In service: 1985–present
- Wars: Cold War; Invasion of Panama; Persian Gulf War; Somali Civil War; Operation Gothic Serpent; Battle of Mogadishu; Global War on Terrorism; 2001 insurgency in North Macedonia; Iraq War; War in Afghanistan; Syrian Civil War; Moro War; Zamboanga City crisis; War in Iraq; Yemeni Civil War; Saudi Arabian-led intervention in Yemen; Mexican drug war; Djiboutian-Eritrean border conflict; Arab–Israeli conflict; Russo-Ukrainian War; War in Donbas; Russian invasion of Ukraine; 2025 Cambodian–Thai clashes

Production history
- Manufacturer: AM General, assembled in Mishawaka, Indiana
- Unit cost: $220,000 (2011) (up-armored) (equivalent to $310,184 in 2025)
- Produced: 2 January 1985 – present
- No. built: 281,000

Specifications
- Mass: 5,200 to 5,900 lb (2,359 to 2,676 kg) curb weight, 7,700 to 8,500 lb (3,493 to 3,856 kg) gross weight
- Length: 15 ft (4.57 m), wheelbase 10 ft 10 in (3.30 m)
- Width: 7 ft 1 in (2.16 m)
- Height: 6 ft (1.83 m), reducible to 4 ft 6 in (1.37 m)
- Main armament: Multiple, see design features
- Engine: 6.2 L GM Detroit Diesel V8; 6.5 L GM Detroit Diesel V8; 6.5 L GEP Optimizer 6500 V8
- Transmission: GM TH400 / 3L80 3-speed automatic GM 4L80-E 4-speed automatic
- Suspension: Independent 4×4
- Fuel capacity: 25 U.S. gal (95 L)
- Operational range: 250–350 miles (400–560 km)
- Maximum speed: 55 mph (89 km/h) at max gross weight Over 70 mph (113 km/h) top speed

The High Mobility Multipurpose Wheeled Vehicle (HMMWV; colloquial: Humvee) is a family of light, four-wheel drive military trucks and utility vehicles produced by AM General. It has largely supplanted the roles previously performed by the original jeep, and others such as the Vietnam War-era M151 Jeep, the M561 "Gama Goat", their M718A1 and M792 ambulance versions, the Commercial Utility Cargo Vehicle, and other light trucks. Primarily used by the United States military, it is also used by numerous other countries and organizations and even in civilian adaptations.

The Humvee saw widespread use in the Gulf War of 1991, where it navigated the desert terrain; this usage helped to inspire civilian Hummer versions. The vehicle's original unarmored design was later seen to be inadequate and was found to be particularly vulnerable to improvised explosive devices in the Iraq War. The U.S. hastily up-armored select models and replaced frontline units with the MRAP. Under the Joint Light Tactical Vehicle (JLTV) program, in 2015 the U.S. Army selected the Oshkosh L-ATV to replace the vehicle in frontline U.S. military service.

== History ==
Since World War II, the "Willys MB 1/4-ton Truck, Command and Reconnaissance", and its evolutions, were used for mass-deployment, and became known as "jeeps". The United States military had continued to rely heavily on jeeps as general utility vehicles and as a mass-transport for soldiers in small groups. Although the U.S. Army had let Ford redesign the jeep from the ground up during the 1950s, and the resulting 1960 Ford M151 jeep incorporated significant innovations, it firmly adhered to the original concept: a very compact, light enough to manhandle, low profile vehicle, with a folding windshield, that a layman could barely distinguish from the preceding Willys jeeps. The jeeps were more than two feet shorter than a Volkswagen Beetle and weighed just over one metric ton, seating three to four, with an 800 lb (360 kg) off-road payload rating. During and after the war, the very light, 1/4-ton jeeps were complemented by the 3/4-ton Dodge WC and Korean War Dodge M37 models.

By the mid-1960s, the U.S. military felt a need to reevaluate their aging light vehicle fleet. From the mid-1960s, the U.S. Army had tried to modernize, through replacing the larger, purpose-built Dodge M37s by militarized, "commercial off the shelf" (COTS) 4×4 trucks—initially the M715 Jeep trucks, succeeded in the later 1970s by several "CUCV" adapted commercial pickup series, but these did not satisfy newer requirements either. What was wanted was a truly versatile light military truck, that could replace multiple outdated vehicles. When becoming aware of the U.S. Army's desire for a versatile new light weapons carrier/reconnaissance vehicle, as early as 1969 FMC Corporation started development on their XR311 prototype and offered it for testing in 1970. At least a dozen of these were built for testing under the High Mobility Combat Vehicle, or HMCV program, initially much more as an enhanced capability successor to the M151 jeep, than as a general-purpose vehicle.

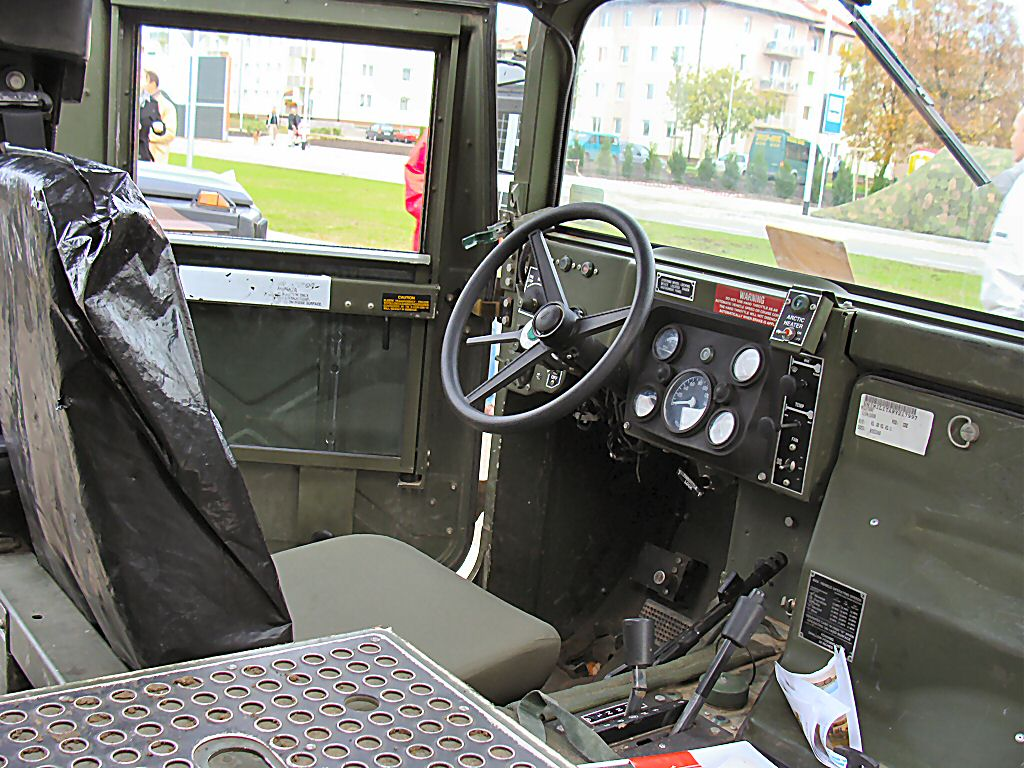
Humvee interior

The HMMWV program had its origins in the Combat Support Vehicle (CSV) program. The XM966 CSV was a proposed platform for the TOW missile launcher. Congress ended the program in 1977 due to the relatively small requirement of 3,800 vehicles. Adjusting to Congress's expectations, the Army increased the scale of the program, then called the XM966 High Mobility Weapons Carrier (CSVP), to replace multiple other trucks. Congress, interested in a larger joint services truck program, removed the CSVP from the 1979 budget. The Army restructured the program, which was then called High Mobility Multipurpose Wheeled Vehicle.

In 1979, the U.S. Army released draft specifications for the High Mobility Multipurpose Wheeled Vehicle (HMMWV), which was to replace all U.S. Army tactical vehicles in the 1/4-ton to 5/4-ton range, as well as select vehicles in the U.S. Marine Corps and U.S. Air Force. Namely these were the M151 quarter-ton jeeps, M561 Gama Goats, and the CUCVs, as one uniform "jack-of-all-trades" light tactical vehicle series, to better perform the roles of the impractically mixed fleet of outdated existing vehicles. The specifications called for a diesel engine, excellent on and off-road performance, the ability to carry a large payload, and improved survivability against indirect fire. Compared to the jeep, it was larger and had a much wider track, with a 16 in (410 mm) ground clearance, double that of most sport-utility vehicles. The new truck was to climb a 60 percent incline and traverse a 40 percent slope and ford 5 ft (1.5 m) of water and electronics waterproofed to drive through 2.5 ft (0.76 m) of water were specified. The radiator was to be mounted high, sloping over the engine on a forward-hinged hood.

Out of 61 companies that showed interest in the contract, five companies submitted proposals before the deadline in April 1981. In July 1981, the Army awarded contracts to three companies—AM General, Chrysler Corporation, and Teledyne Continental—to build eleven HMMWV prototypes each. The vehicles (six weapon carriers and five utility vehicles) were delivered by May 1982.

The Teledyne HMMWV was based on the rear-engined XR311 Cheetah. Chrysler's HMMWV was based on the Expanded Mobility Truck. Chrysler Defense was sold mid-competition to General Dynamics Land Systems. The AM General HMMWV was developed as a private venture to meet the HMMWV requirement. The first prototype (a weapons carrier variant) was completed in August 1980 and sent to the Nevada Automotive Test Center for testing. AM General nicknamed the prototypes it delivered for the Army competition "Hummer," which AM General had the foresight to trademark.

The vehicles underwent testing at Aberdeen Proving Ground, Maryland and Yuma, Arizona. The vehicles were subjected to over 600,000 miles in trials which included off-road courses in desert and arctic conditions. On 22 March 1983, AM General was awarded the contract. The vehicle's durability and light weight were factors that led to its selection. Production kicked off in April 1984 at AM General's plant in Mishawaka, Indiana and the first Humvees entered service by 1985. AM General was awarded an initial contract for 2,334 vehicles, the first batch of a five-year contract that would see 55,000 vehicles delivered to the U.S. military, including 39,000 vehicles for the Army. 72,000 vehicles had been delivered to the U.S. and foreign customers by the Persian Gulf War of 1991, and 100,000 had been delivered by the Humvee's 10th anniversary in 1995. Ft. Lewis, Washington, and the 2nd Battalion, 47th Infantry, 9th Infantry Division was the testing unit to employ HMMWV in the new concept of a motorized division. Yakima Training Center, Washington, was the main testing grounds for HMMWVs from 1985 through December 1991, when the motorized concept was abandoned and the division inactivated.

In June 1983, a Pentagon report noted the vehicle's "very low" reliability, averaging 370 miles between failures.

In August 1989, AM General was awarded a $1 billion contract from the Army to produce 33,000 HMMWVs.

=== Use in combat ===
HMMWVs first saw combat in Operation Just Cause, the U.S. invasion of Panama in 1989. The HMMWV was designed primarily for personnel and light cargo transport behind front lines, not as a frontline fighting vehicle. Like the previous jeep, the basic first-generation HMMWV has no armor (though armament carriers and hard-shell ambulances did have modest ballistic protection) or protection against chemical, biological, radiological, or nuclear threats. Nevertheless, losses were relatively low in conventional operations, such as the Gulf War. Vehicles and crews suffered considerable damage and losses during the Battle of Mogadishu in 1993 because of the nature of urban engagement. However, the chassis survivability allowed the majority of those crews to return to safety, though the HMMWV was never designed to offer protection against intense small arms fire, much less machine guns and rocket-propelled grenades. With the rise of asymmetric warfare and low-intensity conflicts, the HMMWV was pressed into service in urban combat roles for which it was not originally intended.

After Operation Restore Hope in Somalia, the military recognized a need for a more protected HMMWV. AM General developed the M1114, an armored HMMWV to withstand small arms fire. The M1114 has been in production since 1996, seeing limited use in the Balkans before deployment to the Middle East. This design is superior to the M998 with a larger, more powerful turbocharged engine, air conditioning, and a strengthened suspension system. More importantly, it has a fully armored passenger area protected by hardened steel and bullet-resistant glass. With the increase in direct attacks and asymmetric warfare in Iraq, M1114 production surged from 30 vehicles per month in May 2003 to 400 per month by December 2004, and 650 per month by September 2005.

Humvees were sent into Afghanistan following the September 11 attacks, where they proved invaluable during initial operations. In the early years before IEDs became prevalent, the vehicle was liked by troops for its ability to access rough, mountainous terrain. Some soldiers would remove features from Humvees, including what little armor it had and sometimes even entire doors, to make them lighter and more maneuverable for off-road conditions and to increase visibility. With the onset of the Iraq War, Humvees proved very vulnerable to IEDs; in the first four months of 2006, 67 U.S. troops died in Humvees. To increase protection, the U.S. military hastily added armor kits to the vehicles. Although this somewhat improved survivability, bolting on armor made the Humvee an "ungainly beast", increasing weight and putting a strain on the chassis, which led to unreliability. Armored doors that weighed hundreds of pounds were difficult for troops to open, and the newly armored turret made Humvees top-heavy and increased the danger of rollovers. The U.S. Marine Corps decided to start replacing Humvees in combat with Mine-Resistant, Ambush-Protected (MRAP) vehicles in 2007, and the U.S. Army stated that the vehicle was "no longer feasible for combat" in 2012. However, Humvees have also been used by Taliban insurgents for suicide bombings against the Afghan National Security Forces in the country.

The HMMWV has become the vehicular backbone of U.S. forces around the world. Over 10,000 HMMWVs were employed by coalition forces during the Iraq War. The Humvee has been described as a vehicle with "the right capability for its era": designed to provide payload mobility in protected (safe) areas. However, deploying the vehicle to conflict zones where it was exposed to a full spectrum of threat which it was neither designed to operate, or be survivable in, led to adding protection at the cost of mobility and payload.

On 22 April 2022, Pentagon Press Secretary John F. Kirby described a package of military equipment being transported to Ukraine to assist in its war with Russia, including "100 armored Humvee vehicles". An additional 50 were promised on 19 August 2022, and were delivered at an unknown date. A number of Humvees were used in the assault on the Russian oblast of Belgorod on 22 May 2023. Ukraine first received Humvees from the U.S. in 2001, and they were used by them in peacekeeping operations in Kosovo that same year.

=== Modifications ===
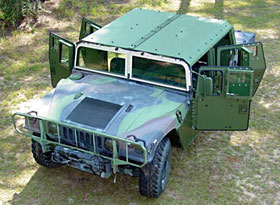
A U.S. Marine Corps M1123 HMMWV in 2004, equipped with a bolt-on MAK armor kit

In December 2004, Secretary of Defense Donald Rumsfeld came under criticism from U.S. troops and their families for not providing better-equipped HMMWVs. Rumsfeld pointed out that, before the war, armor kits were produced only in small numbers per year. As the role of American forces in Iraq changed from fighting the Iraqi Army to suppressing the insurgency, more armor kits were being manufactured, though perhaps not as fast as production facilities were capable. Even more advanced kits were also being developed. While these kits are much more effective against all types of attacks, they weigh from 1,500 to 2,200 lb (680 to 1,000 kg) and have some of the same drawbacks as the improvised armor. Unlike similar-sized civilian cargo and tow trucks, which typically have dual rear wheels to reduce sway, the HMMWV has single rear wheels because of its independent rear suspension coupled with the body design.

Most up-armored HMMWVs hold up well against lateral attacks when the blast is distributed in all different directions but offer little protection from a mine blast below the truck, such as buried IEDs and land mines. Explosively formed penetrators (EFPs) can also defeat the armor kits, causing casualties.

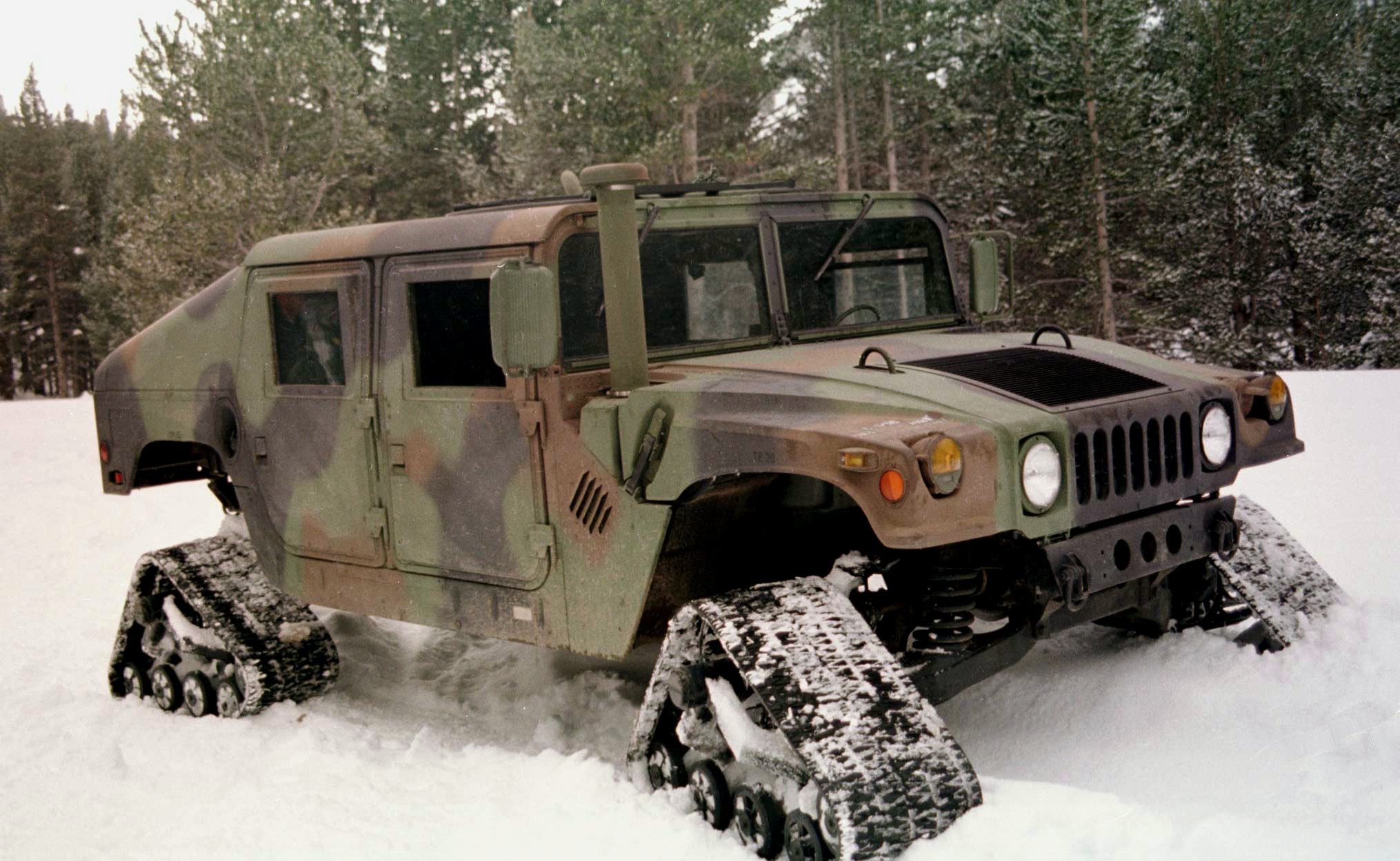
At the Bridgeport, California Mountain Warfare Training Center in March 1997, a test HMMWV drives through the snow, equipped with Mattracks treads

The armor kits fielded include the Armor Survivability Kit (ASK), FRAG 5, FRAG 6, as well as upgrade kits to the M1151. The ASK was the first fielded in October 2003, adding about 1,000 pounds (450 kg) to the weight of the vehicle. Armor Holdings fielded an even lighter kit, adding only 750 pounds (340 kg) to the vehicle's weight. The Marine Armor Kit (MAK), fielded in January 2005, offers more protection than the M1114 but also increases weight. The FRAG 5 offered even more protection but was still inadequate to stop EFP attacks. The FRAG 6 kit is designed to do just that, however its increased protection adds over 1,000 lb (450 kg) the vehicle over the FRAG 5 kit, and the width is increased by 2 feet (61 cm). The doors may also require a mechanical assist device to open and close.

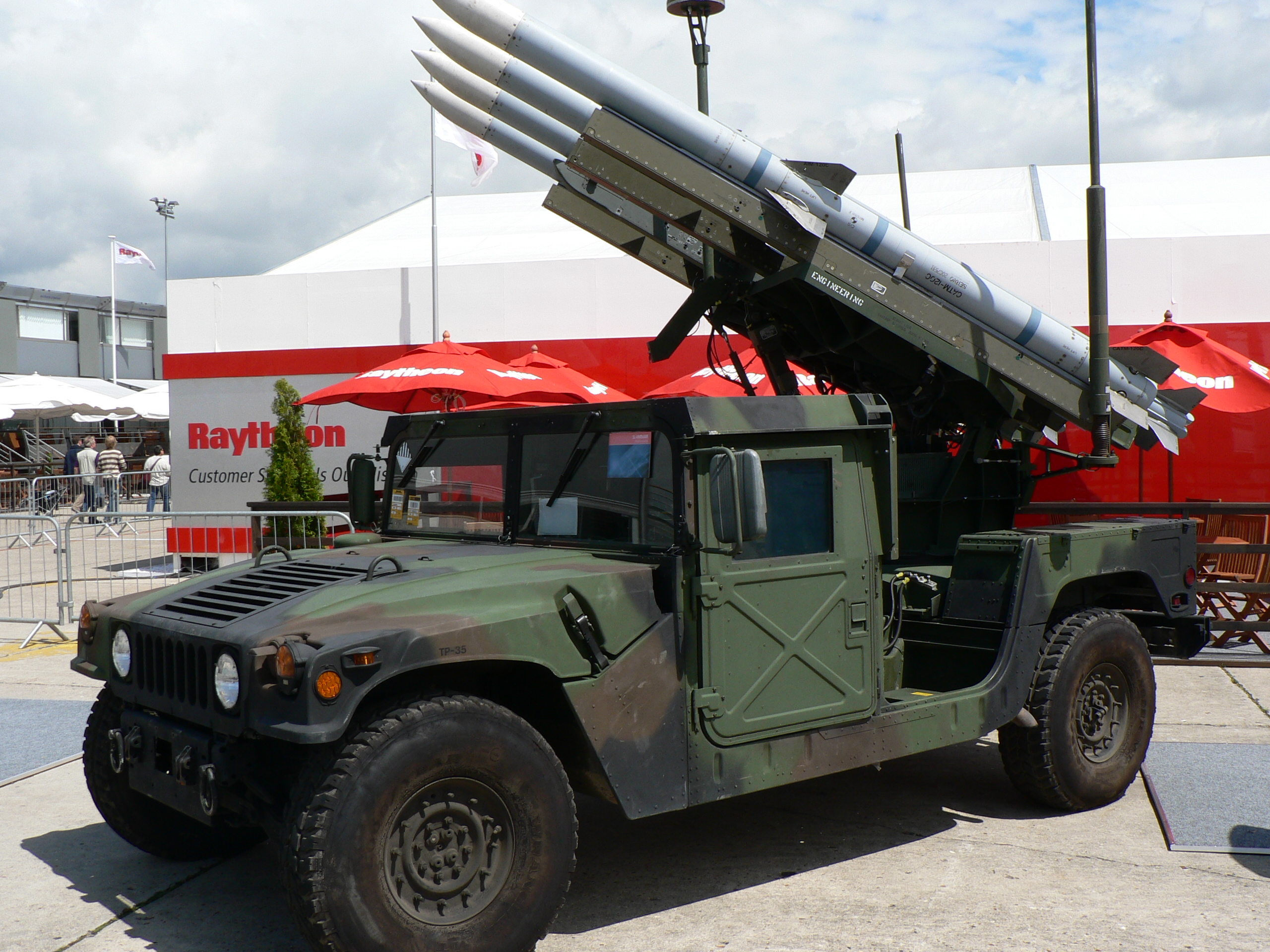
A HMMWV equipped with SLAMRAAM surface-to-air missiles, on display at the Paris Air Show in June 2007

Another drawback of the up-armored HMMWVs occurs during an accident or attack, when the heavily armored doors tend to jam shut, trapping the troops inside. As a result, the U.S. Army Aviation and Missile Research, Development, and Engineering Center developed the Humvee Crew Extraction D-ring in 2006. The D-ring hooks on the door of the HMMWV so that another vehicle can rip the door off with a tow strap, chain, or cable to free the troops inside. The D-ring was later recognized as one of the top 10 greatest Army inventions of 2006. In addition, Vehicle Emergency Escape (VEE) windows, developed by BAE Systems, were fielded for use on the M1114 up-armored HMMWV, with 1,000 kits ordered.

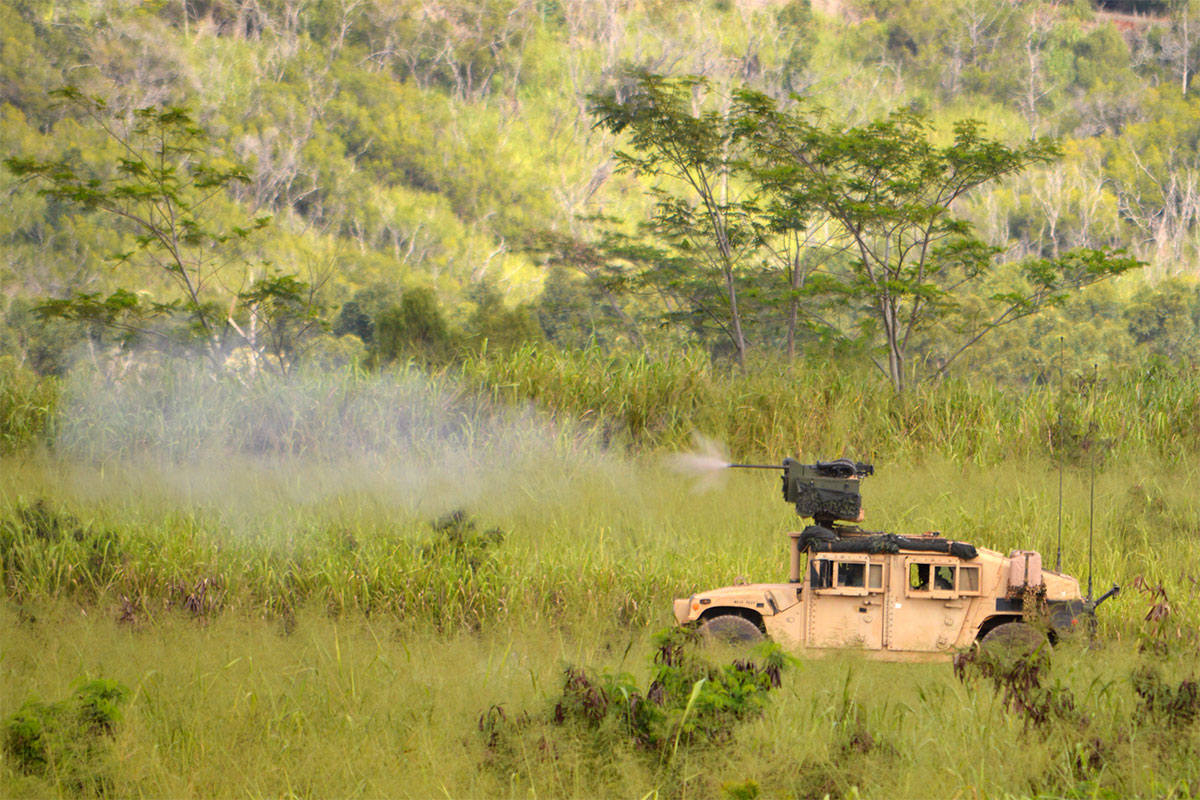
Soldiers of 3rd BCT/25th ID use an M153 CROWS atop an M1115A1 HMMWV at the Battle Area Complex, Schofield Barracks, Hawaii, 2017

The soldier manning the exposed crew-served weapon on top of the vehicle is extremely vulnerable. In response, many HMMWVs have been fitted with basic gun shields or turrets, as was the case with M113 APCs after they were first deployed in Vietnam. The U.S. military is currently evaluating a new form of protection, developed by BAE Systems as well as systems designed by the Army, which are already in theater. The new gunner's seat is protected by 1.5 to 2 feet (46 to 61 cm) high steel plates with bulletproof glass windows. Additionally, some HMMWVs have been fitted with a remotely operated CROWS weapon station, which slaves the machine gun to controls in the back seat so it can be fired without exposing the crew. The Boomerang anti-sniper system was also fielded by some HMMWVs in Iraq to immediately give troops the location of insurgents firing on them.

Another weakness for the HMMWV has proven to be its size, which limited its deployment in Afghanistan because it is too wide for the smallest roads and too large for many forms of air transport compared to jeeps or Land Rover-sized vehicles (which are, respectively, 24 and 15 inches narrower). This size also limits the ability of the vehicle to be manhandled out of situations.

=== Alternatives ===
The Army purchased a purpose-built armored car, the M1117 armored security vehicle, also known as an armored personnel carrier (APC), in limited numbers for use by the United States Army Military Police Corps. In 2007, the Marine Corps announced an intention to replace all HMMWVs in Iraq with MRAPs because of high loss rates and issued contracts for the purchase of several thousand of these vehicles, which include the International MaxxPro, the BAE OMC RG-31, the BAE RG-33 and Caiman, and the Force Protection Cougar, which were deployed primarily for mine clearing duties. Heavier models of infantry mobility vehicles (IMV) can also be used for patrol vehicles. The MaxxPro Line has been shown to have the highest rate of vehicle rollover accidents because of its very high center of gravity and immense weight.

=== Replacement and future ===
The Humvee replacement process undertaken by the U.S. military focused on interim replacement with MRAPs and long-term replacement with the Joint Light Tactical Vehicle (JLTV). The HMMWV has evolved several times since its introduction and was used in tactical roles for which it was never originally intended. The military pursued several initiatives to replace it, both in the short and long terms. The short-term replacement efforts utilized commercial off-the-shelf vehicles as part of the Mine Resistant Ambush Protected (MRAP) program. These vehicles were procured to replace Humvees in combat theaters. The long-term replacement for the Humvee is the JLTV which is designed from the ground up. The Future Tactical Truck System (FTTS) program was initiated to analyze potential requirements for a Humvee replacement. Various prototype vehicles such as the MillenWorks Light Utility Vehicle, and the ULTRA AP have been constructed as part of these efforts. The JLTV contract was awarded to Oshkosh in August 2015.

The U.S. Marine Corps issued a request for proposals in 2013 for its Humvee sustainment modification initiative to upgrade 6,700 expanded capacity vehicles (ECVs). The Marines plan to field the JLTV but do not have enough funding to completely replace all Humvees, so they decided to continue sustaining their fleet. Key areas of improvement include upgrades to the suspension to reduce the amount of force transferred to the chassis, upgrading the engine and transmission for better fuel efficiency, enhancements to the cooling system to prevent overheating, a central tire inflation system to improve off-road mobility and ride quality, and increased underbody survivability. Testing of upgraded Humvees was to occur in 2014, with production and installation occurring from 2015 through 2018. Older A2 series Humvees make up half the current fleet, and 4,000 are to be disposed of through foreign military sales and transfers. By 2017, the Marines' light tactical vehicle fleet is to consist of 3,500 A2 series Humvees, 9,500 ECV Humvees, and 5,000 JLTVs, with 18,000 vehicles in total. Humvees in service with the Marine Corps will be upgraded through 2030. The Marines shelved the Humvee modernization effort in March 2015 because of budget cuts.

Several companies are offering modifications to maintain the remaining U.S. military Humvee fleets. Oshkosh Corporation is offering Humvee upgrades to the Marine Corps in addition to its JLTV offering, which are modular and scalable to provide varying levels of capabilities at a range of prices that can be provided individually or as complete packages. Their approach is centered around the TAK-4 independent suspension system, which delivers greater offroad profile capability, improved ride quality, an increase in maximum speed, greater whole-vehicle durability, and restored payload capacity and ground clearance. Northrop Grumman developed a new chassis and powertrain for the Humvee that would combine the mobility and payload capabilities of original vehicle variants while maintaining the protection levels of up-armored versions. The cost to upgrade one Humvee with Northrop Grumman's features is $145,000. Textron has offered another Humvee upgrade option called the Survivable Combat Tactical Vehicle (SCTV) that restores mobility and survivability over armored Humvee levels. Although the SCTV costs more at $200,000 per vehicle, the company claims it can restore the Humvee for operational use, combining Humvee-level mobility and transportability with MRAP-level underbody protection as a transitional solution until the JLTV is introduced in significant numbers.

One suggested future role for the Humvee is as an autonomous unmanned ground vehicle (UGV). If converted to a UGV, the vehicle could serve as a mobile scout vehicle with armor features removed to enhance mobility and terrain accessibility, since there would be no occupants needing protection. Because there will still be tens of thousands of Humvees in the U.S. inventory after the JLTV enters service, it could be a low-cost way to build an unmanned combat vehicle fleet. Autonomy features would allow the Humvees to drive themselves and one soldier to control a "swarm" of several vehicles.

Although the Army plans to buy 49,100 JLTVs and the Marine Corps 5,500, they are not a one-for-one replacement for the Humvee, and both services will still be left operating large fleets. For the Marines, 69 JLTVs will replace the 74 Humvees in all active infantry battalions to cover its expeditionary forces. The Marine JLTV order is planned to be completed by 2022, leaving the remainder of the Corps' 13,000-strong Humvee force scattered around support organizations while soft-skinned Humvees will provide support behind the forward-deployed Marine Expeditionary Unit. The Army does not plan to replace Humvees in the Army National Guard and is considering options on how many of its 120,000 vehicles will be replaced, sustained, or modernized. Even if half of the force is replaced by JLTVs, the entire planned order will not be complete until 2040. If upgrades are chosen for the remaining Humvees, the cost would likely have to not exceed $100,000 per vehicle. The Humvee is expected to remain in U.S. military service until at least 2050. Ambulance variants of the Humvee will especially remain in active use, as the JLTV could not be modified to serve as one due to weight issues.

On 30 April 2025, US Secretary of Defense Pete Hegseth ordered the Secretary of the Army to "end procurement of obsolete systems, and cancel or scale back ineffective or redundant programs, including manned aircraft, excess ground vehicles (e.g., HMMWV), and outdated UAVs". The Army said it would stop procuring Humvees and JLTVs. AM General said it would continue producing the vehicles, and it was unclear whether existing contracts would be cancelled.

== Design features ==
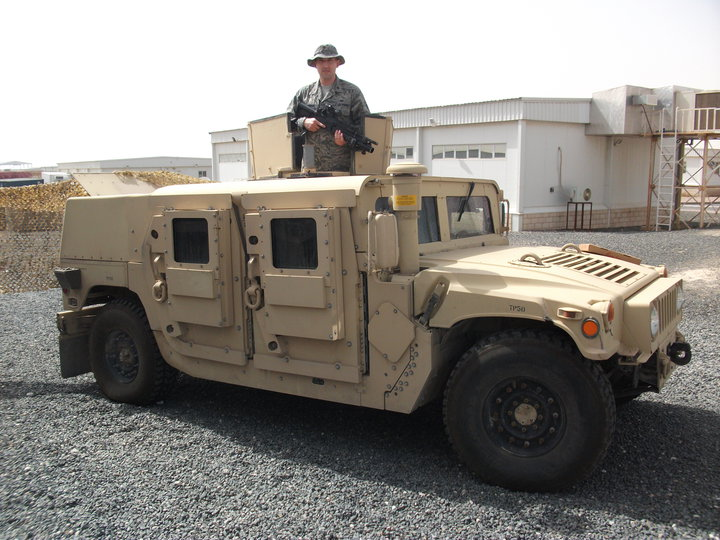
A U.S. Air Force airman in Southwest Asia stands in the ring mount of a FRAG-6–reinforced HMMWV, 2010

The Humvee seats four people with an available fully enclosed aluminum cabin with a vertical windshield. It has all-wheel drive with an independent suspension and helical gear-reduction hubs similar to portal axles which attach towards the top rather than the center of each wheel to allow the drivetrain shafts to be raised for 16 in (410 mm) ground clearance. The body is mounted on a narrow steel frame with boxed rails and five cross members for rigidity. The rails act as sliders to protect the drivetrain which is nestled between and above the rails. Raising the drivetrain into the cabin area and lowering the seats into the frame creates a chest-high transmission hump which separates passengers on each side and lowers the overall center of gravity compared to most trucks where the body and passengers are above the frame.

The Humvee uses V8 powertrains from General Motors and General Engine Products (GEP), a wholly owned subsidiary of AM General. Early iterations were issued with General Motors' 6.2-liter Detroit Diesel V8. Later iterations were fitted with the larger and improved 6.5-liter Detroit Diesel V8. Power output for the naturally-aspirated version of this engine is 160–170 hp (119–127 kW; 162–172 PS) and 290 lb⋅ft (393 N⋅m) of torque, while the turbocharged version produces 190–205 hp (142–153 kW; 193–208 PS) and 385–440 lb⋅ft (522–597 N⋅m). GEP uses a modified version of the 6.5-liter Detroit Diesel V8 called the Optimizer 6500. This engine features improvements for better long-term reliability and has a power output of 205 hp (153 kW; 208 PS) and 440 lb⋅ft (597 N⋅m) of torque.

The vehicle has double wishbone suspension with portal gear hubs on all 4 wheels and inboard disc brakes. The brake discs are not mounted at the wheels, as on conventional cars, but are inboard of the half-shafts, attached outboard of the differentials. The front and rear differentials are Torsen type, and the center differential is of the lockable type. Torque-biasing differentials allows forward movement as long as at least one wheel has traction. It runs on specialized 37 × 12.5 radial tires with low-profile runflat devices. Newer HMMWV versions can be equipped with a central tire inflation system (CTIS) kit in the field. While it is optimized for off-road mobility, it can achieve 55 mph (89 km/h) at maximum weight with a top speed of 70 mph (110 km/h).

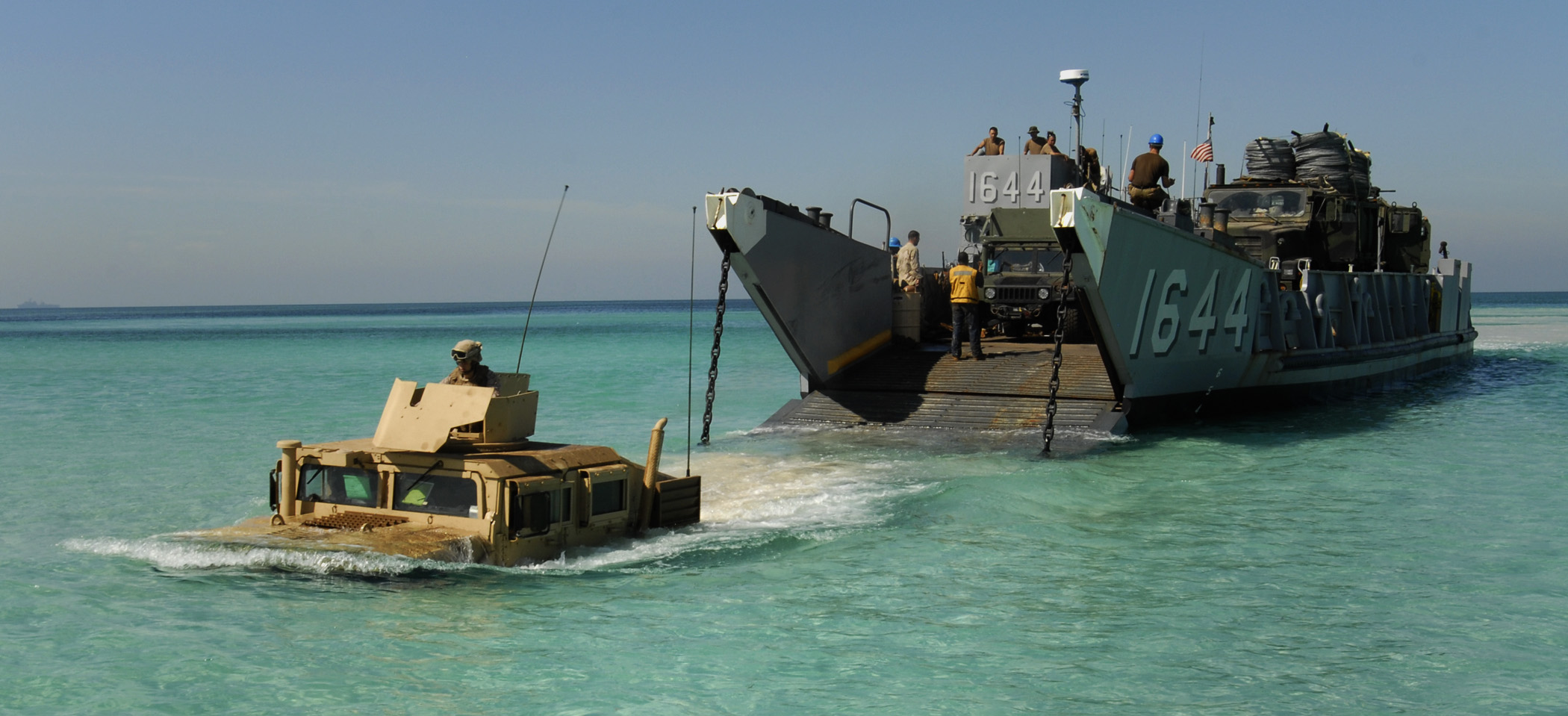
Humvee fording

HMMWVs are well suited for airmobile operations as they are transportable by C-130 or larger combat transports, droppable by parachute, and can be sling-loaded from helicopters, though there are smaller vehicles such as the Growler which were designed to fit into smaller craft such as the V-22. In combat conditions, the HMMWV can be delivered by the Low Altitude Parachute Extraction System which pulls the vehicle out of the open rear ramp just above the ground without the aircraft having to land.

There are at least 17 variants of the HMMWV in service with the U.S. military. HMMWVs serve as cargo/troop carriers, automatic weapons platforms, ambulances (four litter patients or eight ambulatory patients), M220 TOW missile carriers, M119 howitzer prime movers, M1097 Avenger Pedestal Mounted Stinger platforms, MRQ-12 direct air support vehicles, S250 shelter carriers, and other roles. The HMMWV is capable of fording 2.5 feet (0.76 m) normally, or 5 feet (1.5 m) with the deep-water fording kits installed.

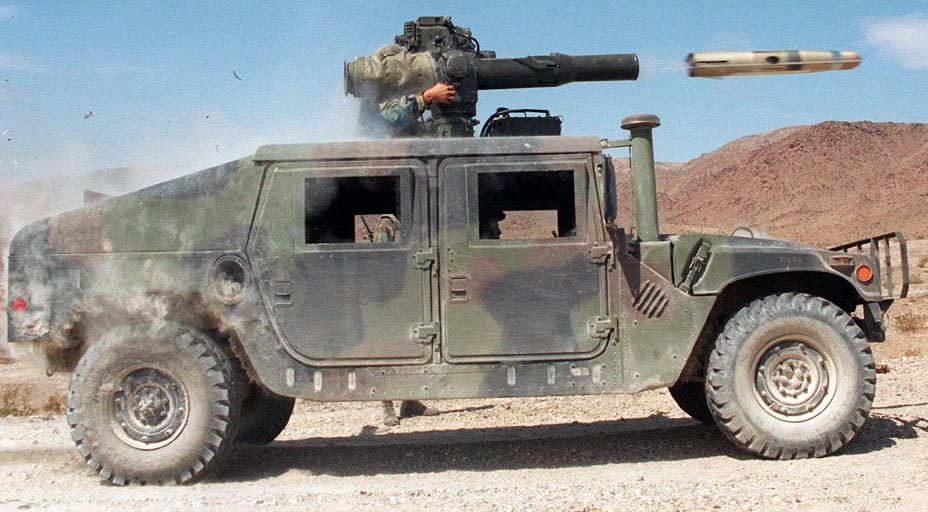
A U.S. Army HMMWV firing a BGM-71 TOW missile

Optional equipment includes a winch (maximum load capacity 6,000 lb (2,700 kg) and supplemental armor. The M1025/M1026 and M1043/M1044 armament carriers provide mounting and firing capabilities for the M134 Minigun, the Mk 19 grenade launcher, the M2 heavy machine gun, the GAU-19A/B gatling gun, the M240G/B machine gun and M249 SAW.

The M1114 "up-armored" HMMWV, introduced in 1996, also features a similar weapons mount. In addition, some M1114 and M1116 up-armored and M1117 armored security vehicle models feature a Common Remotely Operated Weapon Station (CROWS), which allows the gunner to operate from inside the vehicle, and/or the Boomerang anti-sniper detection system. Recent improvements have also led to the development of the M1151 model, which quickly rendered the previous models obsolete. By replacing the M1114, M1116, and earlier armored HMMWV types with a single model, the U.S. Army hopes to lower maintenance costs.

The latest iteration of the Humvee series can be seen in the M1151A1 and later up-armored A1-versions. It has a stronger suspension and larger 6.5 liter turbo-diesel engine to accommodate the weight of up to 680 kg (1,500 lb) of additional armor. The armor protection can be installed or taken off depending on the operating environment, so the vehicles can move more efficiently without armor when there is no threat of attack. There is some underbody armor that moderately protects against mines and roadside bombs. Other improvements include Vehicle Emergency Escape (VEE) windows that can be quickly removed so troops inside can escape in the event of a rollover, jammed door, or the vehicle catching fire, and a blast chimney that vents the force of a bomb blast upwards and away from the occupants. The M1151A1 has a crew of four, can carry 2,000 lb (910 kg) of payload, and can tow a 4,000 lb (1,800 kg) load. On roads, it has a top speed of 80 km/h (50 mph) and a range of 480 km (300 mi).

== Variants ==
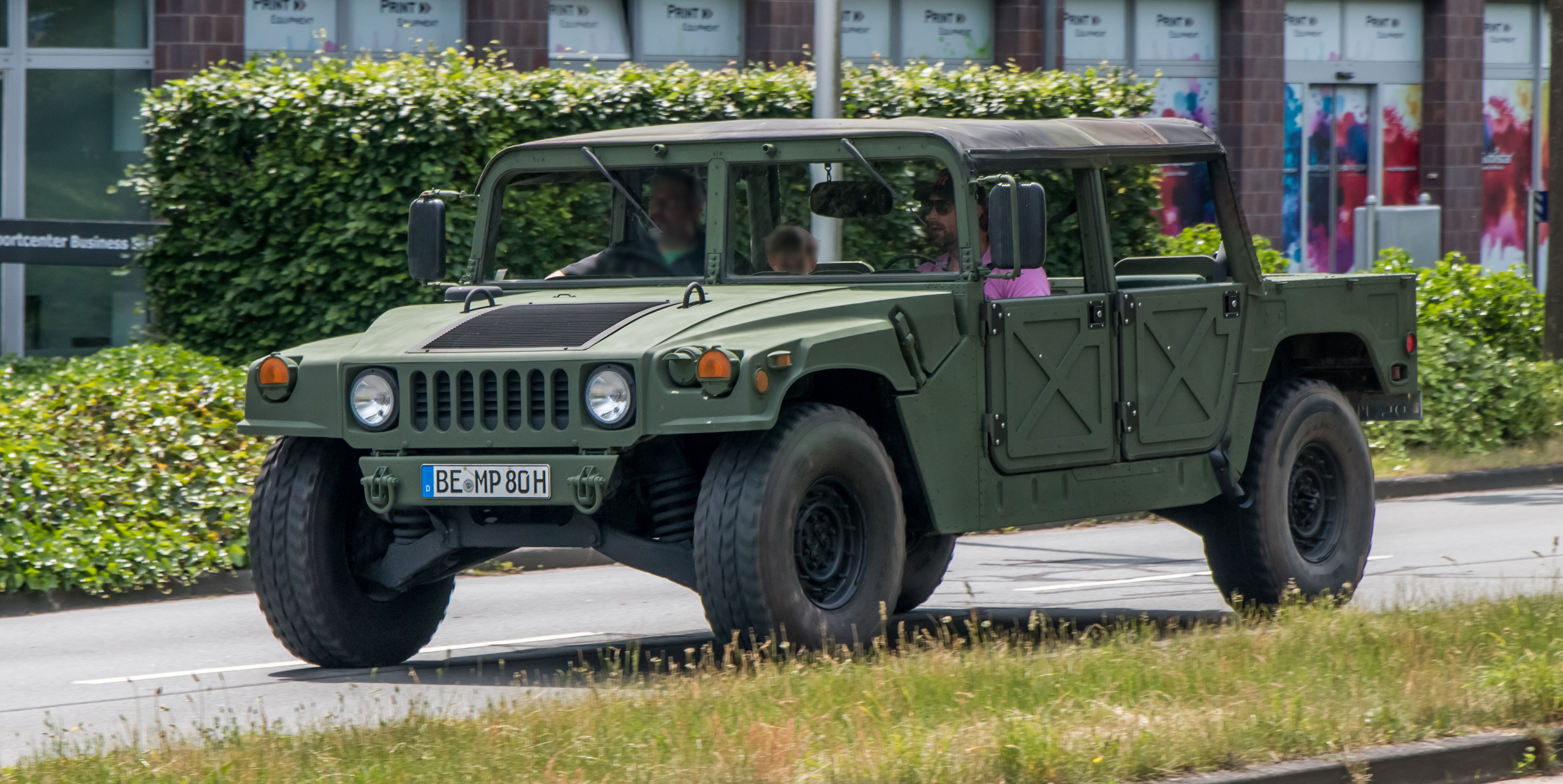
M998 registered as a historical vehicle in Warendorf

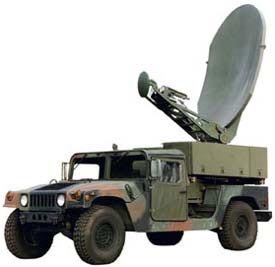
HMMWV with a Phoenix satellite communications dish

=== Major HMMWV A0/A1/A2 versions ===
With the introduction of the A1 series the number of models was reduced, with further designation revisions when the A2 series was introduced.

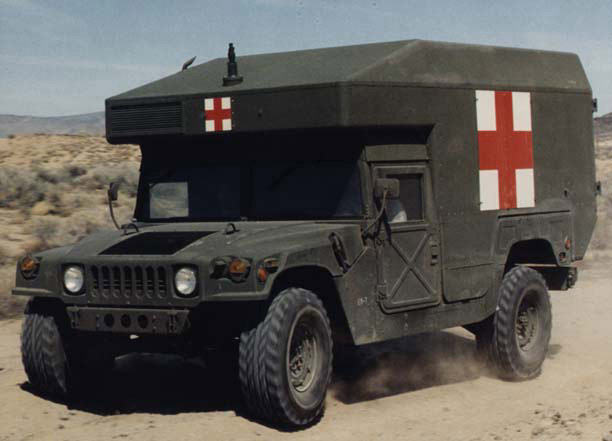
A U.S. military M997 ambulance, emblazoned with the Red Cross

- M56/M56A1 Coyote smoke generator carrier (mounted on an HMMWV; not a type classified HMMWV)
- M707 Knight (replaced, originally mounted on an M1025A2 HMMWV; not a type classified HMMWV)
- M966/M966A1 TOW missile carrier, basic armor, without a winch
- M996 mini-ambulance, two-litter, hardtop
- M997/M997A1/M997A2 maxi-ambulance, four-litter, basic armor
- M998/M998A1 cargo/troop carrier without a winch
- M998 HMMWV Avenger (mounted on an HMMWV; not a type classified HMMWV)
- M1025/M1025A1 armament carrier, basic armor, without a winch
- M1025A2 armament/TOW missile carrier, basic armor
- M1026/M1026A1 armament carrier, basic armor, with winch
- M1035/M1035A1/M1035A2 soft-top ambulance, two-litter
- M1036 TOW missile carrier, basic armor, with winch
- M1037 shelter carrier, without a winch
- M1037 shelter carrier MSE
- M1038/M1038A1 cargo/troop carrier with winch
- M1042 shelter carrier, with winch
- M1043/M1043A1 armament carrier, supplemental armor, without a winch
- M1043A2 armament carrier, supplemental armor
- M1044/M1044A1 armament carrier, supplemental armor, with winch
- M1045/M1045A1 TOW missile carrier, supplemental armor, without a winch
- M1045A2 TOW missile carrier, supplemental armor
- M1046/M1046A1 TOW missile carrier, supplemental armor, with winch
- M1069 tractor for M119 105 mm gun

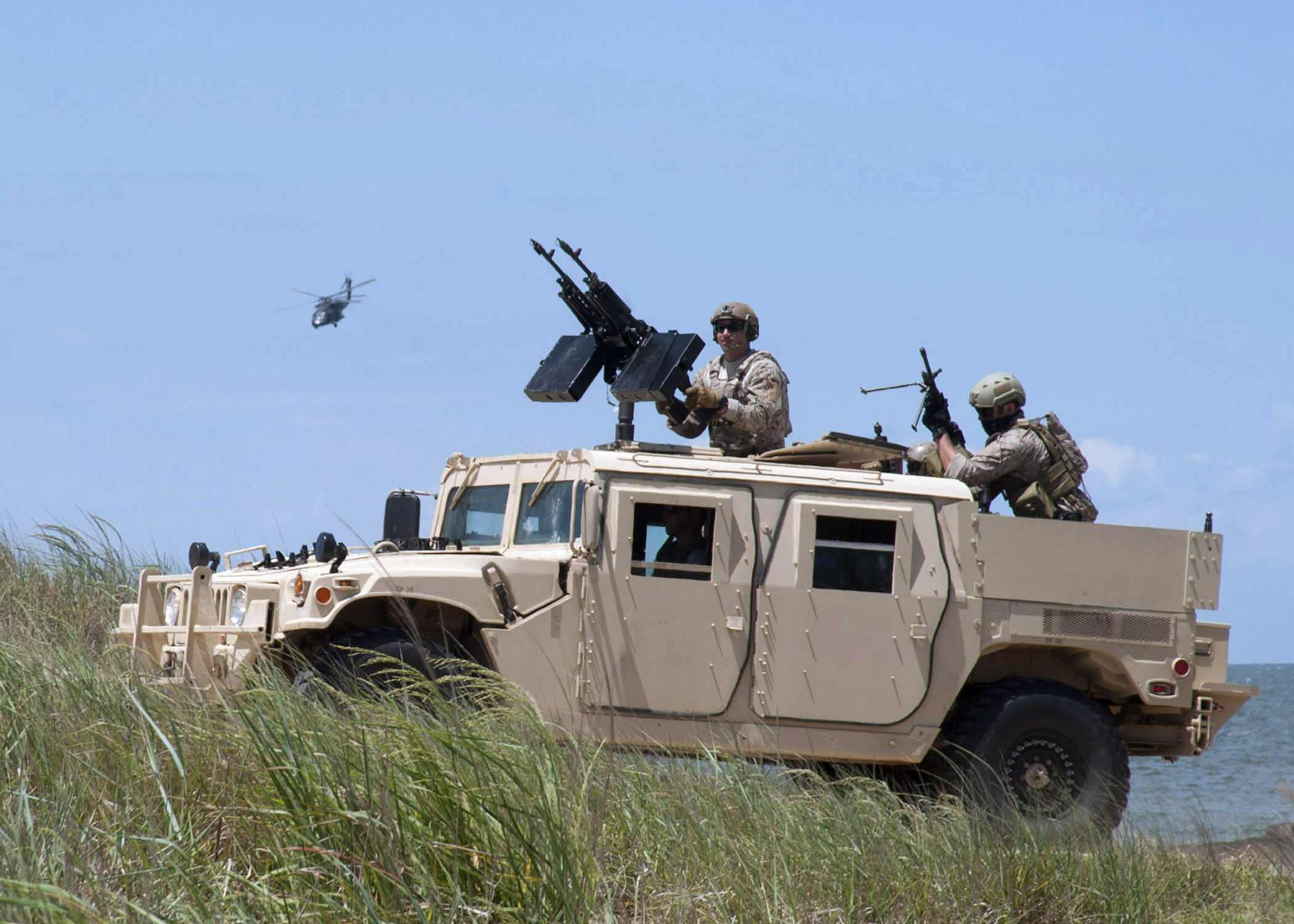
U.S. Navy SEALs and GMV-N

- M1097/M1097A1 heavy hummer variant (HHV)
- M1097A2 base platform
- M1097A2 cargo/troop carrier/prime mover (replacing the M998A1)
- M1097A2 shelter carrier
- M1097 heavy HMMWV Avenger (mounted on an HMMWV; not a type classified HMMWV)
- Packhorse – attachment to convert an M1097 to tractor version for semi-trailers
- XM1109 up-armored heavy Hummer variant (UA-HHV) (replaced by M1114)
- M1123 troop/cargo (U.S. Marines specific M1097A2)

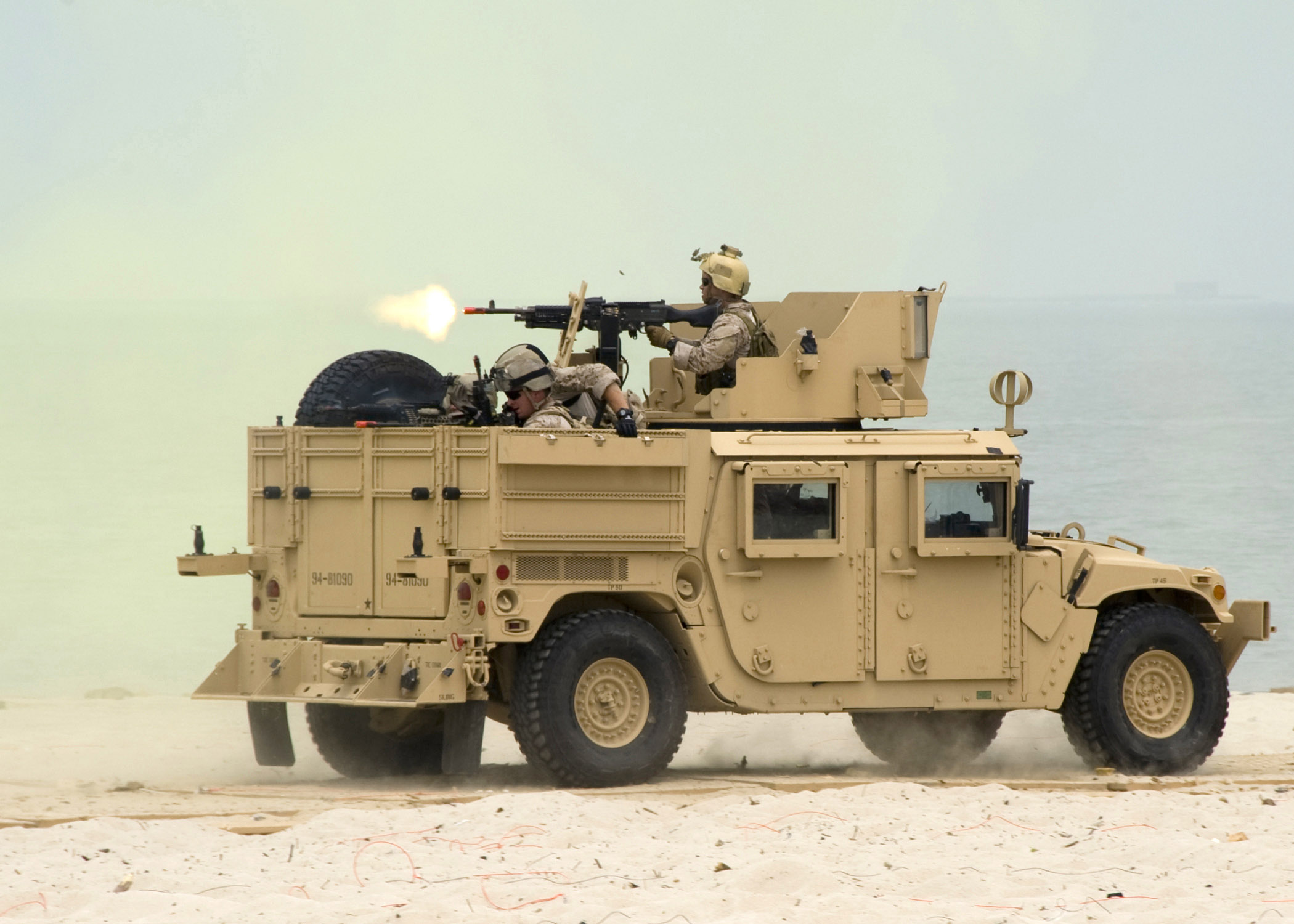
Advanced up-armored HMMWV including armored gun turret

- Active Denial System (mounted on an HMMWV)
- Ground mobility vehicle (GMV)—USSOCOM Special Ops variants—initially based on the M1025; later GMV models based on the M1113 chassis. Another model, based on the M1165 HMMWV can be fitted with armor kits to create an 'up-armored' GMV with additional armor plating and an optional ballistic shield around the top gunner's turret.

Variants are GMV-S (Army Special Forces), GMV-R (75th Ranger Regiment), GMV-N (Navy SEALs), GMV-T/GMV-SD/GMV-ST - AFSOC variants, and the GMV-M (Marine Corps MARSOC) variant.

- IMETS (mounted on an HMMWV; not a type classified HMMWV)
- ZEUS-HLONS (mounted on an HMMWV; not a type classified HMMWV)
- Scorpion – single unit version, fitted with 2B9 Vasilek 82 mm automatic mortar. This is a heavy chassis HMMWV developed in 2004 by engineers at the U.S. Army's Picatinny Arsenal. The mortar itself can fire on single shots or automatic using four-round clips. The range for direct fire is 1000 m and the indirect fire is 4000 m. It is also intended to provide another means of destroying roadside bombs but at a safer standoff range. Only one has been produced.

=== M1113 expanded capacity vehicle (ECV) ===
Under contract to the US Army, AM General developed the M1113 expanded capacity vehicle (ECV). The M1097A2 is the basis for the expanded capacity vehicle (ECV). The ECV provided the payload capacity allowing for larger and heavier communications shelters, improved armor protection level for scouts, military police, security police, and explosive ordnance disposal platforms.

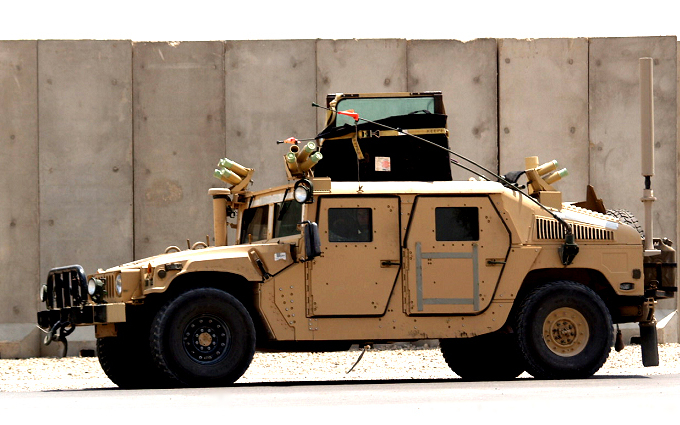
An M1114 with a Kevlar-wrapped turret returns from a combat logistics patrol (CLP) mission to CAMP Adder

In late 1995, the production of the M1114 based on the improved ECV chassis began. The M1114 meets Army requirements for a scout, military police, and explosive ordnance disposal vehicle with improved ballistic protection levels. The M1114 provides protection against 7.62 mm armor-piercing projectiles, 155 mm artillery air bursts and 12 lb (5.4 kg) anti-tank mine blasts.

In June 1996, the U.S. Army purchased an initial 390 M1114s for operations in Bosnia. The U.S. Air Force has several M1114 vehicles that differ in detail from the U.S. Army model. Under the designation M1116, the type was specifically designed and tailored to the needs of the U.S. Air Force. The M1116 features an expanded cargo area, armored housing for the turret gunner, and increased interior heating and air conditioning system. The M1114 and M1116 received armor at O'Gara-Hess & Eisenhardt Armoring Company of Fairfield, Ohio. The M1145 offers the protection of the M1114 and M1116 for Air Force Air Support Operations Squadrons (ASOS). Designed to protect Forward Air Controllers, modifications include perimeter ballistic protection, overhead burst protection, IED protection, mine blast protection, and 'white glass' transparent armor. Before the introduction of the latest armored HMMWV variants, and between 1993 and June 2006, Armor Holdings produced more than 17,500 armored HMMWVs (more than 14,000 between 2003 and 2007), all but about 160 of the earliest models were M1114, with smaller numbers of M1116 and M1045. The extended capacity HMMWVs, such as the M1165 can drive over an 18 in (460 mm) vertical wall and carry a 6,820 lb (3,090 kg) payload.

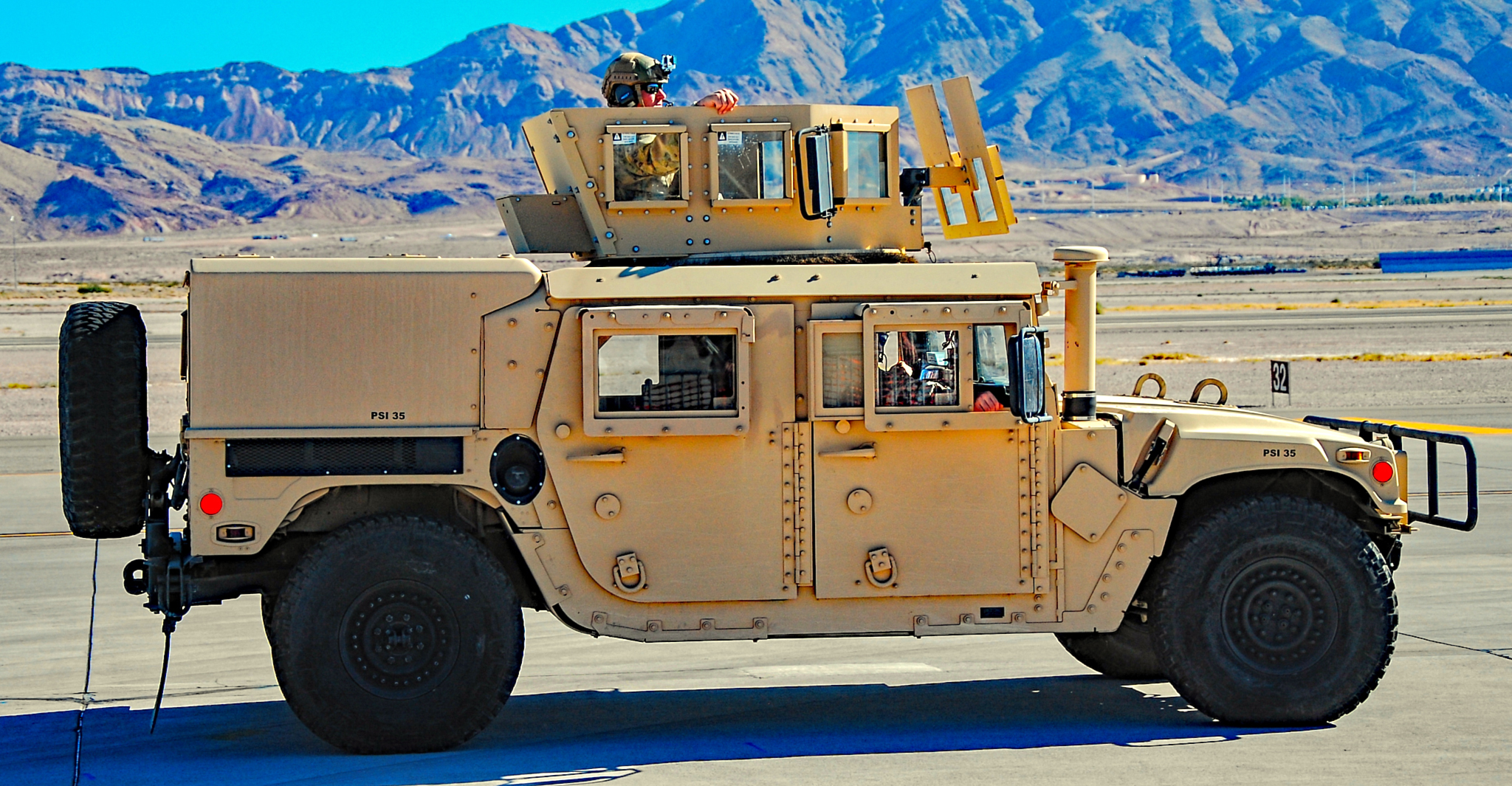
M1165A1, Aviation Nation 2014 US Air Show – Nellis AFB, Las Vegas

- M1113 shelter carrier – base for special operations vehicles and communications shelter carriers
- M1114 up-armored armament carrier
- M1115 TOW carrier (no evidence of fielding)
- M1116 U.S. Air Force up-armored armament carrier
- M1121 TOW carrier
- M1145 U.S. Air Force FAC
- M1151 enhanced armament carrier (up-armored capable)
- M1152 enhanced troop/cargo/shelter carrier (up-armored capable)
- M1165 up-armored HMMWV
- M1167 up-armored TOW carrier

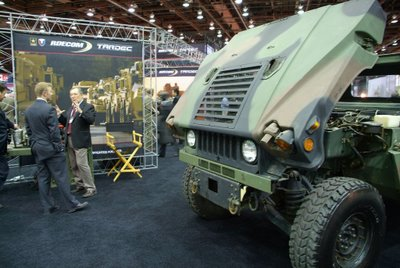
An M1113 Humvee chassis-mounted XM1124 hybrid-electric diesel-series hybrid-powered HMMWV, September 2009

- Composite HMMWV – a prototype developed by TPI Composites of Rhode Island and AM General. The purpose of the concept vehicle is to reduce the vehicle's weight so that it may more easily carry an up-armor kit. TPI's all-composite HMMWV saves approximately 900 pounds (410 kg) when compared to a current steel and aluminum HMMWV.
- A prototype XM1124 hybrid-electric Humvee on an M1113 Humvee chassis powered by a diesel-series hybrid featuring an all-electric drive train has been developed by RDECOM/TARDEC. The vehicle has a 6 mi (9.7 km) full-electric range for silent operations. It may have less emissions and save fuel in the battlefield, and it can increase the survival rate in emergencies such as if one of the engines is destroyed or fails.
- NXT 360 Humvee – This variant is available as an independent vehicle or upgrades for the M1100 Humvee series since June 2018.
- HUMVEE 2-CT Hawkeye 105mm Mobile Howitzer System: Variant of the HMMWV designed by AM General, it is a redesigned M1152 chassis carrying a mounted version of the M119 howitzer. Sent to be tested by the Ukrainian armed forces.

=== International versions ===
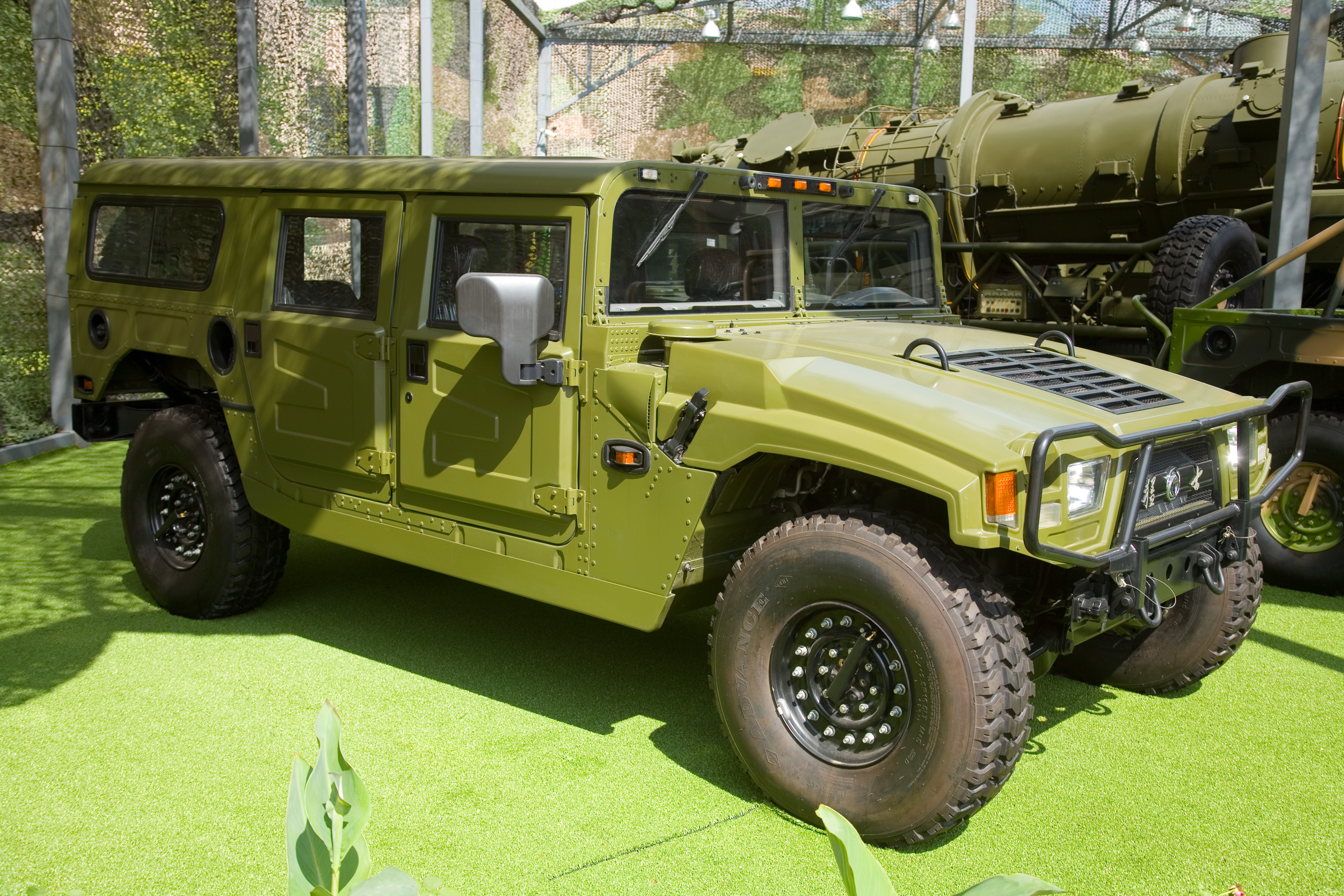
A Dongfeng Mengshi (lit. 'Eastwind Warrior') EQ2050 (licensed-built of the HMMWV) at China's People's Revolution Military Museum in August 2007, during the 'Our Troops towards the Sky' exhibition

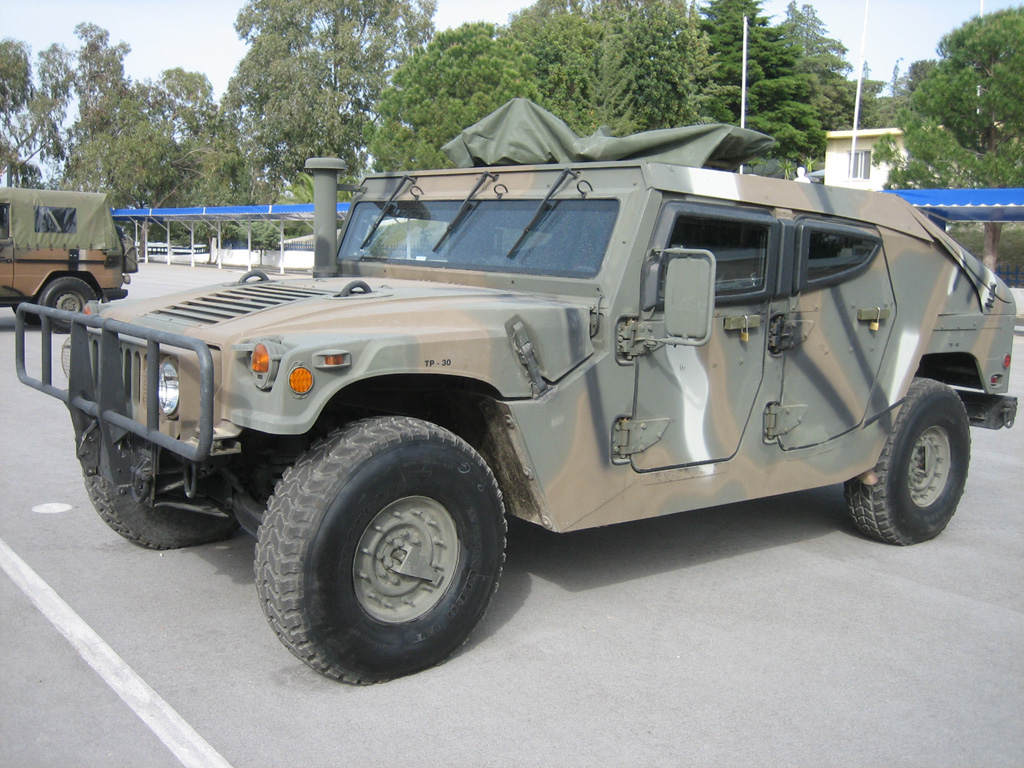
Greek Army M1114GR HMMWV with the ability to mount a 9M133 Kornet on top, April 2007

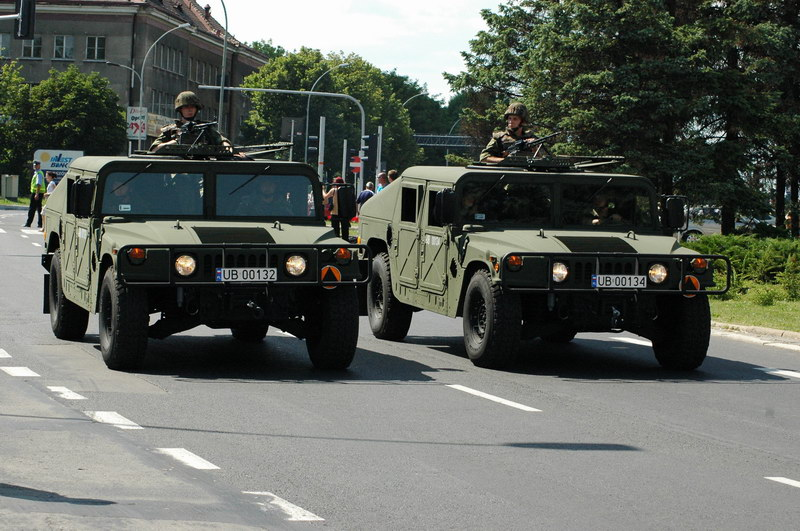
Polish Army M1043A2 HMMWV, July 2005

- Bulgaria – Bulgarian HMMWVs have been fitted with PKS general-purpose machine guns. Bulgaria usually replaces Western machine guns on its vehicles to simplify maintenance, since the country is an active producer of Russian or Soviet-origin weapons.
- China - EQ2050/SQF2040 – See also Humvee clone manufacturing in China. Early generations of the vehicle are license-built Hummer H1, while later generations of the vehicles are of indigenous design. The licensed-built version rely on imported U.S.-made parts, including the chassis, gearbox, and diesel engine, while it gradually increase the percentage of indigenous-made content on the vehicles recently since China's People's Liberation Army is unlikely to accept any equipment that relies largely on foreign-made parts.
- Egypt – AOI equips HMMWVs with anti-armor weaponry, including TOW, Milan, or HOT missiles.
- Georgia – Georgian HMMWVs have been fitted with PK general-purpose machine guns.
- Greece – Greek HMMWVs, built entirely by ELVO in Greece, are equipped to fire the Russian 9M133 Kornet ATGM. They have a storage room for 10 missiles. Another version, the M1115GR, is equipped with the HK GMG 40. Israel's Plasan has developed armored versions of the HMMWV, assembled by ELVO in Greece as the M1114GR, M1115GR and M1118GR. ELVO also produced the Ambulance version, a SOF version, and an engineering version of the HMMWV for the Hellenic Army.
- Israel – Plasan has also designed and supplied an HMMWV armored protection kit for the Portuguese Army, and a different version assembled by Automotive Industries in Nazareth for the Israel Defense Forces.
- Mexico – The Dirección General de Industria Militar (DGIM), the Mexican Army's prime wholly owned military manufacturer, builds the HMMWV under license in Mexico after a small number of US-built Humvees proved to be reliable within the Mexican Army. Mexican HMMWVs are similar to the US-built models but are slightly longer. They feature a standard selective shift automatic transmission connected to a Mercedes Benz diesel engine and an anti-spalling layer in the passenger cabin. Many are equipped with bulletproof windows and a layer of armor unique to these Mexican HMMWVs. In 2010, Mexico displayed a wagon variant with a second gun hatch to cover the rear of the vehicle. This version also featured a more powerful V12 engine and civilian road wheels to increase top speed capabilities in urban areas.

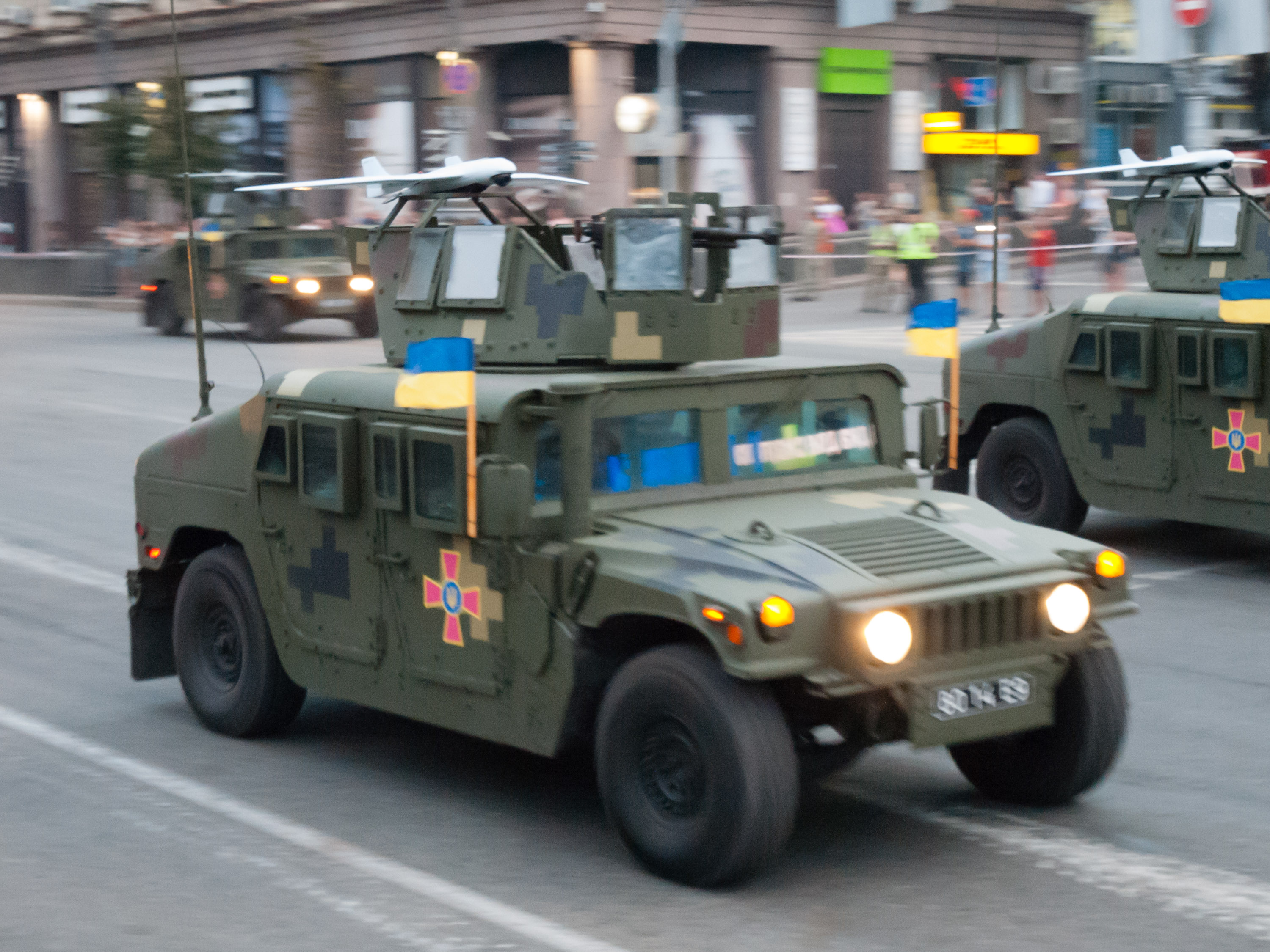
Ukrainian Army M1167A1 HMMWV, rehearsal for the Independence Day military parade in Kyiv, 2018

- Poland – Polish Land Forces operate 222 HMMWVs (5 unknown variants are operated by Polish Special Forces). Over 200 are used by the 18th Airborne Battalion which is a part of the 6th Airborne Brigade. The used variants are designated as follows: Tumak-2 – M1043A2, Tumak-3 – M1025A2, Tumak-4 – M1097A2, Tumak-5 – M1045A2, Tumak-6 – M1097A2 (variant used for transport of special containers), Tumak-7 – M1035A2. All vehicles are modified to meet Polish road regulations and are equipped with Polish communication devices. 140 HMMWVs are equipped with a Fonet digital internal communication device. 120 Tumak-2s and Tumak-3s have a rotatable mount which can be fitted with either the UKM-2000P 7.62 mm general-purpose machine gun or the NSW-B 12.7 mm heavy machine gun. Tumak-5s are used by anti-tank subunits and are armed with a dismountable Spike missile. Additionally Polish forces of ISAF operated 120 HMMWVs on loan from the U.S. forces.
- Switzerland – Early MOWAG Eagle light armored vehicles utilized the HMMWV chassis, although the latest uses a Duro III chassis. The Eagle is an NBC-tight, air-conditioned, and armor-protected vehicle. It is in service and available in several configurations with varying levels of armor protection. The Eagle can be fitted with a wide assortment of armaments.
- Turkey – Otokar Cobra – is a wheeled armoured vehicle developed by Turkish firm Otokar which uses some mechanical components, sub-systems and some parts of the HMMWV.

=== Survivable Combat Tactical Vehicle ===
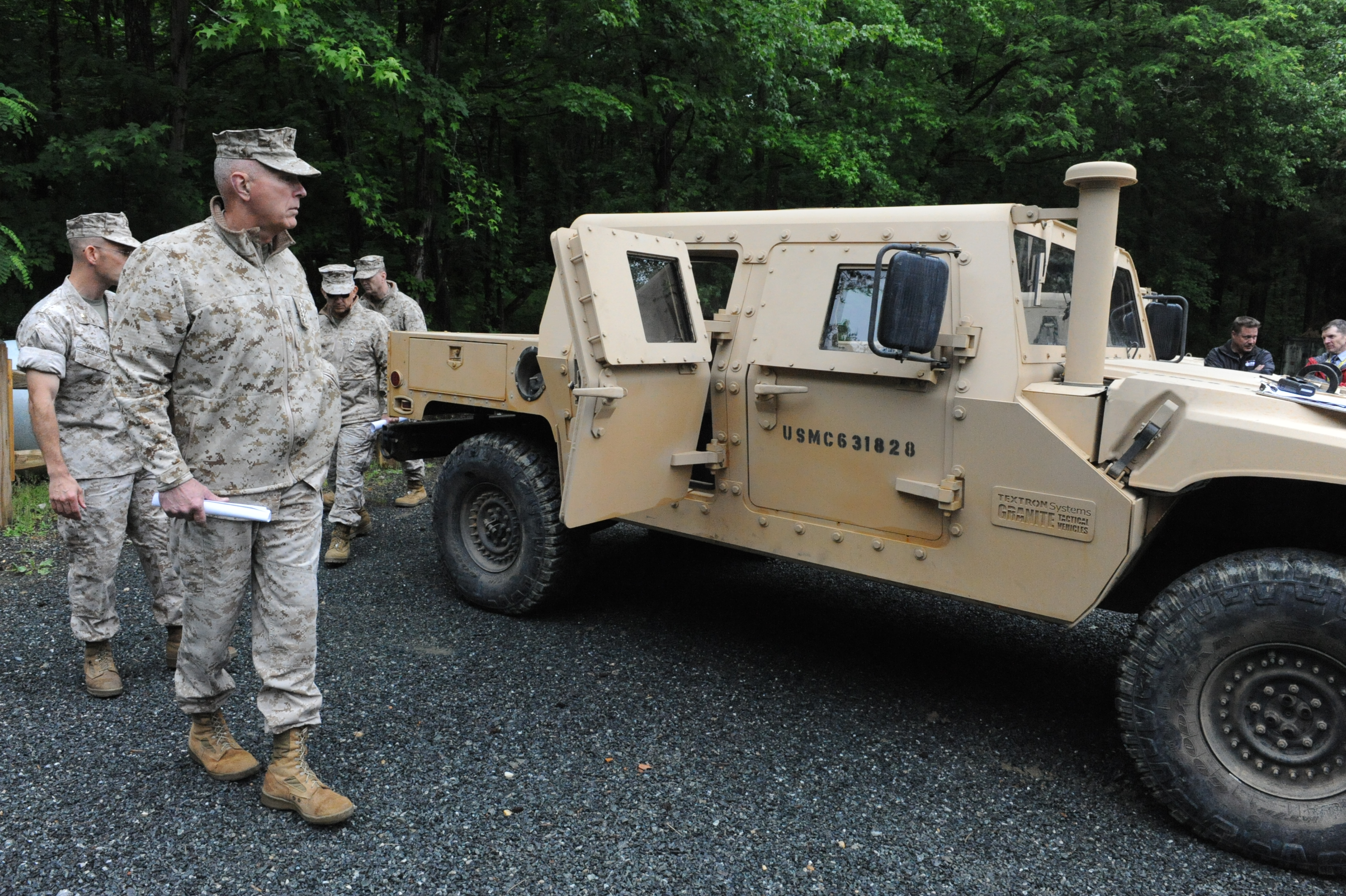
Marine Corps inspected SCTV Humvee, 2010

Textron's Survivable Combat Tactical Vehicle (SCTV) is a protective capsule that can increase Humvee survivability to MRAP levels while significantly improving mobility. The modifications come in five kits, but all five need to be installed before the vehicle can be properly called an SCTV. The vehicle features a monocoque V-shaped hull and angled sides to help deflect rocket-propelled grenades (RPGs) with scalable levels of protection. It has greater engine power, replacing the 6.5-liter diesel engine with a Cummins 6.7-liter diesel and Allison 6-speed transmission, as well as a stronger suspension, improved brakes, higher ground clearance, and new onboard instrumentation. Fuel capacity is increased from 27 to 40 US gal (100 to 150 L; 22 to 33 imp gal) and the battery and fuel cells are moved from under the rear seat to the rear of the vehicle. Also included are a powerful air conditioner and heating system, run-flat tires, a thermal guard liner under the roof, sharp edges removed from inside the cabin, blast attenuating seats, and a folding gunner's turret allowing rapid deployment from a cargo aircraft or shipboard below deck. Although heavier than the Humvee, the SCTV is half the weight and costs $150,000 less than a comparably survivable MRAP. The basic version is a four-passenger armament carrier, but it can be configured as a nine-passenger troop carrier, air-defense vehicle, flatbed cargo truck, or field ambulance depending on the type of Humvee it is converted from.

Work began on the SCTV in 2008 in anticipation of U.S. military upgrades, but it was shelved once they made the JLTV a priority. Textron then focused on selling the SCTV upgrade package to up to 25 countries operating the global fleet, a potential market of up to 10,000 vehicles. The upgrade can enhance the survivability of previously soft-skinned versions, sometimes sold by the U.S. as Excess Defense Articles, while costing and weighing less than a comparable MRAP. By 2015, Colombia had installed the SCTV into three Humvees for testing, and Ukraine had shown interest in upgrading their old-model Humvees recently supplied by the U.S. Ukraine ordered three SCTVs in February 2016.

== Operators ==
HMMWV operators

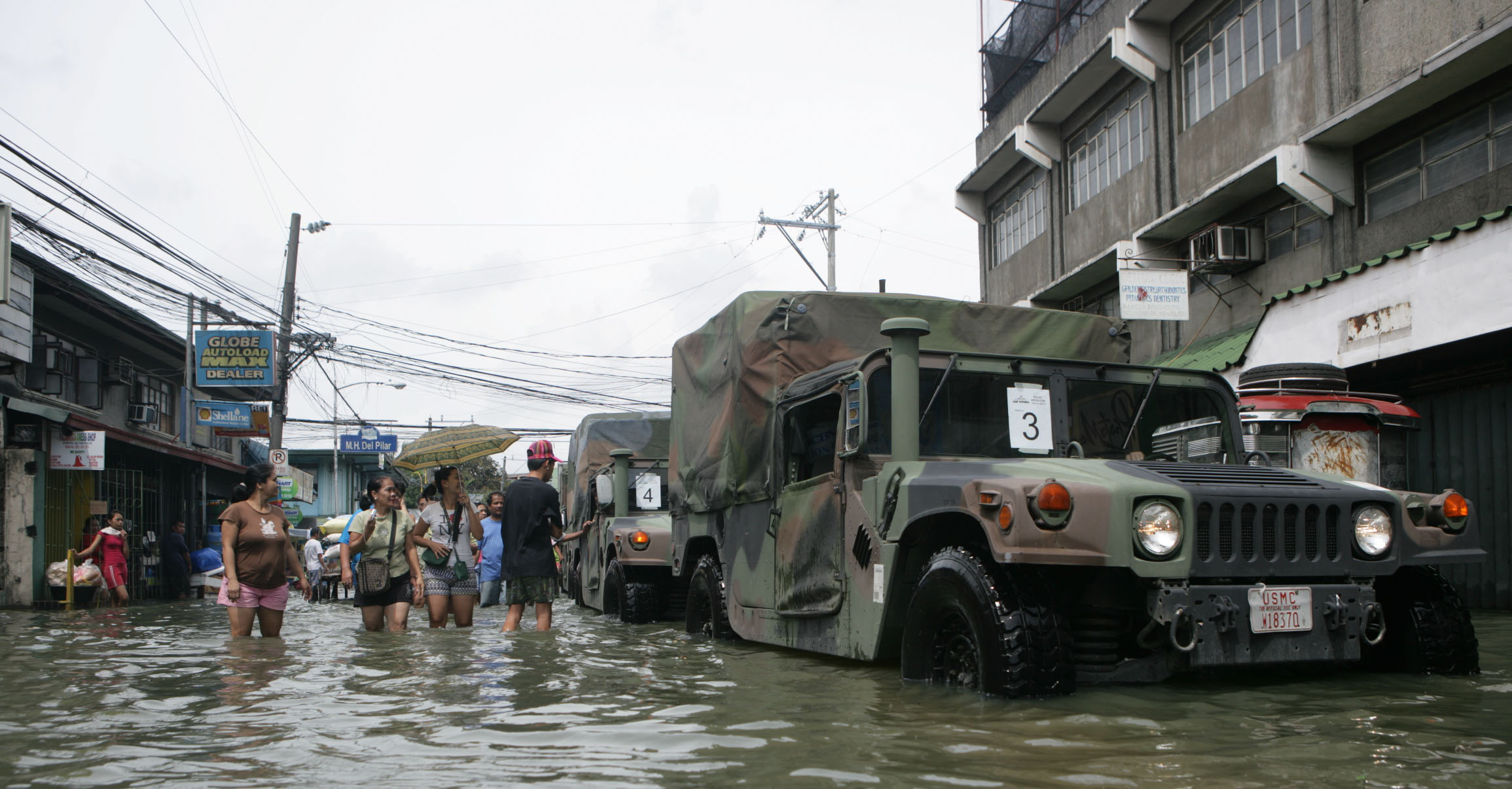
U.S. Marine Corps HMMWVs in the Philippines deliver food packs after Typhoon Ketsana, 2009

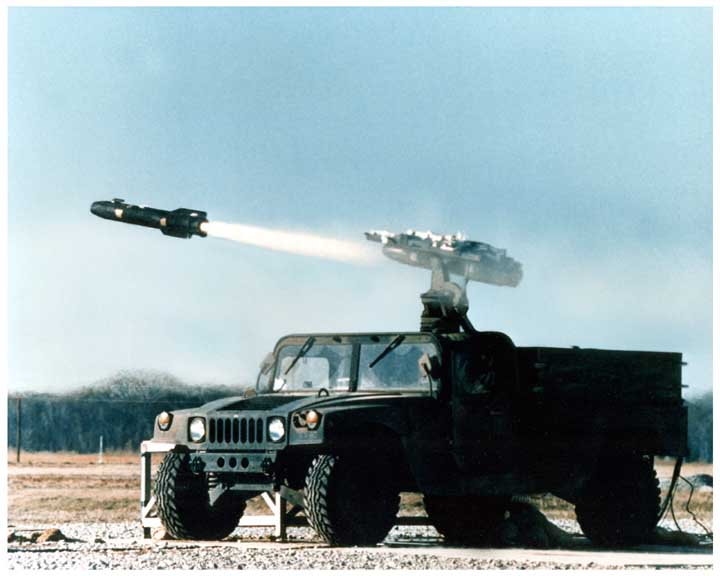
A HMMWV firing an AGM-114 Hellfire missile

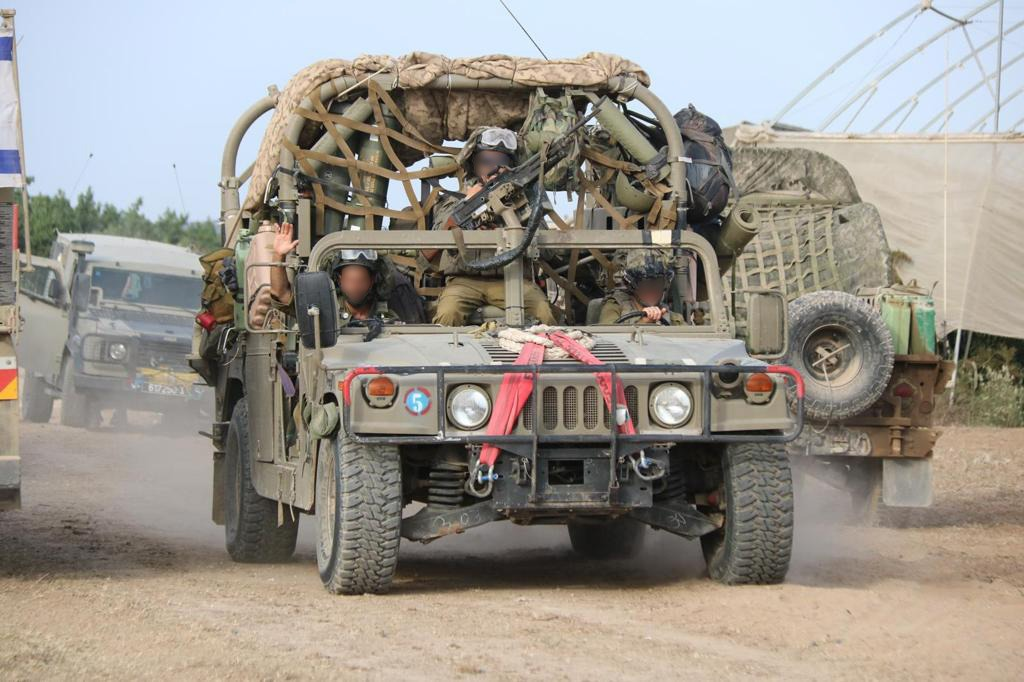
An Israeli Humvee during the beginning stages of the Gaza War in 2023

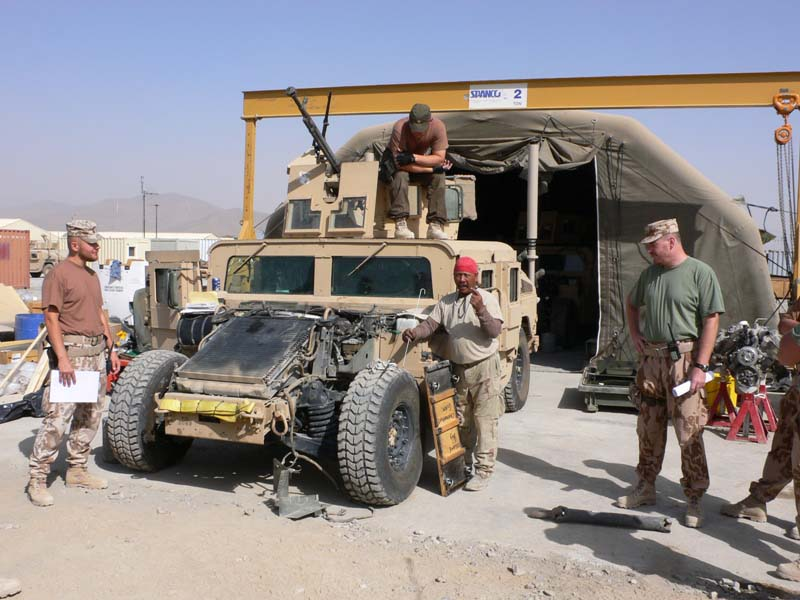
Humvee maintenance with engine exposed by Czech Army in Afghanistan

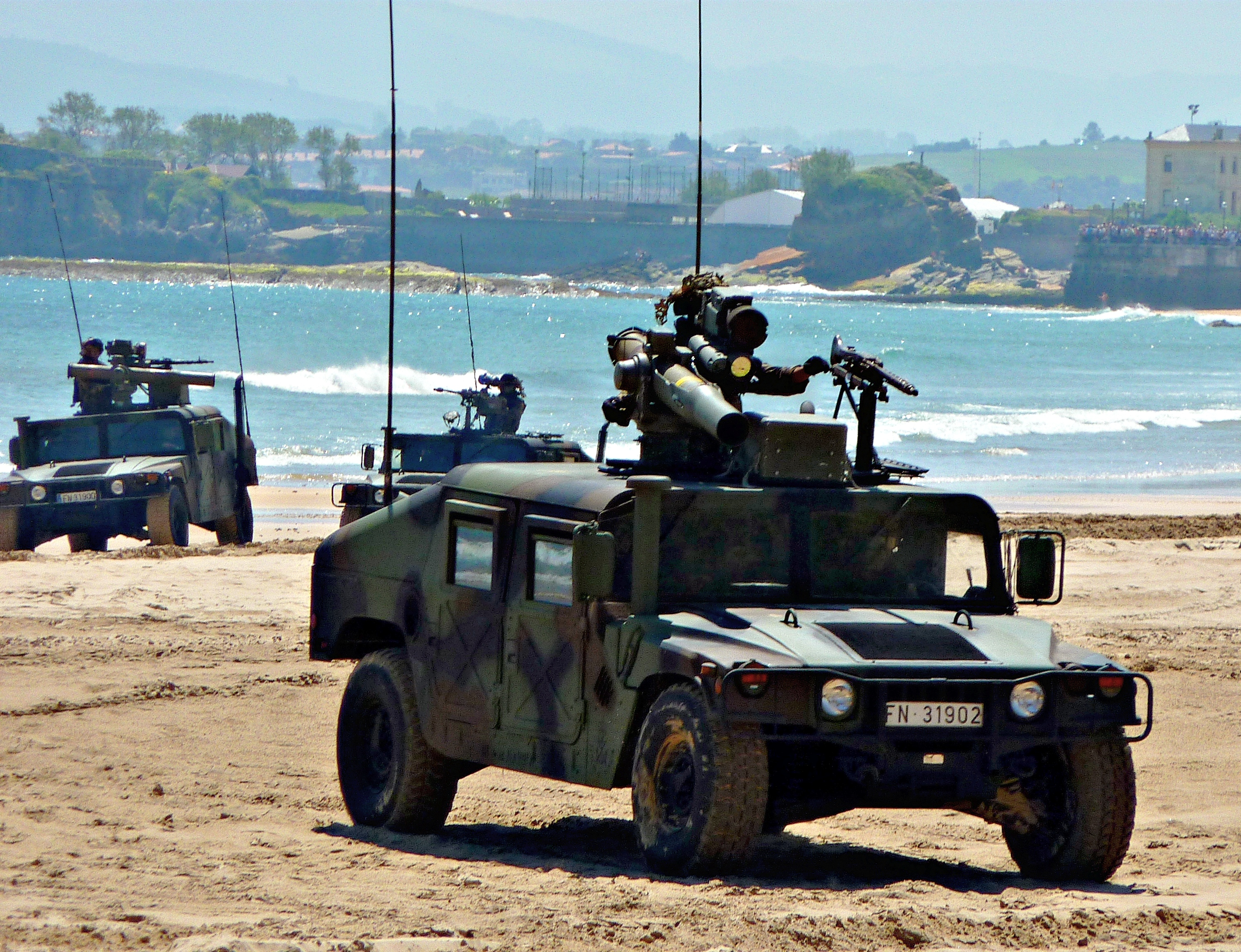
A Spanish Navy Marines M-966 equipped with BGM-71 TOW anti-tank missile

- Albania – 248 donated by US with deliveries beginning in 2017.
- Afghanistan: An unknown number, estimated in the hundreds, were captured by the Taliban in their 2021 offensive, and have been in use by the new government's Islamic Emirate Army.
- Algeria – HMMWV purchased.
- Argentina - 400+ in the Argentine Armed Forces.
- Azerbaijan – 100+ HMMWV use by Azerbaijani army and peacekeeping force.
- Bahrain – Vehicles sold under the U.S. Foreign Military Sales program.
- Bolivia
- Bosnia and Herzegovina – 25 in 2010 and 44 donated by the U.S. in 2017.
- Bulgaria – 52 vehicles, 50 are the up-armored M1114 variant, and two are ambulances.
- Canada – Small numbers (M1113 and M1117) in use by Joint Task Force 2 (JTF-2) and Special Operations Regiment (CSOR). Used in Afghanistan.
- Chad – Vehicles sold under the U.S. Foreign Military Sales program.
- Chile
- Colombia: 800 vehicles
- Croatia - 112 vehicles.
- Czech Republic – Borrowed from the US Military to conduct missions by the 601st Special Forces Group in Afghanistan.
- Denmark – 30 vehicles.
- Djibouti – Vehicles sold under the U.S. Foreign Military Sales program. They have seen combat in the 1990s during the FRUD rebellion.
- Ecuador
- Egypt
- Georgia
- Greece - 681 vehicles ≈276 built in Greece by ELVO with designations M1114GR to M1119GR.
- Honduras – Vehicles procured via the U.S. Foreign Military Sales program.
- Iran - 15 to 20 confiscated from Afghan forces that fled to Iran during the Fall of Kabul (2021)
- Iraq – During the Iraq War, stockpiled U.S. military HMMWVs were given to the Iraqi Army, Iraqi Security Forces. The Iraqi military has more than 10,000+ Humvees. Some of these have been captured by the Islamic State in 2014. Most of them were recaptured by the Iraqi Armed Forces after IS defeat in 2017.
- Israel
- Jordan – Multipurpose utility vehicle 600+ 250 M998A0 HMMWVs, 50 M1165A1B3 HMMWVs received from the US in 2013.
- Kazakhstan
- Kosovo
- Kenya – Several vehicles in use by security forces.
- Kuwait – Vehicles sold via the U.S. Foreign Military Sales program.
- Lebanon – 1,300+ vehicles
- Libya – 200 donated by the U.S. Army in July 2013.
- Lithuania – 200 vehicles
- North Macedonia – 10 to 90, modified at Eurokompozit, armed with PK 7.62 x 54R MG
- Morocco – Morocco has 4000+ vehicles in the Royal Moroccan Army, some of them are fitted with BGM-71 TOW ATGM.
- Moldova – 90 vehicles
- Mexico – Vehicles sold via the U.S. Foreign Military Sales program. 3,000 vehicles in service.
- New Zealand – Borrowed U.S. vehicles in Afghanistan were modified by New Zealand Special Air Service and replaced by Pinzgauer. The Army used a small number of U.S. either free/leased vehicles in Afghanistan until 2013.
- Norway - In use as a Missile Support Platform for the Norwegian Advanced Surface-to-Air Missile System (NASAMS).
- Oman – Vehicles sold via the U.S. Foreign Military Sales program.
- Paraguay - 30 vehicles donated by Taiwan.
- Peru – 34 vehicles (12 M-1151A1 deployed in Haiti as part of the UN peacekeeping contingent, 22 M-1165A1 Special Ops operated by the 19th Commando Battalion). There is possibly an upcoming purchase of 100 additional vehicles.
- Philippines – 300+ vehicles M1114 delivered in 2013.
- Poland
- Portugal – 47 vehicles used by Portuguese Army and 3 by the Portuguese Air Force.
- Romania – 322 of M1113/M1114/M1165/M1151 variants
- Saudi Arabia – Vehicles were sold to Saudi Arabia by the U.S. under the Foreign Military Sales program.
- Senegal – 23 vehicles donated by the U.S. seen in action as recently as 2017.
- Spain – 123 vehicles, used by the Infantería de Marina.
- Serbia – 186 vehicles (106 Army); 50 vehicles special forces units; 30 vehicles (Gendarmery).
- Slovakia – Slovak Armed Forces used 6 vehicles in Iraq.
- Slovenia – 4 donated by U.S. and 1 purchased in 2020.
- Sudan – Vehicles sold by the U.S. under the Foreign Military Sales program.
- Syria – Captured from ISIS and Syrian Democratic Forces.
- Taiwan (Republic of China) – 9,000+ vehicles including vehicles sold via the U.S. Foreign Military Sales program.
- Tajikistan - An unknown number of M1152A1 HMMWV "Gun trucks" were obtained by the Tajik Border Guards from fleeing ANA soldiers after the Taliban reestablished itself.
- Tanzania – sold by the U.S. under the Foreign Military Sales program.
- Tunisia – 500+ operating in the Tunisian armed forces, some units are equipped with the BGM-71 TOW and the Mk 19.
- 52 vehicles donated by the U.S. in May 2015 and some sold via the U.S. Foreign Military Sales program.
- Ukraine – 4000+ vehicles. 342 transferred (before 24 April 2022) of М1097А2/М1114/М998/M1152/М1116/M1025/HMMWV variants. Out of all vehicles around 110 are at the 95th Airmobile Brigade, 10 vehicles were donated to the Polish–Ukrainian Peace Force Battalion (POLUKRBAT). Reports say that after the Battle of Debaltseve insurgents were seen driving around in 'Humvee-like' vehicles. Over 2000 vehicles were sent by the United States following the 2022 Russian invasion of Ukraine.
- United States – 230,000 (US Army and US Marine Corps) Some used by various law enforcement agencies purchased through civilian sales.
  - US Army estimated 1,000 M1167 HMMWV TOW as of January 2025
- Uganda
- Yemen – M1123 and M1151 variants

=== Former user ===
- Afghanistan: The former Islamic Republic of Afghanistan ordered 3,334 more in 2010 and 2011 for its National Police, National Army and other military. 950 M1114 vehicles delivered to the army by November 2012. Others were taken by surviving Afghan troops who joined up with the National Resistance Front.

=== Non-state actors ===
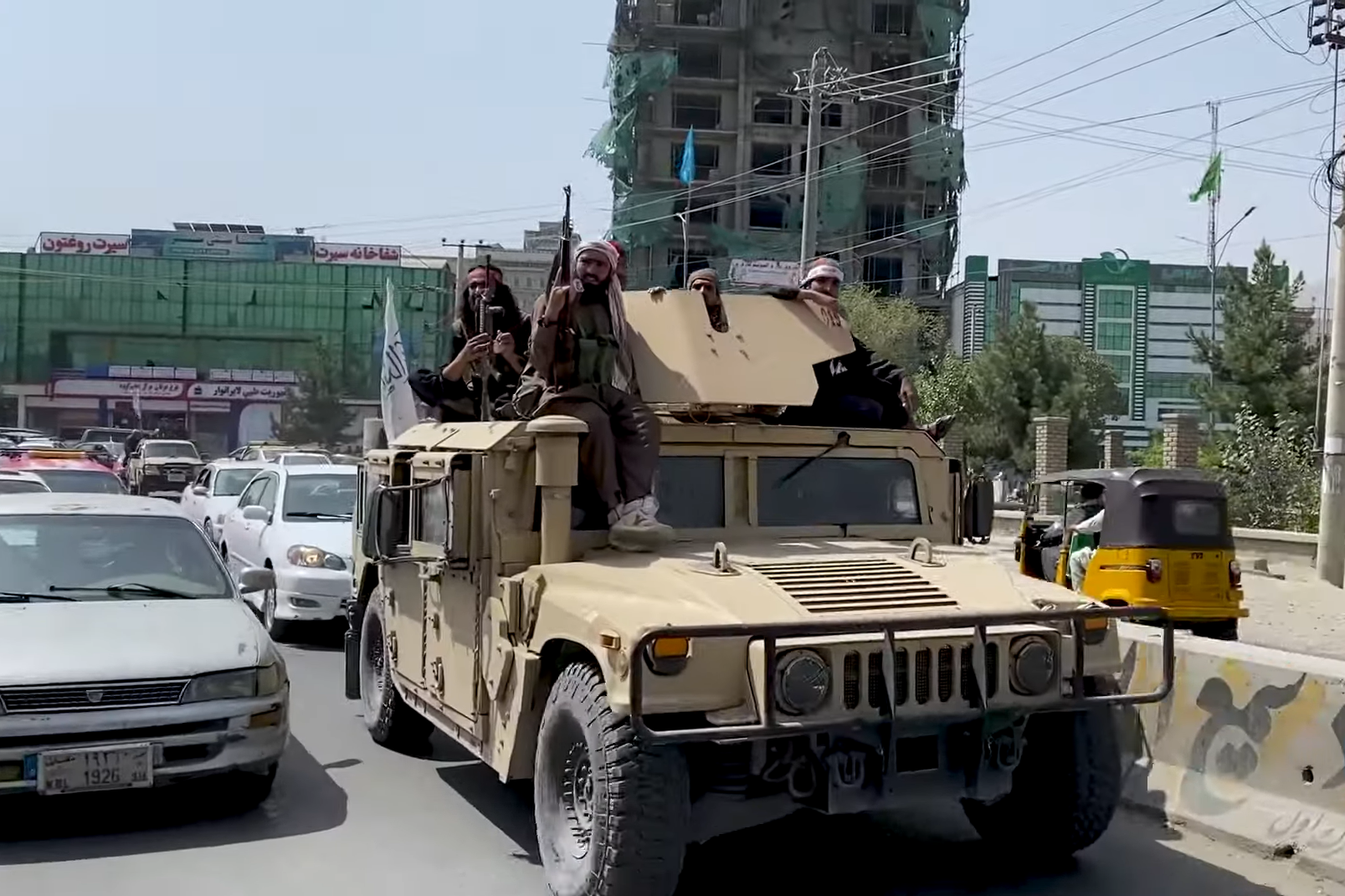
A Humvee captured by the Taliban in 2021

- Islamic State – 2,300 (captured)
- Kataib Hezbollah
- Syrian Democratic Forces: Equipped with at least 20 Humvees from 2017 with further details not revealed.
  - People's Defense Units

=== Civilian sales ===
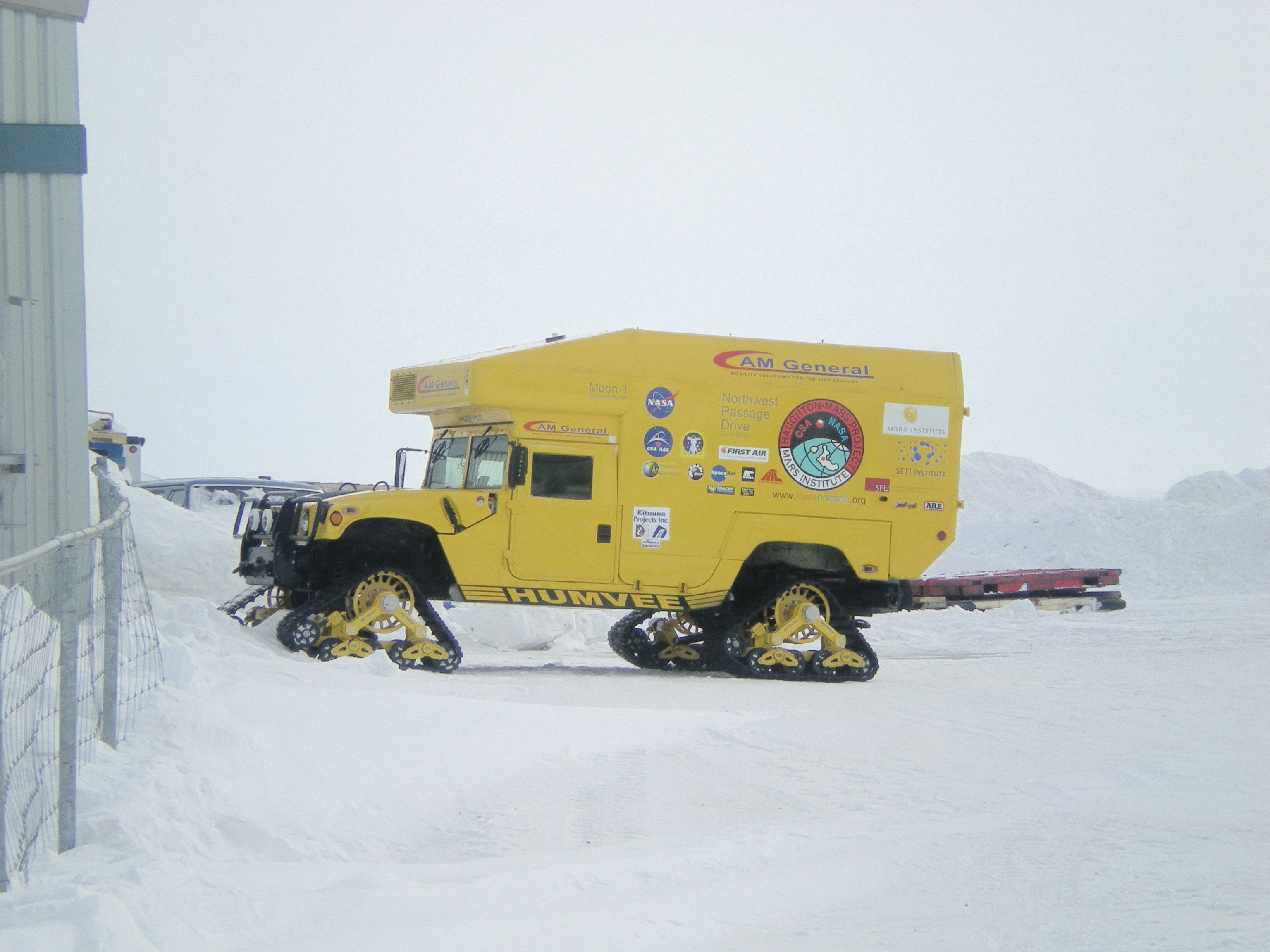
The Mars Institute's Moon-1 HMMWV Rover waits for C-130 airlift at Cambridge Bay, Canada in 2009

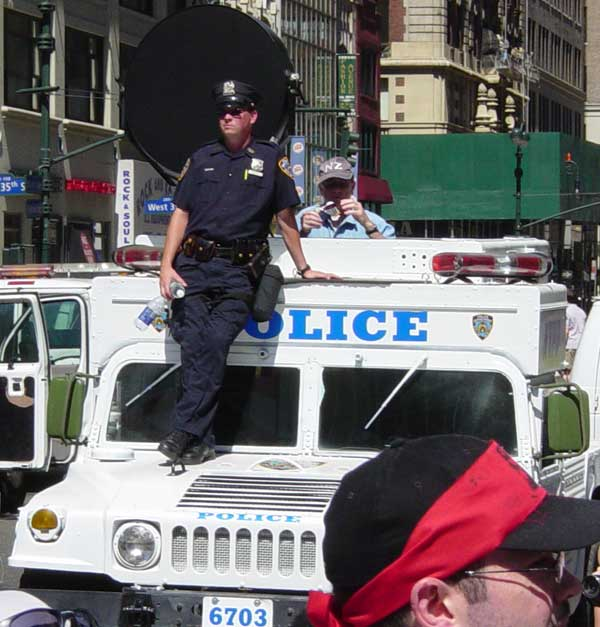
An NYPD HMMWV equipped with LRAD

In December 2014, the Department of Defense began auctioning off some 4,000 used Humvees to the public. While some have been transferred to domestic law enforcement agencies, this is the first time the military vehicles have been made available for civilian ownership. The idea is to sell them with starting bids at $10,000 each, rather than simply scrapping them as a way to save money and repurpose them. M998, M998A1, M1038, and M1038A1 model Humvees are available, which are out of U.S. service and lack armor. AM General has been opposed to the resale of military Humvees to the general public, primarily because surplus government vehicles would have cut into sales related to the civilian Hummer model, whose production ended in 2010. The first sales from auction occurred on 17 December 2014 for 25 of the Humvees. Bids ranged from $21,500 for a 1989 M1038 to $41,000 for a 1994 AM General M998A1. The average bid was around $30,000 and the sale of the 25 vehicles netted $744,000 total. GovPlanet has since taken over the contract and sells Humvees at its weekly online auctions.

==== HUMVEE C-Series ====
In 2017, it was announced that AM General signed a contract with VLF Automotive to build a new civilian version of the HMMWV for sale outside of the US. The initial contract calls for up to 100 a year to be built and sold overseas to places such as China, Europe, Middle East, and Australia. These are essentially updated Hummer H1s, but cannot use the Hummer-brand owned by General Motors. These vehicles have not been approved for sale in the US due to safety or emission standards.

== Replicas ==
Kits have been produced for the general market to turn a sedan into a Humvee lookalike. An alternative is to buy a preconstructed (or "turnkey") model. Various kits exist, but one of the more well known is the Volkswagen Beetle-based "Wombat". This was previously named "HummBug", until the threat of a lawsuit from General Motors forced changes to the name and the grille design to make it look less like the real thing.

In Australia, a Gold Coast-based company called Rhino Buggies produces replicas of the Hummer H1 based on the Nissan Patrol 4WD vehicle for around A$30,000.

In the U.S., four companies offered Hummer-look-alike body kits that can be mated to GM full-size trucks and Suburban chassis and, in some cases, Ford, Dodge, and Cadillac applications. Some models are Urban Gorilla, Endeavor SB400 and SB4x400 from Forever Off-Road, the Jurassic Truck Corporation T-Rex, and the Bummer from Tatonka Products. An additional company offers plans for chassis building. The kits range from two-door fiberglass models to steel tube and sheet metal constructions.

== Similar vehicles ==
- Agrale Marruá – Brazil
- BJ2022 – Chinese military vehicle, currently in service
- Dongfeng EQ2050 – Chinese military vehicle
- FMC XR311 – an early prototype, as the successor to the M151 jeep, that led to the HMMWV
- Mohafiz ASV - HIT made Armoured security vehicle of Pakistani origin.
- GAZ Tigr – Russian military vehicle, currently in service
- Hawkei – Australian military vehicle
- Iveco LMV – Italian military vehicle
- Komatsu LAV – Japanese military vehicle
- Lamborghini Cheetah, an Italian prototype contender for the original HMMWV contract. Forerunner of the "Rambo Lambo" Lamborghini LM002.
- TATA LSV (Light Specialist Vehicle) – a new vehicle by Tata Motors of India.
- Mahindra Marksman, Mahindra Rakshak and Mahindra Armored Light Specialist Vehicle – vehicles manufactured by Mahindra in India for operating in similar roles like the HUMVEE.
- Kia KLTV - South Korean light tactical vehicle
- Marine Multi-purpose Vehicle (MMPV) – Philippines
- MOWAG Eagle – Swiss military vehicle
- Otokar Cobra – Turkish light armored vehicle with HMMWV parts
- Oshkosh L-ATV – U.S. military vehicle
- Pindad Komodo – Indonesian military vehicle
- Predator SOV
- SPECTRE light vehicle – U.S. light air-portable utility/special forces-type vehicle proposed as a possible HMMWV replacement.
- T-98 Kombat – Russian civilian SUV
- Tarpan Honker – Polish military vehicle
- Tiuna – Venezuelan military vehicle
- Toyota Mega Cruiser – Japanese military vehicle in service with the Japan Self Defense Forces. AKA "Koukidousha" or "High Mobility Vehicle".
- URO VAMTAC – Spanish four-wheel tactical military vehicle by UROVESA
- VECTOR - Dutch tactical military vehicle
- VLEGA Gaucho – Argentinian-Brazilian military vehicle
- Weststar GK-M1 – Malaysian military light vehicle
- Kozak – Ukrainian military vehicle

== See also ==
- Hummer H1, H2, and H3. The H1 is a civilian derivative of the HMMWV, while the H2 and H3 are based on regular GM truck chassis and styled after it.
- Humvee clone manufacturing in China
- Humvee replacement process
- Interim Fast Attack Vehicle
- List of "M" series military vehicles
- Sandstorm, an HMMWV modified into an autonomous vehicle.
