= Joint Light Tactical Vehicle program =

U.S. Army effort to partially replace Humvees

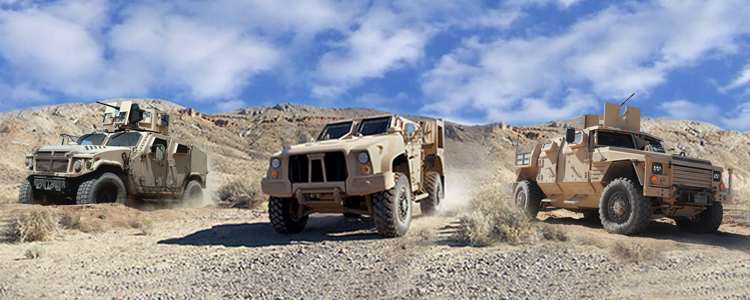
The three contenders in the final phase of the JLTV program. Left to right: AM General BRV-O, Oshkosh L-ATV and Lockheed Martin JLTV

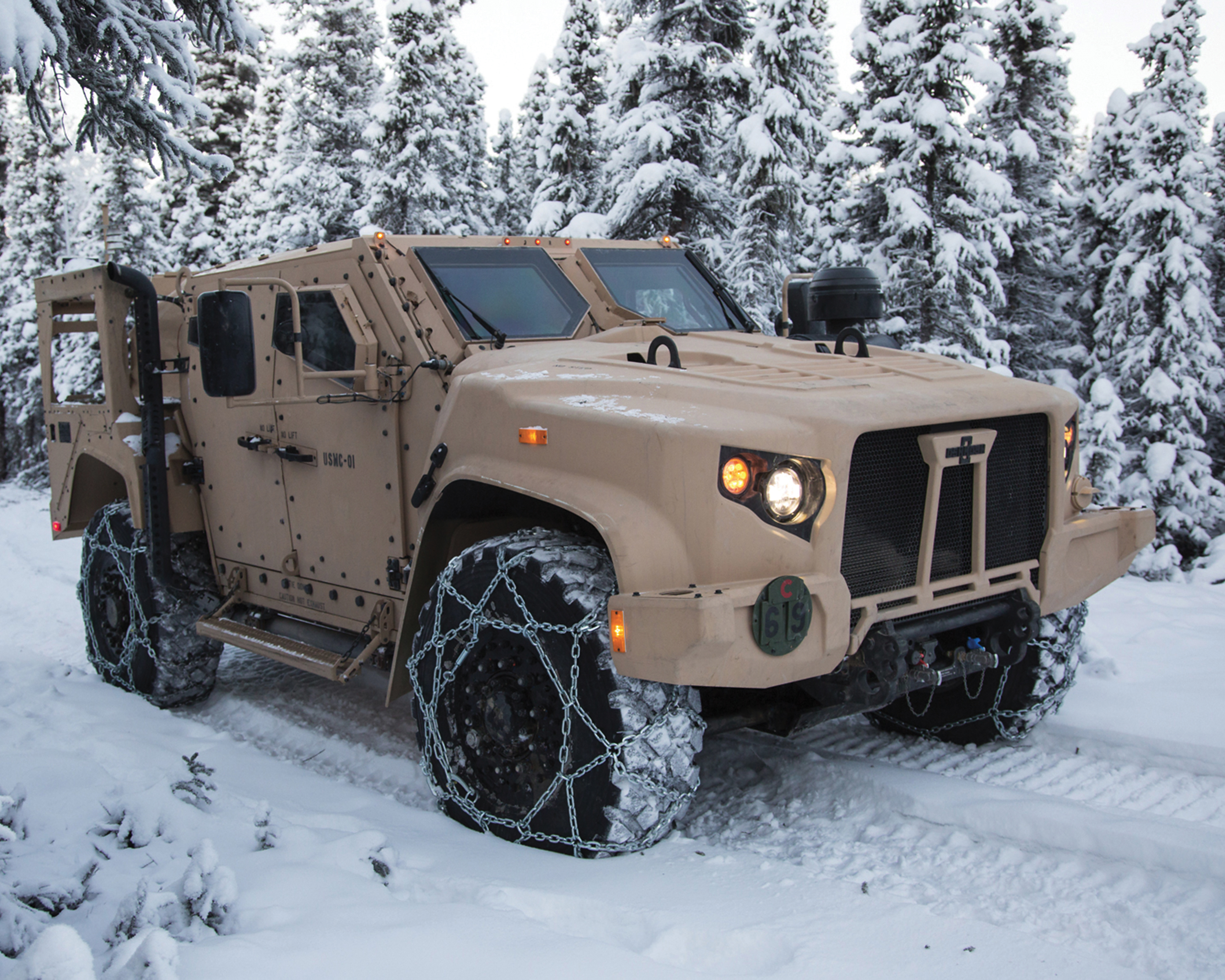
A production standard Oshkosh JLTV, the Oshkosh L-ATV, in USMC M1280 General Purpose (GP) configuration, fitted with deep fording kit, and tire chains

The Joint Light Tactical Vehicle (JLTV) program was a U.S. Army, U.S. Marine Corps and Special Operations Command competition to select a vehicle to partially replace the Humvee fleet with a family of more survivable vehicles having a greater payload. Early studies for the JLTV program were approved in 2006. The JLTV program incorporates lessons learned from the earlier Future Tactical Truck Systems program and other associated efforts.

The JLTV program has evolved considerably throughout various development phases and milestones including required numbers and pricing. Variants are capable of performing armament carrier, utility, command and control (shelter), ambulance, reconnaissance and a variety of other tactical and logistic support roles. JLTV follows the U.S. Army's Long Term Armor Strategy with kits for two levels of armor protection. Oshkosh's L-ATV was selected as the winner of the JLTV program in August 2015 and awarded an initial production contract for up to 16,901 JLTVs. The U.S. Army approved the JLTV for full-rate production in June 2019.

== Development ==
The High Mobility Multipurpose Wheeled Vehicle (HMMWV or Humvee), which first entered service in 1985, was developed during the Cold War when improvised explosive devices (IEDs) and asymmetric warfare were not a major factor for military planners. The HMMWVs demonstrated vulnerability to IEDs, and the difficulties and costs experienced in satisfactorily up-armoring HMMWVs led to the development of a family of more survivable vehicles with greater payload and mobility. JLTV was originally reported as a one-for-one HMMWV replacement; however, US Department of Defense (DoD) officials now emphasize that JLTVs are not intended to replace all HMMWVs.

The JLTV publicly emerged in 2006. Early government documents note: "In response to an operational need and an aging fleet of light tactical wheeled vehicles, the joint services have developed a requirement for a new tactical wheeled vehicle platform that will provide increased force protection, survivability, and improved capacity over the current [Up-armored Humvee] while balancing mobility and transportability requirements with total ownership costs." The joint service nature of the effort was assured through Congressional language in the Fiscal Year 2006 (FY06) Authorization Act, which mandated that any future tactical wheeled vehicle program would be a joint program.

The Joint Chief of Staff's Joint Requirements Oversight Council approved the JLTV program in November 2006; this began a 13-month Concept Refinement phase which is a pre-systems acquisition process designed to further develop the initial concepts resident in the Initial Capabilities Document. The Concept Refinement phase also includes an Analysis of Alternatives. At the conclusion of the Concept Refinement phase in December 2007, the Joint Program Office JLTV project manager intended to transition the program directly into the engineering, manufacturing, and development phase.

As the milestone approached, it became clear that the under secretary of defense for acquisition and sustainment John Young would not support the JLTV program entering into the acquisition process at that time. He denied the request and instructed the Army and the Marine Corps to develop a more vigorous Technology Development (TD) phase.

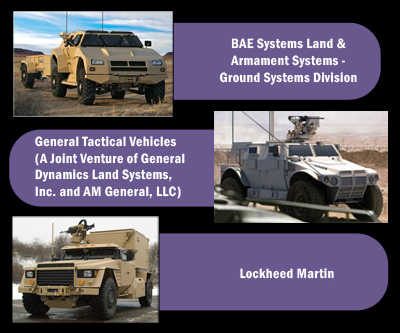
JLTV competitors and initial designs, updated as of 2010

The DoD released a request for proposal (RFP) for the TD phase of the JLTV program on 5 February 2008. Industry proposals were due 7 April. TD phase contract award was postponed in July 2008. The following companies and partnerships responded to the TD phase RFP:

- Boeing, Textron and Millenworks
- General Dynamics and AM General (as "General Tactical Vehicles")
- Force Protection Inc and DRS Technologies (officially rejected in August 2008)
- BAE Systems and Navistar
- Northrop Grumman, Oshkosh Truck and Plasan
- Lockheed Martin, BAE Systems Land & Armaments Global Tactical Systems, Alcoa Defense and JWF Industries
- Blackwater and Raytheon

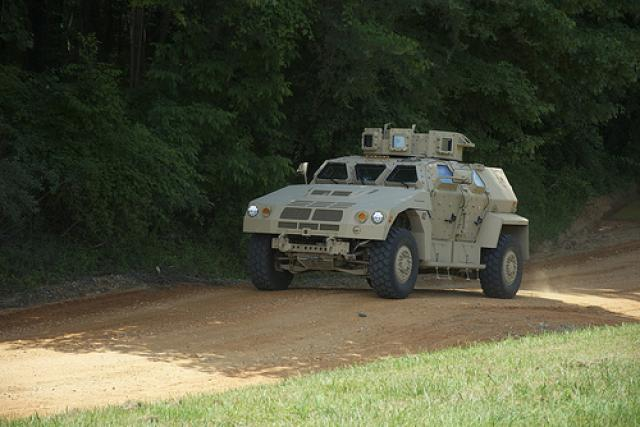
A BAE Systems Valanx JLTV in 2012. BAE's Valanx did not progress to the EMD phase.

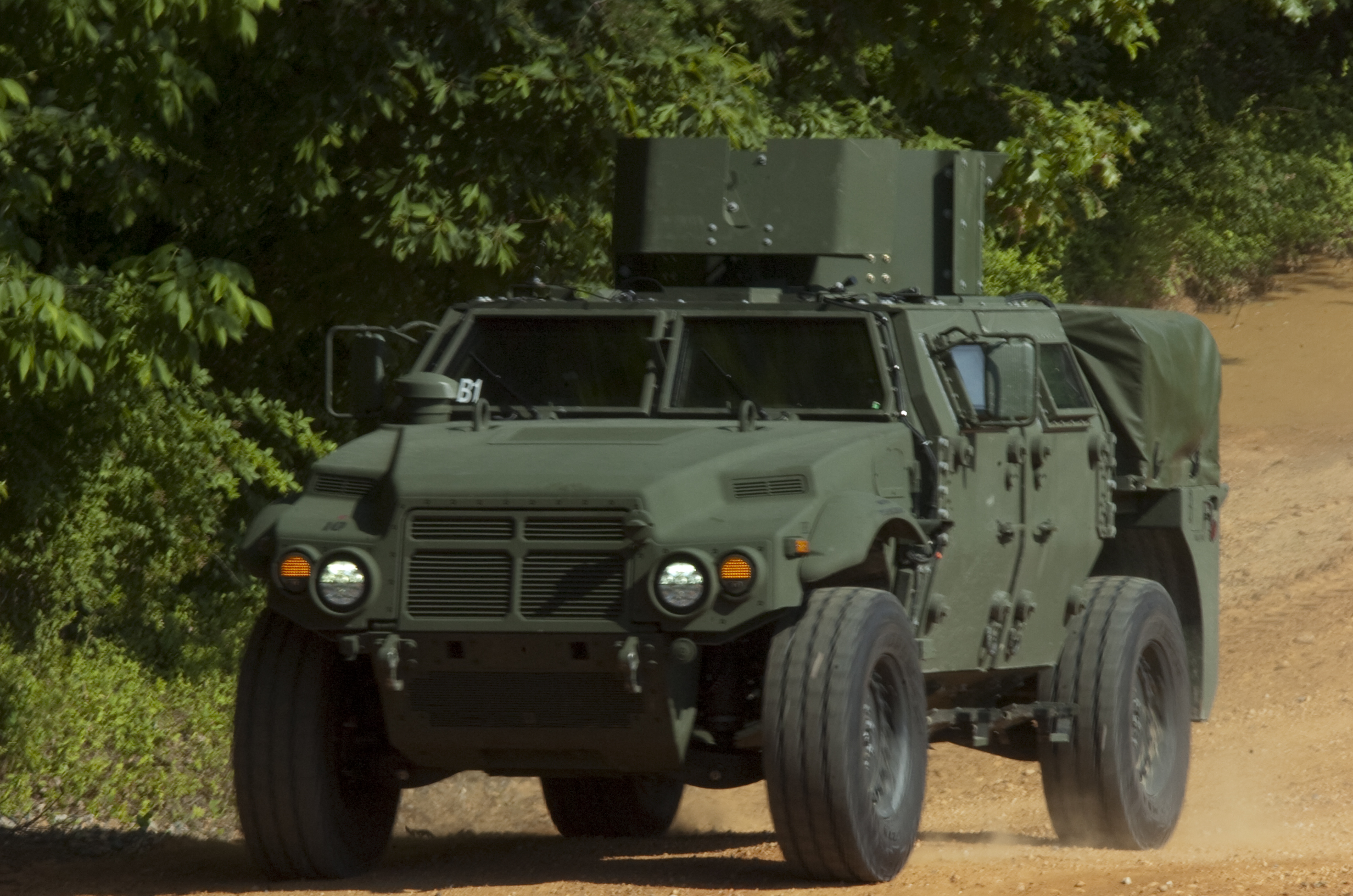
A General Tactical Vehicles JLTV during field trials in 2010. This design did not progress to the EMD phase.

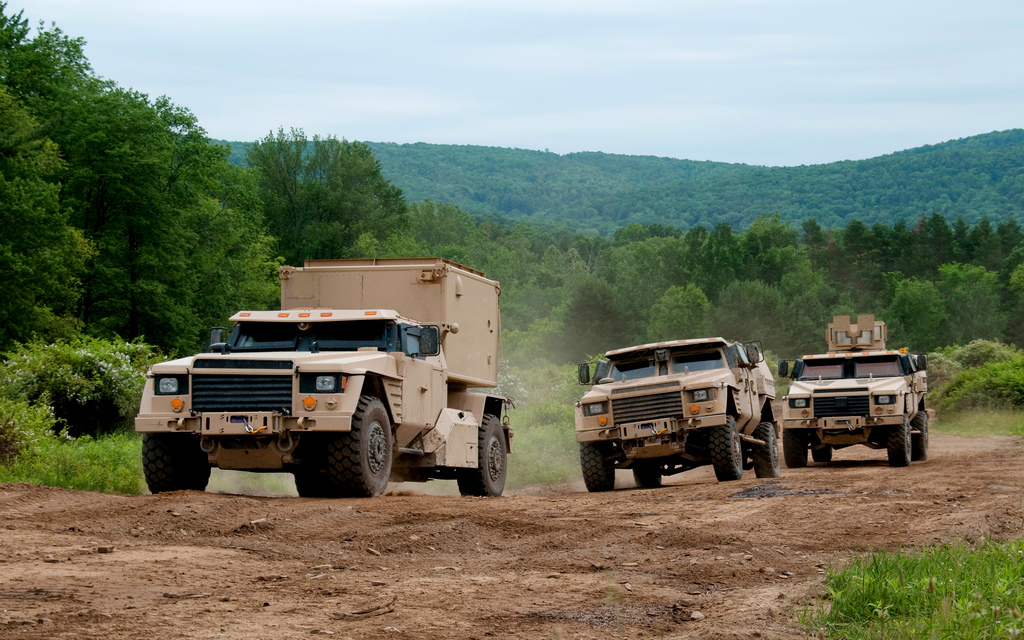
Lockheed Martin JLTV variants in 2012. Lockheed Martin's vehicle progressed to the EMD phase and was selected to progress to the prototype stage.

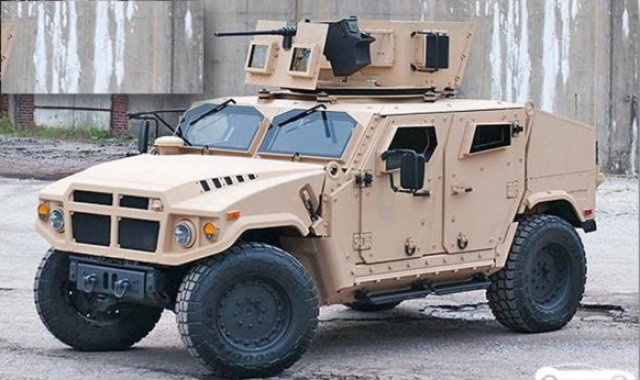
A AM General BRV-O JLTV on static display. The BRV-O progressed to the EMD phase and was selected to progress to the prototype stage.

In October 2008, the Pentagon narrowed the field of vendors to Lockheed Martin, General Tactical Vehicles and BAE Systems/Navistar. Each team was awarded contracts worth between $35.9 million and $45 million to begin the next phase of the program, which at the time was stated to be worth $20 billion or more. The Northrop Grumman/Oshkosh group contested the awards, but their protest was denied by the Government Accountability Office.

In June 2010, it was confirmed that all three contractors had delivered seven JLTV platforms for TD phase evaluation. The U.S. Army appeared to have reduced its support for the program at this time, omitting JLTV numbers from its tactical vehicle strategy published in June 2010. However, the U.S. Army clarified that JLTVs are slated to both replace and complement the Humvee.

JLTV's TD phase was completed in May 2011. In February 2011, the JLTV Program Office announced the award of the follow-on Engineering and Manufacturing Development phase contract would be delayed until January or February 2012 because the Army changed requirements for the JLTV, requiring it to have the same level of under-body protection as the Oshkosh M-ATV. Updated specifications for the program included reducing the payload options to the Combat Tactical Vehicle (CTV) configuration, which would be a 4-seat vehicle with a 3,500 pound payload, and the Combat Support Vehicle (CSV), which would be a 2-seat vehicle with a 5,100-pound payload.

=== Engineering and Manufacturing Development phase ===
The draft RFP for the Engineering and Manufacturing Development (EMD) phase was released in October 2011. It called for an average unit manufacturing cost between $230,000 and $270,000 across the JLTV family of vehicles. The cost target for the B-kit armor package remains at US$65,000. The EMD phase requirements created some trade space for industry by easing weight and mobility constraints. At this time JLTV was in danger of severe budget cuts and possible cancellation in the wake of spiraling costs, delays, and defense-wide budgetary cutbacks. It was also competing against the HMMWV Modernized Expanded Capacity Vehicle (MECV) program, the draft RFP for which was released in August 2011.

In January 2012 the request for proposals for JLTV's EMD phase was released. Budget priorities for FY13 released on the same day included the termination of the HMMWV MECV program in order to focus vehicle modernization resources on the JLTV. Not all of the TD phase contract award teams remained in place for the EMD phase. By late March 2012, at least six teams had submitted responses to the EMD phase RFP, and following EMD phase contract awards in August 2012, in September Hardwire LLC disclosed itself as a previously unknown seventh bidder. The bidders were:

- AM General (still at the time teamed with GTV for a separate offering) offered the Blast-Resistant Vehicle – Off Road (BRV-O), a product based on its own R&D, and a design that leveraged some of AM General's then-recent experience with HMMWV MECV designs.
- BAE Systems (previously teamed with Navistar) realigned its team for the EMD phase to include Ford (Ford Motor Company's Power Stroke 6.7 liter turbocharged diesel engine; Ford had been considering participating in the JLTV's EMD competition with its own offering) and proposed a design that capitalized on earlier TD phase work with the Valanx.
- GTV dropped its TD phase developed design and opted to offer a lowest risk solution, a further development of the in-production MOWAG Eagle.
- Lockheed Martin opted to stay with its TD phase offering, albeit a version that according to the company was "hundreds of pounds lighter in weight."
- Navistar, which broke away from BAE Systems for the EMD phase, offered a variant of its Saratoga light tactical vehicle, this unveiled in October 2011 as a middle-ground offering between the HMMWV and JLTV, the latter with its then current TD phase spec still technically in place.
- Oshkosh proposed a variant of the company's L-ATV, unveiled in October 2011. L-ATV has developmental origins that trace back to Oshkosh/Northrop-Grumman's failed initial JLTV proposal.
- Hardwire offered a proposal featuring a hybrid-electric drive train. Hardwire's armor has been employed on MRAP vehicles, and the company is known for developing a "blast chimney" that it designed to provide an outlet for energy released in an underbelly blast.

On 23 August 2012, the Army and Marine Corps selected the Lockheed Martin JLTV, the Oshkosh L-ATV, and the AM General BRV-O as the winners of the EMD phase of the competition. The three companies were awarded a contract to build 22 prototype vehicles in 27 months to be judged by the services. Losing bidder Navistar filed a protest with the Government Accountability Office over the evaluation criteria later that month; the company withdrew the protest in September 2012.

On 27 August 2013, the Army and Marine Corps announced that full-scale testing of JLTV prototypes would begin the following week. Each company delivered 22 vehicles and six trailers to Aberdeen Proving Ground, Maryland, and Yuma Proving Ground, Arizona. Previous testing had already put the vehicles through more than 400 ballistic and blast tests on armor testing samples, underbody blast testing, and more than 1,000 miles in shakedown testing. Soldiers from the Army Test and Evaluation Command and personnel from the Defense Department's Office of Test and Evaluation put the vehicles through realistic and rigorous field testing during 14 months of government performance testing. Testing was to be completed by FY 2015, with a production contract to be awarded to a single vendor for nearly 55,000 vehicles. In September 2013, full-pace, full-scope JLTV testing began at Aberdeen Proving Ground, Yuma Proving Ground, and Redstone Arsenal, Alabama.

On 1 October 2013, the Defense Department Inspector General launched a year-long audit of the JLTV program. It was one of about a dozen acquisition programs outlined in the FY 2014 "audit plan". The audit was to determine whether Army and Marine Corps officials were overseeing and managing the program effectively before low-rate production began. A June 2013 report by the Congressional Research Service estimates the program cost at $23 billion, or $400,000 per vehicle; military leaders contend the unit cost at $250,000.

The Army planned to issue a RFP to companies interested in bidding for production contracts in mid-November 2014 and to pick a winner possibly by July 2015. Discrepancies in unit cost have been attributed to different methods for analyzing cost. The Inspector General report concludes program officials "appropriately assessed the affordability" of the effort, and that average unit production cost remains stable at $250,000. All three vehicles completed limited user testing and production readiness reviews by mid-November 2014.

The Army released the final JLTV RFP for low rate initial production (LRIP) and full rate production (FRP) in December 2014, clearing the way for AM General, Lockheed Martin, and Oshkosh Defense to submit their vehicle proposals. The Army gave competitors until 10 February 2015, to refine and submit their bids. The Army, on behalf of itself and the Marines, stated plans to select a winner and issue a single contract award in the late summer of 2015.

The winning contractor would build approximately 17,000 JLTVs for the Army and Marine Corps during three years of LRIP, followed by five years of FRP. The first Army unit would be equipped with JLTVs in FY2018, and the Army's complete acquisition of 49,099 JLTVs would be completed in 2040, with 2,200 JLTVs delivered each year between 2020 and 2036. The Marine Corps would begin acquiring their 5,500 JLTVs at the beginning of production and would be completed by FY 2022.

FY 2015 budget requests included 176 JLTV for the Army and 7 JLTV for the Marine Corps in various configurations. The total procurement cost of the JLTV program was quoted as US$30.04 billion and US$0.98 billion in research and development funds, giving a total estimated program cost of US$31.03 billion (figures are aggregated annual funds spent over the life of the program with no price/inflation adjustment).

=== Contract award ===
Oshkosh was selected for production in August 2015. The award included a base contract and eight option years covering two years of LRIP (revised from three) and five years of FRP. The initial contract award was valued at US$114 million, with LRIP slated to begin in the first quarter of FY 2016, and with Oshkosh commencing delivery of vehicles approximately 10 months after contract award. The JLTV contract award had a value of up to US$6.749 billion and called for a maximum of 16,901 JLTVs and includes a sustainment element. JLTV manufacturing is performed in Oshkosh, Wisconsin. Around contract award, Oshkosh CEO Charles Szews said the production contract award would involve more than 300 suppliers in 31 states across the country.

In September 2015, Lockheed Martin formally protested the award. Any work that would be performed under the contract stopped during the review period. In December 2015 the Government Accountability Office (GAO) dismissed Lockheed Martin's protest because the company in December 2015 decided to file a "Notice of Post-Award Bid Protest" with the U.S. Court of Federal Claims.

Immediately after the GAO dismissed the protest, the Army instructed Oshkosh to resume work on the JLTV order. Lockheed Martin filed a preliminary injunction in December, stating that new Army-supplied information related to the contract emerged toward the end of the GAO's protest process that was not considered before their ruling and no deadline extension was granted. The U.S. Court of Federal Claims denied Lockheed Martin's request to stop work while the lawsuit was pending, allowing Oshkosh to continue work during the process. The company withdrew its protest in the Court of Federal Claims in February 2016.

Around the time Lockheed Martin withdrew its protest, some potentially crucial data from JLTV testing was revealed. The 472–page annual report from the Pentagon's independent Director of Operational Test and Evaluation revealed that in testing Oshkosh's JLTV prototype lasted nearly six times longer between significant breakdowns than the next closest, Lockheed Martin's prototype. The Oshkosh vehicle achieved 7,051 mean miles between operational mission failure (MMBOMF); Lockheed Martin's vehicle achieved 1,271 MMBOMF. AM General's vehicle achieved just 526 MMBOMF. The target for JLTV is 2400 MMBOMF, the current up-armored HMMWV achieving 2,968 MMBOMF.

Information on protection levels was also released. In testing, both Oshkosh and Lockheed prototypes met all threshold force protection requirements and some objective-level requirements. This level of protection is better than that of up-armored HMMWVs, and similar to MRAP (Mine Resistant Ambush Protected) All-Terrain Vehicles without the underbody improvement kit across all spectrum of tested threats. AM General's prototype would need a significant redesign to meet threshold protection requirements.

=== Other operators ===
Outside of the United States, a number of other countries have shown an interest in or have ordered the JLTV. These include Belgium, Brazil, Lithuania, North Macedonia, Montenegro, Romania and Slovenia. All have ordered via FMS with the exception of Belgium which is a direct sale. Portugal and the United Kingdom have expressed an interest in acquiring the JLTV. Australia joined the TD phase of JLTV but ultimately opted to procure the locally produced Thales Hawkei. India expressed interest in joining the JLTV program, but did not join.

== Technical description ==
The JLTV has been designed to comply with the U.S. Army's Long Term Armor Strategy (LTAS). The LTAS system follows an A-kit/B-kit principle, with vehicles designed "fitted for, but not with" protection. Protection kits can be installed and uninstalled from vehicles in the field using basic tools. The A-kit is fitted on the production line and is a combination of a limited amount of armoring, in difficult-to-access areas of the vehicle, together with a significant amount of armor installation attachments and required support structures. The bulk of the armor, the B-kit, is installed in the field on an as-required basis.

Two soldiers can install B-kit armor in five hours. An 800-pound RPG protection kit can be installed in two hours at field-level maintenance and completed by the crew within 30 minutes. The JLTV offers protection levels greater than those of up-armored HMMWVs and comparable to those of original MRAP class designs, but in an overall vehicle package that is considerably smaller and lighter than vehicles procured under the U.S. Marines MRAP procurement.

The benefits of the A-kit/B-kit principle are that armor is only fitted when required, reducing vehicle wear and tear and, by default, whole lifecycle costs. Improvements and/or upgrades to armor are also far easier to integrate into an appliqué solution. No quantity for JLTV armoring kits has yet been disclosed, but it is anticipated that the estimated $65,000 kits will be procured on a one-kit to three-vehicle basis. The overall protection will include a spall liner to minimize perforation effects within a vehicle when the vehicle takes hostile fire.

The JLTV has a requirement for an automatic fire-extinguishing system to protect the crew cabin. Fuel tanks are mounted externally and shielded by the JLTV structure. Each crew seat has a combined seat and blast restraint device. Ingress time for a crew of four in combat equipment is 30 seconds or less. Egress with B-kit doors is within 10 seconds. In April 2009, Marine Corps Commandant James Conway warned that the Marine Corps "will not buy a vehicle that's 20,000 lb."

Requirements called for the cabin heater to raise the crew compartment temperature from −40 °F (−40 °C) to 65 °F (18 °C) in one hour. The air-conditioner should drop the temperature from 120 °F (49 °C) to 90 °F (32 °C) within forty minutes. The JLTV was to be equipped with a diagnostic monitoring system that will electronically alert the operator of equipment failures so that they can be fixed. The electronic monitoring will observe the fuel, air intake, engine, cooling, transmission, energy storage, power generation and vehicle speed as well as other systems.

=== Mobility ===
The Pentagon required at least 600 mean miles before an essential function failure. The vehicle was to be capable of traveling for 3 miles (5 km) cross-country having endured three 0.3-inch (7.6 mm) perforations of half-full main fuel tanks. The JLTV must operate in altitudes from minus 500 feet to 12,000 feet and maintain full mission capability in temperatures from −40 to 125 °F (−40 to 52 °C), according to established requirements. When temperatures drop well below zero, the JLTV must start within one minute with no external aids, kits or prior warming of the batteries. The vehicle must be capable of traveling paved 350 miles (560 km) at 35 miles per hour (56 km/h) or 300 miles (480 km) in operational terrain on a single tank of JP-8 fuel. Acceleration from 0 to 30 miles per hour (0 to 48 km/h) in 9.7 seconds on dry, level, hard terrain was required as a threshold requirement (objective being 7 seconds), as was the ability to ford 60 inches (150 cm) of saltwater without a fording kit, in forward and reverse, while maintaining contact with the ground.

Other tactically driven mobility requirements include a threshold 27-foot turning radius and the ability to climb 24-inch vertical obstacles in forward and reverse. The JLTV must be able to drive off an 18-inch vertical step at 15 mph and sustain no mechanical damage. It will be capable of traversing a 20-degree V-ditch that is 25 feet wide at an approach angle of 45-degree. It can 'jump' a 6-inch parallel curb at 15 mph and traverse a 20-foot flight of stairs at 5 mph. It must climb a 60 percent dry, hard-surfaced gradient and traverse a 40 percent sideslope with no degradation in driver control.

The JLTV is transportable by sea, rail, and air. The JLTV is transportable on all classes of ocean-going transport ships with minimal disassembly. It was required to be rail-transportable on U.S. and NATO country railways. Air transportability will be by fixed-wing aircraft as large or larger than the Lockheed C-130 Hercules and sling-loadable with rotary-wing aircraft such as the CH-47/MH-47 Chinook and Sikorsky CH-53 Sea Stallion. The proposed ambulance variant was to be air-droppable by Lockheed C-5 Galaxy and Boeing C-17 Globemaster III fixed-wing aircraft. The JLTV can be prepared in 30 minutes for transport by aircraft, Maritime Prepositioning Force ships or rail. This is aided by an adjustable-height suspension.

== Versions ==
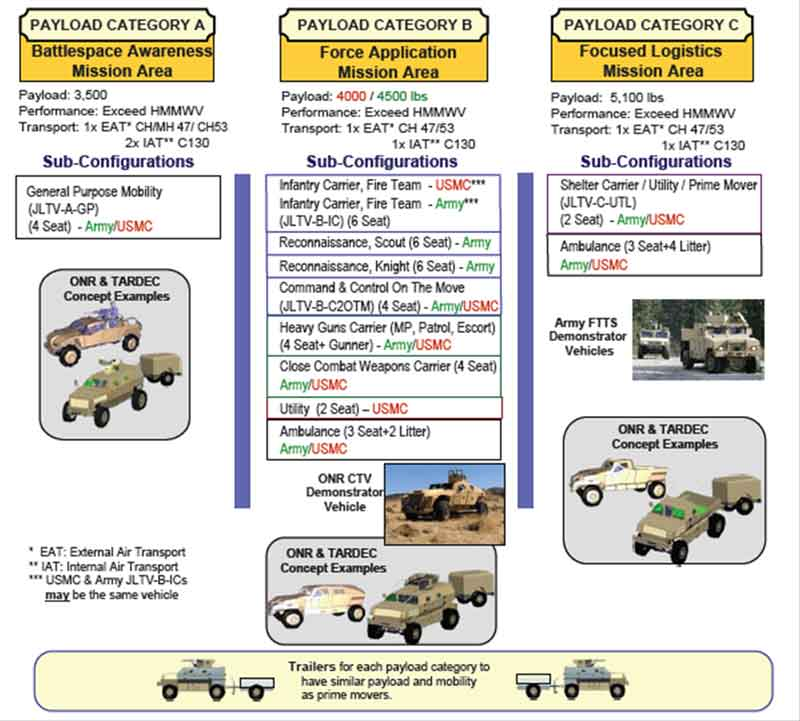
Early JLTV configurations

The JLTV family and its nomenclature evolved throughout the development process and to date the U.S. Army has allocated M designations to four individual JLTV configurations. In JLTV's Initial Capability Document, there were four payload options. This later reduced to three, Payload Categories A, B, and C. By the time Capability Development Document version 3.3 was published at the conclusion of JLTV's Technology Development (TD) phase, payload options had been reduced to two and payload verbiage had been dropped, replaced by reference to variants. From that point on, two stated variants were required, the Combat Tactical Vehicle (CTV) and Combat Support Vehicle (CSV).

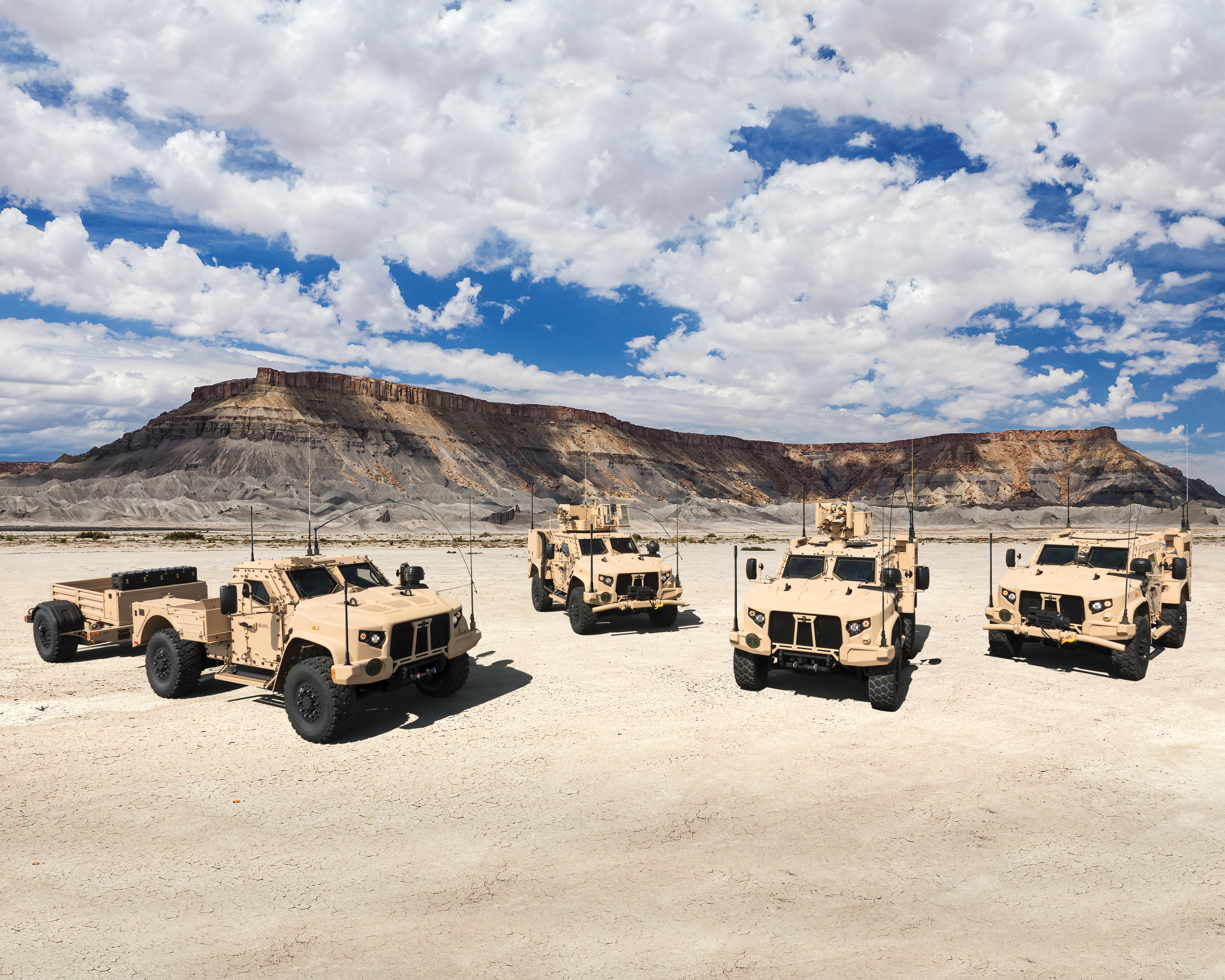
JLTV variants including companion trailer as of October 2017

The CTV configuration replaced the previous Category A and Category B configurations and was a 4-seat vehicle with a 3,500-pound payload. The CSV replaced the previous Category C configuration and was a 2-seat vehicle with a 5,100-pound payload. The JLTV family now consists of three base vehicle platforms, Utility (JLTV-UTL), Close Combat Weapons Carrier (JLTV-CCWC) and General Purpose (JLTV-GP). The Utility base vehicle platform has two doors. The General Purpose and Close Combat Weapons Carrier base vehicle platforms have four doors. Standard U.S. military M-designators are applied base vehicle platforms when outfitted to a specific Mission Package Configuration. These currently are:

- M1278 Heavy Guns Carrier – General Purpose vehicle platform in Heavy Guns Carrier Mission Package Configuration (JLTV-HGC)
- M1279 Utility – Utility (JLTV-UTL) base vehicle platform in Utility Mission Package Configuration
- M1280 General Purpose – General Purpose (JLTV-GP) base vehicle platform in General Purpose Mission Package Configuration
- M1281 Close Combat Weapons Carrier – Close Combat Weapons Carrier (JLTV-CCWC) base vehicle platform in Close Combat Weapons Carrier Mission Package Configuration

There is a companion trailer (JLTV-T), which is towable by all JLTV variants.
