= JLTV (disambiguation) =

JLTV usually refers to Joint Light Tactical Vehicle.

JLTV may also refer to:

- Jewish Life Television (JLTV)
- Jilin Television (JLTV; Chinese: 吉林电视台; pinyin: Jílín Diànshìtái)
- Joint Light Tactical Vehicle program, a former U.S. military general purpose light vehicle program, replacing the Humvee
  - Lockheed Martin JLTV
  - General Tactical Vehicles JLTV Eagle
  - BAE Systems JLTV
- Jean-Louis Tixier-Vignancour, French lawyer and politician
