= MillenWorks Light Utility Vehicle =

Millenworks LUV
- Type: Utility Vehicle
- Place of origin: USA

Production history
- Designer: Rod Millen
- Designed: 2007
- Manufacturer: MillenWorks

Specifications
- Length: 5.21 m (205in)
- Width: 2.29 m (90in)
- Height: 2.03 m (80in) (nominal)
- Crew: 1+4
- Armor: A & B level armor kits
- Main armament: Remote Weapon Station
- Engine: Steyr Motors M16 VTI Combat 2x Brushless permanent magnet motors 215 hp, 400 ft.lbf 400 ft.lbf each
- Payload capacity: 1814 kg (4000 lb)
- Transmission: (rear) Eaton Autoshift 6 speed Semi-automatic transmission (front) Klune-V 2-Speed gearbox
- Suspension: SLA using semi-active Magneto Rheological dampers with ride height control
- Ground clearance: .46 m (18in) (nominal)
- Maximum speed: 122 km/h (76 mph)

The MillenWorks Light Utility Vehicle (LUV) is a prototype testbed for automotive technologies. It was designed and built by MillenWorks under contract to the Tank Automotive Research, Development and Engineering Center. Textron Marine and Land Systems will use the platform for further development of component technologies. The vehicle was a possible Joint Light Tactical Vehicle candidate, but was not selected.

== Design ==
The LUV has a very revolutionary drivetrain layout. The front wheels of the vehicle are powered by an electric motor located under the hood, while the rear wheels are powered by a separate diesel-electric parallel hybrid consisting of a second electric motor as well as a standard NATO M16 diesel motor. This eliminates the driveshaft common on most 4WD vehicles, and reduces the chances of an IED "mobility kill", since a hit in either the front or rear will not completely incapacitate the vehicle. Eliminating the driveshaft also allows for greater ground clearance, which combined with a V-hull design, improves survivability from land mines, allowing the blast more space to dissipate. The vehicle's other safety features include scalable armor protection and a quick-release windshield for emergency egress. The front and rear sub-frames are identical, along with interchangeable suspension corners, which reduces the number of required spare parts. The throttle, braking system, and steering are all x-by-wire control systems. The driver sits in a centered position, similar to Rod Millen's Pikes Peak race cars and the McLaren F1. It is transportable by C-130, CH-47, and CH-53.

== See also ==
- HMMWV replacement process
- Shadow RST-V (cancelled)
- International FTTS
