= Hawkei =

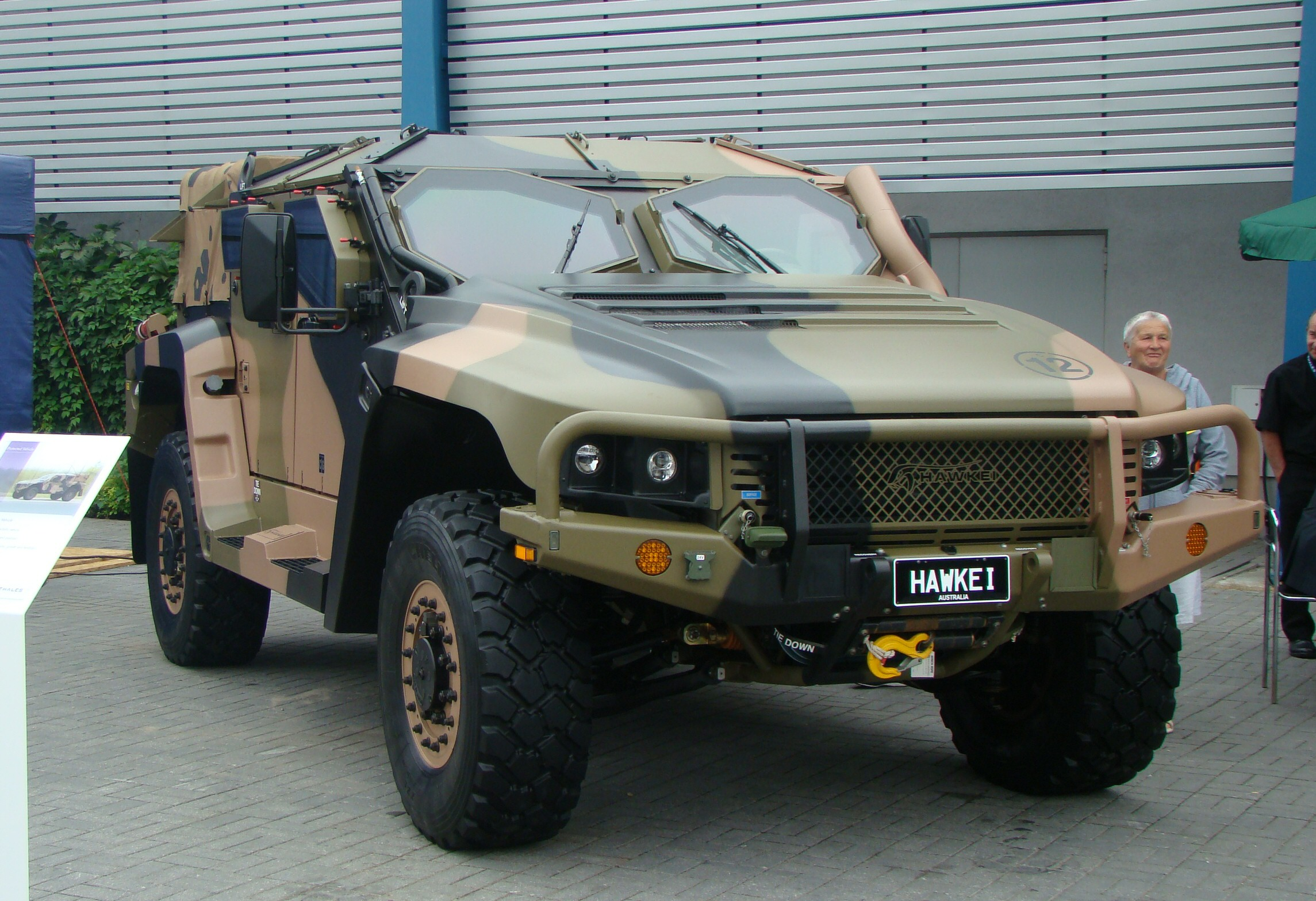
- A Hawkei protected mobility vehicle on display at the 2014 International Defence Industry Exhibition
- Type: Multirole armoured car / military light utility vehicle
- Place of origin: Australia

Service history
- Used by: Australian Army; Royal Australian Air Force

Production history
- Designer: Thales Australia; Boeing Australia; Plasan
- Designed: 2010
- Manufacturer: Thales Australia
- Produced: 2016—2022
- No. built: 1,100
- Variants: See Variants

Specifications
- Mass: 7.0 t (15,432 lb) (kerb), 10.4 t (22,928 lb) (GVM)
- Length: 5,780 mm (19 ft 0 in)
- Width: 2,396 mm (7 ft 10 in)
- Height: 2,300 mm (7 ft 7 in)
- Crew: 2
- Passengers: Up to 4 pax (4-door variant)
- Armor: Greater than STANAG 4569 (Level 1). Additional applique armour provided by Plasan composite and V-shaped monocoque hull
- Main armament: Manned weapon mount up to 12.7mm HMG or 40mm AGL or EOS R400 RWS up to 12.7mm HMG, 40mm AGL or Javelin ATGM
- Engine: Steyr M16 (3.2 l, inline-six, turbo-diesel engine); 200 kW (268 hp) (at 4,000 rpm); 610 N⋅m (450 lb⋅ft) (at 2,000 rpm)
- Payload capacity: Internally: 3.0 t (6,614 lb); Towing: 4.0 t (8,818 lb) (single axle trailer)
- Transmission: ZF 8HP90S (8F / 1R); GHM 2-speed transfer case
- Suspension: AxleTech 3000, fully independent suspension, coil and double wishbone
- Ground clearance: 460 mm (1 ft 6 in) (fording without preparation:1,200 mm (3 ft 11 in))
- Fuel capacity: 200 L (53 U.S. gal)
- Operational range: 600 km (373 mi)
- Maximum speed: 130km/h (81 mph)
- Steering system: Power-assisted

The Hawkei is an Australian light four-wheel-drive protected mobility vehicle. Originally designed in 2010 to meet an Australian Defence Force (ADF) requirement for a light armoured patrol vehicle to replace some of its Land Rover Perentie variants. The Hawkei is a highly mobile, highly protected, 7-tonne vehicle, with inbuilt systems to allow it to be used as a fighting platform. It has been developed with Vehicle Electronic Architecture to be mission system ready.

It is intended to undertake a range of mission profiles, including troop movement, command and control, electronic warfare, liaison, surveillance and reconnaissance. Prime contractors include Thales Australia, Boeing Australia, Plasan (Israel) and PAC Group. In October 2015, the Australian Government announced the purchase of 1,100 Hawkei vehicles from Thales Australia.

== History ==
As part of a wider project to replace the ADF's fleet of operational support vehicles, Project Land 121 Phase 4 – Protected Mobility Vehicle (Light) or PMV-L, is a requirement for up to 1,300 specialised light armoured vehicles to replace some of the in-service Land Rovers. Key criteria for the project included: off-road mobility, integrated vehicle electronic architecture, substantial payloads, high levels of protection against land mines, improvised explosive devices and ballistic weapons, while being light enough to be airlifted by military helicopters. The three options considered as part of the project were:

- Option 1, Joint Light Tactical Vehicle (JLTV) Program – align the PMV-L requirement to the United States JLTV program to replace its fleet of High Mobility Multipurpose Wheeled Vehicle or 'Humvee' (awarded 25 August 2015 to Oshkosh offering L-ATV);
- Option 2, Manufactured and Supported in Australia (MSA); and
- Option 3, Market available – pursuit of this option is subject to Australian Government decisions on Options 1 and 2.

Competitors for the MSA option included the combat-proven MOWAG Eagle IV from General Dynamics Land Systems; the British military then selected Ocelot from Force Protection; and the Hawkei offering from Thales Australia. The JLTV option included entries from BAE Systems/Navistar, AM General/General Dynamics and Lockheed Martin.

In December 2011, the Department of Defence (DoD) announced Hawkei as the preferred vehicle for further development and testing under the MSA option.

In October 2015, Prime Minister Malcolm Turnbull and Minister for Defence Marise Payne announced the purchase of 1,100 Hawkei vehicles and trailers at a cost of $1.3 billion with the Hawkei to be manufactured at Thales's facility in Bendigo. The purchase includes 1058 trailers designed by Schutt Industries and manufactured by Thales at their facility in Eagle Farm. Two variants of the Hawkei will be purchased: a 4-door variant and a 2-door utility variant. The 4-door variant will be able to be configured using a mission-kit for three roles: Command, Liaison and Reconnaissance. 635 4-door variants and 465 2-door variants will be purchased.

In September 2018, the Australian National Audit Office released a report which criticised aspects of the Hawkei project. The report judged that Australia should have remained in the JLTV program to provide competition for the Hawkei procurement and that the Department of Defence had not kept ministers fully informed about the Hawkei program. This included not providing ministers with a study which found that there were few benefits from building the vehicles in Australia. The ANAO was unable to publish some elements of the audit after Attorney General Christian Porter ruled that publishing it would compromise national security. Thales had taken legal action earlier in the year seeking to have material removed from the report. Some of the suppressed elements of the report were released in 2021 following a freedom of information request, and included material stating that the Department of Defence had been unable to demonstrate that the Hawkei represented value for money compared to the JLTV.

In December 2018, the Hawkei faced reliability issues following a demonstration test conducted on 19 November 2018, delaying full-rate production.

In September 2020, Defence Minister Linda Reynolds and Defence Industry Minister Melissa Price announced that the Hawkei would enter full-rate production at Thales's facility in Bendigo at approximately 50 vehicles per month.

In November 2020, the DoD temporarily suspended the use of the Hawkei fleet until an issue with the anti-lock braking system (ABS) was found. In July 2021, Defence Minister Peter Dutton and Defence Industry Minister Melissa Price announced that Thales had developed a fix for the braking issue.

In March 2022, the production of the 1,000th Hawkei was completed by Thales.

In November 2022, Thales advised the DoD that it had identified a new issue with the Hawkei's brakes. As a result the DoD banned the Hawkei from use on civilian roads and imposed a 40 km/h (25 mph) maximum speed limit on their use. Thales developed an interim solution with the ABS modulator on every Hawkei changed every ten months on a sample fleet of 125 vehicles. In July 2024, Defence Industry Minister Pat Conroy and Brigadier John-Paul Ouvrier announced that Thales had resolved the Hawkei's ABS issues and that there would be a remediation program to install the fixes.

During 2023-24, 138 low rate initial production vehicles were withdrawn from service so they can be upgraded to final contracted specifications.

A total of 1,100 Hawkei PMVs and 1,058 Hawkei-configuration trailers were acquired for the Australian Army and the RAAF, with the final vehicles rolling off the line in mid-2022. Two vehicles have since been sold back to Thales Australia, which employed them in a competitive trial for the JGSDF. Introduction into service is complete, with the delivery of the 1098th and final vehicle to an active ADF unit handed over to No. 2 Security Forces Squadron RAAF at RAAF Base Amberley at an official ceremony on 28 August 2025.

== Variants ==
All variants use the same four wheeled platform.

=== 4 door ===
Dual cab with a crew of four to six, weapons system options including up to 12.7mm guns or 40 mm grenade systems in various mounts with a remote operated option.

The 4-doors variants include the following sub variants:

- Liaison: vehicle with general communication equipment, up to 4 personnel
- Command: vehicle with additional integrated electronic command, control and communication systems, up to 4 personnel
- Reconnaissance: vehicle equipped for light infantry, reconnaissance and Air Force security missions, up to 4 personnel.

=== 2 door ===
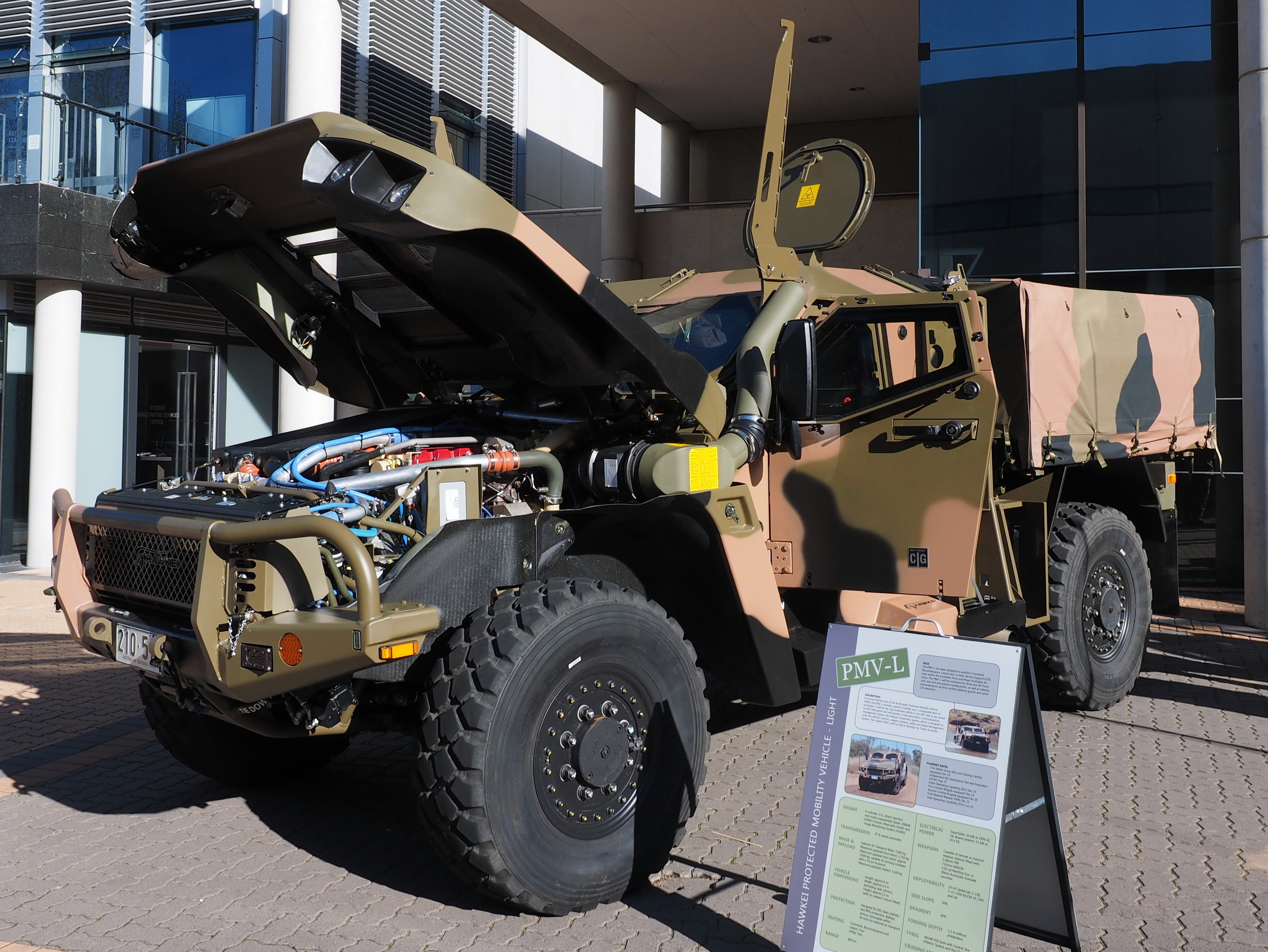
A Hawkei utility variant in 2016

Single-extended cab with a flat-bed cargo area measuring; L: 2,000 mm (79 in) x W: 2,400 mm (94 in). The vehicle has a crew of 2–3 and has a kerb weight of 6,800 kg (14,991 lb) with a rated cargo load of 3,000 kg (6,614 lb). The load bed is designed to accommodate four 1000mm × 1200mm (40" x 48") NATO standard military pallets or a single tricon (one-third ISO 20 ft) container.

==== NASAMS ====
The Australian Army fields three flatbed utility variants for their NASAMS short-range ground-based air defence (SRGBAD) system. The High Mobility Launcher (HML) variant comprises six rails that can fire either MIM-120C-7 AMRAAM or MIM-9X missiles with the capability to fire a combination of the two missile types. The Electro-Optic Infra-Red (EO/IR) variant is equipped with a mast-mounted Raytheon AN/AAS-52 Multispectral Targeting System (MTS)-A. The short-range radar variant is equipped with a CEA Technologies CEATAC AESA radar.

=== Proposed variants ===
==== Border Protection ====
Dual cab with a crew of four to six, various equipment options including force protection radar, surveillance and communications systems.

==== Special Operations Vehicle ====
Dual cab manned by a crew of four to six with up to three weapon systems:

- Front co-driver swing mount;
- Roof mounted manual gunring or remote weapon station; and/or
- Rear-facing swing mount.

Options included full doors, half doors, windscreen and scalable racking system for payload.

==== Counter Drone ====
Dual cab equipped with either a 30mm M230LF cannon, a 7.62mm M134 minigun or a VAMPIRE rocket launcher.

== Etymology ==
The Hawkei is named after Acanthophis hawkei, a species of death adder. In turn, the snake is named after former Prime Minister of Australia Bob Hawke.

== Operators ==
=== Current operators ===
Australia
1,098 Hawkei in service with the Australian Army and the Royal Australian Air Force, with final deliveries in August 2025 (1,100 ordered with two sold back to Thales Australia).

=== Potential operators ===
Canada
The Canadian Army is looking for a successor of the Mercedes G-Wagon and Chevrolet Silverado under the Light Utility Vehicle (LUV) project.
The project has a budget of $250 to 499 million Canadian dollars, and is expected to be implemented in 2027 or 2028, and delivery to start in 2028 or 2029, until 2031 or 2032.
Several vehicles are being considered.
- Roshel probably with the Senator which is already being manufactured in Canada, and being supplied by Canada to Ukraine.
- Thales Hawkei which was observed ongoing testing in Canada in April 2020.

Japan
On 5 August 2022, it was reported in Japan that Mitsubishi Heavy Industries may manufacture the Hawkei under licence from Thales in case the contract is awarded to them for the JGSDF. It's marketed to replace the Komatsu LAV. The Hawkei and the Mowag Eagle V were ordered in limited quantity for trials in 2023, and were observed on public roads in Japan. The Japanese Ministry of Defense has an initial requirement for around 1,000 vehicles if the Hawkei wins the contract.

United Kingdom
Thales UK is offering the Bushmaster and the Hawkei for the Land Mobility Programme.
The Hawkei would be part of the Light Protected Mobility category, whose role would consist of command and liaison, command and control, patrol tasks, ISTAR, GBAD, CBRN, tactical support and utility. This category will replace the Stormer HVM, FV430 Bulldog, Iveco LMV (Panther) and the Foxhound.

=== Failed bids ===
France and Belgium
THE VBAE programme (Véhicule Blindé d’Aide à Engagement) is a future light armoured vehicle in collaboration between France and Belgium. For the French Army, it will replace the VBL.
The Thales Hawkei was one of the competitors.
In December 2023 OCCAR signed a cooperation agreement with Arquus, Nexter (KNDS France) and John Cockerill to pre-design a contender for the VBAE programme. In July 2024, the development was approved and therefore, unless major changes, the Scarabee will become the VBAE.

Poland
The Thales Hawkei was one of the four finalists of the Pegaz Programme. This programme was initially planned in two phases. The first phase intended to equip the special operations forces and the military police with 4×4 to participate in missions such as patrol, intervention, counter-terrorism and reconnaissance scenarios. In the longer run, the winner of the competition was intended to become the new multi-purpose 4×4 of the Polish Army.
The pre-selected vehicles were the Fortress Mk2 (French), Thales Hawkei (Australia), Patriot II (Polish / Czech) and Tur V.
In 2021, the programme was cancelled. This programme could have resulted in an initial purchase of 50 vehicles, and as many as 700 over the long term.

== See also ==
- List of armoured fighting vehicles by country
