= Nimer-1 =

- Type: armoured personnel carrier
- Place of origin: Oman

Service history
- Used by: See Operators

Specifications
- Mass: 5000 kg (gross)
- Length: 54.8m
- Width: 20.6
- Height: 20.9
- Crew: 2+6
- Armor: 5mm Armoured steel - Level III NIJ (7.62×51mm)
- Main armament: 12.7mm Mk18 machine gun for TAW missile launcher
- Secondary armament: 2 4 tube 76mm smoke grenade launcher
- Engine: 4 Stroke-cycle, water-cooled, Direct Injection Diesel Engine Naturally aspirated 102 hp (76KW) at 3500 rpm
- Power/weight: 20.4 hp/ton
- Suspension: Semi-elliptic laminated leaf spring
- Operational range: 900 km
- Maximum speed: 107 km/h

The Nimer-1 (Arabic: نمر Tiger), a wheeled armoured personnel carrier, is the first indigenous fighting vehicle made by Oman and is built by Engine Engineering Company LLC. An order for 6 armoured 4×4 vehicle has been tendered by the Royal Bahraini Army. The company is marketing these vehicles to police forces, foreign armies for border patrol or for riot control.

The exterior views suggest it employs a V-hull design.

== Variants ==
Nimer-2 is a full armoured and slightly smaller variant of the Nimer-1. It uses Level B6 armour plating.

== Operators ==
- Bahrain
  - Royal Bahraini Army - Nimer-2 version

== Similar vehicles ==
- BPM-97 Russia
- AMZ Dzik Poland
- Bushmaster Protected Mobility Vehicle Australia
- Cheetah MMPV United States
- Otokar Kaya Turkey
- Otokar Cobra Turkey
- Dozor-B Ukraine
- Fennek Germany/Netherlands
- Komatsu LAV Japan
- BMC - Kirpi Turkey
- Mahindra Marksman India
- Oshkosh M-ATV United States
- MillenWorks Light Utility Vehicle United States
- Petit Véhicule Protégé France
- Reva APC South Africa
- RG-31 Nyala South Africa
- RG-32 Scout South Africa
- Shorland S600 Belgium/Australia
- Saxon (vehicle) United Kingdom
- T-98 Kombat Russia
- GAZ-2975 Russia
- Véhicule Blindé Léger France
- Wolf Armoured Vehicle Israel
