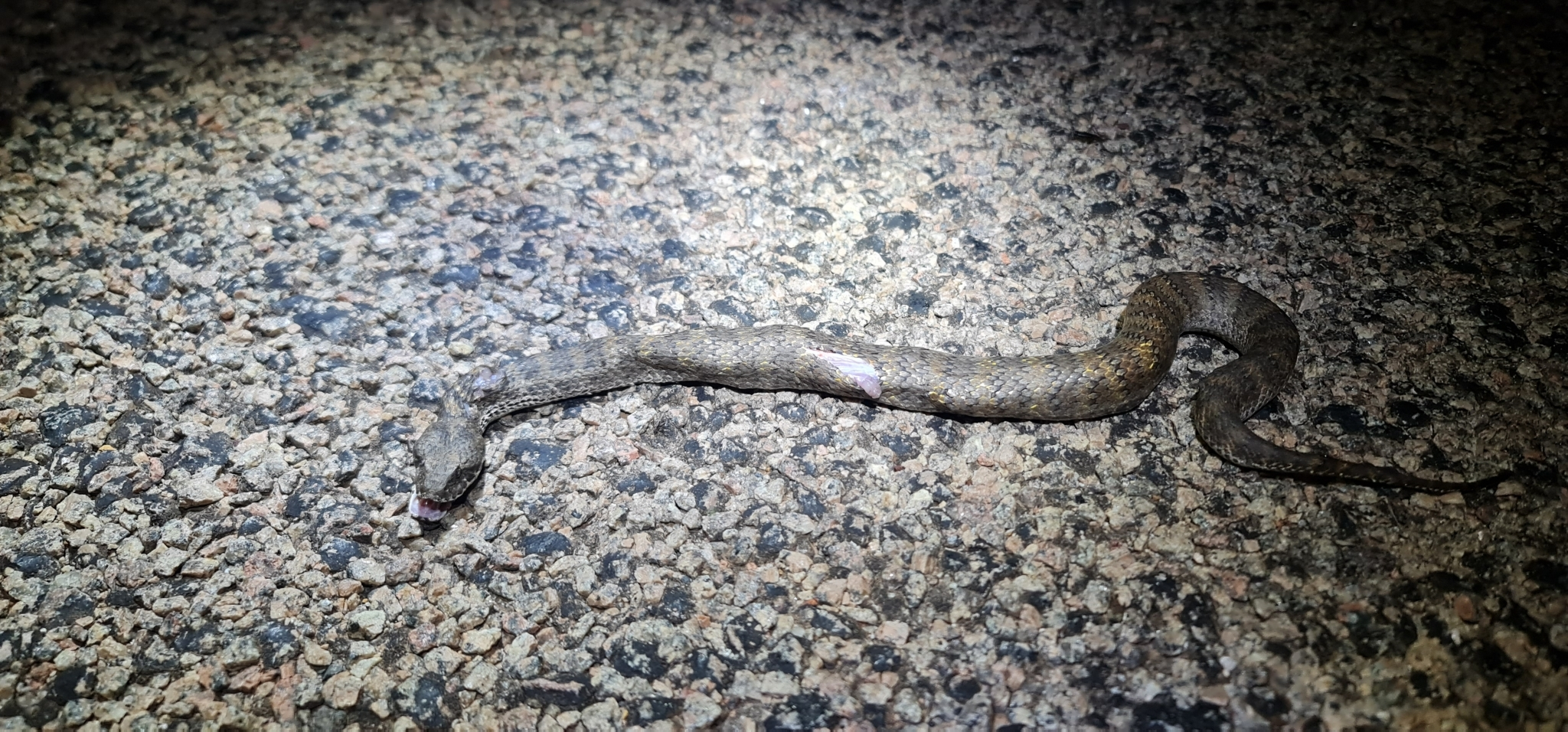
- Plains Death Adder

Conservation status
- Vulnerable (IUCN 3.1)

Scientific classification
- Kingdom: Animalia
- Phylum: Chordata
- Class: Reptilia
- Order: Squamata
- Suborder: Serpentes
- Family: Elapidae
- Genus: Acanthophis
- Species: A. hawkei

Binomial name
- Acanthophis hawkei Wells & Wellington, 1985

= Acanthophis hawkei =

Barkly Tableland death adder

Species of snake

The Australian Barkly Tableland death adder (Acanthophis hawkei) is a species of venomous snake in the family Elapidae. The exact distribution of the species is unclear, but suitable habitat for the plains death adder consists of flat, treeless, cracking-soil riverine floodplains. Based on the presence of suitable habitat, the potential geographic range for this species extends from Western Queensland, across the north of the Northern Territory to north-east Western Australia. Disjunct populations of the plains death adder are known to occur in the Mitchell Grass Downs of western Queensland, the Barkly Tableland on the Northern Territory/Queensland border and east of Darwin in the Northern Territory. The snake is named after former Prime Minister of Australia Bob Hawke.

A Protected Mobility Vehicle of the Australian Army, the Hawkei PMV, is named after the species.
