= Humvee replacement process =

Effort by the U.S. military to replace the Humvee

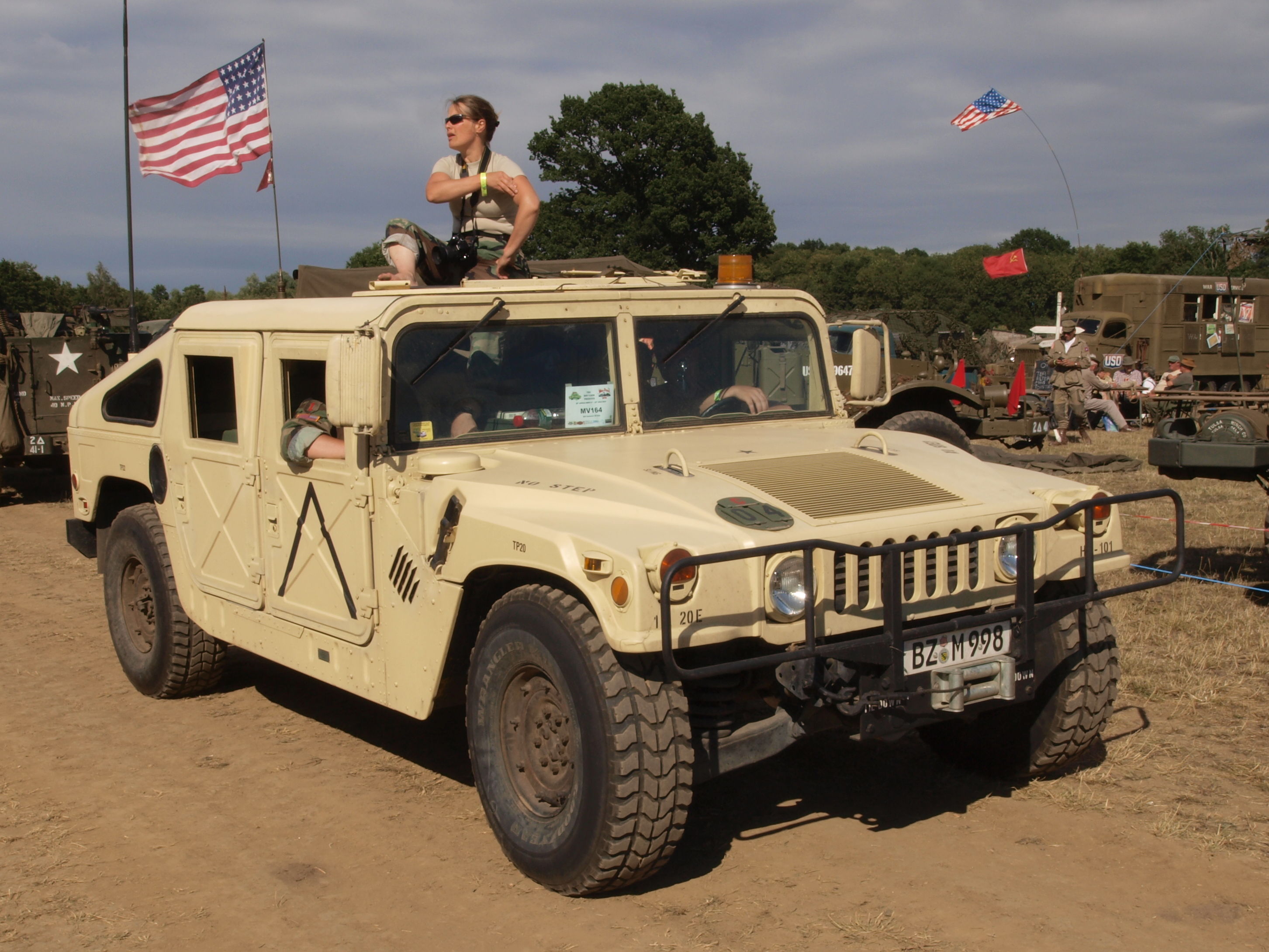
- A Humvee vehicle
- Duration: 2012–2015 (selection phase); 2015–2040 (replacement phase)
- Location: United States
- Theme: Replacement of military vehicles
- Organised by: U.S. military
- Participants: U.S. military; AM General; Lockheed Martin; Oshkosh Corporation

The Humvee replacement process was an effort by the U.S. military to replace the current AM General Humvee multi-purpose motor vehicle. The Humvee had evolved several times since its introduction in 1985, and is now used in tactical roles for which it was not originally intended. The U.S. military pursued several initiatives to replace it, both in the short and long term. The short-term replacement efforts utilize commercial off-the-shelf (COTS) vehicles, while the long-term efforts focused on building requirements for the Humvee replacement and technology research and evaluation in the form of various prototype vehicles.

After going through the replacement process, the Joint Light Tactical Vehicle (JLTV), manufactured by Oshkosh Corporation, was chosen as the successor.

== Short term ==
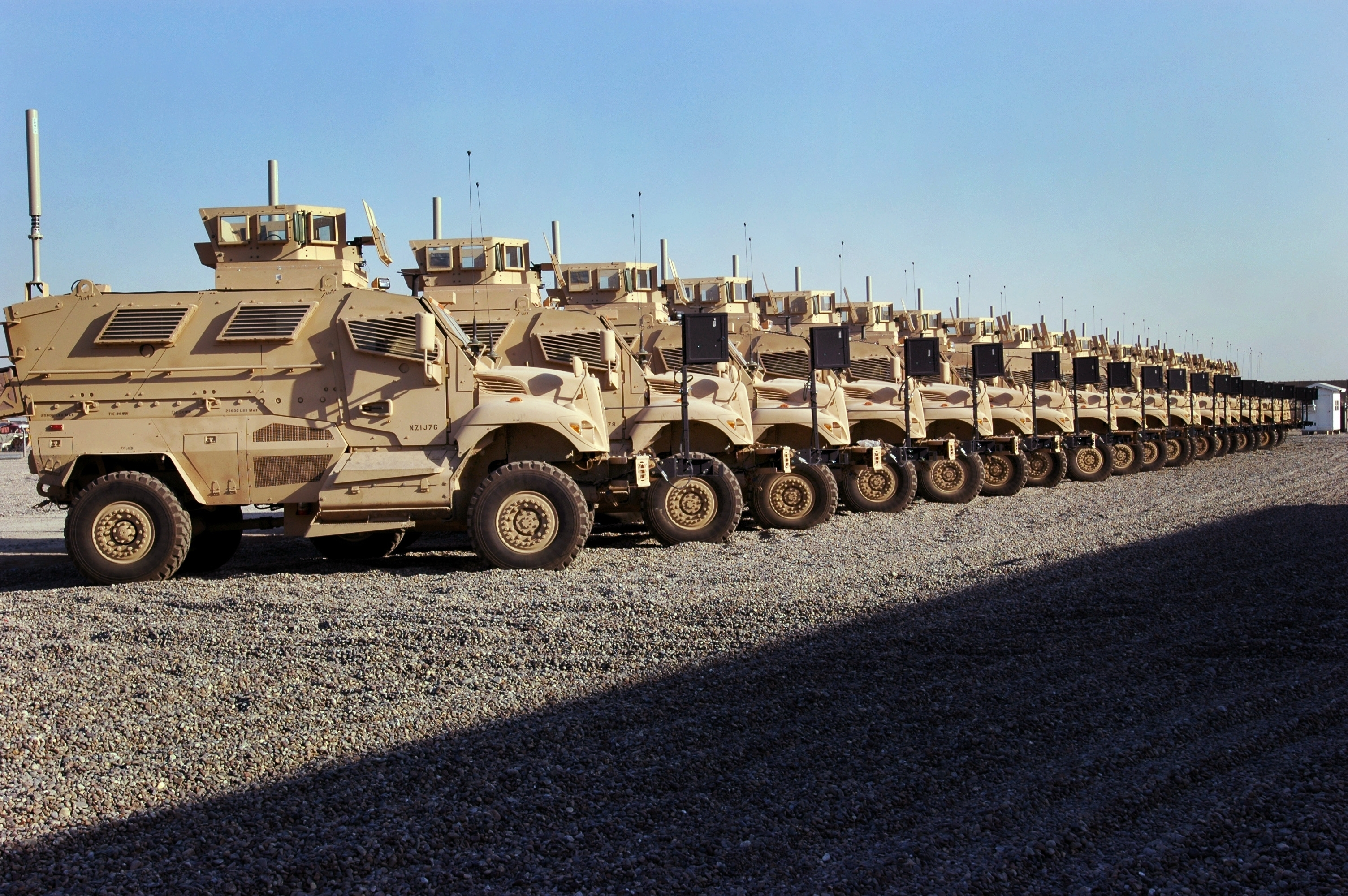
International MaxxPro Category 1 MRAP

In the short term, Humvees that were in service in Iraq were replaced by Category 1 MRAP (Mine Resistant Ambush Protected) armored vehicles, primarily the Force Protection Cougar H and the International MaxxPro.

The United States Marine Corps replaced all Humvees patrolling "outside the wire" with MRAP vehicles. The U.S. military began procuring a lighter vehicle under the MRAP All Terrain Vehicle (M-ATV) program in 2009.

== Long term ==
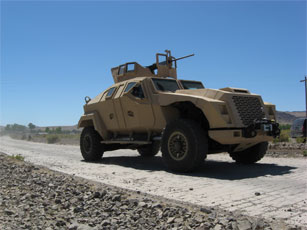
The Combat Tactical Vehicle, a prototype Joint Light Tactical Vehicle

The Joint Light Tactical Vehicle will replace around 55,000 Humvees and traces back to 2005, but did not publicly emerge until January 2006. Early government requests for information noted: "In response to an operational need and an ageing fleet of light tactical wheeled vehicles, the joint services have developed a requirement for a new tactical wheeled vehicle platform that will provide increased force protection, survivability, and improved capacity over the current Up-Armoured High-Mobility Multipurpose Wheeled Vehicle (UAH) while balancing mobility and transportability requirements with total ownership costs." The joint service nature of the effort was assured through Congressional language in the Fiscal Year 2006 (FY06) Authorization Act, which mandated that any future tactical wheeled vehicle program would be a joint program.

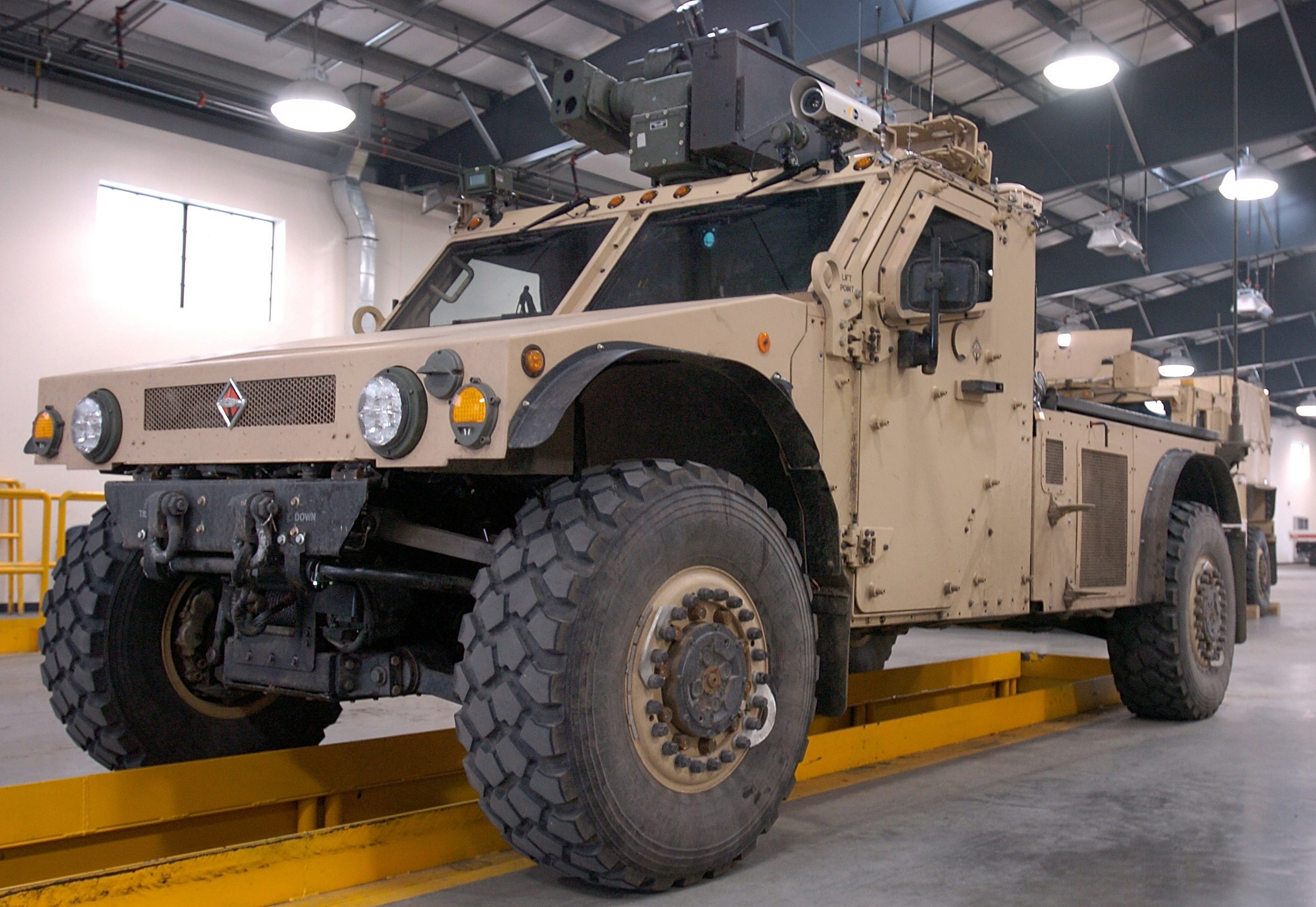
International FTTS UV Concept

The U.S. military was seeking a long term replacement for the Humvee under the Future Tactical Truck Systems (FTTS) program, which was seeking to introduce a Maneuver Sustainment Vehicle and a Utility Vehicle. Navistar International and Lockheed Martin's proposals for the Utility Vehicle were selected for competition as well as the Armor Holdings proposal for the Maneuver Sustainment Vehicle. In August 2006 they were tested at the Aberdeen Proving Ground. Following this evaluation they were parked in The Pentagon courtyard for evaluation by higher-ranking military officials. The JLTV program incorporated lessons learned from the earlier and now halted Future Tactical Truck Systems (FTTS) program and other associated efforts.

The Office of Naval Research has also funded several projects to research other technologies that may be implemented on the Humvee replacement, including the Shadow RST-V and Georgia Tech's ULTRA AP, a combat concept vehicle based on the F350 chassis, but with a "blast bucket" passenger compartment, and Ultra 3T, a project with more advanced (but unproven) technologies.

In early 2011, DARPA initiated the eXperimental Crowd-derived Combat-support Vehicle (XC2V) Design Challenge to find a replacement design for the Humvee for which Local Motors served as a hub for the challenge. The challenge specifically aimed for a Combat Reconnaissance and Combat Delivery & Evacuation vehicle. The design entries were open for voting on March 4. On June 27, a Local Motors XC2V was premiered at Carnegie Mellon University's National Robotics Engineering Center in Pittsburgh with President Obama attending. On June 28, 2011, DARPA announced the selection of Local Motors’ XC2V FLYPMode as the winner of the competition. It was selected among 162 entries. The XC2V went on to compete with vehicles from TARDEC's FED program such as British Ricardo's FED ALPHA which appears to have been selected over FED BETA.

The JLTV program (including numbers required and pricing) evolved considerably as the program developed and requirements stabilized. Oshkosh's L-ATV was selected as the winner of the JLTV program on 25 August 2015. The company was awarded a $6.75 billion low rate initial base contract with eight options to procure the first 16,901 vehicles for both the Army and Marines. Oshkosh CEO, Charles Szews, said the production contract award would involve more than 300 suppliers in 31 states across the country. The Army initially refused to detail why the L-ATV was chosen over its competitors (AM General and Lockheed Martin), likely owing to anticipations of protests from either or both of the losing bidders, these to be submitted within ten days of contract award.

On 8 September 2015, it was disclosed that losing JLTV bidder Lockheed Martin would protest the award to Oshkosh. The Government Accountability Office (GAO) had 100 days to review the program and issue a decision on the protest. On December 15, the GAO dismissed Lockheed Martin's protest because the company on December 11 decided to file a “Notice of Post-Award Bid Protest” with the U.S. Court of Federal Claims. The company filed its official protest on December 17. Lockheed Martin withdrew its protest in the Court of Federal Claims on 17 February 2016. Around the time Lockheed Martin withdrew its protest some potentially crucial data from JLTV testing was revealed. The 472 page annual report from the Pentagon's independent Director of Operational Test & Evaluation revealed that in testing Oshkosh's JLTV offer lasted nearly six times longer between significant breakdown than the next closest, Lockheed Martin's offer. The Oshkosh offer achieved 7,051 Mean Miles Between Operational Mission Failure (MMBOMF), Lockheed Martin's offer achieving 1,271 MMBOMF. The target for JLTV is 2400 MMBOMF, the current up-armored HMMWV achieving 2,968 MMBOMF. Information on protection levels was also released. It was found in testing that both Oshkosh and Lockheed prototypes met all threshold force protection requirements and some objective-level requirements. This level of protection is better than that of up-armored HMMWVs, and similar to Mine-Resistant Ambush-Protected (MRAP) All-Terrain Vehicles (M-ATV) without the underbody improvement kit across all spectrum of tested threats.

In the Pentagon's FY 2017 budget, it requested USD587.5 million to procure 1,828 JLTVs for the Army and USD113.2 million to procure 192 for the Marines.

The first delivery order for JLTV was announced on 23 March 2016 with the U.S. Army ordering 657 JLTVs, along with kits and support. The $243 million order includes vehicles for the Army and Marines and these will be delivered by first quarter FY2018. JLTV requirements remain with the Marines procuring 5,500 until 2022, and the Army buying 49,099 until 2040.

== U.S. Army ==
The Army issued a request for information for a Humvee recapitalization program in January 2010. The Army asked Congress to shift funds from procuring Humvees to recapitalizing aging Humvees. This request was denied. A second request for information was planned and would be followed up by a request for proposals.

No Humvee procurements were planned beyond 2012. The Army's 260,000 truck fleet was planned to be reduced by 15 percent by fiscal year 2017.

== U.S. Marines ==
The United States Marine Corps planned to replace all Humvees patrolling "outside the wire" with MRAP vehicles. The Marines were to reduce their fleet of Humvees from 44,000 to 32,500. The current plan is to reduce the Marine's fleet of light tactical vehicles from 24,600 to 18,500 by 2017. The planned end state is to have 3,500 A2 series Humvees, 9,500 ECV Humvees, and 5,500 Joint Light Tactical Vehicles.

== See also ==
- Joint Light Tactical Vehicle (JLTV)
- Oshkosh M-ATV
- Humvee
- MRAP (Mine Resistant Ambush Protected)
- Future Tactical Truck Systems (FTTS)
