= Royal Bahraini Army =

Land warfare branch of Bahrain's military forces

- الجيش البحريني
- Flag of the Royal Bahraini Army
- Founded: 1969
- Country: Bahrain
- Allegiance: King of Bahrain
- Branch: Army
- Role: Ground warfare
- Size: 20,000 Active; 110,000 reserve
- Part of: Bahrain Defence Force
- Garrison/HQ: Manama
- Engagements: Bahraini uprising of 2011; Saudi Arabian-led intervention in Yemen; Gulf War; 2026 Iran war

Commanders
- Current commander: Khalifa bin Ahmed Al Khalifa
- Notable commanders: Ahmed ibn Muhammad ibn Khalifa; Munzir ibn Sawa Al-Tamimi

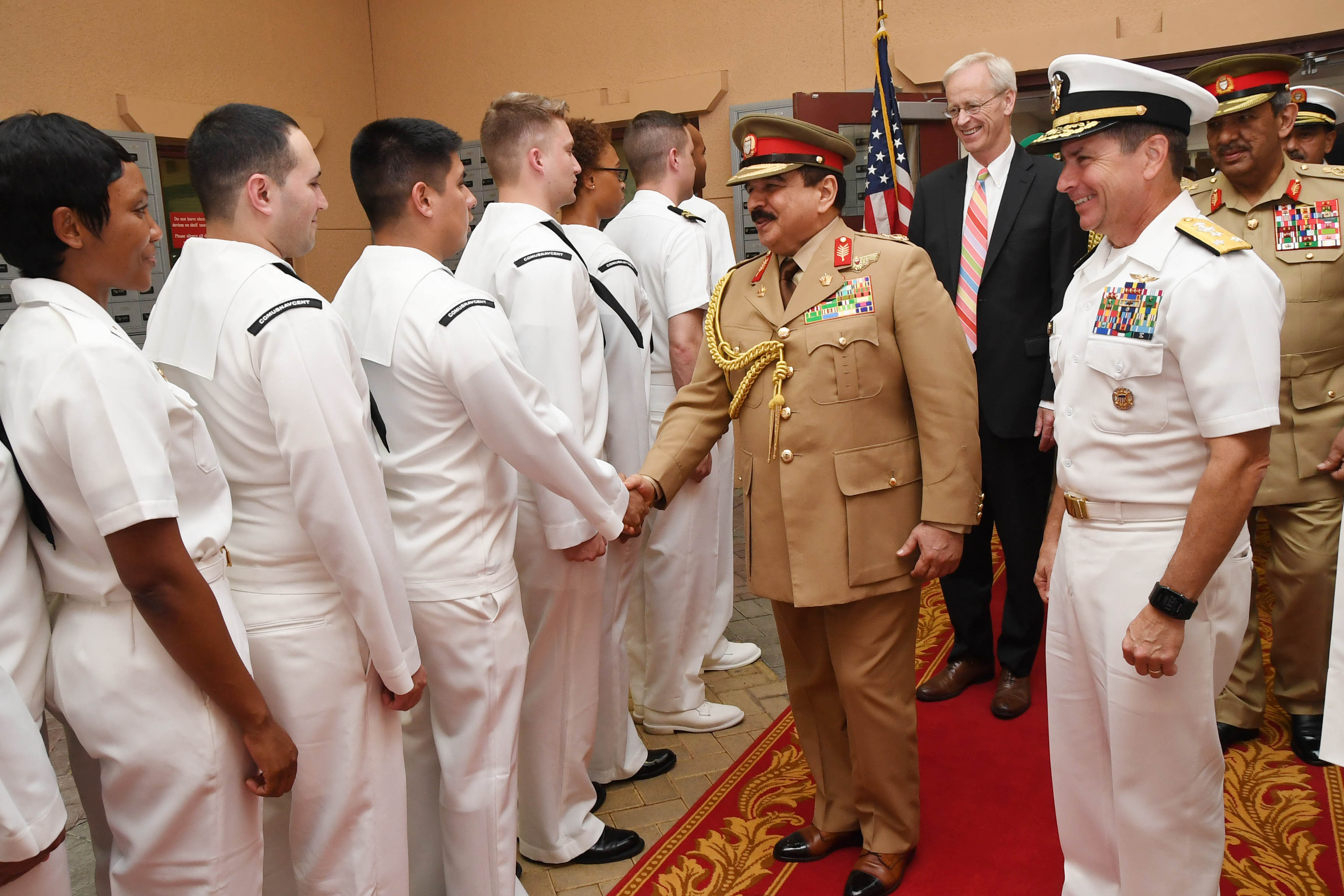
King Hamad bin Isa Al Khalifa in the Royal Bahraini Army uniform

The Royal Bahraini Army is the ground force component of the Bahrain Defence Force. The army's current strength is 20,000 personnel. It is headed by Lieutenant General Khalifa bin Abdullah Al-Khalifa.

== History ==
Bahraini ground troops took part in the Saudi Arabian-led intervention in Yemen in the Yemeni civil war. In September 2015, five Bahraini soldiers guarding the Yemeni–Saudi Arabian border were killed in unspecified circumstances. Another three died in Yemen afterwards.

== Formation ==
The army consists of 3 brigades and 2 battalions:

- 1 Armoured Brigade
  - 2 armoured battalions
  - 1 recon battalion
- 1 Mechanized Infantry Brigade
  - 2 mechanized infantry battalions
  - 1 infantry battalion
- 1 Artillery Brigade
  - 6 artillery batteries
- 1 air defence battalion
- 1 special forces battalion

== Equipment ==
The RBA has a mix of equipment purchased in the 1970s and early 1990s. They are currently modernizing some of their equipment. Most purchases in the past have been second hand from the United States or the United Kingdom. In the past few years, Bahrain has begun developing military capabilities, through the purchase of equipment from Turkey, including armoured vehicles such as Otokar Arma and Otokar Akrep (Armoured combat vehicle).

In 2019, the U.S. State Department cleared a $2.5 billion sale of the Patriot missile-defense system to Bahrain. The deal would include 60 Patriot Advanced Capability-3 Missile Segment Enhancement missiles, 36 Patriot MIM-104E Guidance Enhanced Missiles with canisters, nine M903 launchers, two AN/MPQ-65 radar sets, control stations and other associated equipment.

8 M-ATV light armored vehicles in service

=== Armoured fighting vehicles ===
Image	Name	Class	Origin	Quantity	Details
	M1A2 SEPv3	Main battle tank	United States	~50	not delivered
	M60A3	Main battle tank	United States	~100	80 more in storage.

Image	Name	Class	Origin	Number	Notes
	YPR-765	IFV	United States Netherlands	75	25 Netherlands-origin YPR-765 ACV delivered in 1996, 42 Belgium-origin AIFV-IFV delivered in 2008.
	M113	Armoured personnel carrier	United States	339	A total of 339 M113A2 were delivered
	Lynx	Command and recon	United States	35	
	Panhard M3	Armoured personnel carrier	France	110	Ordered in 1977, most of them modified, including some ambulance, CP, AEV, ARV, and 81mm mortar carrier versions
	Saxon	Armoured personnel carrier	United Kingdom	10	Purchased in the 1980s
	AML-90	Armoured car	France	22	Ordered in 1977
	Otokar Arma	Armoured personnel carrier	Turkey	73	In service from 2010
	Otokar ZPT	Armoured patrol vehicle	Turkey	133	In service 2012/13
	Otokar Akrep	Infantry mobility vehicle	Turkey	21	In service 2005
	Otokar Cobra	Infantry mobility vehicle	Turkey	15	In service 2008
	Humvee	Infantry mobility vehicle	United States	200+	2 types: BGM-71 TOW missile (44) and Browning M2HB
	Kornet-D	Anti-tank guided missile	Russia	10+	The Kornet-EM is based on the chassis of the Tigr 4x4 light armored vehicle with two retractable launcher units, each with four missiles ready to fire. In road position, the launcher units are stowed inside the vehicle.
	Interceptor	Light armoured vehicle	Pakistan	0	6 on order of these light-protected vehicles, it is likely that a series contract of minimum of 50 more vehicles would be further awarded
	Nimer-1	MRAP	Oman	6	In service since 2005
	Toyota Land Cruiser	Utility vehicle	Japan	200+	Locally modified - VDJ78R Troop Carrier
	Chevrolet Silverado	Multi-purpose vehicle	United States	50+	

=== Air Defense Systems ===
Photo	Name	Origin	Type	Number	Details
	MIM-104 Patriot	United States	Surface-to-air missiles	1	Raytheon awarded contract to supply Patriot missiles defense systems.
	MIM-23 Hawk	United States	Surface-to-air missile	8	
	AN/TWQ-1 Avenger	United States	Surface-to-air missile	10+	Self-propelled surface-to-air missile system mounted on a HMMWV
	Crotale	France	Surface-to-air missile	7	
	FIM-92A	United States	Man-portable air-defense system	14–16	Delivered 1988 along with 70 missiles
	RBS 70	Sweden	Short range air defense	14	Delivered 1980–81 along with 161 missiles
	Oerlikon 35 mm twin cannon	Switzerland	Autocannon	15	GDF-005 units
	Bofors 40 mm	Sweden	Autocannon	12	

=== Artillery ===
Photo	Name	Origin	Type	Number	Details
	M270 Multiple Launch Rocket System	United States	Multiple launch rocket system	9	MGM-140 ATACMS
	SR-5	China	Multiple launch rocket system	8+	
	M110A2 howitzer	United States	Self-propelled howitzer	38	13 as M110A2 from Netherlands delivered in 1994, 25 as M110A2 from US delivered in 1996.
	M198 howitzer	United States	Howitzer	18	
	L118	United Kingdom	Field gun	8	
	81mm EIMOS Integrated Mortar System	Spain	Mortar	6	

=== Anti-tank Weapons ===
Photo	Name	Origin	Type	Number	Details
	120 mm BAT recoilless rifle	United Kingdom	Anti tank rifle	10+	
	BGM-71C	United States	Anti-tank missile	Unknown	A total of 2,724 missiles delivered since 1983
	FGM-148 Javelin	United States	Anti-tank missile	60	180+ missiles
	Kornet-EM	Russia		Unknown	

=== Weapons ===
Type/Class	Quantity	Origin	Details
Heckler & Koch G3		West Germany	
FN FAL		Belgium	
M16A2 rifle	?	United States	
M4 carbine	?	United States	
Barrett M82 anti-materiel rifle	?	United States	
Heckler & Koch MP5	?	West Germany	
Browning Hi-Power		Belgium	
SIG Sauer P226		Germany	
FN MAG		Belgium	
M2 Browning		Belgium	

Additional equipment on order by the army include:

Type/Class	Quantity	Origin	Details
Logistics Vehicle System heavy tactical vehicle system	100+	United States	Transport of armored vehicles and tanks
M939 Truck 6x6 trucks	100+	United States	
MAN Truck & Bus military transport	200+	United States	
Toyota Coaster troops transport	100+	Japan	

Retired equipment were made in the 1950s and 1960s:

Type/Class	Quantity	Origin	Details
Ferret Armoured Fighting Vehicle	10	UK	
Alvis Saladin	10	UK	

== See also ==
- Military of Bahrain
- Royal Bahrain Naval Force
- Royal Bahraini Air Force

== Sources ==
- Bahrain
- Bahrain Army Equipment
