= Jeep Hurricane =

Jeep concept vehicle

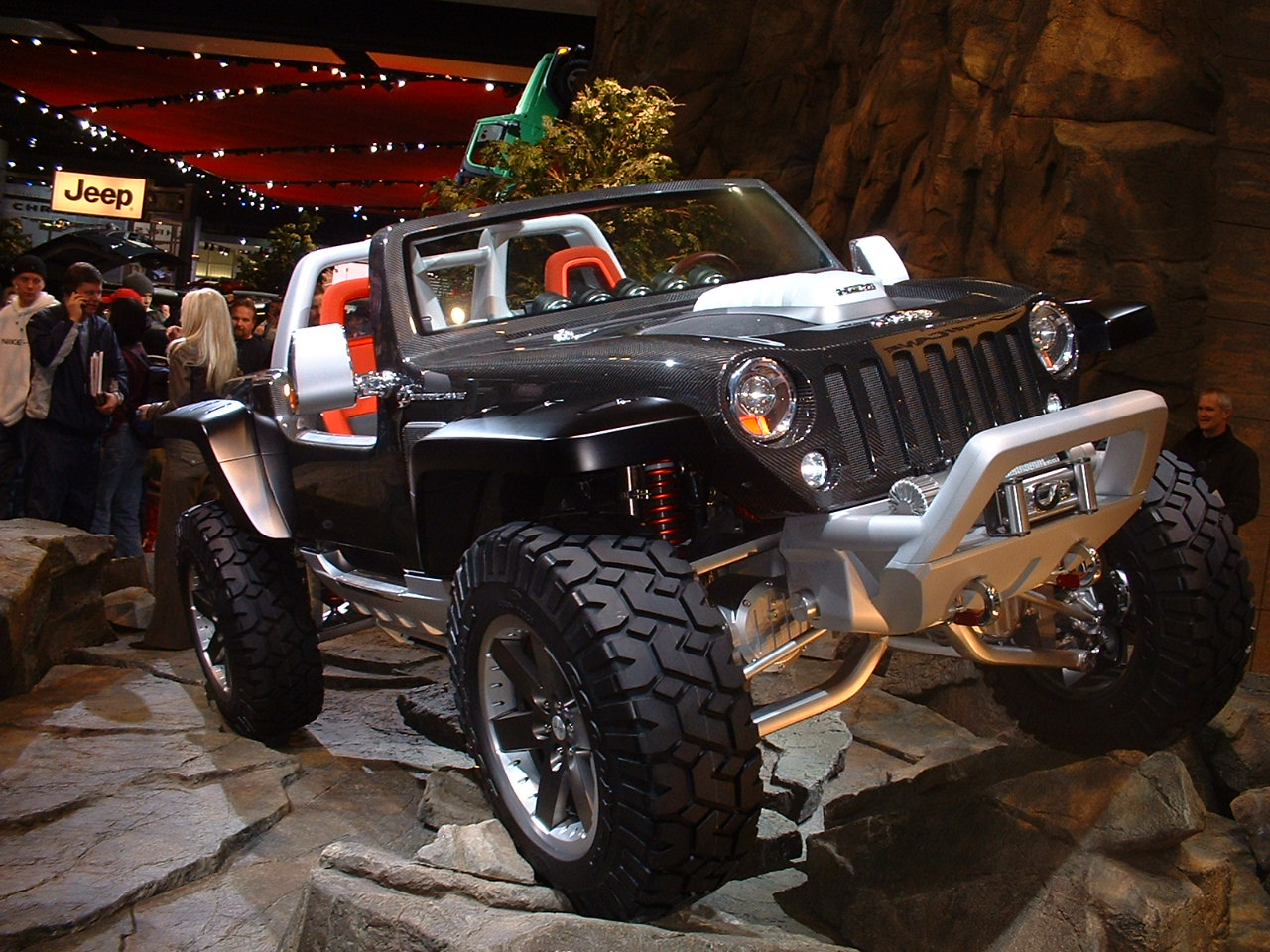
- The Jeep Hurricane at the 2005 NAIAS

Overview
- Manufacturer: Jeep
- Production: 2005
- Designer: Aaron Pizzuti (lead exterior designer)

Body and chassis
- Class: Concept car

Powertrain
- Engine: Twin 5.7 L Hemi V8 engines
- Transmission: 5-speed automatic

Dimensions
- Wheelbase: 2,746 mm (108.1 in)
- Length: 3,856 mm (151.8 in)
- Width: 2,032 mm (80.0 in)
- Height: 1,732 mm (68.2 in)
- Curb weight: 3,850 lb (1,746 kg) (estimated)

The Jeep Hurricane is a bespoke custom concept vehicle that was unveiled at the 2005 North American International Auto Show in Detroit by American automaker Jeep. Its principal exterior designer was Aaron Pizzuti. The concept went on to win IDEA Silver Award, a Popular Science "Best of what's new" award, and an Autoweek Editor's Choice award in the "Most Fun" category.

== Specifications ==
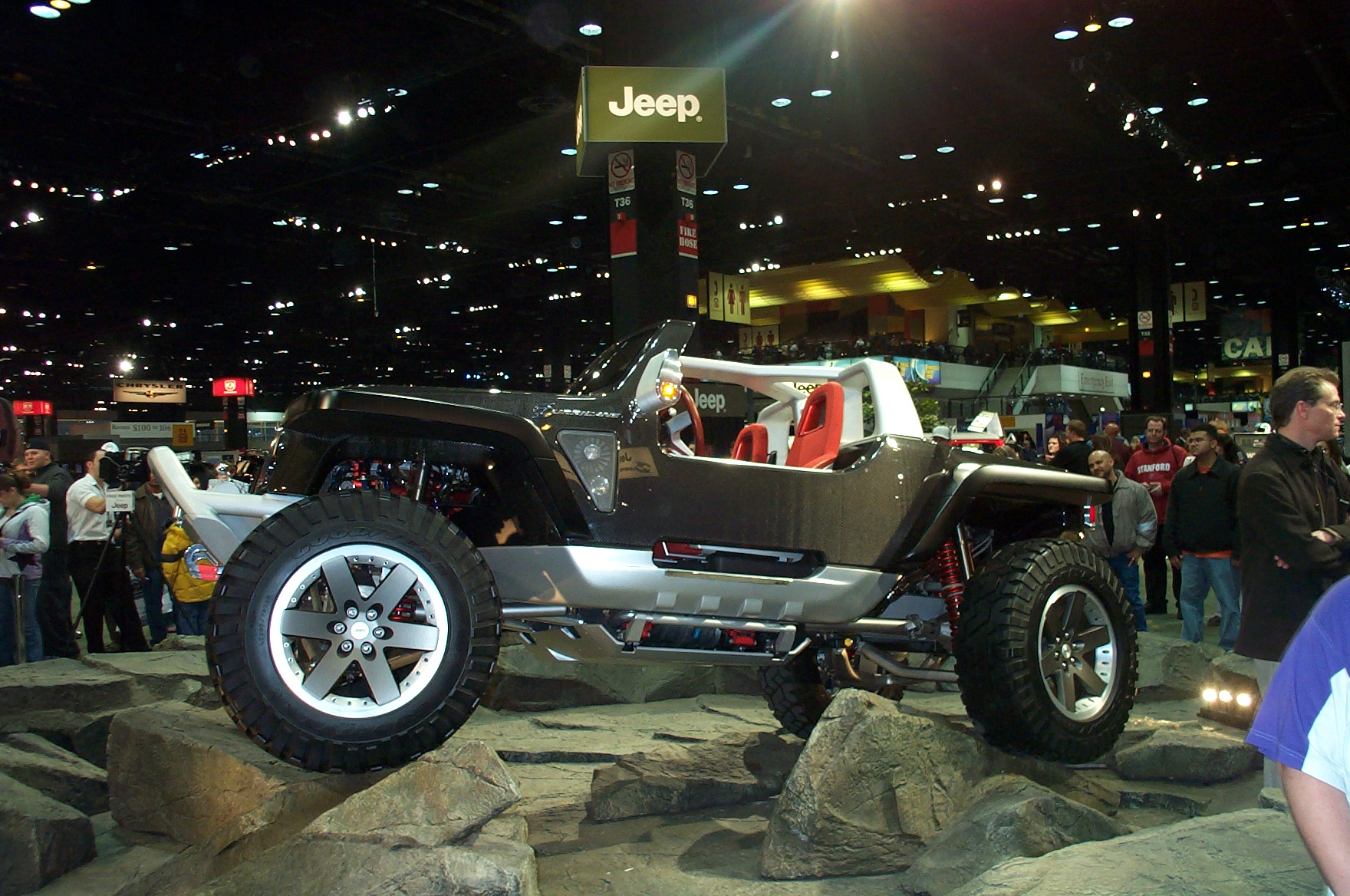
Jeep Hurricane at the 2005 North American International Auto Show

The Hurricane is powered by twin 5.7 L HEMI V8 engines which each produce 335 hp (250 kW; 340 PS) and 370 lb⋅ft (502 N⋅m) of torque, for a total of 670 hp (500 kW; 679 PS) and 740 lb⋅ft (1,003 N⋅m) of torque. Power is sent to all 4 wheels through a 5-speed automatic transmission. The Hurricane is equipped with automatic cylinder deactivation for both engines, which deactivates cylinders in sets of 4, allowing the Hurricane to run on 16, 12, 8 or 4 of its total cylinders. It is capable of accelerating from 0-60 mph (0–97 km/h) in 4.9 seconds. The Hurricane features a Chrysler designed and patented four-wheel steering system, which was outsourced to MillenWorks, and features two selectable modes. The first mode turns all 4 wheels in the same direction, allowing the Hurricane to move sideways. The second mode allows it to turn the front and back sets of wheels in opposite directions at equal angles, achieving a turning radius of zero feet (ZTR) and allowing the Hurricane to drive in a circle while staying in one spot. The Hurricane's one-piece body is composed largely of light-weight structural carbon fiber. Its skid plate is an aluminum spine that connects the chassis to the underside of the vehicle. The Hurricane doesn't have side doors or a roof, and there is only seating for two people. The driver and passenger enter the vehicle over bulkheads on each side.

== Dimensions ==
- Front overhang: 25.0 inches (635 mm)
- Rear overhang: 18.7 inches (475 mm)
- Track, front/rear: 67.5/67.5 inches (1,715/1,715 mm)
- Transfer case: custom multi-mode with 1:1, 2:1 and 4:1 ratios
- Front and rear suspension: long-travel, short/long arm independent
- Ground clearance: 14.3 inches (363 mm)
- Break-over angle: 31.5 degrees
- Approach/depart angle: 64.0/86.7 degrees
- Tire size: 305/70R20 (all four)
- Wheel size: 20x10 inches (51x25 cm)
