= Shadow RST-V =

The Shadow RST-V (Reconnaissance, Surveillance, Targeting-Vehicle) was a reconnaissance vehicle program developed by General Dynamics Land Systems (GDLS) for the United States Marine Corps Warfighting Laboratory. The program was sponsored by the Defense Advanced Research Projects Agency (DARPA) and the Office of Naval Research (ONR).

== History ==
In 1997, GDLS and Lockheed Martin Missiles and Fire Control were awarded a contract by ONR and DARPA to develop a new reconnaissance vehicle to replace M151 and Humvee in service with the United States Marine Corps. In 1999, GDLS was awarded a contract to build four demonstrator vehicles with an option for 39 more. These vehicles were delivered in 2002 with a Limited User Evaluation at the Yuma Proving Ground in Arizona in 2004.

In May 2005, GDLS was awarded a contract to upgrade the RST-V with a 30 kW export capability from the power generated by the vehicle's hybrid electric drive to power an operations center and radars.

The vehicle was not selected for the United States Army Joint Light Tactical Vehicle program (JLTV) to replace the Humvee in 2006. In 2015, the Oshkosh Corporation L-ATV (Light Combat Tactical All-Terrain Vehicle) was awarded the winner of the program. The JLTV achieved initial operating capability with the Marine Corps in 2019.

== Requirements ==
The RST-V was intended to perform deep strike and deep reconnaissance missions while being equipped to serve as a forward observer, forward air controller, reconnaissance, light strike, battlefield ambulance, air defense, logistics, personnel carrier and command post. It was required to anti-armor and mortar weapons.

== Design ==
The Shadow had an aluminum body with optional armor packages to provide protection against small arms and mines. The four-man crew area was protected by bulletproof glass on the front and sides. The vehicle had two doors on the sides and a ramp at the back to access the internal cargo area. The base of the vehicle is designed to be arched to allow it to move over the ramp of an aircraft and to improve the ability to cross obstacles. The vehicle was fitted with a pneumatic suspension to allow the tires to be pulled in from a 79 in footprint to 62 in and the height to be dropped so the base of the vehicle is 0.1 m off the ground.

The vehicle could be carried in Sikorsky CH-53 Sea Stallion and Boeing Vertol CH-46 Sea Knight helicopters, Bell Boeing V-22 Osprey tiltrotors and a Lockheed C-130 Hercules aircraft. Up to 21 vehicles could be in a Lockheed C-5 Galaxy and up to 12 could be carried in a Boeing C-17 Globemaster III.

=== Armament ===
The Shadow RST-V could be equipped with a 7.62 mm machine gun, 12.7 mm machine gun, 40 mm grenade launcher, Objective Crew Served Weapon (OCSW), FGM-148 Javelin or BGM-71 TOW. It could also be equipped with a defensive suite consisting of radars and laser warning receivers and missile warning systems.

=== Surveillance ===
The Shadow RST-V could be equipped an electro-optical sensors on a 3 m extending mast developed by General Dynamics Canada that provided a dual field of view day and thermal imaging sensors. Additionally, it was equipped with a Northrop Grumman Lightweight Laser Designator and Ranger (LLDR). The sensor suite was linked to an Inertial navigation system (INS) and the Global Positioning System (GPS) with a Smiths Industries direction finder. The communications system included an ITT SINCGARS ASIIIP VHF transponder.

=== Propulsion ===
The Shadow RST-V had a Hybrid vehicle drivetrain based on a 114 kW-rated Detroit Diesel type 2.5-liter DI-4V front mounted turbocharged, intercooled common-rail direct-injection diesel engine. The diesel engine powered a 100 kW Renk Magnet-Motor generator that drove four 50 kW permanent magnetic hub motors mounted on each of the wheel hubs. The power generation unit includes two 20 kWh Saft Li-Ion batteries with a peak power output of 80 kW and can be charged by the diesel engine. In stealth mode, the vehicle can be powered only by the battery to reduce its acoustic and thermal signature.

The vehicle can be operated in hybrid mode using power from both the diesel engine and the battery pack during maneuvers requiring rapid acceleration, maximum torque for steep gradients. The vehicle had a demonstrated maximum road speed of 112 km/h. Its 95-liter fuel tank allowed for an unrefueled range of 758 km at 50 km/h. and 32 km using only the battery pack.
