= MillenWorks =

MillenWorks (Textron)
- Industry: Motorsport; Automotive engineering
- Founded: 1980
- Headquarters: Tustin, California, U.S.
- Key people: Rod Millen (founder)

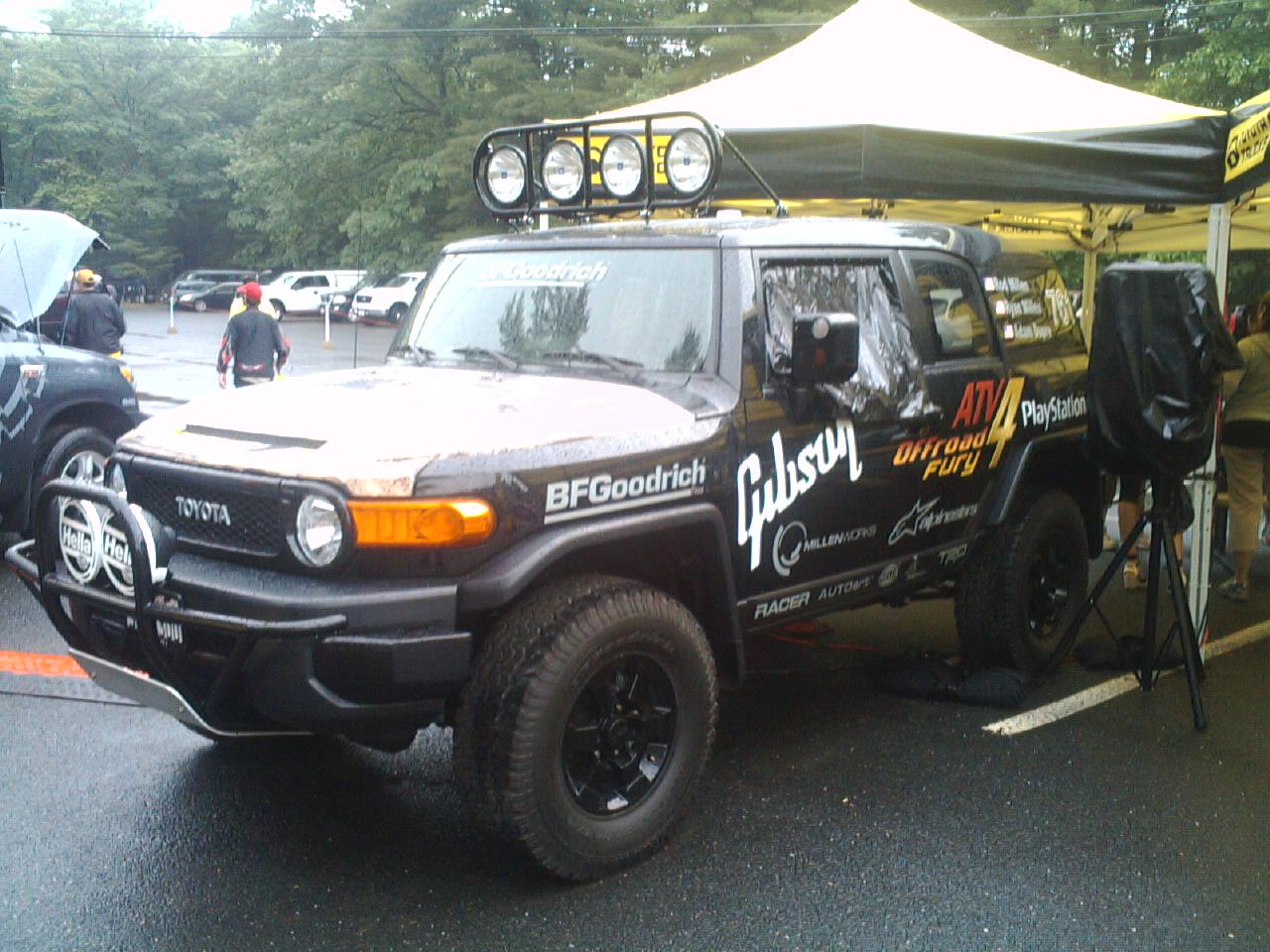
2006 Baja 1000 MillenWorks vehicle

MillenWorks, known as Rod Millen Motorsports until 2005, was an American automotive technology company started by Rod Millen in 1980. The company began by preparing Millen's rally cars, and evolved into designing and building them. The company developed vehicles, high performance auto parts, and technology for racing, concept cars, and the US military.

MillenWorks was acquired by Textron in 2011.

== Race cars ==
Some of the first cars designed and built by the company were the Pikes Peak Toyota Celica and Toyota Tacoma which Millen drove to overall victories in the Pikes Peak International Hill Climb in 1994, 1996, 1997, 1998, and 1999. Other cars include the Championship Off-Road Racing Pro 4 Toyota Tundra and the SCORE Toyota FJ Cruiser which competed in the Baja 1000.

== Concept cars ==
MillenWorks was often contracted to develop technologies for upcoming concept cars. They developed the revolutionary drivetrain seen on the Jeep Hurricane, which allows it to spin in place using independent four wheel steering. They also developed the hybrid electric four wheel drive system seen on the Ralliart Mitsubishi Eclipse concept car, and many of the mechanisms seen on the Scion Fuse. Other projects included the Chrysler ME Four-Twelve, Lexus IS430, Porsche Carrera GT Concept, Toyota Ultimate Celica, Lexus Streetrod, and the Toyota Retrocruiser.

== Military vehicles ==
MillenWorks also developed manned and unmanned ground vehicles and technology for the military, such as the MillenWorks Light Utility Vehicle. With Lord Corporation, they also developed an active magneto rheological suspension for the U.S. Army's Stryker, which was tested at the Yuma Proving Grounds. They teamed with Lockheed Martin on several other projects, including the RST-V, unmanned ground combat vehicle, Gladiator tactical unmanned ground vehicle, and the multifunctional utility/logistics and equipment (Mule) vehicle. They also developed diesel-electric drivetrains for the HMMWV, which were tested at the Aberdeen Proving Ground.

== Gallery ==
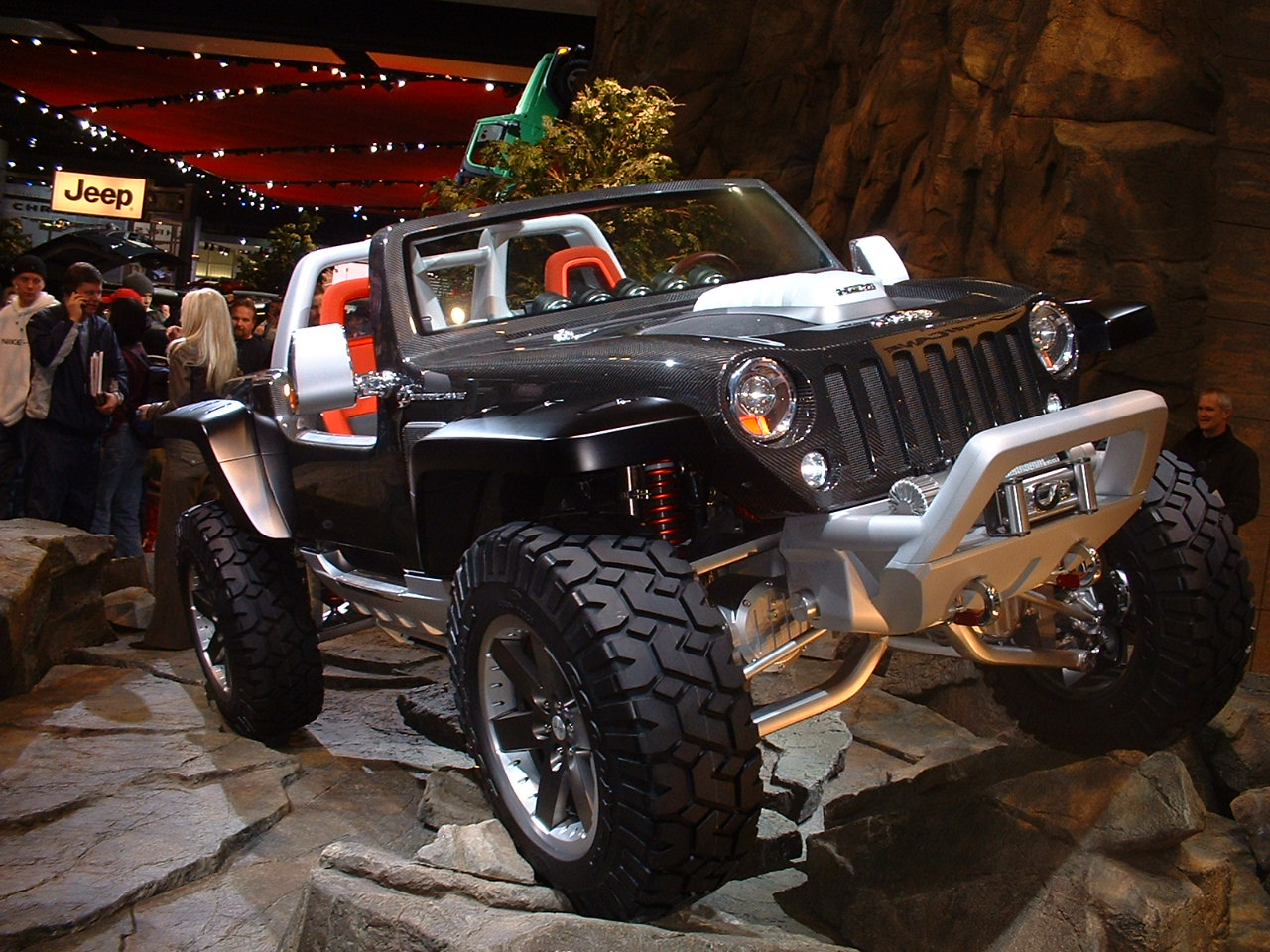
The Jeep Hurricane

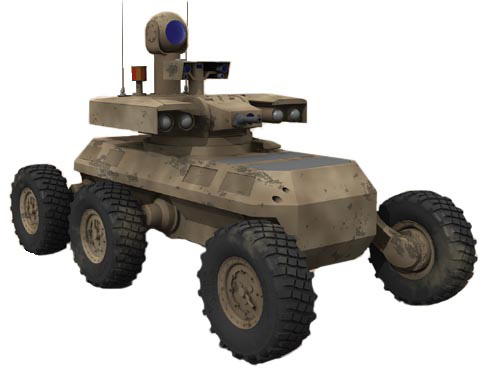
The unmanned Multifunctional Utility/Logistics and Equipment Vehicle

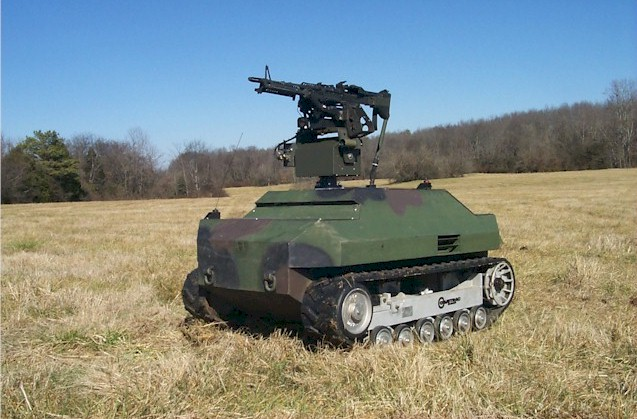
The Gladiator tactical unmanned ground vehicle

== Performance parts ==
It also developed automotive performance parts for the Mazda Miata, and cooperated with Toyota Racing Development on parts for the Toyota Celica and Lexus IS300.
