= AM General BRV-O =

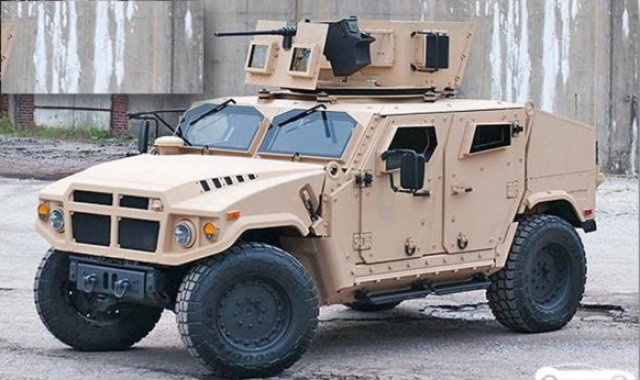
- AM General BRV-O JLTV prototype.
- Type: light tactical vehicle
- Place of origin: United States

Production history
- Designer: AM General
- Variants: Combat Tactical Vehicle (CTV); Combat Support Vehicle (CSV)

Specifications
- Secondary armament: up to four M7 smoke grenade dischargers
- Engine: Diesel
- Operational range: 300 mi (480 km)
- Maximum speed: Forward; Road: 70 mph Off road: varies Reverse: 8 mph

The AM General BRV-O (Blast Resistant Vehicle - Off road) competed in an original field of six vehicle designs as part of the JLTV Joint Light Tactical Vehicle program that will replace the Humvee. AM General designed the BRV-O JLTV to provide better protection, performance, payload, transportability, reliability and affordability than the current Humvee.

In August 2012, the Army and Marine Corps selected the BRV-O as one of three designs for the Engineering and Manufacturing Development (EMD) phase of the program. Also selected were designs offered by Lockheed Martin and Oshkosh.

Oshkosh's L-ATV was selected as the winner of the JLTV program on 25 August 2015. The company was awarded a $6.75 billion low rate initial base contract with eight options to procure the first 16,901 vehicles for both the Army and Marines. The current JLTV procurement objective stands at 53,582 vehicles - 49,099 vehicles for the U.S. Army and 4,483 vehicles for the U.S. Marine Corps. On 8 September 2015, AM General announced it would not protest the decision.

The Pentagon Operational Test & Evaluation Office released a report of how each JLTV prototype performed in a Limited User Test (LUT) in February 2016, finding that the BRV-O would “require a significant redesign” to meet threshold force protection requirements, and it had reliability problems demonstrating 526 "Mean Miles Between Operational Mission Failure," compared to 2,968 miles for the Humvee and 7,051 for the winning L-ATV.

== See also ==
- Joint Light Tactical Vehicle
- Oshkosh L-ATV
