= Future Tactical Truck System =

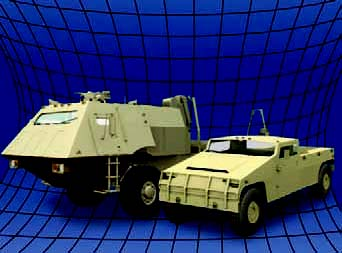
- Artist impression
- Type: Utility vehicle
- Place of origin: United States

The Future Tactical Truck System (FTTS) was a United States Armed Forces program for which the Operational Requirements Document was drawn up during 2003. FTTS was a proposed two vehicle modular family that was to replace the AM General High Mobility Multipurpose Wheeled Vehicle (HMMWV (the Humvee)), Family of Medium Tactical Vehicles (FMTV), Oshkosh M977 Heavy Expanded Mobility Tactical Truck (HEMTT), Palletized Load System (PLS) (in certain echelons), and all remaining M35, M809 and M939 series of 2.5 and 5 ton trucks. The FTTS-UV (Utility Vehicle) was to replace the HMMWV, while the FTTS-MSV (Manoeuvre Sustainment Vehicle) was to replace all other types.

By 2006 work on FTTS was faltering and according to the foreword of Jane's Military Vehicles and Logistics 2006-2007 by Shaun C Connors and Christopher F Foss (ISBN 978-0710627612): "The U.S. Army’s original intention was that the FTTS (the logistic support for the Future Combat System (FCS)) with just two variants would eventually replace virtually all of the current tactical wheeled vehicle fleet. In a more realistic approach, the current FTTS-MSV/UV Advanced Concept Technology Demonstration (ACTD) efforts (with input from other efforts) will now be used ‘to define requirements’ for future U.S. Army trucks."

The Association of the United States Army (July 2006) "Army Tactical Wheeled Vehicle Strategy: Meeting Current and Future Needs" pdf stated that the ACTD for FTTS was taking a two phase approach; the first phase involved modeling and simulation (M&S) efforts in which multiple vendors presented concepts for technologies to be incorporated into designs for the UV and MSV variants of FTTS. The second phase included awards to three of the M&S contractors to manufacture prototype designs: two contractors to produce their UV version with trailer, and one contractor to produce two MSVs with companion trailers. All vehicles and trailers were to be evaluated in a Military Utility Assessment (MUA) at Fort Lewis, Washington. The MUA was scheduled to occur during the first and second quarters of FY07, with the results to fed into the requirements development process, this to define future truck requirements.

Elements of FTTS-UV ACTD were fed in to the ongoing Joint Light Tactical Vehicle (JLTV) program, this the replacement for part of the HMMWV fleet. On 24 April 2006, establishment of a Joint Program Office to manage the JLTV effort was endorsed. The AUSA pdf file previously referenced stated that: "Following approval, [of the JLTV Initial Capabilities Document by the Secretary of Defense], the Future Tactical Truck Systems Advanced Concept Technology Demonstration, the PSD [Platform Systems Demonstration], EMIP [Expedited Modernization Initiative Procedure] and various Office of Naval Research Science and Technology activities will inform the requirements process, thus ensuring requirements are realistic, achievable and relevant to all services.

Deliveries of the medium and heavy category trucks in production when FTTS commenced, and to be replaced by FTTS, continue. The FMTV (now with Oshkosh) production contract has recently been extended to September 2016, and award of the Family of Heavy Tactical Vehicles IV (FHTV) contract, on a sole source basis to Oshkosh, is anticipated in the near future. FHTV contract awards include HEMTT and PLS.

== History ==
To evaluate possible future truck systems and designs, the U.S. Army's Tank-automotive and Armaments Command refereed the Future Tactical Truck Systems - Advanced Concepts and Technology Demonstration (ACTD) program. Navistar International and Lockheed Martin's proposals, the International FTTS and Lockheed FTTS Utility Vehicles were selected, as well as the Armor Holdings proposal for the MSV. In August 2006 they were tested at the Aberdeen Proving Grounds. Following this evaluation they were parked in The Pentagon courtyard for evaluation by higher-ranking military officials."

International Truck's proposal for FTTS utilized a Parallel Hybrid Drivetrain and modular armor. It has undergone testing by 5th Brigade, 2nd Infantry Division and 14th Engineer Battalion at the Aberdeen Proving Grounds and Fort Lewis, along with Lockheed Martin's design and Armor Holdings' Maneuver Sustainment Vehicle.

== Variants ==
=== Utility Vehicle ===
==== UV1 ====
FTTS-UV Support
FTTS-UV Ambulance
FTTS-UV C2

==== UV2 ====
FTTS-UV Support

== See also ==
- Joint Light Tactical Vehicle
