= BAE Systems Valanx =

Valanx
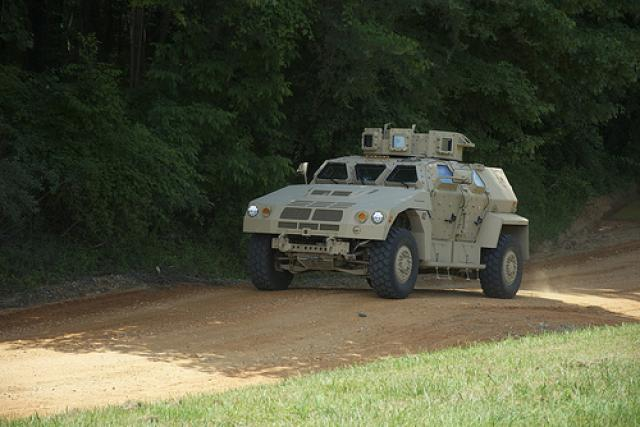
- The Valanx during the JLTV Technology Development phase.
- Type: Survivable Light Armored Vehicle, 4-door truck
- Place of origin: United States

Production history
- Manufacturer: BAE Systems Inc.

Specifications
- Secondary armament: up to four M7 smoke grenade dischargers
- Engine: v8 ford pw stroke 6 7 L
- Operational range: 300 miles (480 km)
- Maximum speed: Forward; Road: 70 mph (110 km/h); Off road: varies Reverse: 8 mph (13 km/h)

The BAE Systems Valanx was one of six competitors for a Joint Light Tactical Vehicle that will supplement the Humvee. The Valanx featured lightweight advanced armour and a V-hull for crew protection. It was developed with Navistar.

The Valanx was not selected for the Engineering and Manufacturing Development (EMD) phase of the program.
