= General Tactical Vehicles JLTV Eagle =

General Tactical Vehicles JLTV
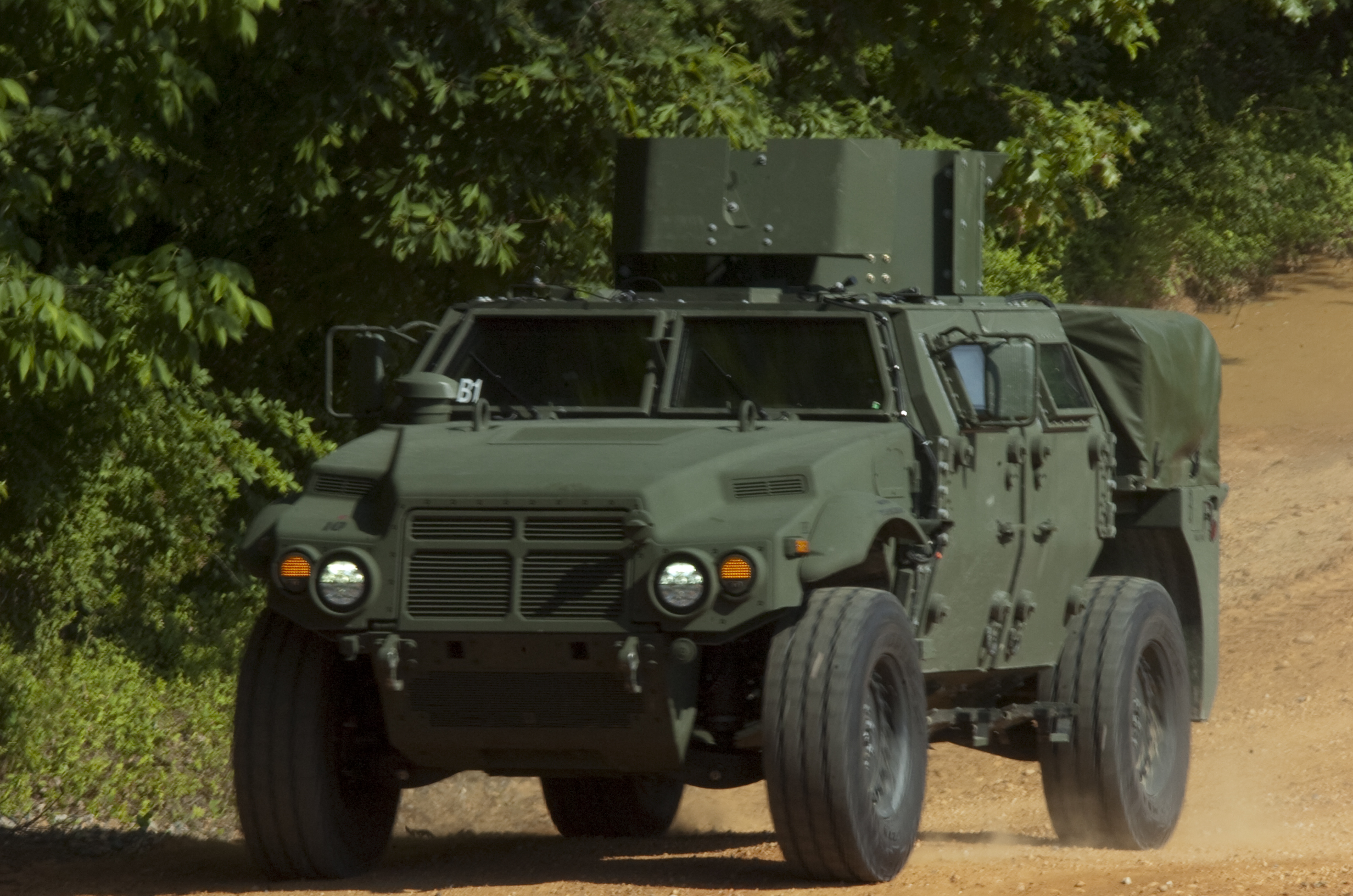
- JLTV during the Technology Development phase.
- Type: 4-wheeled armored fighting vehicle
- Place of origin: United States

Production history
- Designer: General Tactical Vehicles
- Variants: A:, B:, C:,

Specifications
- Secondary armament: up to four M7 smoke grenade dischargers
- Operational range: 300 miles
- Maximum speed: Forward; Road: 70 mph Off road: varies Reverse: 8 mph

The General Tactical Vehicles JLTV Eagle (Joint Light Tactical Vehicle) was one of six competitors for a Joint Light Tactical Vehicle that will replace the Humvee. The Eagle JLTV was to provide more protection and performance than the current Humvee. The JLTV Eagle was not selected for the Engineering and Manufacturing Development (EMD) phase of the program.
