= Lockheed Martin JLTV =

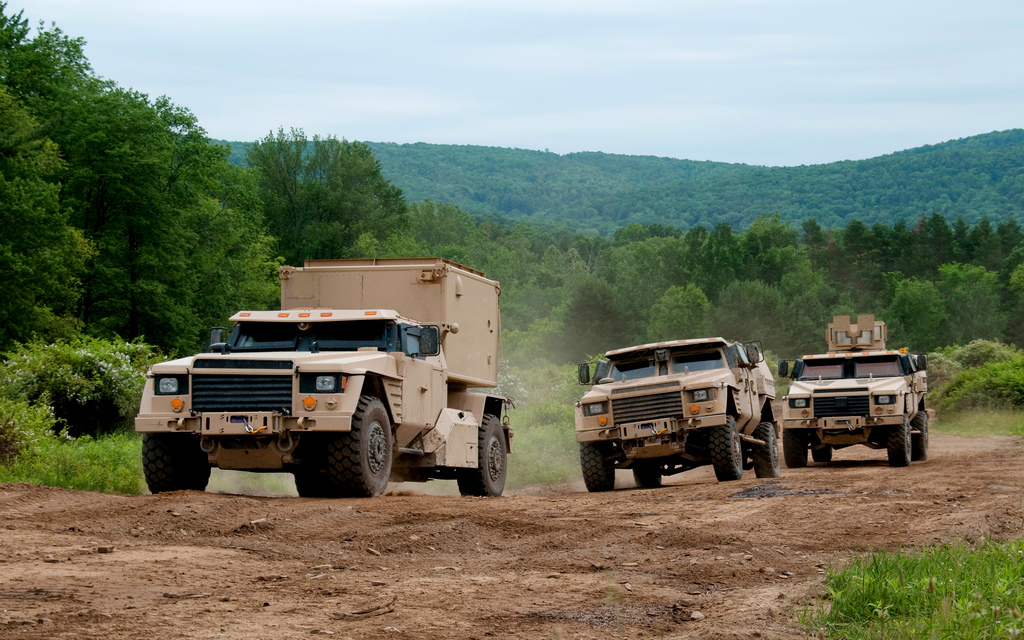
- JLTV three variants during the Technology Development phase.
- Type: light tactical vehicle
- Place of origin: United States

Production history
- Designer: Lockheed Martin
- Variants: A:, B:, C: (original), Combat Tactical Vehicle (CTV) and Combat Support Vehicle (CSV) (final)

Specifications
- Mass: 7,030 kg (15,500 lb)
- Armor: A-kit/B-kit (classified)
- Main armament: 7.62mm or 12.7mm machine gun
- Secondary armament: up to four M7 smoke grenade dischargers
- Engine: Cummins 4-cylinder diesel
- Transmission: Allison
- Suspension: Meritor ProTec HMIS (air, variable ride height))
- Operational range: 650 km (400 mi)
- Maximum speed: Forward; Road: 105 km/h (65 mph); Off road: varies

The Lockheed Martin JLTV (Joint Light Tactical Vehicle) is a prototype armor-capable vehicle that was one of six original competitors for a Joint Light Tactical Vehicle that will replace the Humvee. The JLTV goal was to provide a family of vehicles able to perform multiple missions protected, sustained and networked mobility for personnel and payload over a full range of operations. Lockheed's JLTV design lost out to the Oshkosh L-ATV in August 2015.

== Design ==
The Lockheed JLTV vehicles were powered by a Cummins diesel engine coupled to an Allison Transmission. The engine was the primary source of electrical and could provide external power for dismounted users. It could sustain top speeds exceeding 70 mph (110 km/h), ford 60 in (1.5 m) of salt or fresh water, and had a gross weight of 24,000 lb (11,000 kg). The four-cylinder engine had a fuel efficiency of as much as 14 miles per gallon, better than some SUVs. The system did not have an alternator, but instead used an in-line power generator capable of producing 24 kW of electricity, which could be scaled up to as much as 75 kW.

In August 2012, Meritor Inc. announced they would be integrating their ProTec High Mobility Independent Suspension (HMIS) into the Lockheed JLTV in response to its moving on to the EMD phase of testing. Meritor designed the ProTec Series 30 HMIS to provide enhanced off-road maneuverability and ride quality. Meritor asserted that the system underwent thorough testing, totaling over 100,000 miles of travel. The independent air suspension offered 16 in (410 mm) of travel and greatly reduced crew fatigue through a smoother ride over terrain.

The vehicle had an improved V-hull to protect from underbody blasts. It had standard armor protection and could accommodate add-on armor kits. In October 2011, Lockheed announced their JLTV met standards for IED-protected vehicles in government blast tests, providing the level of protection with 40 percent less weight than currently deployed all-terrain mine-protected vehicles. Its underbody used a modified V-hull called a "cursive W"-shaped hull that was effective in dissipating blasts forward, aft, and out to the sides.

The internal cab had been designed similar to that of a cockpit to make use of all available space. It was made to be ergonomic with capabilities integrated into the dashboard to free up space for the operators to be able to perform their missions. All vehicle variants were the same from the driver's seat forward.

The base vehicle had no specific armament configuration, but could be fitted with a 7.62 mm or 12.7 mm machine gun. Lockheed and Moog Inc. joined to develop the Common Hellfire Package (CHP) to enable the firing of AGM-114 Hellfire missiles from various platforms. The CHP has been test fired from a stationary trailer-mounted pedestal that could be towed behind the Lockheed JLTV. The vehicle also fired Direct Attack Guided Rockets from a pedestal launcher mounted in the bed. The JLTV's ability to integrate these systems would provide troops greater firepower, with the intent being to reduce the need to call for aviation support.

Vehicles for the EMD phase were manufactured at BAE Systems' facility in Sealy, Texas. On 16 October 2013, Lockheed announced production would be moved to their assembly line in Camden, Arkansas. The new manufacturing complex was expected to give better production efficiency and cost reductions. BAE remained a partner on the Lockheed Martin JLTV team, providing integrated cabs, protection solutions, and vehicle manufacturing. BAE's Sealy facility was shut down by June 2014. The Lockheed JLTV passed the government's Manufacturing Readiness Assessment (MRA) from 18–19 November 2013, allowing it to be manufactured at the Camden facility.

== History ==
In October 2008, Lockheed won a 27-month contract to continue technology development in the JLTV program. In April 2010, Lockheed delivered the first two of seven operational JLTVs and one companion trailer to the US Army and Marine Corps for the Technology Development (TD) phase testing.

On 23 August 2012, the JLTV program selected Lockheed and two other companies as winners of the Engineering and Manufacturing Development (EMD) phase of the program. Lockheed won a contract to produce 22 prototype vehicles in 27 months for evaluation.

The Lockheed JLTV family underwent a design understanding review from 18–20 December 2012. The government design review assessed all elements of the design and confirmed its overall maturity and requirements compliance. Lockheed used a production-enhanced model, which was lighter and cheaper than the earlier technology demonstration model. By then, the Lockheed JLTV design had over 160,000 combined testing miles. Vehicles produced for the EMD phase of the program began deliveries in spring 2013.

On 21 February 2013, Lockheed demonstrated the ability of their JLTV to fire Hydra 70 rockets. One DAGR rocket and two unguided Hydra rockets were launched from a pedestal launcher mounted on the JLTV prototype. DAGR locked onto the laser spot two seconds after launch, flew 5 km (3.1 mi) down range and impacted the target within 1 meter of the laser spot. The unguided Hydra 70 rockets were launched down the center of the range, and flew 521 and 2,600 meters. The purpose of the test was to show the capability of the DAGR for ground combat and the ability of the JLTV to launch it.

On 26 June 2013, the last of 22 Lockheed JLTVs produced for the EMD phase rolled off the production line. Long-term testing and evaluation was scheduled for August 22. On 14 August 2013, Lockheed delivered their 22 vehicles to the Army and Marine Corps. Lockheed JLTVs went through over 160,000 combined test miles during technology development.

On 27 August 2013, the Army and Marine Corps announced that full-scale testing of JLTV prototypes would begin the following week, with all three vendors having had 66 vehicles delivered. Each company delivered 22 vehicles and six trailers to Aberdeen Proving Ground, Maryland, and Yuma Proving Ground, Arizona. Previous testing had already put the vehicles through more than 400 ballistic and blast tests on armor testing samples, underbody blast testing, and more than 1,000 miles in shakedown testing. Soldiers from the Army Test and Evaluation Command and personnel from the Defense Department's Office of Test and Evaluation would begin to put the vehicles through realistic and rigorous field testing during 14 months of government performance testing. Testing was to be completed by FY 2015, with a production contract to be awarded to a single vendor for nearly 55,000 vehicles. On 3 September 2013, full-pace, full-scope JLTV testing began at Aberdeen Proving Ground, Yuma, and Redstone Arsenal, Alabama. The program was on track despite sequestration. One vendor was to be selected by July 2015.

On 21 April 2014, Lockheed announced that their JLTV entry had surpassed 100,000 miles in government testing.

Oshkosh's L-ATV was selected as the winner of the JLTV program on 25 August 2015, and was awarded a $6.75 billion low rate initial base contract with eight options to procure the first 16,901 vehicles for both the Army and Marines. Based on accounts from those involved in the JLTV program, Lockheed lost not because of the technical merit or design of its vehicle, but because it was the only contractor that had not demonstrated the ability to build tens of thousands of trucks on a production line. Lockheed's JLTV also demonstrated 1,271 "Mean Miles Between Operational Mission Failure" in a Limited User Test (LUT), compared to 2,968 miles for the Humvee and 7,051 for the winning L-ATV. On 8 September it was disclosed that Lockheed Martin would protest the award to Oshkosh, the same day that AM General decided not to file a protest. On 15 December 2015, the Government Accountability Office (GAO) dismissed Lockheed's protest as Lockheed also filed a claim with the US Court of Federal Claims. Lockheed then attempted to file a preliminary injunction with the U.S. Court of Federal Claims on 17 December, but announced they had withdrawn their protest on 17 February 2016.

== Variants ==
Original

- Category A - General purpose mobility, logistics support
- Category B - Infantry carrier, command and control
- Category C - Utility

Final

- Combat Tactical Vehicle (CTV)
- Combat Support Vehicle (CSV)

== See also ==
- Joint Light Tactical Vehicle
- Oshkosh L-ATV
