= Multi Role Vehicle-Protected =

Vehicle programme of the British Army

The Multi Role Vehicle-Protected (MRV-P) is a programme to deliver future wheeled utility and logistics vehicles for the British Army.

The vehicle formed part of the projected future equipment for the army as envisaged in the Army 2020 programme, the name given to the restructuring of the British Army in light of the Strategic Defence and Security Review 2010.

== Background ==
The MRV-P programme originated from the Operational Utility Vehicle System. This plan would:

provide a robust, easily supported system, comprising operational utility vehicles that are able to carry light cargo (up to six tonnes)

or small groups of personnel, integrate as many special-to-role systems as possible and which can operate in diverse climatic and topographical conditions worldwide, in order to support and contribute to land

(including land air) and littoral manoeuvre operations’.

However, as reported by the National Audit Office in its 2011 Major Reports, the Operational Utility Vehicle System was cancelled in 2011 and the requirement was re-scoped to form the MRV-P programme. The concept phase supposedly was completed by early spring 2015.

== Characteristics of the MRV-P ==
A Public Sector Tenders tenders report stated that:

[The] Multi Role Vehicle Protected (MRV-P) is a Cat A project intended to meet the requirement for a protected deployable platform employed by all Force Elements, at all scales of effort, in a wide range of environments, and on all parts of the battlefield except for the direct fire zone. The MRV-P should bring commonality to the fleet and reduce the logistic footprint for utility vehicles by 2020.

The requirement was further explained in a presentation by then Brigadier PS Rafferty. The presentation explained that MRV-P vehicles would deploy in the Divisional Support Area in future British Army divisions. MRV-P would have four variants: command and liaison with a four-person seating, a command and control variant that could expand and deploy statically and fit up to six personnel, a logistics transport variant for two personnel and a troop carrier variant with a driver, commander and six dismounts. The presentation further stated that the MRV-P variants would replace the following vehicles in the British Army once they reached their out-of-service dates, although this has yet to be confirmed:

- Ocelot/Foxhound (to be replaced by the troop carrier variant)
- Husky (to be replaced by the logistics transport variant)
- Panther (to be replaced by the command & liaison/command & control variant)
- WMIK
- Vector

In February 2016, a Europa Supplies contract indicated that the Ministry of Defence requested for two variants: a Troop Carrying Vehicle (TCV) and a Future Protected Battlefield Ambulance (FPBFA). The TCV would sit: 1 x Driver; 1 x Commander; and 6 x Seated Passengers. The FPBFA would sit: 1 x Driver; 1 x Commander; 6 x Personnel or a combination of permanent seating for 2 x Medical Attendants seated at the head of the stretcher and ability to transport 2 stretchered casualties or 1 stretchered casualty and 3 Seated Casualties and combinations thereof. The dimensions would be of maximum width 2,500 mm and maximum height of 2,650 mm (in transit mode). It "must be capable of being transported by land, sea and air (including but not limited to A400M and C17) with minimal preparation. There is [however] no requirement to transport under slung by rotary wing aircraft." The two variants must have more than a medium Mobility load carrying classification and they must protect the occupants from ballistic threat at more than Stanag Level 2 and blast threat at more than Stanag Level 2.

== Bidders ==
In September 2015, IHS Janes reported that General Dynamics offered two different variants for the MRV-P programme. One was the General Dynamics European Land Systems Mowag Eagle V in the 4x4 and 6x6 configurations. Another option was the General Dynamics Land Systems UK (previously Force Protection) Ocelot 4x4 which was already in British Army service. In June 2016, Defense News reported that the British MOD was in talks with the US Defense Department about purchasing the Oshkosh L-ATV or the Joint Light Tactical Vehicle for Package 1 of the MRV-P programme. With respect to Package 2, the report also noted that the RMMV Survivor R is also one of the five downselected for this requirement, the remaining other contenders being BAE SYSTEMS, General Dynamics UK, Mercedes Benz, Thales UK. A possible sale of 2,747 JLTV vehicles was notified in July 2017.
