= Joint Light Tactical Vehicle =

Military light utility/combat multi-role vehicle

Joint Light Tactical Vehicle (JLTV)
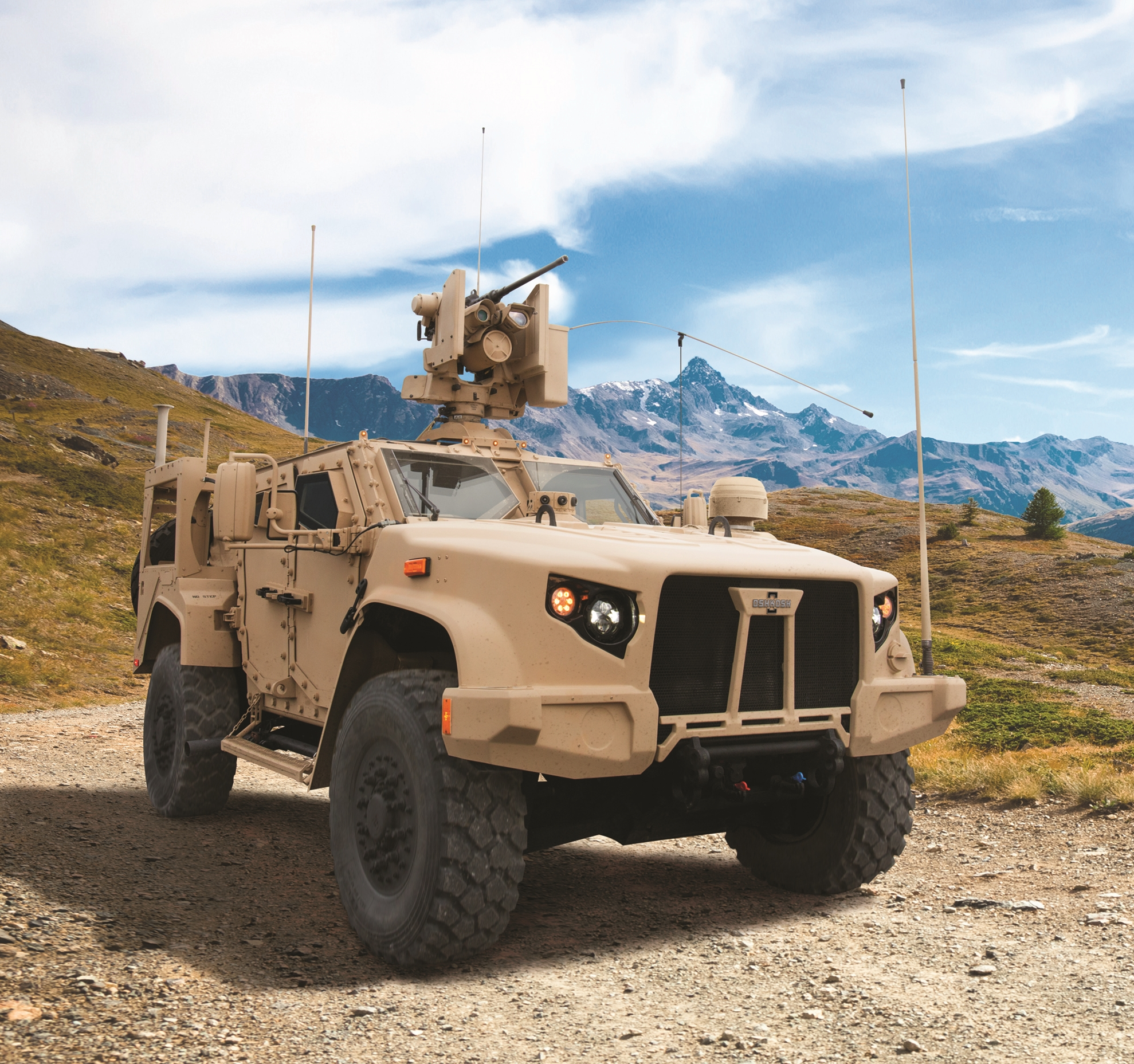
- Oshkosh L-ATV in M1278 Heavy Guns Carrier JLTV configuration and equipped with M153 CROWS II remote weapon system integrated with M2 Browning .50 Caliber heavy machine gun
- Type: Light utility/combat multi-role vehicle Infantry mobility vehicle with MRAP capabilities
- Place of origin: United States

Service history
- In service: January 2019 – present
- Used by: United States Army; United States Marine Corps; United States Air Force
- Wars: Gaza war

Production history
- Designer: Oshkosh
- Designed: 2011
- Manufacturer: Oshkosh (JLTV A1); AM General (JLTV A2)
- Unit cost: $370,000–399,000
- Produced: Contract placed 25 August 2015; first test JLTV delivered to Army in 2016. Full rate production transition approved in 2019
- No. built: Over 22,000 units by mid-2024
- Variants: All JLTV variants except* M1278 Heavy Guns Carrier; M1279 Utility; M1280 General Purpose; M1281 Close Combat Weapons Carrier; *L-ATV Ambulance

Specifications
- Mass: Curb weight: 14,000 lb (6,400 kg); Gross weight: 22,500 lb (10,200 kg)
- Length: 20.5 ft (6.2 m) (nominal)
- Width: 8.2 ft (2.5 m) (nominal)
- Height: 8.5 ft (2.6 m) (nominal)
- Crew: 1 + 3 in individual seats + optional gunner (1 + 1; M1279 Utility)
- Armor: Classified (A-kit/B-kit configuration)
- Main armament: A variety of light and medium caliber weapons, AGLs, or ATGMs can be fitted
- Engine: 6.6 L Gale Banks Engineering 866T V8 (based on General Motors Duramax L5P); 400 hp (298 kW; 406 PS); 850 lb⋅ft (1,152 N⋅m)
- Payload capacity: 5,100 pounds (2,300 kg) (2-door) 3,500 pounds (1,600 kg) (4-door)
- Transmission: Allison 2500SP 6-speed automatic
- Suspension: Oshkosh TAK-4i independent suspension
- Operational range: 300 miles (480 km)
- Maximum speed: Forward; Road: 70 mph (110 km/h); Off road: varies Reverse: 8 mph (13 km/h)
- Steering system: Power-assisted, front wheels

The Joint Light Tactical Vehicle (JLTV), known and marketed under Oshkosh development as the L-ATV (Light Combat Tactical All-Terrain Vehicle), is a light utility/combat multi-role vehicle. The Oshkosh-developed JLTV was selected for acquisition under the US military's Army-led Joint Light Tactical Vehicle program. In the very early stages of the program it was suggested that JLTV would replace the AM General High Mobility Multi-purpose Wheeled Vehicle (HMMWV) on a one-for-one basis. It is now suggested that the JLTV will partially replace the HMMWV.

The L-ATV was designed to deliver a level of protection comparable to that of heavier and less maneuverable Mine Resistant Ambush Protected (MRAP) class designs, these having more protection from blast than up-armored HMMWVs which they were delivered to replace on deployed operations.

In August 2015, the L-ATV was selected as the winner of the JLTV program. The first JLTV delivery order was placed in March 2016 with the U.S. Army ordering 657 examples. Overall requirements have fluctuated, but as of January 2022 were stated by Michael Sprang, JLTV Project Director to be 49,099 for the Army; approximately 12,500 for the Marine Corps; 2,000 for the Air Force (dependent on funding); and approximately 400 for the Navy.

The JLTV achieved initial operational capability (IOC) in the U.S. Marine Corps in 2019. The Army recompeted the right to manufacture the JLTV beginning with the A2 variant. In 2023, the Army selected AM General. Oshkosh expects to produce JLTVs into early 2025 and retains the right to produce JLTVs for direct commercial sale.

== History ==
=== Background ===
The idea for the Joint Light Tactical Vehicle (JLTV) first emerged in 2006 from threats experienced during the Iraq War. The primary tactical wheeled vehicle used by the U.S. military at the start of the war was the Humvee. However, most were unarmored and the type (including armored examples) incurred heavy losses when improvised explosive devices (IEDs) began being employed by insurgents. The initial response was to add armor, or more armor to armored models, and primarily on the sides. This improved side protection against direct fire and associated threats, but since the chassis was not designed to handle any further additional weight, there was little room for underbody protection. The added armor weight greatly reduced remaining useful payload capacity (within max gross weight), negatively impacted off-road mobility, compromised vehicle reliability, and greatly increased their maintenance needs (frequency, labor and parts costs).

To combat increasing numbers of IED attacks, the U.S. rapidly procured some 29,000 Mine Resistant Ambush Protected (MRAP) vehicles, including the Oshkosh M-ATV for use in Iraq and Afghanistan. While MRAPs offered superior protection from IEDs, especially underbody blasts, they were significantly larger and heavier and had relatively poor off-road mobility. The military incorporated MRAPs in response to operational needs, but never intended them to become a permanent part of their tactical wheeled vehicle fleets. At the conclusion of operations, many thousands were either scrapped, adapted for other roles, or offered for sale/transfer to allies. Ultimately U.S. armed forces would retain over 11,100 MRAPS, just over 6,350 of these Oshkosh M-ATVs.

Since up-armoring Humvees and buying MRAPs addressed specific issues but created gaps in vehicle capabilities, the JLTV program was started to incorporate lessons learned and balance payload, mobility, and protection into a new vehicle. Its purpose was to restore the mobility commanders had with the original Humvee, while having the side and underbody protection of a basic MRAP. It would be around two-thirds the weight of an MRAP, possible to be carried under a CH-47 Chinook and CH-53E Super Stallion and by amphibious vessels, things impossible for an MRAP. It would also be 70 percent faster off-road, adding to survivability by enabling it to egress a combat situation faster. Compared to the Humvee, the JLTV was to have the mobility of early unarmored versions with greater protection than up-armored versions, along with greater reliability, payload capacity, and ease of repair. The JLTV is the first vehicle purpose-built for network connectivity into the Warfighter Information Network-Tactical.

=== JLTV competition ===
The Joint Chief of Staff's Joint Requirements Oversight Council approved the JLTV program in November 2006; this began a 13-month Concept Refinement phase which is a pre-systems acquisition process designed to further develop the initial concepts resident in the Initial Capabilities Document. The Concept Refinement phase also includes an Analysis of Alternatives. At the conclusion of the Concept Refinement phase in December 2007, the Joint Program Office JLTV project manager intended to transition the program directly into the engineering, manufacturing, and development phase.

As the milestone approached, it became clear that the Under Secretary of Defense for Acquisition and Sustainment would not support the JLTV program entering into the acquisition process at that time. He denied the request and instructed the Army and the Marine Corps to develop a more vigorous Technology Development (TD) phase.

The DoD released a request for proposal (RfP) for the TD phase of the JLTV program in February 2008. In October 2008, the Pentagon narrowed the field of vendors to respondents Lockheed Martin, General Tactical Vehicles and BAE Systems/Navistar. Each team was awarded contracts worth between $35.9 million and $45 million to begin the next phase of the program.

These teams were as follows:

- General Dynamics and AM General (as "General Tactical Vehicles")
- BAE Systems Land and Armaments and Navistar
- Lockheed Martin, BAE Systems Land & Armaments Global Tactical Systems, Alcoa Defense and JWF Industries

Entries during the engineering and manufacturing development phase were not limited to the winners of the TD phase. At least six teams submitted bids. In August 2012, the Army and Marine Corps selected the Oshkosh Defense L-ATV, Lockheed Martin JLTV, and AM General BRV-O, as the winners of the EMD phase. They were awarded a contract to build 22 prototype vehicles.

Each company delivered 22 vehicles and six trailers to Aberdeen Proving Ground, Maryland, and Yuma Proving Ground, Arizona. Previous testing had already put the vehicles through more than 400 ballistic and blast tests on armor testing samples, underbody blast testing, and more than 1,000 miles in shakedown testing. Soldiers from the Army Test and Evaluation Command and personnel from the Defense Department's Office of Test and Evaluation would begin to put the vehicles through field testing during 14 months of government performance testing. Testing was scheduled for completion by FY2015, with a production contract to be awarded to a single vendor for almost 55,000 vehicles (49,099 Army; 5,500 Marines). In September 2013, full-pace, full-scope JLTV testing began at Aberdeen Proving Ground, Yuma, and Redstone Arsenal, Alabama.

=== Oshkosh L-ATV development ===
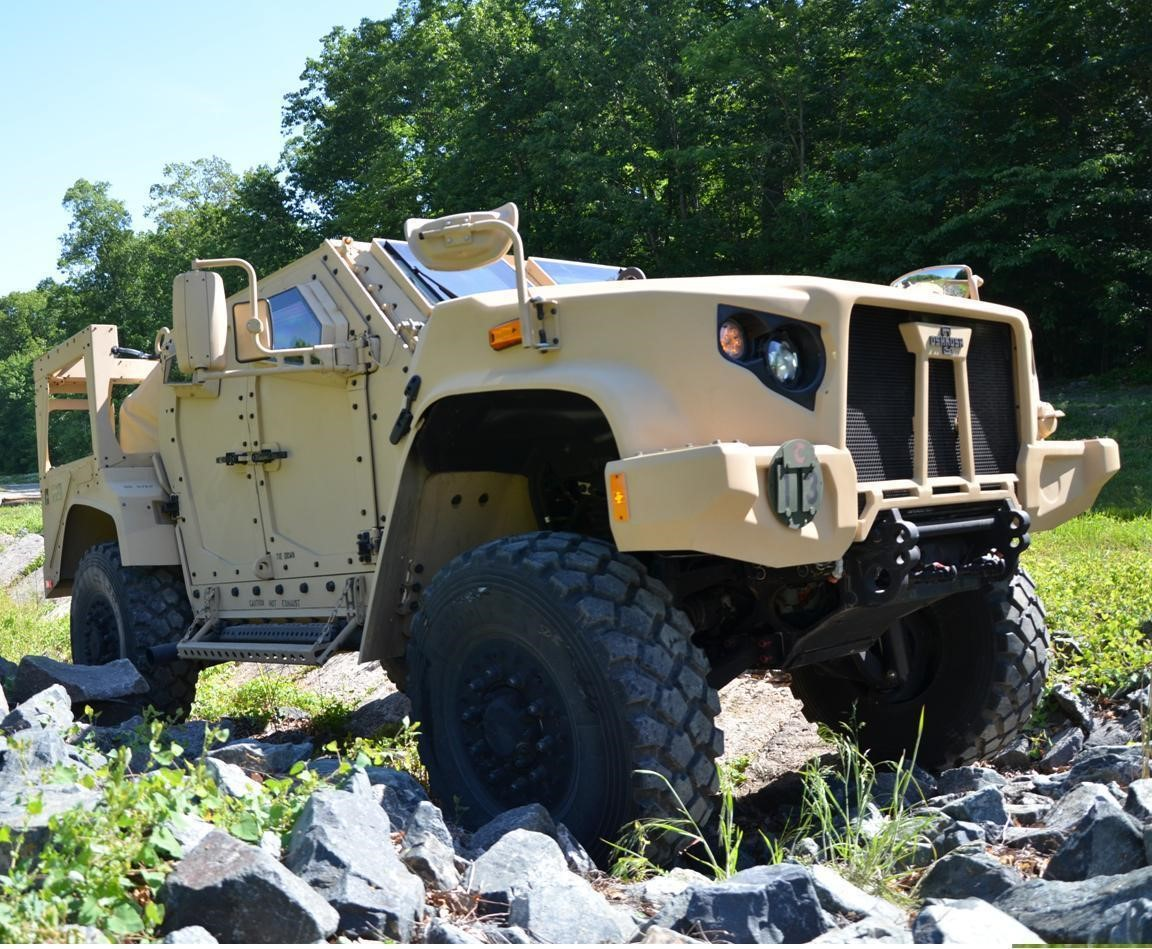
Oshkosh entry undergoing testing as part of the JLTV assessment at Fort Stewart, Georgia, in October 2014

Oshkosh Defense first displayed the L-ATV at Association of the United States Army (AUSA) in Washington, D.C. in October 2011. The L-ATV had developmental origins that trace back to 2007 and Oshkosh/Northrop Grumman's failed JLTV proposal, with some sub-systems having a lineage that trace back to 2005. At the time, L-ATV was the lightest tactical vehicle designed by Oshkosh, being some 50% lighter than anything previously produced by the company.

Oshkosh and Northrop Grumman submitted an unsuccessful bid for the JLTV technology development phase in 2008. Limited details were disclosed about the bid other than that the armor was developed by Plasan and the engine was diesel electric.

At AUSA 2011, Oshkosh suggested that following then recent program developments, L-ATV would be offered to meet the recently revitalized JLTV's EMD (Engineering & Manufacturing Development) phase.

In February 2013, Oshkosh unveiled the Utility Variant of its JLTV offer, fulfilling JLTV's requirement for a two-seat cargo vehicle. The vehicle's performance was demonstrated at the 2013 NATC Technology Rodeo at the Nevada Automotive Test Center (NATC). The Utility Variant is designed to provide mobility for loads such as containers, pallets, and break bulk cargo. It can also be outfitted as a shelter carrier to carry standard shelters for communications systems, on-board electronics, and other functions. Payload capacity is in excess of 2,300 kg (5,100 lb). Both Oshkosh L-ATV variants have a common crew protection system, automotive systems, and the Oshkosh TAK-4i intelligent independent suspension system.

In June 2013, L-ATV prototypes participated in an event hosted by the U.S. JLTV Joint Program Office in Quantico, Virginia. The vehicles successfully completed the severe off-road track (SORT) without failure. The SORT demonstrated the L-ATV's ability to maneuver steep inclines, turn sharply, and operate in rugged terrain.

In August 2013, Oshkosh delivered its first L-ATV JLTV prototype to the Army for government testing. The four-door variant (which has two base platforms – Close Combat Weapons Carrier (CCWC) and the General Purpose (GP)) and two-door Utility Variant were provided for evaluations.

In July 2014, Oshkosh announced the L-ATV had completed 200,000 miles (320,000 km) and all requirements for reliability, availability, maintainability (RAM) testing. In November 2014, Oshkosh announced the L-ATV had completed limited user testing (LUT) with the U.S. Army and Marine Corps for the JLTV EMD contract. The LUT focused on JLTV system capabilities, functions, operations, and interfaces in a range of simulated tactical environments covering operator and crew-level preventive maintenance for the entire system, ensuring they could operate proficiently and safely. The Army held theirs the previous September and October, where three tests were held as 96-hour cycles to simulate operational missions, one of which incorporated a live fire demonstration. The Marines completed two test cycles in October and November with one live fire demonstration. The Army released the final JLTV RfP in December 2014. On 10 February 2015 Oshkosh Defense issued a press release announcing the company had submitted its proposal (the L-ATV) in response to the JLTV Low Rate Initial Production (LRIP) and full-rate production (FRP) RfP.

=== Selection, production and fielding ===
In August 2015, the Army selected the Oshkosh L-ATV as the winner of the JLTV competition. The company was awarded a $6.75 billion low-rate initial base contract with two years of low-rate Initial Production (LRIP), originally three, and eight option years to procure the first 16,901 vehicles for both the Army and Marines. The Army initially declined to detail why the L-ATV was chosen over its competitors, likely owing to anticipations of protests from the losing bidders.

Lockheed Martin protested the award in the Court of Federal Claims, but withdrew it February 2016. potentially as a result of the release of JLTV testing data showing that the L-ATV lasted nearly six times longer between significant breakdown than Lockheed's vehicle.

The first delivery order for JLTV was announced in March 2016 with the U.S. Army ordering 657 JLTVs, along with kits and support. The $243 million order included vehicles for the Army and Marines. As part of the original JLTV base award in August 2015, an initial 201 JLTVs for the test and evaluation phase were ordered. The 657-vehicle order is an exercised option from the program's eight option years. Initial USMC operating capability was stated to be delayed by about one year to the first quarter of FY2020, with procurement by the Marines complete by FY2022.

In March 2016, the Pentagon announced that the total program costs had dropped 19.32%, from $30.574 billion to $24.668 billion "due primarily to revised estimates for unit costs of vehicles and kits based on realized savings", which accounted for a $3.7 billion decrease. A stretched out procurement "due to budget adjustments and revised assumptions regarding the maximum buy profile year" decreased costs by $1.28 billion, and several other changes – such as for cost estimation methodologies and indices – accounted for another $921 million decrease. The total cost estimates include "research and development, procurement, military construction, and acquisition-related operations and maintenance" associated with a program, the Pentagon said. These reflect actual costs so far and anticipated costs in the future, with all estimates in fully inflated then-year dollars. The Army expected the JLTV program to cut about five years off of the total program and save about US$5.9 billion, as Oshkosh's final competitive bid was low enough so the Army decided to "buy to budget" and get more platforms each year, which shrunk the total length of the contract and increased cost avoidances accrued each year.

The Pentagon FY2017 requested budget included US$587.5 million to procure 1,828 JLTVs for the Army and US$113.2 million to procure 192 for the Marines. About US$34.7 million was requested for research and development between the Army and Marines' JLTV programs. Procurement objectives at this time remained 49,099 JLTV for the Army and 5,500 for the Marines.

In January 2017, the U.S. Air Force announced it was considering acquiring JLTVs for its security forces that protect missile launch facilities. The vehicles are used by security forces, explosive ordnance disposal teams, para-rescue and personnel recovery units, tactical air control party teams, and special tactics forces. In its 2018 budget the Pentagon requested $1.143 billion for the program. The DoD requested 2,110 JLTVs for the Army, 140 for the Air Force, and 527 for the Marines.

In June 2017 the Marines revealed they wished to adjust their acquisition objective for JLTV by 65% to up to 9,091 vehicles.

In early 2018 the Marines 2018 planning objective for JLTV was disclosed to be 9,091, although funding (as of April 2018) allowed for only 7,622 JLTVs through FY2023, with deliveries concluding the first quarter of FY 2025. The Marine Corps declared initial operational capability for the JLTV in August 2019.

JLTV totals have varied over time and numerous suggestions as to ultimate totals and production increases/decreases have been touted, but as of January 2022 JLTV requirements were: Army – 49,099 (this figure has remained relatively constant); Marine Corps – 12,500 (approx.); Air Force – 2000 (dependent on funding); Navy (approx. 400).

In terms of contracts and orders, the initial JLTV contract award in summation had a potential value of US$6.749 billion and called for a maximum of 16,901 JLTVs. The second and follow-on sole source to Oshkosh contract allows for 6,262 JLTVs to be ordered by November 2023. In September 2020 a Justification and Approval (J&A) for up to an additional 6,262 JLTVs was granted, the original notice published in June 2020. The up to 6,262 JLTVs approved will technically be delivered under a separate second JLTV contract, but the original contract costings and timelines remain. Final orders are to be placed in November 2023, with deliveries permitted until late 2025, but expected to conclude mid-2025. The JLTV A2 re-compete award will allow for an additional 15,586 JLTV.

JLTV deliveries to the Army commenced in January 2019. That month the 1st Armored Brigade Combat Team, 3rd Infantry Division at Fort Stewart, Georgia, and Marine Corps 3rd Battalion, 8th Marines, 2nd Marine Division at Camp Lejeune, North Carolina, became the first respective units equipped. In June 2019, the Army approved the JLTV program's transition into full-rate production (FRP).

The Marine Corps declared initial operational capability for the JLTV in August 2019, ahead of the scheduled June 2020 date. The Marines had previously announced in January 2019 that its first JLTV had fielded that day at the School of Infantry West at Camp Pendleton, California, with around 1,000 further JLTVs scheduled to be fielded during FY2020.

For FY2020 the Pentagon's JLTV funding request totaled US$1.641 billion to procure 2,530 vehicles for the Army, 1,398 for the Marine Corps (with 3,986 more between FY2021 and FY2024), 140 for the Air Force, and 22 for the Navy. As of May 2019, the Army had not changed its approved acquisition objective of 49,099 JLTVs.

In July 2020, Oshkosh stated that over 7,500 JLTVs had been delivered to the U.S. Army, U.S. Marine Corps, U.S. Air Force, and U.S. Navy since the production contract was awarded in 2015. This order brought the total of JLTVs ordered for US forces to date to 15,052.

In February 2021, Oshkosh announced the company had produced its 10,000th JLTV and had received orders for 18,126 JLTVs in contracts totaling more than $6 billion. The first National Guard fielding of JLTV was the 19th SF in 3QFY21.

As of April 2022, 15 JLTV delivery orders had been placed:

- August 2015: 201 as part of the original JLTV base award and for the test and evaluation phase
- March 2016: 657; value $243 million
- September 2016: 130; value $42 million
- January 2017: 409; value $179 million
- August 2017: 748; value $195 million
- September 2017: 611; value $177 million
- December 2017: 258; value $100.1 million
- February 2018: 416; value $106 million
- June 2018: 1,574; value $484 million
- November 2018: 6,107; value $1.69 billion
- December 2019: 2,721; value $803.9 million
- February 2020: 1,240; value $407.3 million (includes unspecified quantities for Slovenia and Lithuania as FMS)
- July 2020: 248; value $127 million
- November 2020: 2,679; value $884.4 million (brought the total of JLTVs ordered for U.S. forces to date to 17,731, and was technically the first order under the second contract. Also included were 59 JLTVs valued at USD23 for Brazil, Lithuania, and Macedonia, making the overall total 2,738 JLTVs)
- November 2021: 1,544; value including FMS is $591 million

(all orders include unspecified quantities of training, support, kits and/or trailers)

U.S. Army and Marines orders are for around 19,150 JLTVs as of 2022.

=== A2 rebuy program ===
In July 2019 an initial Sources Sought notice was issued for the A2 JLTV recompete program. Four draft request for proposals (RFPs) followed, these on 3 April 2020, 11 December 2020, 30 April 2021, and 29 October 2021.

In January 2022, a presolicitation notice was issued for the Joint Light Tactical Vehicle (JLTV) Family of Vehicles (FoV) Follow-On, the A2 contract. The planned period of performance for this contract is from September 2022 through September 2032. The awarded contract will be a single award, five-year requirements type contract, with five one-year options on a Cost-Plus Fixed-Fee and Firm-Fixed Price basis. The projected contract value is $7.3 billion with original contract award pricing retained (plus inflation), and the award is expected to call for a maximum of 15,425 A2 JLTV and 6,000 JLTV Trailers, with deliveries to commence 18 months after the contract award. In addition to Oshkosh, respondents to the RfP were expected to include AM General, GM Defense, and Navistar. Oshkosh maintains the rights to produce JLTVs for direct commercial sale.

In February 2023, the Army selected the AM General bid. Oshkosh submitted a protest of the award, which GAO denied. Oshkosh expects to produce JLTVs into early 2025.

=== U.S. Army cancellation ===
On 30 April 2025, US Secretary of Defense Pete Hegseth ordered the Secretary of the Army to "end procurement of obsolete systems, and cancel or scale back ineffective or redundant programs, including manned aircraft, excess ground vehicles (e.g., HMMWV), and outdated UAVs". The Army said it would stop procuring Humvees and JLTVs. AM General said it would continue producing the vehicles, and it was unclear whether existing contracts would be cancelled.

== Design ==
=== Mobility ===
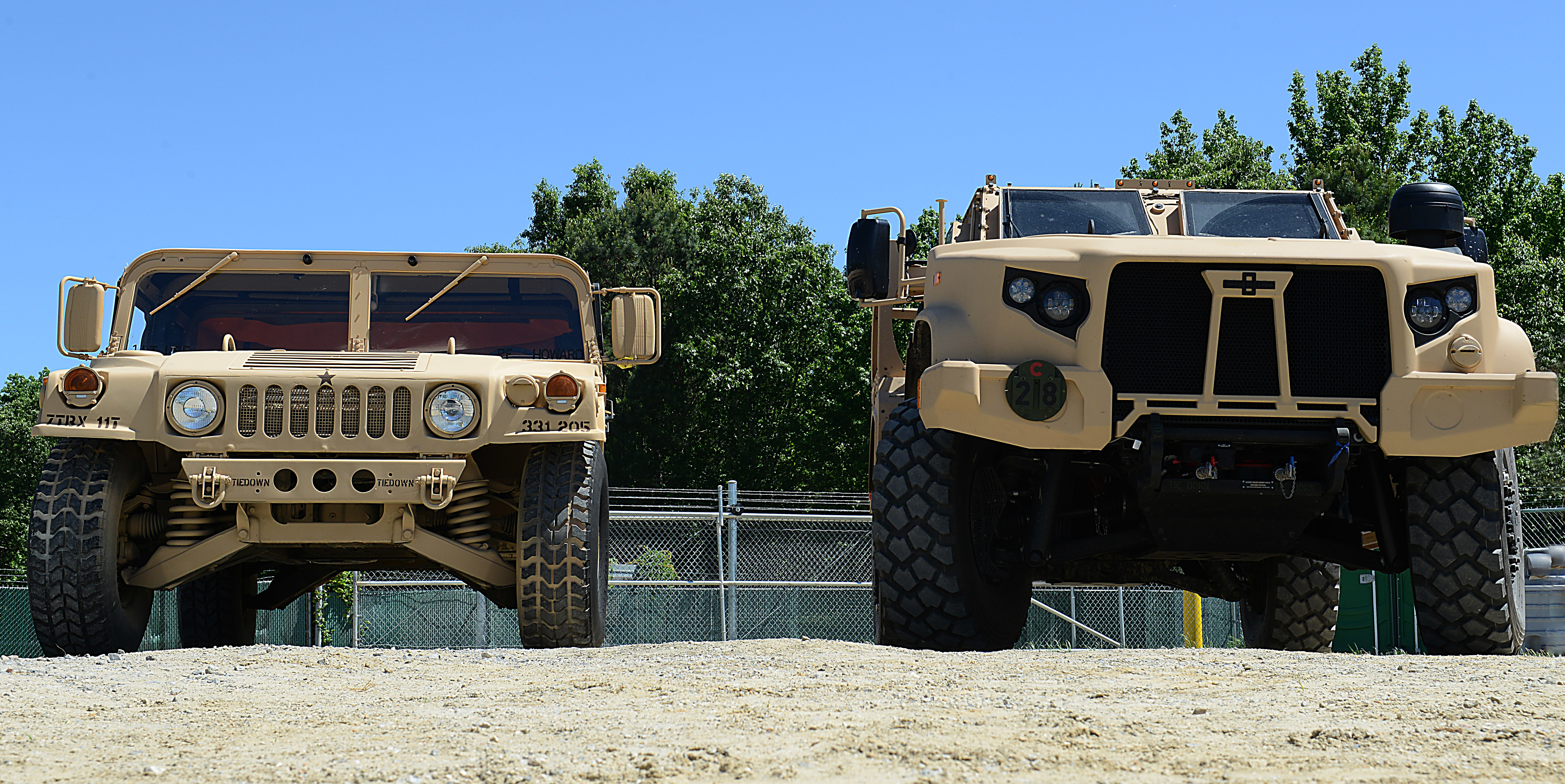
A Humvee and a Joint Light Tactical Vehicle on display at Joint Base Langley-Eustis, Virginia

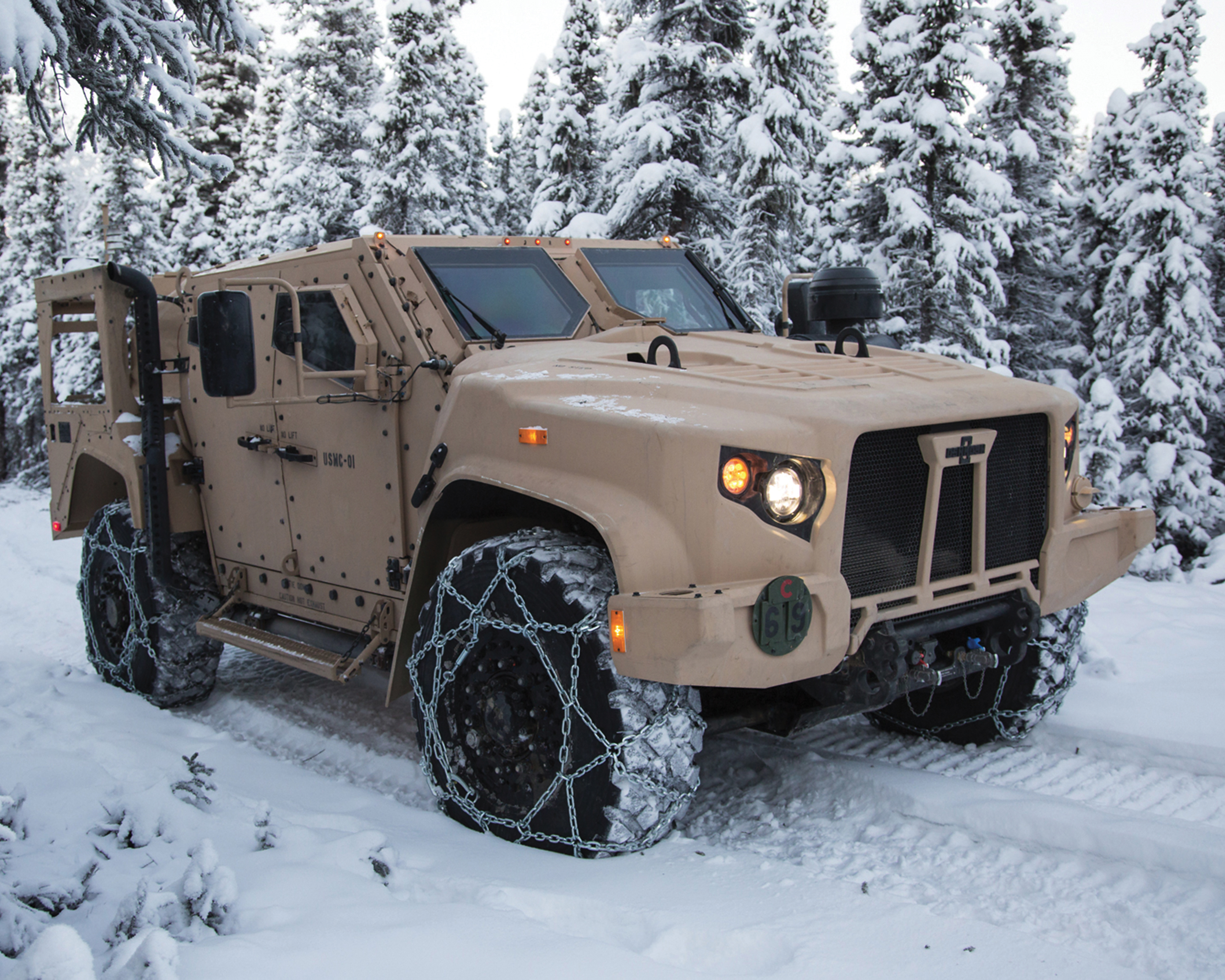
A production standard USMC JLTV in M1280 General Purpose (GP) configuration, this example fitted with a deep fording kit and tire chains.

The L-ATV is based around Oshkosh's TAK-4i (i = intelligent) independent suspension system. Vehicles fitted with an earlier version of the system, include the Oshkosh Medium Tactical Vehicle Replacement (MTVR), Oshkosh Logistic Vehicle System Replacement, and Oshkosh MRAP All-Terrain Vehicle (M-ATV); the TAK-4 system has also been retro-fitted to the Force Protection Inc Cougar and BAE Systems RG-33 MRAPs. The majority of systems supplied pre-JLTV have been coil-sprung. The TAK-4i version fitted to the L-ATV remains undisclosed, but is not coil-sprung and is of the variable adjustable ride-height type with up to 20 inches (51 cm) of wheel travel, 25 percent more than the current standard.

Motive power is provided by a digitally-controlled Gale Banks Engineering 866T V8 turbodiesel, based on the architecture of the General Motors Duramax L5P. Power output is 400 hp (298 kW; 406 PS) and 850 lb⋅ft (1,152 N⋅m) of torque. In commercial use, power output of the standard Duramax L5P engine is currently up to 445 hp (332 kW; 451 PS) and 910 lb⋅ft (1,234 N⋅m). An Allison 2500SP six-speed fully automatic transmission is fitted to all JLTV. The L-ATV can be fitted with the Oshkosh ProPulse diesel-electric powertrain, previously fitted to the Oshkosh Heavy Expanded Mobility Tactical Truck (HEMTT) and MTVR. According to Oshkosh literature, the ProPulse diesel-electric powertrain dramatically improves fuel economy by up to 35 percent in certain circumstances and serves as an on-board generator with enough output to power an entire airfield or hospital, generating up to 120 kW of AC power for external operations; the hybrid powertrain was not a requirement of the JLTV program. A hybrid electric JLTV was unveiled in January 2022. This variant is fitted with a lithium-ion battery pack.

In a limited user test (LUT) c. 2016, the L-ATV demonstrated reliability of 7,051 "Mean Miles Between Operational Mission Failure", more than the Humvee and either other JLTV competitor.

=== Armor ===
The L-ATV offers protection levels greater than those of up-armored HMMWVs and comparable to those of original MRAP class designs, but in an overall vehicle package that is considerably smaller and lighter than vehicles procured under MRAP procurement. The JLTV armor is modular with an A-kit and a B-kit. The A-kit, which is installed during production, is primarily fixings for add-on armor but can include small amounts of armor fitted in difficult-to-reach areas. The B-kit is essentially the add-on armor, this added when required and as a modular add-on. According to the US Army, the A-kit/B-kit concept allows the Army flexibility in several areas: the armor B-kit can be taken off when not needed – reducing unnecessary wear and tear on the vehicles. Oshkosh developed the CORE 1080 crew protection system for the vehicle, comprising the hull design, armor materials, a fire-extinguishing system, and energy-absorbing floors, seats, and restraint systems for crew members and stowage.

The Oshkosh M-ATV, which was procured primarily for Afghanistan where the earlier and bigger/heavier MRAPs had mobility issues, has protection comparable to the original MRAP designs, but while smaller it still remains a relatively large vehicle. During the L-ATV design process, every component was optimized for survivability, resulting in the same level of protection in a vehicle 30 percent smaller. This resulted in a curb weight for the JLTV requirement of 14,000 lb (6,400 kg), almost one-third the weight of the heavier MRAP (4x4) models, and almost half the weight of the original MRAP models. Payload allowance for the JLTV in Combat Tactical Vehicle (CTV) configuration was four passengers and 3,500 lb (1,600 kg) of cargo, and in Combat Support Vehicle (CSV) configuration was two passengers and 5,100 lb (2,300 kg) of cargo.

=== Armament ===
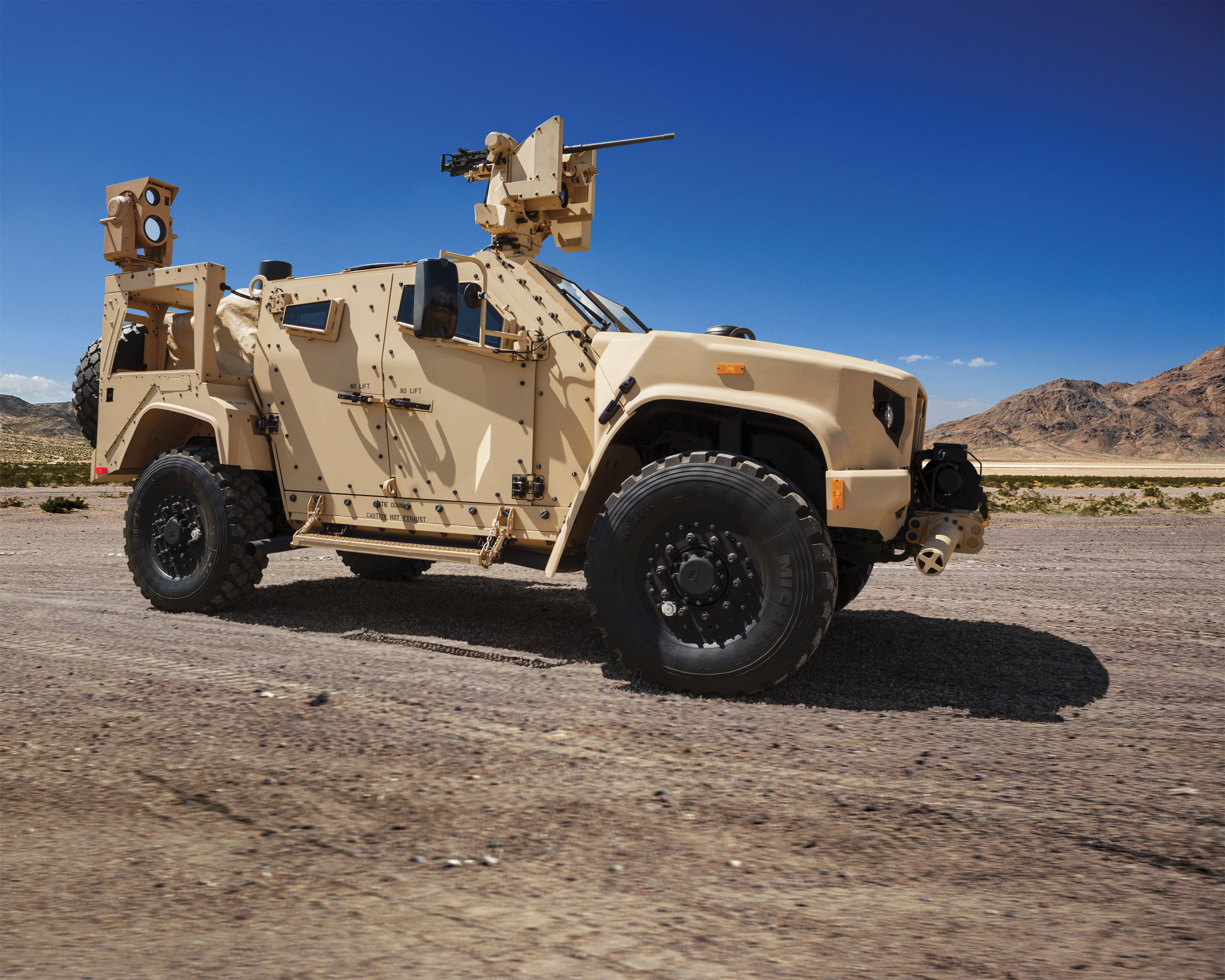
JLTV General Purpose variant fitted with a Boeing CLWS and a heavy machine gun-armed RWS

The base L-ATV does not have a standard armament, however it can be fitted with a selection of weapons including light, medium, and heavy machine guns, automatic grenade launchers, or anti-tank guided missiles (ATGMs) depending on user requirements. The weapons can be operated from ring mounts or a remote weapon station. Smoke grenade launchers for self-defence can also be fitted if required.

== Variants ==
=== Initial variants ===
The JLTV family and its nomenclature evolved throughout the development process and to date the U.S. Army has allocated M designations to four individual JLTV configurations. The JLTV family now consists of three base vehicle platforms, Utility (JLTV-UTL), Close Combat Weapons Carrier (JLTV-CCWC) and General Purpose (JLTV-GP). The Utility base vehicle platform is a two-door configuration, the General Purpose and Close Combat Weapons Carrier base vehicle platforms are a four-door configuration. Standard U.S. military M-designators are applied base vehicle platforms when outfitted to a specific Mission Package Configuration. These currently are:

- M1278 Heavy Guns Carrier – The JLTV-HGC carries a four-man crew when equipped with a Remote Weapon System (RWS) or a five-man crew when fitted with an open-top turret. It supports crew served weapons, like the M2 .50 caliber machine gun or Mk-19 grenade launcher, with the Gunner's Protection Kit (GPK) or RWS.
- M1279 Utility – The JLTV-UTL carries a two-man crew for cargo delivery and supports a payload of 5,100 lb (2,300 kg). It can be equipped with a Troop Seat Kit (TSK) to transport up to eight troops or fitted with a cargo shelter.
- M1280 General Purpose – The JLTV-GP is the base vehicle that carries a four-man crew and supports a payload of 3,500 lb (1,600 kg).
- M1281 Close Combat Weapons Carrier – The JLTV-CCWC can carry a crew of five and supports anti-tank/anti-armor heavy weapons, such as the M41A7 Saber missile system, which fires TOW missiles. The system design includes a securable rear cargo box capable of accommodating TOW/SABER weapon system components, missiles, and loading/reloading capabilities. For gunner protection, the open-top turret is equipped with the TOW Objective Gunner Protection Kit (TOGPK 2.0), which provides enhanced armor protection, improved situational awareness, and greater weapon maneuverability without adding excessive weight.
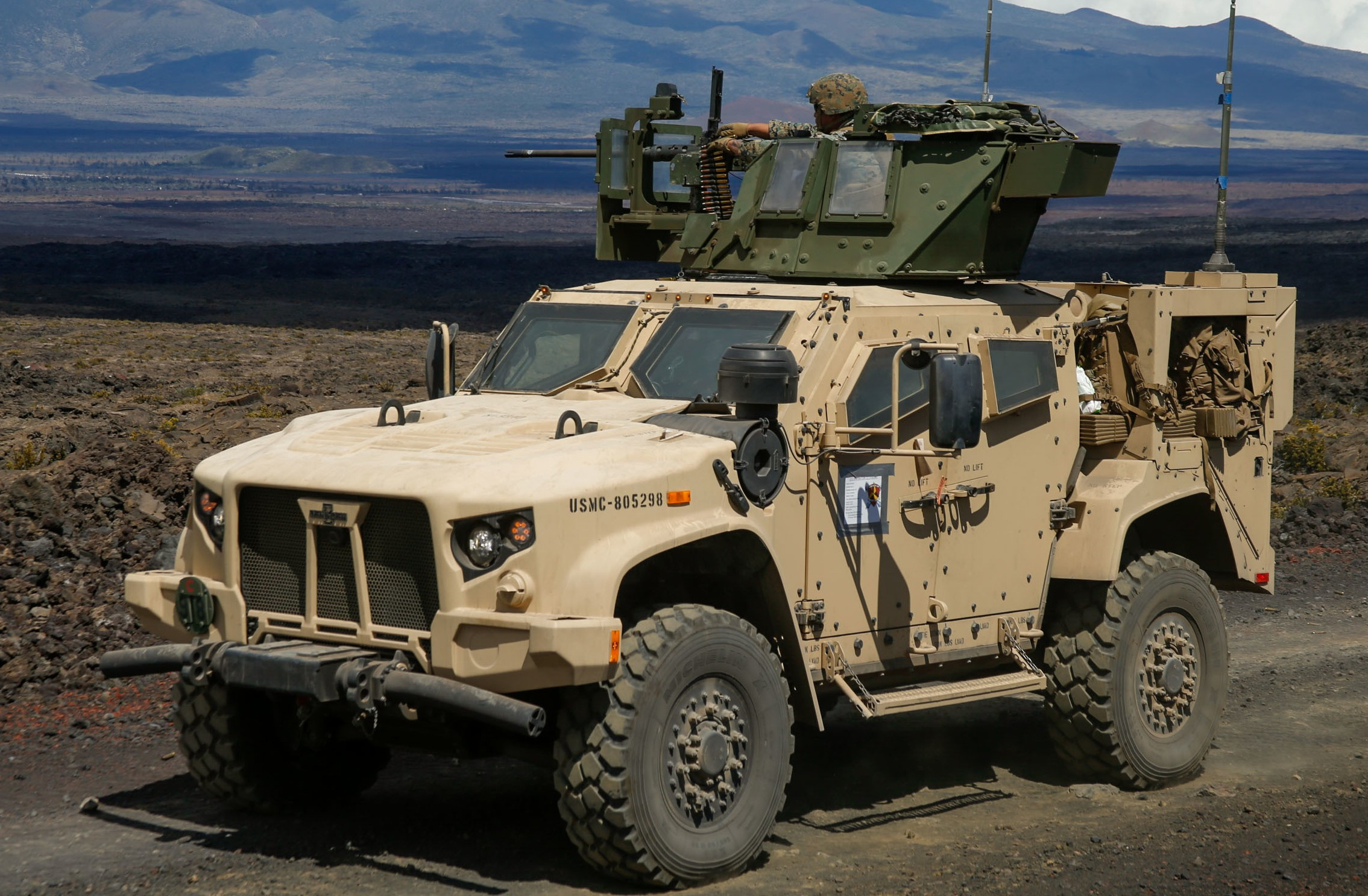
M1278 JLTV-HGC

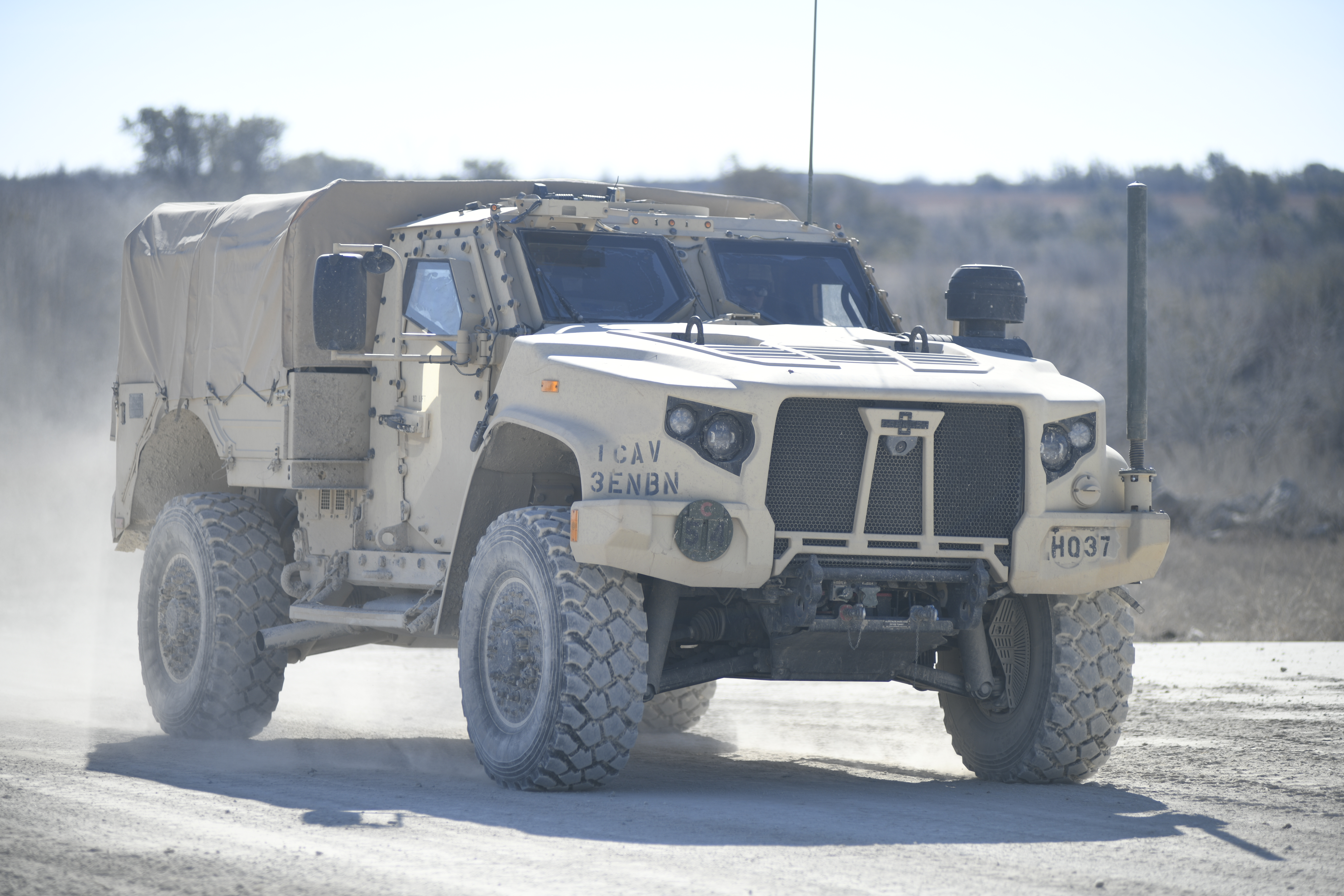
M1279 JLTV-UTL

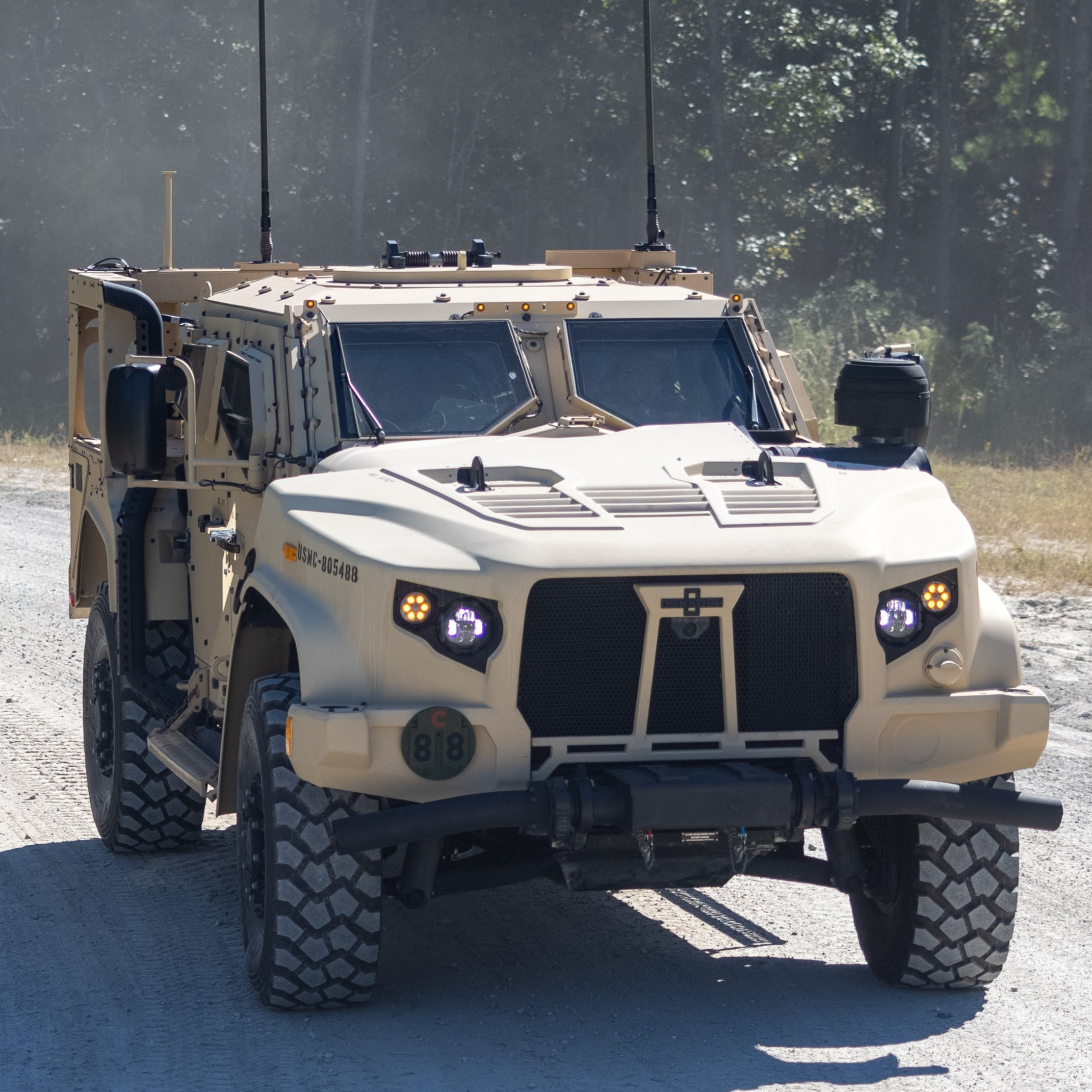
M1280 JLTV-GP

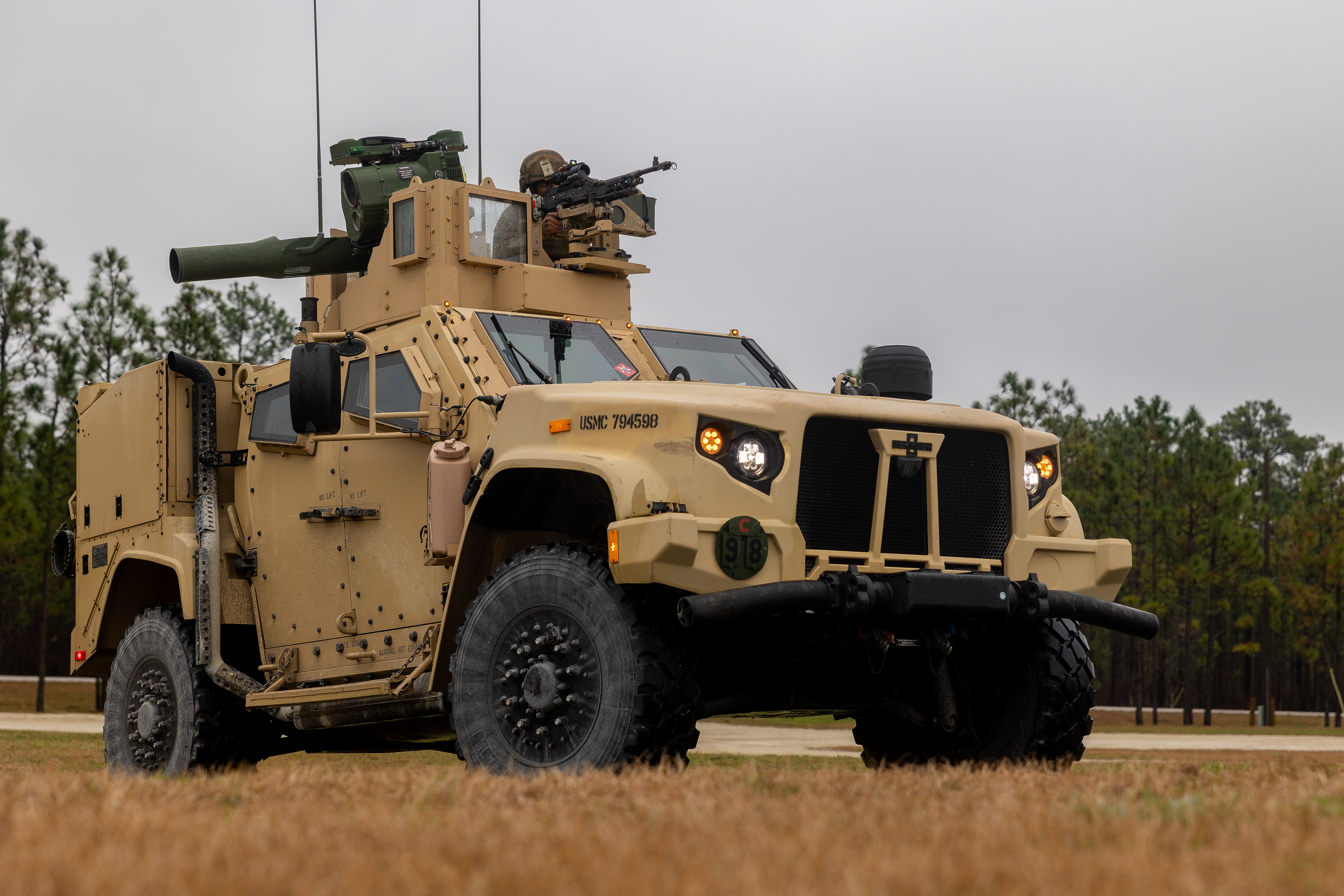
M1281 JLTV-CCWC with the TOGPK 2.0 turret

M1281 firing a TOW missile

=== JLTV A2 ===
AM General took over the program, and it features a new Duramax engine and 740 amp C.E. Niehoff & Co. alternator capable of charging Li-Ion batteries.

=== L-ATV Ambulance variant ===
Showcased at the Association of the United States Army (AUSA) Global Force Symposium in 2019. The L-ATV Ambulance is based on the Utility configuration base platform and the rear can hold 4 litters or up to 8 seated patients or a combination of the two.

=== Hybrid electric JLTV ===
In January 2022 Oshkosh unveiled a hybrid-electric Joint Light Tactical Vehicle (eJLTV) technology demonstrator that uses a ‘commercially available' lithium-ion battery. It takes the diesel engine of the JLTV about 30 minutes to charge the lithium-ion battery, and then the eJLTV can operate on battery power for approximately the same amount of time. It can export up to 115 kW of power. The hybrid electric configuration adds more than 453 kg to the vehicle's curb weight.

=== Light Reconnaissance Vehicle ===
In May 2016, the Army confirmed a plan, suggested since late 2015, to use the JLTV for the Light Reconnaissance Vehicle (LRV) requirement. By 2020 the LRV requirement had evolved to such an extent that it excluded the JLTV, requiring a six-person crew.

=== Trailers ===
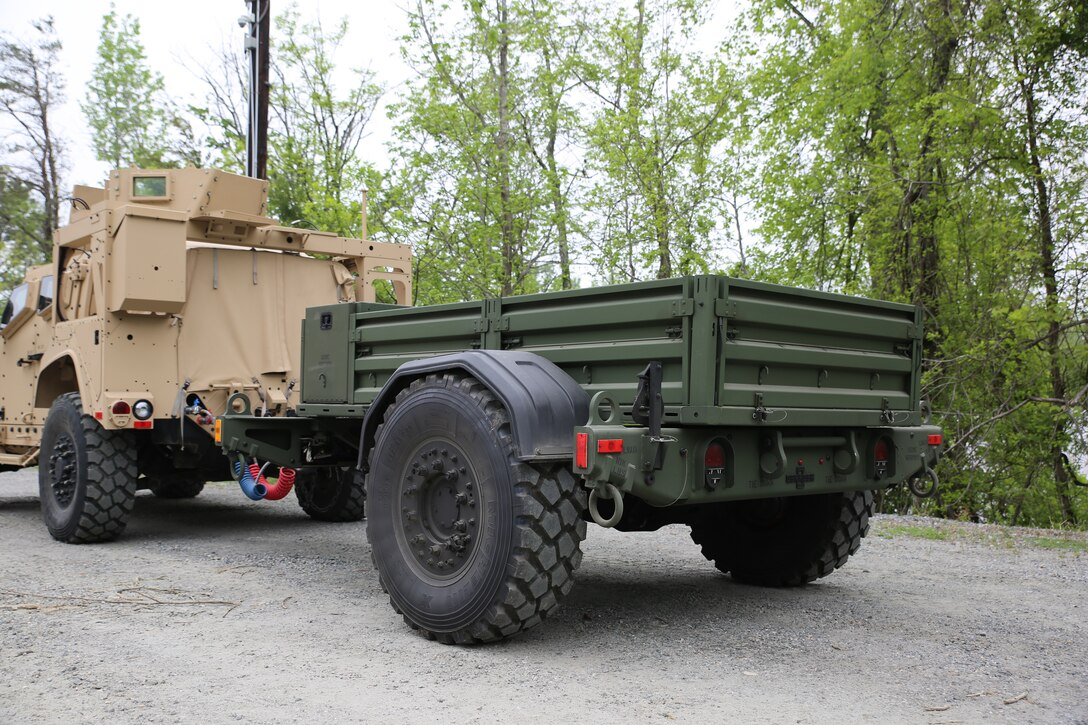
A JLTV-Trailer used by the U.S. Marine Corps

From June 2019 a dedicated trailer (JLTV-T) is being procured for the JLTV, as in-service trailers were unable to safely match the performance and mobility of the JLTV. A dedicated companion trailer for the JLTV (the JLTV – Trailer (JLTV-T) formed part of the requirement from its early stages, and the production contract awarded to Oshkosh included the option for trailer production. The decision was taken to leverage the investment made in the HMMWV's Light Tactical Trailer (LTT) and not to resource procurement of the JLTV-T.

As a result of this, initial quantities were limited to test examples only. Operational testing demonstrated that the LTT was not compatible with a JLTV operating at mission profile speeds, so the JLTV was limited to the safe towing speed of the LTT to limit equipment damage. In June 2020 Oshkosh announced that the company had been awarded a contract modification to increase available trailer options from 32 to 3,541. As part of a November 2020 JLTV award 1,001 trailers were ordered. First fielding of the JLTV-Trailer is scheduled for March 2022, and until then the JLTV is used with the LTT, but at a reduced mission profile.

The JLTV-T is based on a bolted channel section chassis and features independent trailing arm and air suspension. Wheels and tires are shared with the JLTV. The cargo deck features removable sidewalls and tailgate, an onboard stowage box included for these when the trailer is used as a flatbed. ISO locks are provided on the loadbed for any required shelter of similar interface.

=== MADIS ===
The Marine Air Defense Integrated System (MADIS) is a specialized variant of the Joint Light Tactical Vehicle (JLTV) designed for short-range air defense. It comprises two complementary variants: the MADIS Mk1, designated AN/MSY-2(v)1, and the MADIS Mk2, designated AN/MSY-2(v)2. The MADIS Mk1 is equipped with a Kongsberg Defense Protector RS6 remote weapon station armed with an XM914E1 30 mm chain gun, an M240 7.62 mm MG, and turret-mounted Stinger missiles. It also features Electro Optical Infra-Red (EO/IR) optics and multi-functional electronic warfare (EW) capabilities, allowing it to engage aerial threats. The MADIS Mk2 is similarly equipped with a Kongsberg Defense Protector RS6 remote weapon station with the same armament but lacks Stinger missiles. Instead, it is optimized for counter-unmanned aerial system (C-UAS) operations, featuring a 360-degree radar composed of four RADA aCHR (RPS-62) radars, multi-function EW systems, and a command-and-control suite for seamless battlefield coordination. Both variants include the Ascent Vision Technologies CM262 mast-mounted gimballed sight. Together, these variants provide a highly mobile, layered defense system capable of detecting, tracking, and neutralizing drones and other low-altitude threats, enhancing the Marine Corps’ air defense capabilities.

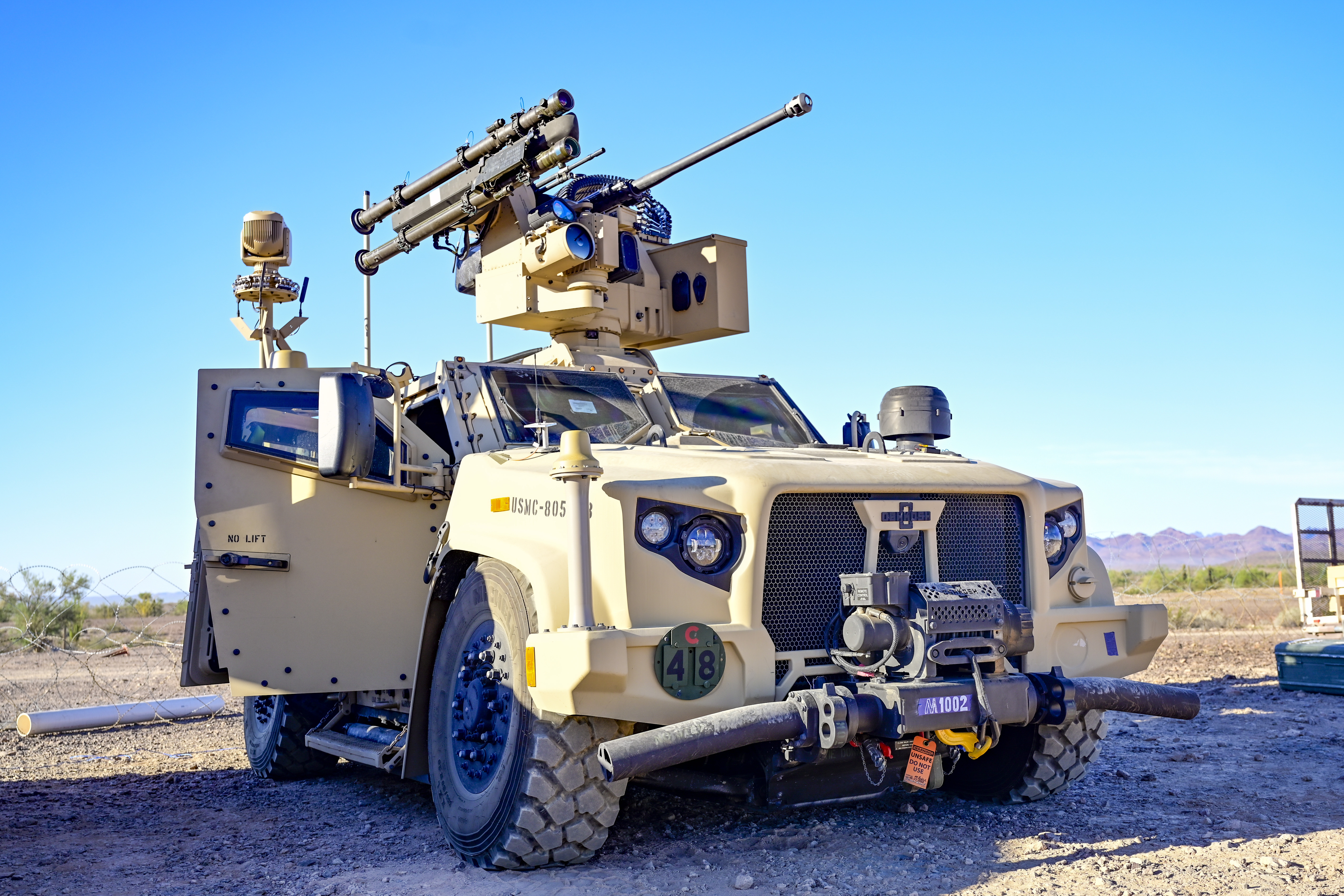
MADIS Mk1

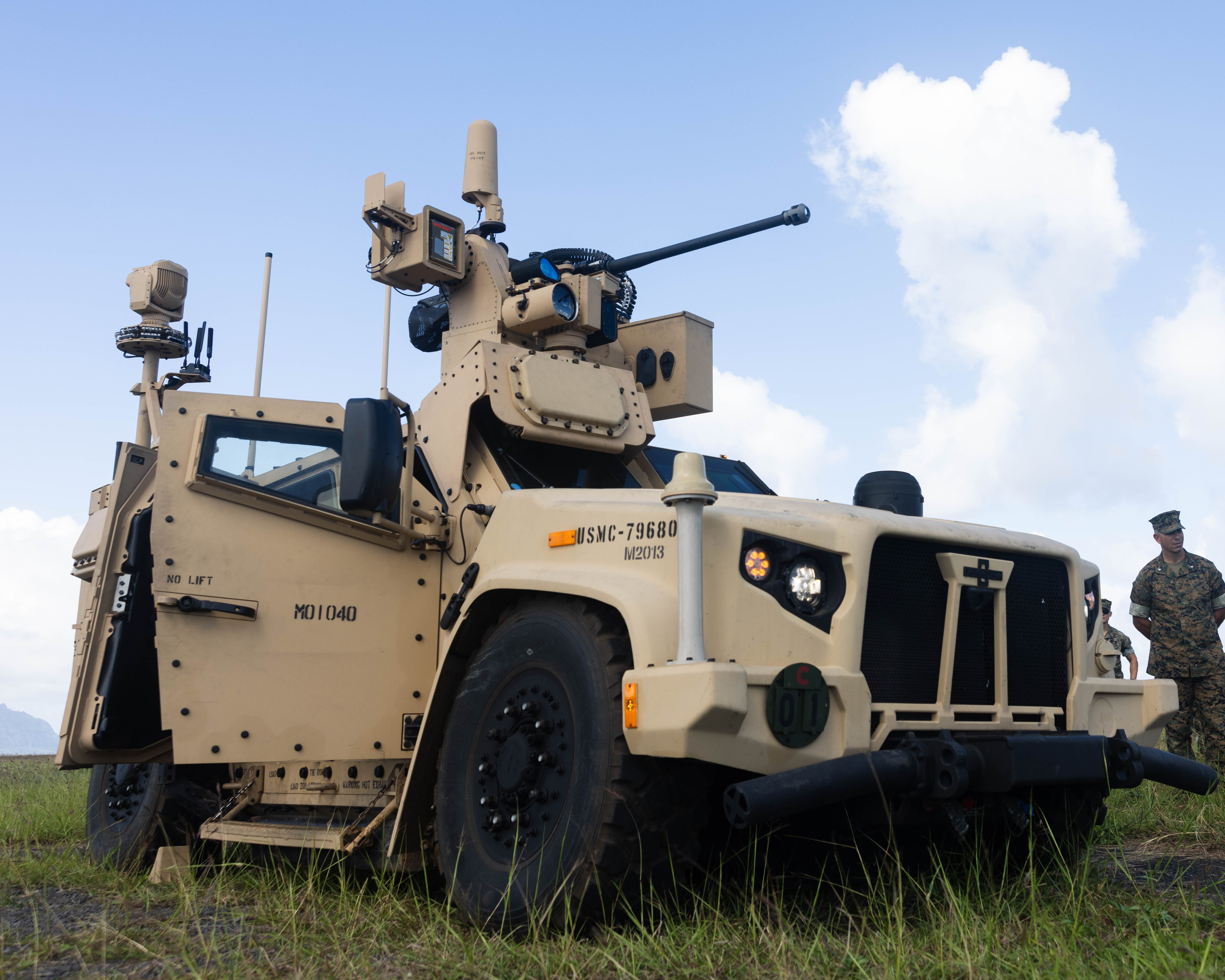
MADIS Mk2

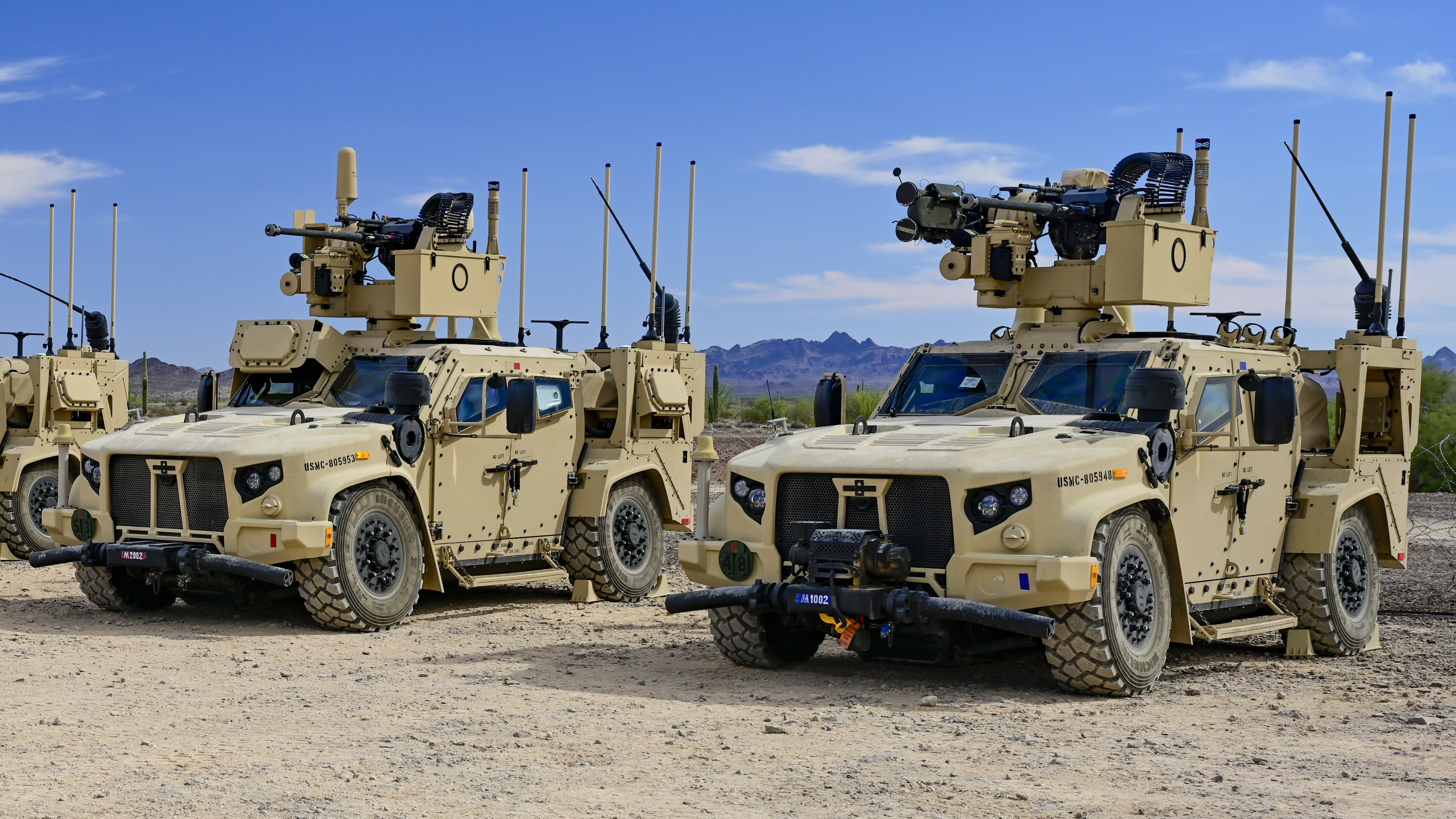
MADIS Mk2 (left) and Mk1 (right)

=== Other variants ===
At AUSA 2016, Oshkosh displayed a JLTV General Purpose variant equipped with an EOS R-400S-MK2 remote weapon system integrated with Orbital ATK's M230LF 30 mm lightweight automatic chain gun.

At AUSA 2017 JLTVs were displayed in three new configurations. Oshkosh displayed a General Purpose variant fitted with a Boeing Compact Laser Weapon System (CLWS), a Kongsberg Protector LW 30 Remote Weapon System (RWS) with a M230LF cannon, and a communications suite that includes a Thales VRC-111 and Thales VRC-121 VIPER. The company also displayed a Utility variant equipped with the Boeing Maneuver Short Range Air Defense (SHORAD) Launcher including a M3P .50 cal machine gun, M299 launcher with four Longbow Hellfire missiles, sensor suite, and a communications suite including a Thales VRC-111. Rafael displayed a General Purpose vehicle fitted with the company's Samson RWS Dual Stabilized Remote Weapon Systems (RWS) with M230 LF, and the Trophy Light Active Protection System (APS).

== Operators ==
=== Current operators ===
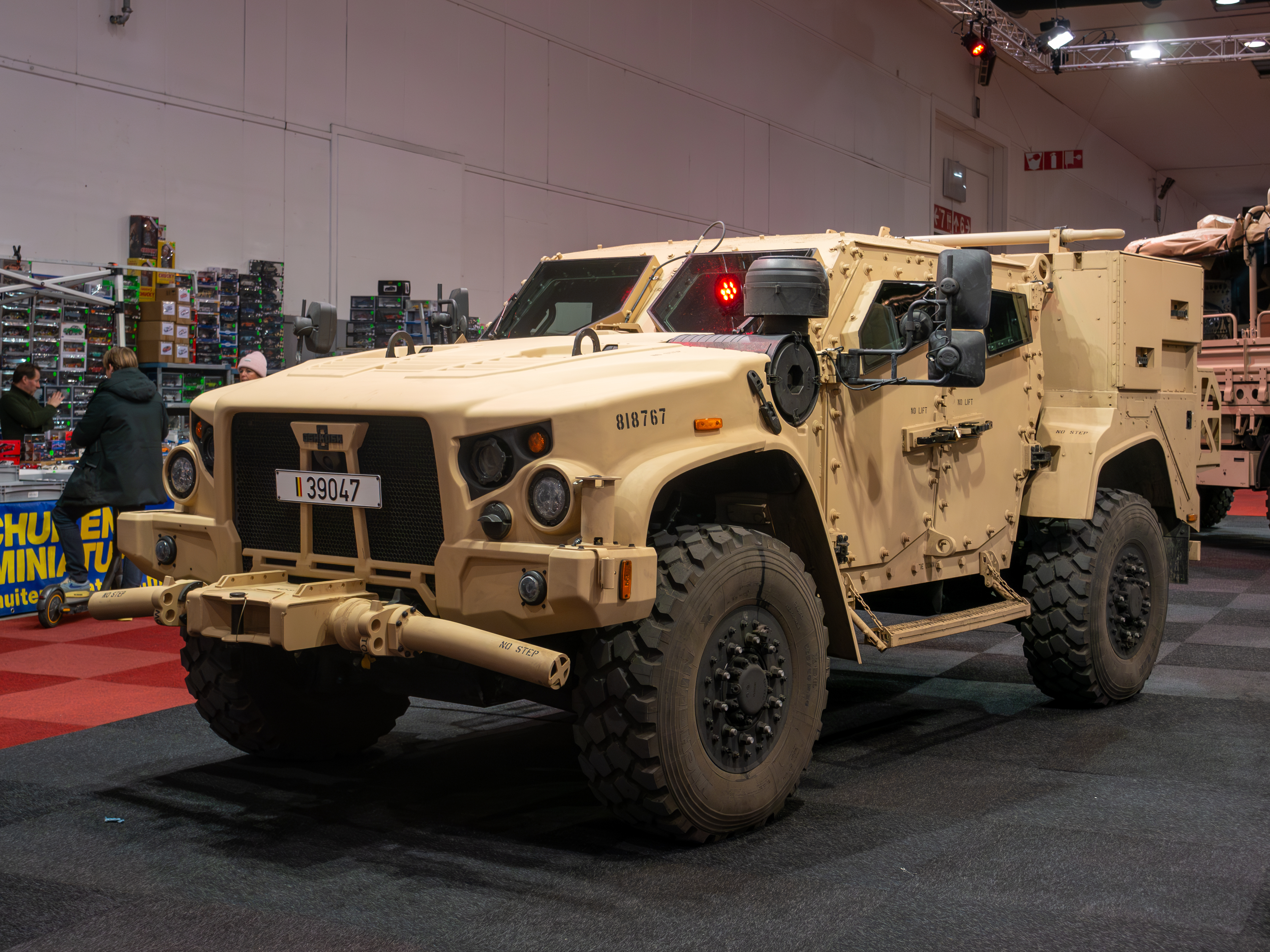
Oshkosh Falcon of the Belgian Army

Belgium (322)
The Belgian Land Component ordered 322 JLTV to replace the Iveco LMV fleet in September 2020 for €135 million. The JLTV was ordered in two variants, 302 "CLV" (Command and Liaison Vehicle) and 20 "Médicale" (medical / ambulance), 135 CLV are to be equipped with a light weapon stations deFNder® from FN Herstal. The first delivery occurred in January 2024.

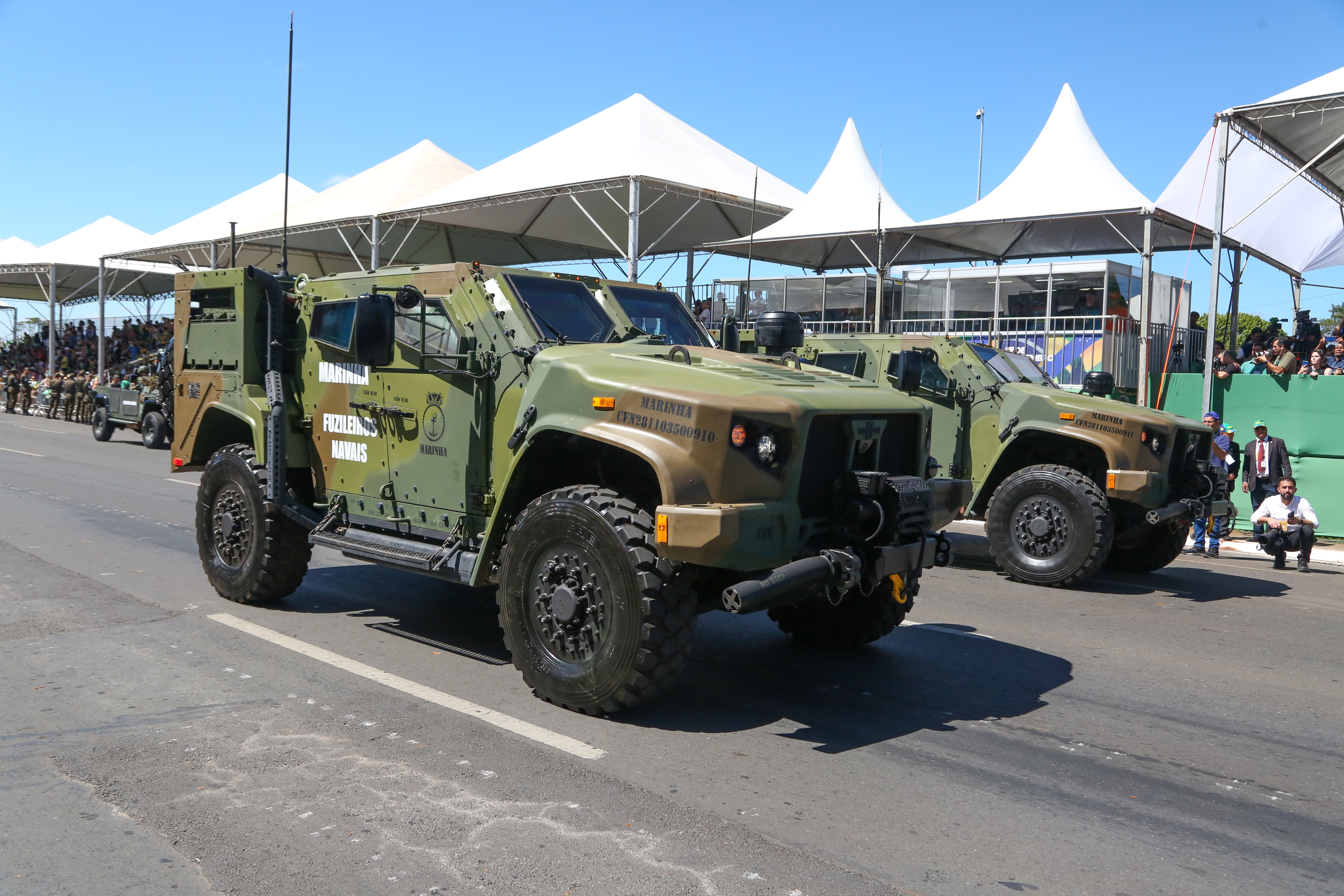
Brazilian JLTV

Brazil (12)
The Brazilian Marine Corps signed a contract for a batch of 12 JLTV in October 2020, to be delivered between 2022 and 2026.
The Brazilian JLTV are equipped with an Objective Gunner Protection Kit and have an Explosively Formed Penetrator (EFP) kit armor suite and a B-kit add-on armor system. Rumors surfaced in September 2021 regarding a potential purchase of 32 additional JLTVs to equip 1st, 2nd, and 3rd Marine Infantry Battalions and 12 for the Special Operations Battalion, but no additional order has yet taken place. The first delivery of four JLTV took place in March 2023.

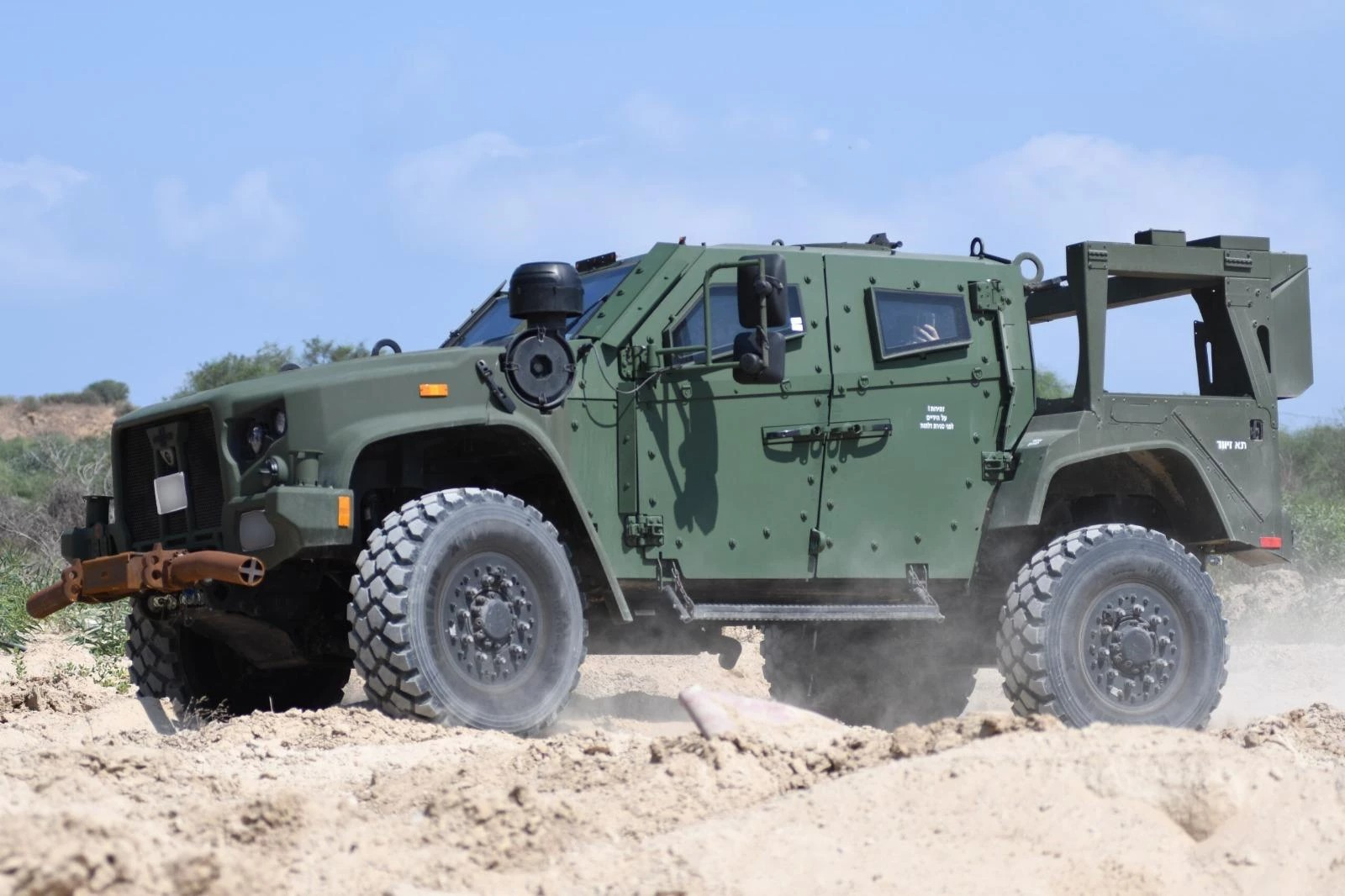
A JLTV of the Israel Defense Forces

Israel (≥ 99)
In December 2023, Oshkosh announced that the Israel Defense Forces ordered 75 JLTV through the Foreign Military Sale (FMS) mechanism, and dozens additional were purchased via Direct Commercial Sale (DCS). Some JLTV were observed in operation in Israel in November 2024.

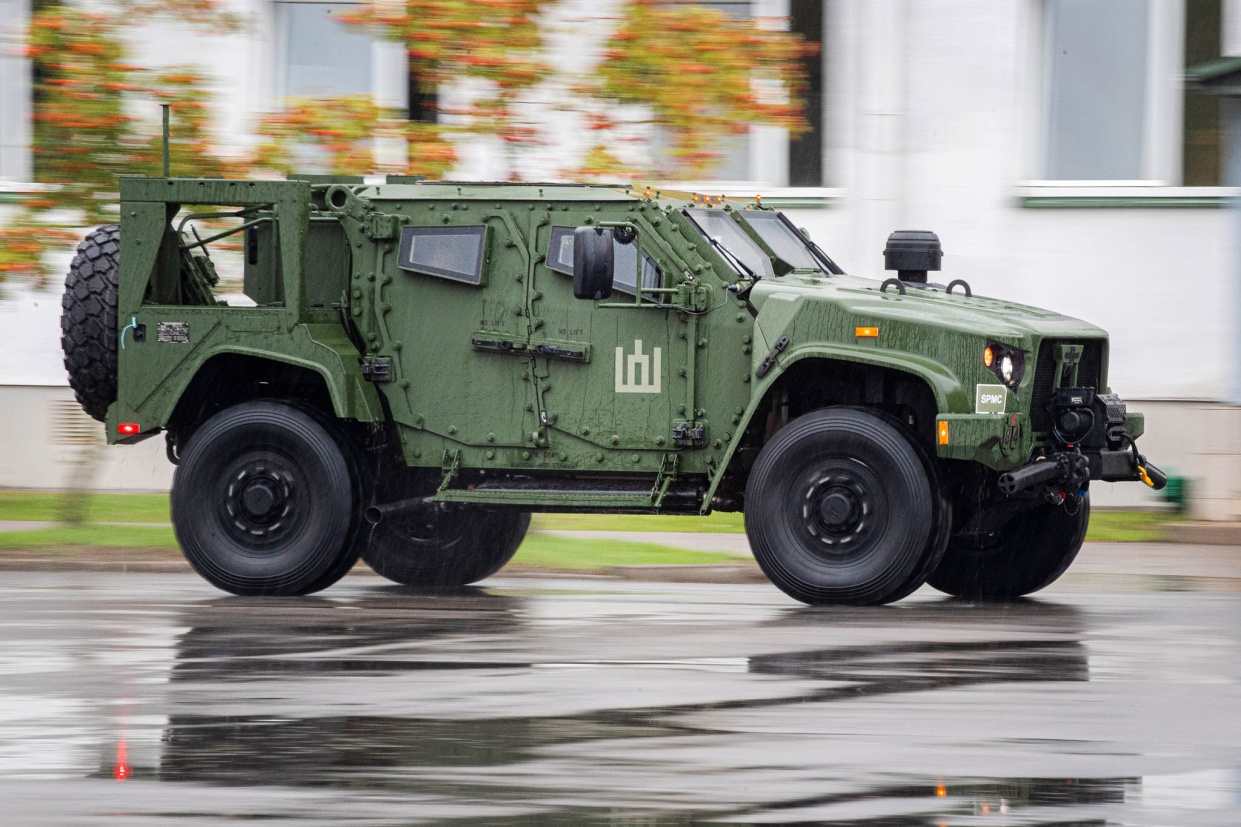
A JLTV of the Lithuanian Armed Forces in Rukla

Lithuania (500)
The Lithuanian Army signed a contract for a batch of 200 JLTV in November 2019. An additional contract for 300 JLTV was signed in October 2022 for a total of 500 vehicles ordered. The delivery of the first contract was split in 4 batches of 50 vehicles. The first delivery took place in August 2021, the second in December 2022, the third in May 2023, and the fourth in December 2023. The delivery of the second contracts is planned for 2024. The variant selected by Lithuania is the M1278A1 with the main equipment being the M153 CROWS v2 remote weapon station. This weapon station is equipped with the M2 QCB50 machine gun and a M230 TacFLIR multisensor systems. On 18 February 2026 The Ministry of National Defence has confirmed that all of ordered U.S.-made Joint Light Tactical Vehicles JLTV were delivered to Lithuania in mid-February. The Lithuanian Armed Forces now operates 500 advanced armored vehicles.
Montenegro (67)
The Armed Forces of Montenegro ordered 67 JLTV in October 2019 for US$36.17 million. This order was completed by an order in December 2019 to Elbit for the OCRWS (Overhead Remote Control Weapon Station) weapon station at a cost of US$35 million.
The variants selected by Montenegro are 55 "M1280 General Purpose" to be fitted with the Elbit weapon station equipped with a 12.7×99mm NATO heavy machine gun. For the other variants, Montenegro mentions having received 10 "M1278 Heavy Guns Carrier" as of 2024. In 2024, the army announced its interest to equip four of the M1278 variant with a SAMSON 30 (Katlanit) turret. Also, in May 2023, Montenegro signed a contract with Israel for €20 million regarding the supply of Elbit 120 mm Spear Mk2 low recoil mortar systems to be installed on the JLTV (quantity unknown). Those systems are designed to be installed on the M1279 Utility variant, and therefore, with 55 in the M1280 variant and 10 in the M1278 variant, only 2 are possible with the unique order.
North Macedonia (~97)
The Army of the Republic of North Macedonia signed a contract in 2020 for 33 JLTV to be delivered in 2022 and 2023. The country has plans for 99 JLTV and options to buy a total of up to 152 JLTV by 2024. In July 2022, the first 6 JLTVs were delivered to the Army, and the rest was delivered by year end of 2022.
Romania (129)
The Romanian government made a Foreign Military Sales request for 34 M1278 Heavy Guns Carrier for the Romanian Special Operations Forces. This request valued at US$43.73 million was approved by the US Congress and in July 2021, it was announced that a contract was made to supply Romania and other nations with the JLTV. A complementary request was made for 95 additional M1278 HGC valued at US$104 million for the Romanian Army and was approved by the US Congress in March 2023. Romania received the first 33 JLTVs in November 2023.
Slovakia (160)
Slovakia decided to order JLTVs after the United States approved a grant worth $200 million to modernize the Slovak Armed Forces under the condition that the money from the grant would only be used to purchase military equipment from the United States. Originally, the Slovak Ministry of Defence originally wanted to acquire 192 JLTVs, in the M1278A1/A2 Heavy Gun Carrier variant, but due to the increased cost of all additional equipment only 160 vehicles could be acquired with just the money from the US grant. In May 2023, the US State Department approved the sale of up to 192 vehicles for $250 million. In July 2023, the Slovak Defence Ministry accepted an offer for 160 JLTV for US$190 million through the FMF grant. 110 JLTV are to be equipped with the Kongsberg M153 CROWS remote station, and the other 50 with a manned weapon station. Deliveries began in January 2026, and have continued since, with the vehicles being completed in Slovakia.
Slovenia (129)
Slovenia Ministry of Defense signed a Letter of Offer and Acceptance (LOA) with the U.S. government in October 2018 for the purchase of 38 JLTV (local designation: LKOV) in the M1278 Heavy Guns Carrier variant. The order to Oshkosh by the U.S. government was announced in February 2020. The delivery of this batch took place at the port of Luka Koper in May 2021. At that time, the minister of defense announced an interest for 99 additional JLTV. Regarding the equipment, all are to be equipped with the Kongsberg M153 CROWS remote weapon station. These are fitted with a M2 machine gun and capable to shoot the Spike LR and Spike LR2 which are in service in the Slovenian Army. In September 2021, Slovenia Ministry of Defense signed an agreement with the U.S. Government for the purchase of 37 JLTV. The delivery of this batch took place in December 2023. In December 2022, another order for 47 vehicles obtained via direct commercial sale was placed in the same variant, with a delivery planned for 2024. The US will also donate 7 JLTV. As of January 2024, 75 JLTV were delivered, and 54 additional are to be delivered. The plan is to reach a total fleet of 161 JLTV.
United States (approx. 19,150 delivered, all U.S. Army orders are cancelled, USMC is still ordering.)
U.S. Army (estimated 15,000 as of January 2025), U.S. Marine Corps and U.S. Air Force – Original contract award in August 2015. Overall requirements have fluctuated, but as of January 2022 were stated by Michael Sprang, JLTV Project Director to be 49,099 for the Army; approximately 12,500 for the Marine Corps; 2,000 for the Air Force (dependent on funding); and approximately 400 for the Navy. The initial JLTV contract award had a potential value of US$6.749 billion and called for a maximum of 16,901 JLTV. The second sole source to Oshkosh contract allows for 6,262 JLTV to be ordered by November 2023. The JLTV re-compete award will allow for 15,586 JLTV when awarded. Current U.S. Army and Marines orders are for around 19,150 JLTV.

=== Future operators ===
Mongolia (unknown quantity)
In November 2023, it is mentioned in official documents that JLTV were ordered by the US for Foreign Military Sales to the Mongolian Army. No mention of the quantity, or the price of the order is made in the document.
Uruguay (20)
In May 2023, a specialized Spanish defense website announced that the United States government approved the transfer of 20 JLTV to the Armed Forces of Uruguay with Global Peace Operations Initiative (GPOI) funds.
Netherlands (> 150)
150 Oshkosh JLTV ordered in April 2025 by the Netherlands MOD for the Royal Netherlands Marine Corps as part of the FLATM-PV programme (Future Littoral All Terrain Mobility – Patrol Vehicle). The vehicle will be known as the DXPV (Dutch Expeditionary Patrol Vehicles) and in Dutch service will be named Kaaiman.
- First contract: signed in June 2025, with deliveries expected to start in 2028.
- Second contract: complementary order in January 2026, worth €23.0 to 28.0 million.
Canada (60)
In August 2025, the U.S. State Department approved a $160M US Foreign Military Sale of 60 JLTVs to be accompanied by 9 JLTV cargo trailers, as well as communication equipment and other hardware. The vehicles would replace CANSOFCOM's fleet of HMMWV under the Next Generation Fighting Vehicle project.

=== Potential operators ===
Greece (unknown quantity)
The Hellenic Army mentioned the potential purchase of JLTV to be equipped with various equipments as an option:
- In June 2022, the Hellenic Army General Staff met with representatives from Elbit Systems after showing interest in the acquisition of SPEAR 120mm mortar systems mounted on the JLTV.
- In April 2023, the Hellenic Army ordered Spike missiles for €370 million. As part of the variants ordered, Greece mentions the Spike NLOS. In its terrestrial use, it would be installed on the Plasan SandCat or the JLTV.
Poland (26)
In December 2022, U.S. Congress approved the sale of 26 M1279A1 JLTV to Poland as part of a package of military sales to Poland. In January 2023, the order of the 116 M1A1 was confirmed, with this confirmation, 12 M88A2, 8 M1110, 6 M577 and 26 M1152A1 workshop Humvees was confirmed with their logistic package, but no mention of the JLTV.
Portugal (230 planned)
Portuguese Army – In April 2020, Portugal announced that it would be seeking to procure the JLTV through the US Foreign Military Sales program. The intention was expressed to Janes by Lieutenant Colonel Ricardo Manuel dos Santos Camilo, head of the capabilities branch of the army general staff's force planning division. In 2019, EUR79 million (US$86 million) was allocated to the revised Portuguese Military Programming Law for the acquisition of the JLTV by 2030 for further army modernisation. The total procurement was under review and it was stated that it could change. If purchased, the JLTV would replace the Land Rover Defender series and the Toyota Land Cruiser HZJ73LV vehicles used by the Portuguese Army. In 2023, it was reported that 230 JLTVs are to be procured.
United Kingdom (up to 2,747)
British Army – In June 2016 it was reported that to meet Package 1 of the Multi Role Vehicle-Protected (MRV-P) requirement, the UK Ministry of Defence (MoD) was in talks with the Pentagon on acquiring the JLTV via the Foreign Military Sales (FMS) route. “We can confirm that we are talking to the US DOD regarding Package 1 [of MRV-P], to inform our understanding of an FMS option for the Joint Light Tactical Vehicle,” said an MoD spokesman. It was stated in January 2017 by Maj. Gen. Robert Talbot Rice, the director of land equipment at the Defence Equipment and Support arm of the Ministry of Defence (MoD), that: "We are working through the Foreign Military Sales process. A letter of request has been sent to our American colleagues, and we expect a response in the next few months." Talbot Rice told an audience of industry executives and military personnel at the International Armoured Vehicles conference in London on 24 January that the Army had opted for the single-source purchase due to its ability to meet UK requirements and its value for money. In July 2017, the DSCA notified the US Congress of a possible sale of 2,747 JLTV vehicles and accessories to the UK. Jane's Defence Weekly reported in September 2019 that approval for the JLTV to enter the demonstration phase was received in April 2019 and that once the demonstration phase was complete in 2021, a new business case would be submitted to the MoD for approval to enter full rate production. The requirement at that time stood at 821 vehicles for the Army and Marines. In June 2022, it was announced that the Package 1 Multi Role Vehicle-Protected (MRV-P) requirement purchase would not move forward; cancellation of the MRV-P Package 1 is not a direct cancellation of the JLTV acquisition, and actually a result of the British Army reviewing its protected mobility needs after the 2021 Integrated Review and associated Command Paper. Delaying any JLTV purchase will also allow the UK to await the outcome of the US Army JLTV recompete process.

=== Evaluation only ===
Australia
As part of the program Project Land 121 Phase 4 – Protected Mobility Vehicle (Light) (PMV-L), Australia evaluated several options, among which, the possibility to purchase the JLTV that was being developed by the USA. In the end, the Thales Hawkei won the competition.
Japan
Japan was looking for a successor of the Komatsu LAV. The JLTV was one of the competitors, but only the Mowag Eagle V and the Thales Hawkei were pre-selected for evaluation.

== Gallery ==
Oshkosh L-ATV (Light Combat Tactical All-Terrain Vehicle)

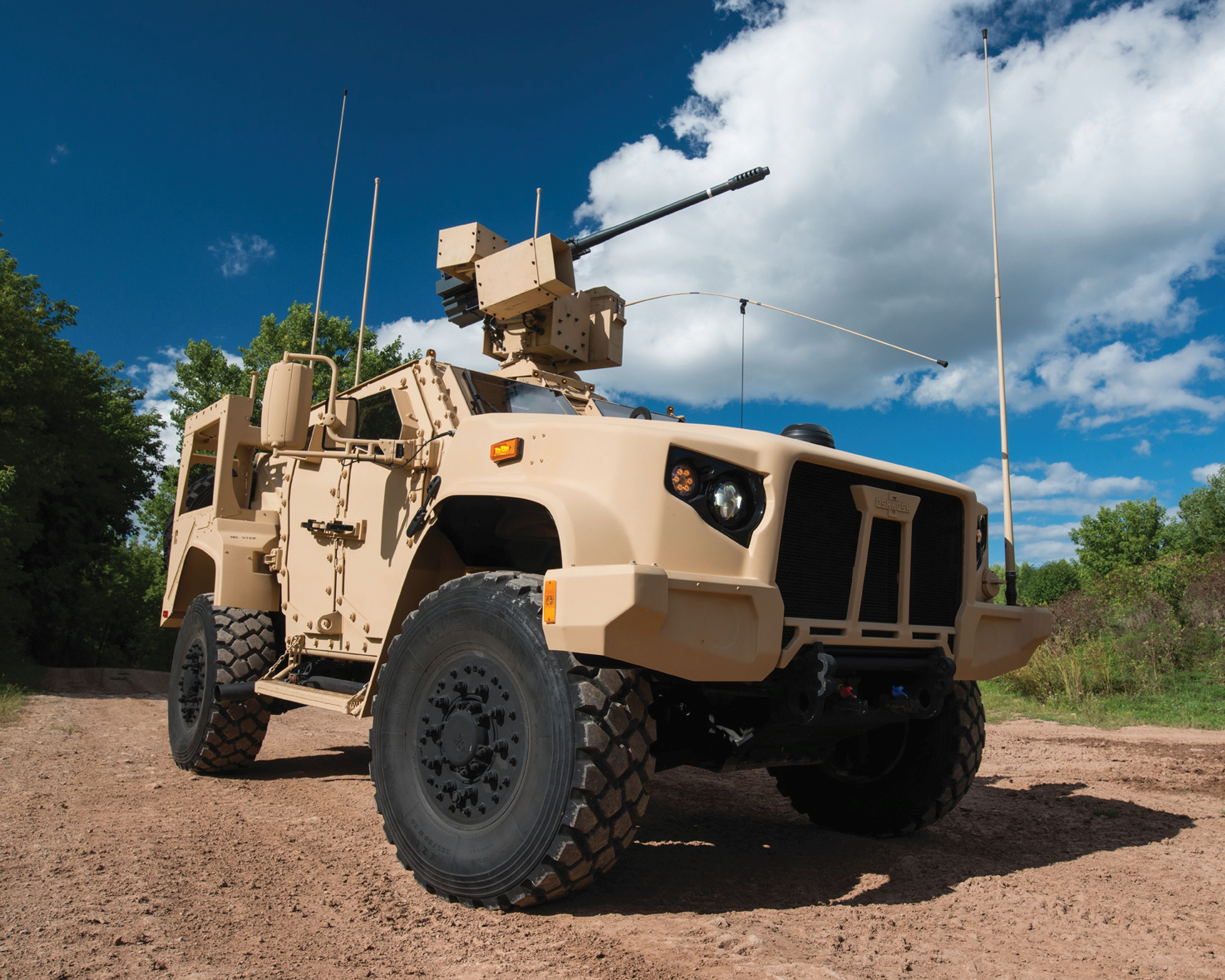
Oshkosh L-ATV in M1278 Heavy Guns Carrier JLTV configuration and fitted with an EOS R-400S-MK2 remote weapon system integrated with Orbital ATK's M230 LF 30 mm lightweight automatic chain gun

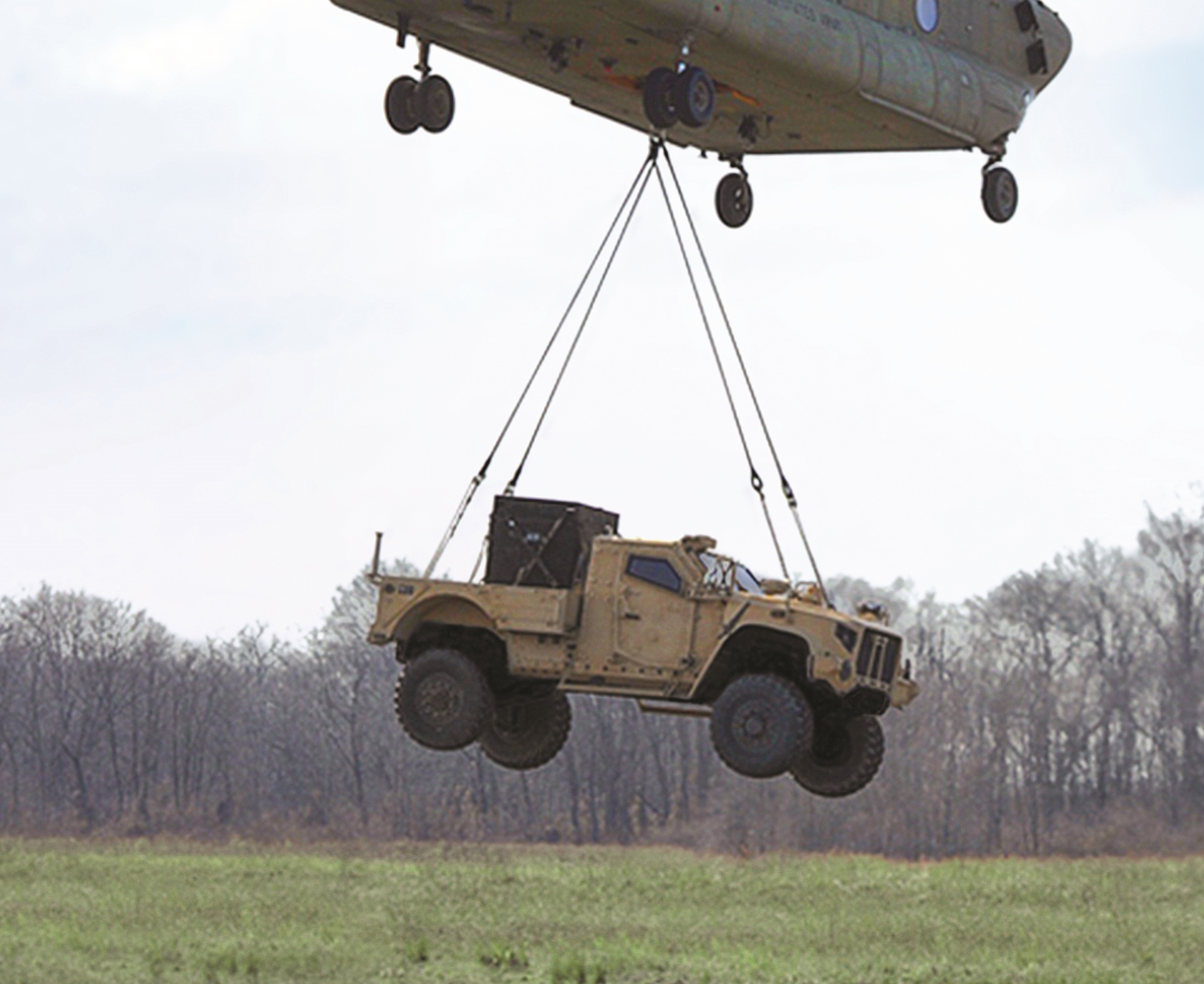
Oshkosh L-ATV in M1279 JLTV Utility configuration undergoing air-transport trials

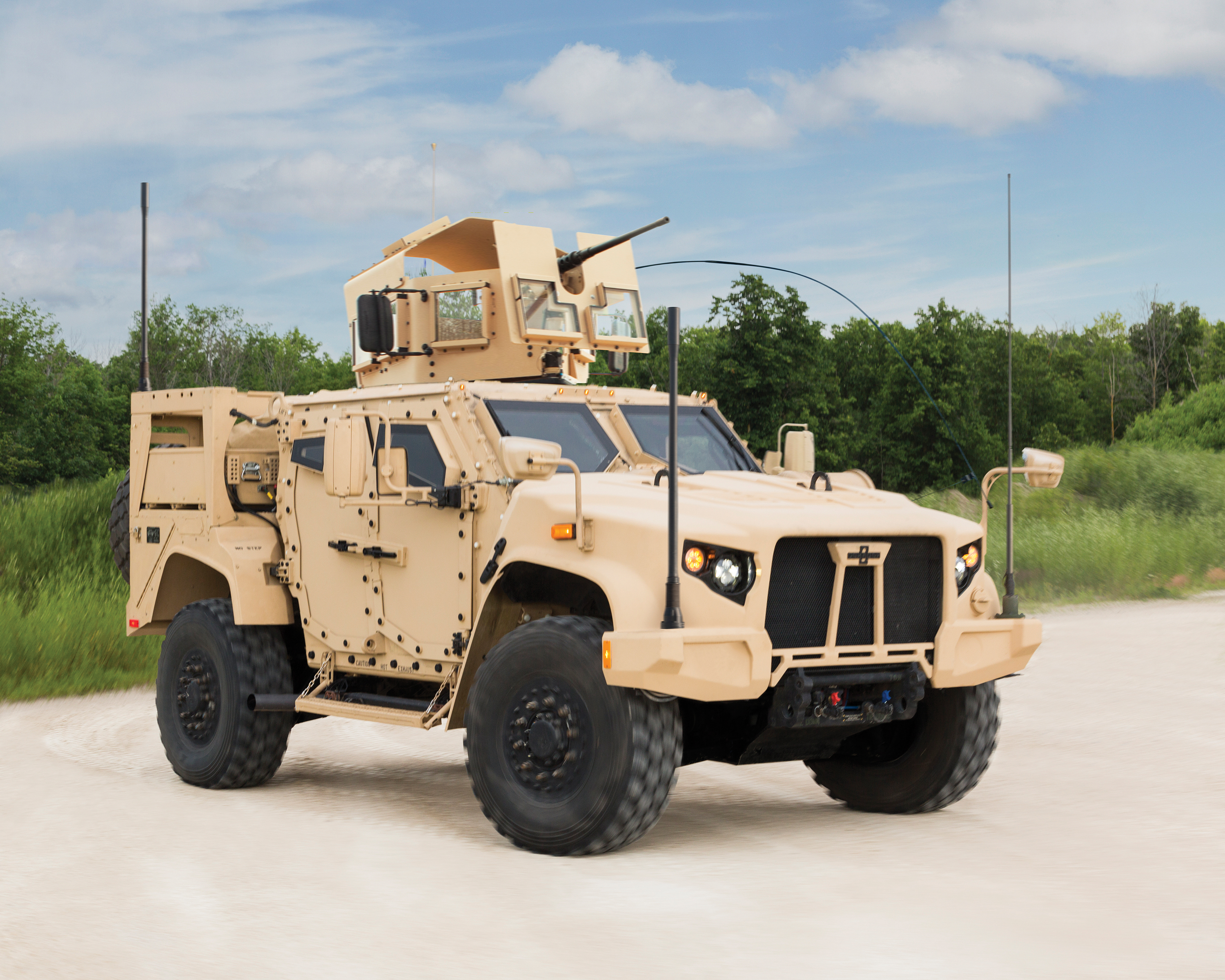
Oshkosh L-ATV in M1278 Heavy Guns Carrier JLTV configuration with Objective Gunner Protection Kit (OGPK)

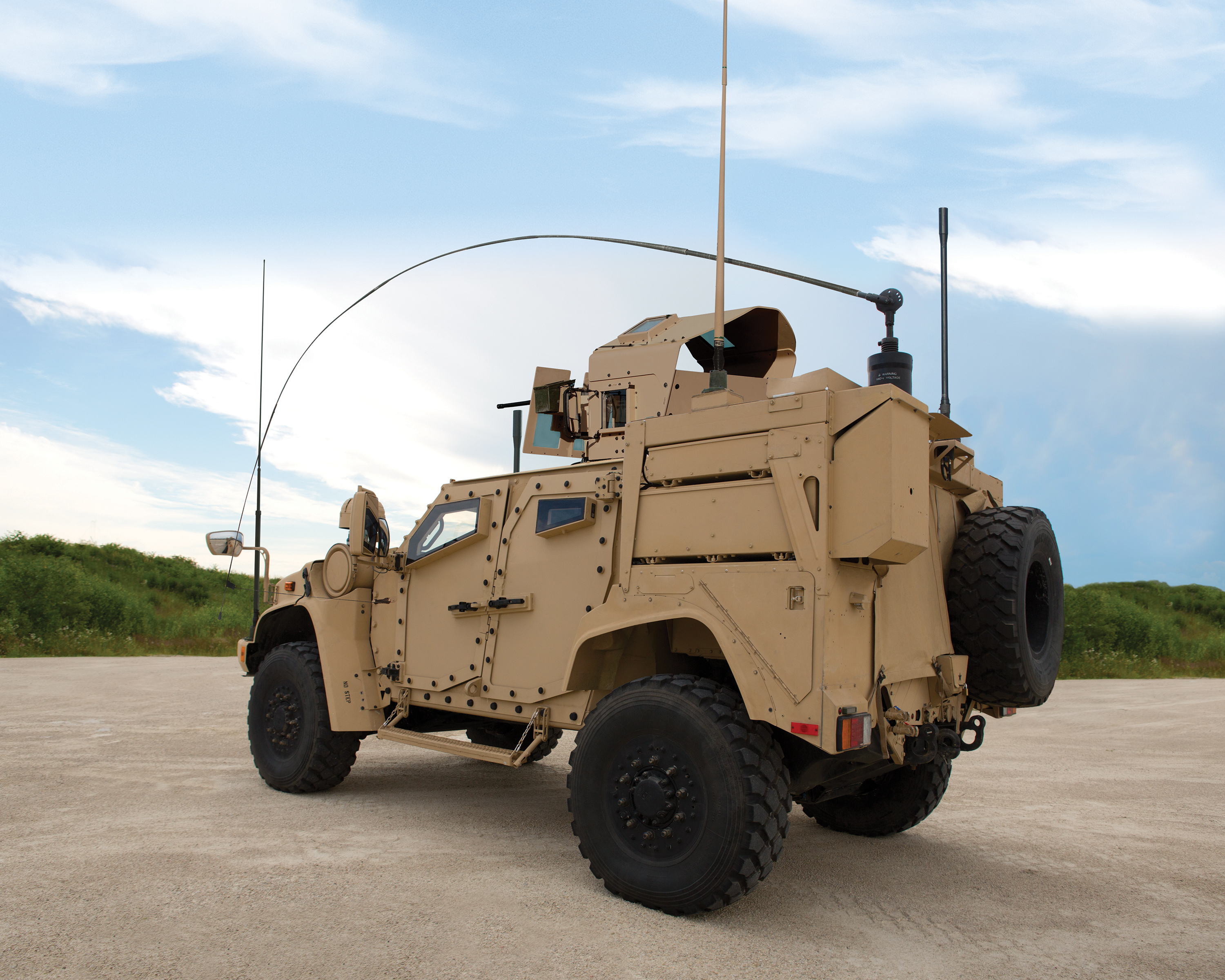
Rear three-quarter view of an Oshkosh L-ATV in M1278 Heavy Guns Carrier JLTV configuration

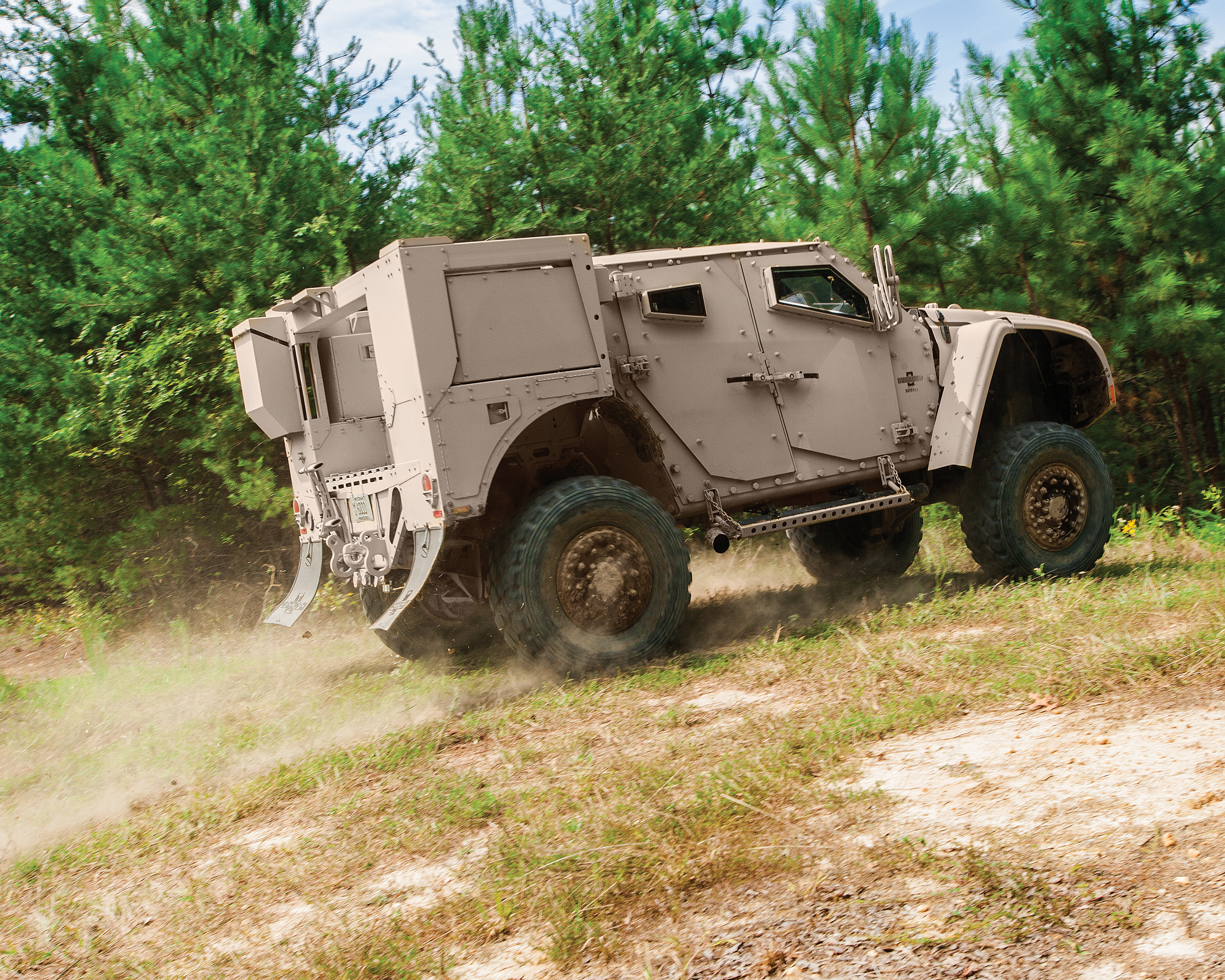
Oshkosh L-ATV in M1280 General Purpose JLTV configuration during trials

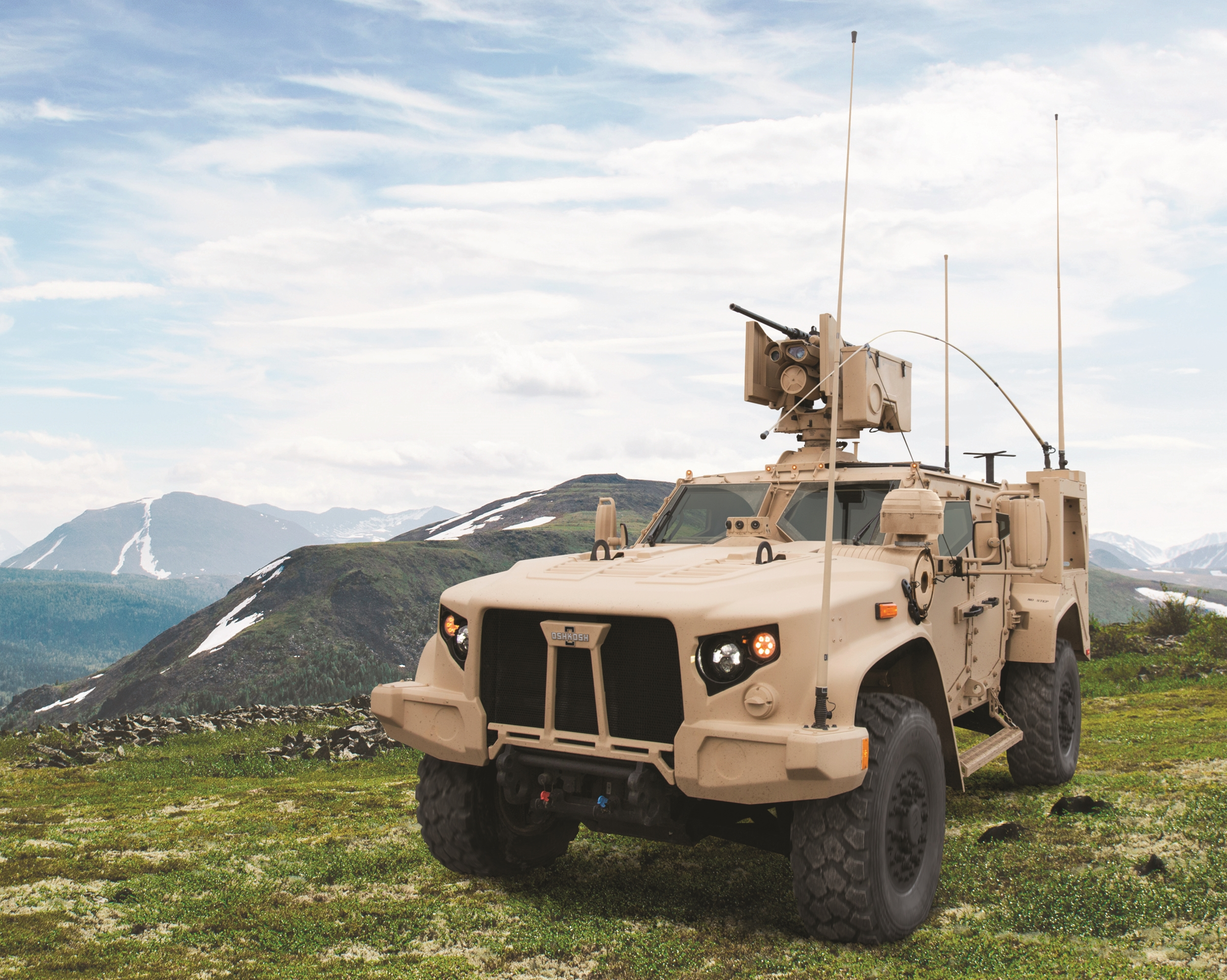
Oshkosh L-ATV configured as M1278 Heavy Guns Carrier

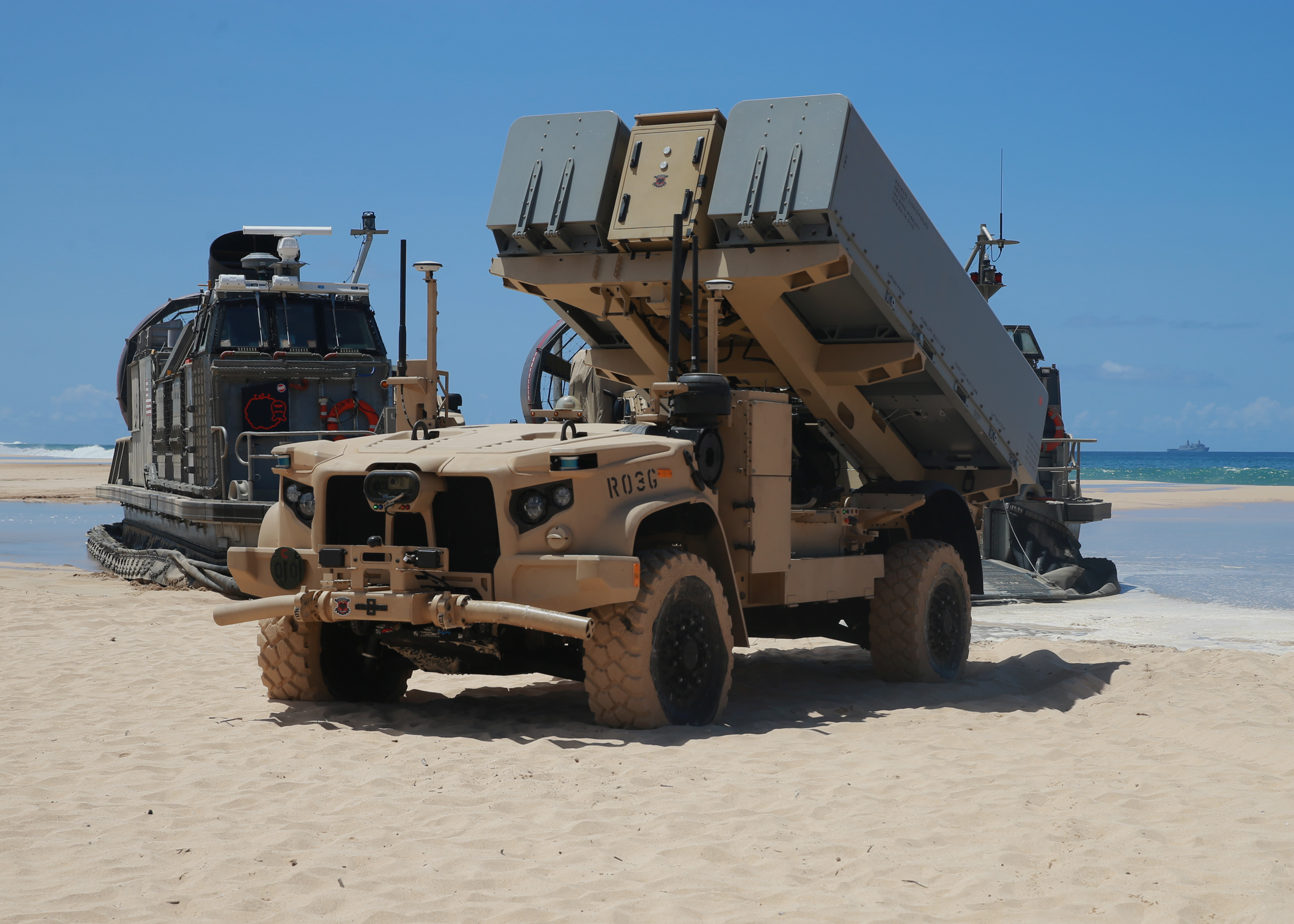
In December 2019, the Marine Corps tested a version of the JLTV called ROGUE Fires, which consists of an unmanned JLTV-based mobile launch platform carrying a Naval Strike Missile launcher unit.

== See also ==
- Joint Light Tactical Vehicle program (JTLV)
- Oshkosh M-ATV
- Palletized Load System (PLS)
- Medium Tactical Vehicle Replacement (MTVR)
- Family of Medium Tactical Vehicles (FMTV)
- Heavy Equipment Transport System (HET)
- Logistic Vehicle System Replacement (LVSR)
