= CTV =

CTV may refer to:

== Television ==
- Connected TV, or Smart TV, a TV set with integrated internet

=== North America and South America ===
- CTV Television Network, a Canadian television network owned by Bell Media
  - CTV 2, a secondary Canadian television network owned by Bell Media
  - CTV Atlantic, a system of four television stations in the Canadian Maritime provinces
  - CTV Comedy Channel
  - CTV Drama Channel
  - CTVglobemedia, now owned by Canadian telecom giant Bell Canada as Bell Media
  - CTV Life Channel
  - CTV News
  - CTV News Channel (Canadian TV channel)
  - CTV Sci-Fi Channel
- C TV, a Trinidad and Tobago broadcast television station
- Citizens Television, an American public access network in Connecticut
- CTV: The Comedy Network, former name of Comedy Central, an American television channel

=== Asia ===
- China Television, a Taiwanese television company, established 1968
  - CTV Main Channel
  - CTV News Channel (Taiwan)
  - CTV Classic
- CTV (Japan) or Chūkyō Television Broadcasting, a television station in Nagoya, Japan
- Commercial Television (Hong Kong TV station), a defunct television station in Hong Kong
- CTV (Indonesia), a television station in Indonesia

=== Europe ===
- ITV Channel Television, an ITV region for the Channel Islands
- CTV (Bath), the University of Bath's student television station, "Campus TV"
- CTV (pay television), a defunct analogue satellite television platform in Scandinavia
- Vatican Television Center (Centro Televisivo Vaticano), the Vatican's TV channel
- ČTV, a former channel of Czech Television, Czech Republic

=== Africa ===
- CTV (Egyptian TV channel), the official Coptic Orthodox TV station broadcasting in Arabic
- Cape Town TV, a South African television station

=== Oceania ===
- Canterbury Television, a New Zealand television station
  - CTV Building, a building that collapsed during the 2011 Christchurch earthquake
- CTV 41 Bendigo, a former Australian community television station in Bendigo

== Other uses ==
- Citrus tristeza virus, a viral species that causes disease in citrus plants
- Combat Tactical Vehicle (Technology Demonstrator)
- Confederación de Trabajadores de Venezuela, a federation of labor unions in Venezuela
- Corpo Truppe Volontarie, the Italian expeditionary force in the Spanish Civil War
- Crew transfer vessel, a vessel specialized in the transport of offshore support
- Gorgon (missile family), CTV-4 and CTV-₰6

== See also ==
- CCTV (disambiguation)
- CTV Building (disambiguation)
- Color television
- ITV Central (previously Central Independent Television), an ITV region for the English West Midlands
