= CNTV =

CNTV may refer to:

- China Network Television, a Chinese web-based TV broadcaster
- National Television Council (Chile) (Spanish: Consejo Nacional de Televisión), a Chilean government agency overseeing television
- National Television Commission (Colombia), (Spanish: Comisión Nacional de Television), a Colombian government agency overseeing television; see Television in Colombia
- Chinese News TV, a Philippine TV channel; see 2019 in Philippine television
- USC School of Cinema-Television (CNTV), former name of the USC School of Cinematic Arts

== See also ==
- CNT (disambiguation)
- CTV (disambiguation)
- NTV (disambiguation)
- CN (disambiguation)
- TV (disambiguation)
