= NATC =

NATC may refer to:

- Naval Air Test Center, a center for the United States Navy
- Naval Air Training Command, a United States Navy command that administers the training of students in the aviation field
- NATC Nevada Test Center, see Combat Tactical Vehicle
- National conservatism, a right-wing political ideology
