= CNT =

CNT may refer to:

== Organized labor ==
- Confederación Nacional del Trabajo (CNT), the National Confederation of Labor, a Spanish confederation of anarcho-syndicalist labor unions
- Central Nacional de Trabajadores (CNT), the National Workers' Central (Paraguay), a national trade union center in Paraguay
- Confédération nationale du travail (CNT-F), the National Confederation of Labour, a French anarcho-syndicalist union
- Confédération Nigérienne du Travail, the Nigerien Confederation of Labour, a trade union federation in Niger
- Plenario Intersindical de Trabajadores - Convención Nacional de Trabajadores PIT-CNT, a national trade union center in Uruguay

== Science and technology ==
- Carbon nanotube, an allotrope of carbon with a cylindrical nanostructure
- Classical nucleation theory
- Computer Network Technology Corporation, an enterprise acquired by McData in January 2005; see Ultra Network Technologies
- Columbia Non-neutral Torus, a small stellarator at the Columbia University Plasma Physics Laboratory in New York City

== Television ==
- Central Nacional de Televisão (CNT), or Central National Television, a Brazilian television network in Curitiba/Paraná, Brazil
- CNT EP, the public telecommunications company in Ecuador
- Conglomerated National Television, a fictional television network in HD Universe of Grand Theft Auto series.

== Other uses ==
- CN Telecommunications, the former telecommunications unit of Canadian National Railway
- Confectionery, news and tobacco, a retail sector often served by small booths or newsagents
- Cantiere Navale Triestino (CNT), an Austro-Hungarian, later Italian, shipbuilding company founded in 1908 and renamed Cantieri Riuniti dell' Adriatico (CRDA) Monfalcone in 1929
- Commission for New Towns, a former planning and development agency in the UK.
- Center for Neighborhood Technology, an American non-profit organization committed to sustainable development and livable urban communities
- C*nt (Cunt), a swear word
