= CTV Building (disambiguation) =

CTV Building was the headquarters of Canterbury Television in Christchurch, New Zealand.

CTV Building may also refer to one of the following buildings associated with the CTV Television Network in Canada:

- 299 Queen Street West in downtown Toronto
- 9 Channel Nine Court in the Scarborough district of Toronto
- 750 Burrard Street in Vancouver
- Masonic Temple (Toronto) in midtown Toronto, formerly a CTV studio

== See also ==
- CCTV Building
