= Plasan =

Israeli automobile company

- Plasan
- Native name: פלסן סאסא בע"מ
- Type: Privately held company
- Industry: Defence
- Founded: 1985; 41 years ago
- Headquarters: Kibbutz Sasa, Israel
- Area served: Worldwide
- Key people: Moshe Elazar (CEO)
- Products: Survivability, Armored vehicles, Robotics
- Owner: Kibbutz Sasa
- Number of employees: 650
- Subsidiaries: Plasan North America (PNA); AMEFO
- Website: www.plasan.com

Plasan (Hebrew: פלסן) (incorporated as Plasan Sasa Ltd. and formerly as Plasan Sasa (ACS) Ltd.) is an Israeli-based company that now specializes in the design, development and manufacture of protected vehicles, and most recently maneuvering robotics.

The company states it has designed over 420 armored vehicles, and that it has delivered over 40,000 armor solutions worldwide, with more than 25,000 vehicles fitted with Plasan armor delivered to United States Armed Forces.

The company has subsidiaries in France (AMEFO) and the United States, the larger of these, Plasan North America (PNA), established in 2006 as Plasan USA. Tortech Nano Fibres is a 2010-established joint-venture between Plasan and Q-Flo Ltd. of the UK.

== History ==
Plasan Sasa was established in 1985. The Kibbutz Sasa took a decision to move away from agriculture as a means of income and moved towards an industrial base with the purchase of a technology to produce plastic containers from Now Plastics, a US company. The technology acquired made possible the creation of composite materials, and by early 1987 the company was focusing on the production of personal protection, predominantly that of ballistic protection panels found in protective vests.

For growth, the company then expanded into producing larger protective panels for ground vehicles used by the Israel Defense Forces (IDF). This began in 1993 with the delivery of panels for the Abir, M-151, Jeep CJ-8, and later the Sufa. In 1997 Plasan began armouring the IDF's fleet of American-built HMMWVs.

Expansion continued in the late 1990s and in addition to opening a Prototype Department, the company began to assemble its armour solutions in-house, this activity having previously been contracted out. In 1996 the first export sales were made, with Plasan supplying protection solutions to Germany's Krauss-Maffei Wegmann. These were fitted to German Army trucks in the former Yugoslavia. Exposure to the Yugoslavia conflict initiated the development of a mine blast protection concept by Plasan.

The future lucrative American market was also first penetrated in the late 1990s, with a protection solution for HMMWV ambulance variants being supplied to AM General.

Plasan provided its first solutions for air platforms in 1998, supplying armor to Singapore for C-130 aircraft and Super Puma helicopters.

The next significant step in the growth of the company came in the early 2000s. Greek state-owned ELVO assembled HMMWVs in Greece as a partner of AM General. With their first full vehicle body design, Plasan shipped protection kits to Greece for weld-free assembly on the ELVO line and then fitting onto chassis supplied by AM General.

It would however be the Iraq and Afghan conflicts that would have the greatest impact on the development of the company. In one year alone (2005), the company's turnover tripled from $45 million to $150 million.

Following on from the development of an armoured cab for the UK MoD's Oshkosh Medium Tactical Vehicle Replacement (MTVR) fronted Wheeled Tanker, the US Marines between 2005 and 2010 would order 7000 cab armouring kits and 2300 armoured troop transport bodies for their Oshkosh MTVR fleet.

The next significant development for Plasan would be the partnering with Navistar Defense for the US Department of Defense's (DOD's) Mine Resistant Ambush Protected (MRAP) program. The Navistar/Plasan offering, the MaxxPro differed from the majority of competitive designs in that it was not built around a monocoque all-steel welded hull, but was what Plasan named the Kitted Hull concept. The Kitted Hull concept, which had been produced in small quantities previously, and was the start point for Plasan's developing SandCat product, is stated by the company to enable up to ten times faster production than welding alone.

The Kitted Hull concept involves the bolting and bonding of steel, composite and other panels to an existing chassis. In total approaching 9000 MaxxPro would be produced between 2007 and 2011. Working with Navistar, Plasan would also develop the MXT for UK armed forces.

At the peak of MaxxPro production Plasan was also actively involved in the first stage of the US’ Joint Light Tactical Vehicle (JLTV) program. Teamed with Oshkosh and Northrop Grumann, the bid was unsuccessful, but the kitted hull JLTV design was almost immediately revised and Oshkosh would in 2009 be awarded the M-ATV (MRAP-All-Terrain Vehicle) contract. In total, 8722 M-ATVs were delivered to US armed forces, and at the peak of production Plasan was producing over 1000 Kitted Hulls per month.

Plasan's US facility had opened in 2006 and from 2008 this facility produced quantities of parts for MTVR, MaxxPro and M-ATV orders, with peak production reaching 250 M-ATV kits per month.

The actual JLTV program would not conclude until a contract award in 2015 to Oshkosh. For the original JLTV Plasan was a design partner of Oshkosh, and for the follow-on JLTV contract that was awarded to AM General in 2023, under a $300 million deal Plasan North America will supply cab components for up to 20,683 JLTVs.

Slightly smaller and lighter than the JLTV is the Australian Hawkei, produced by Thales. Hawkei was selected ahead of JLTV and other offerings in 2010 to meet an Australian Army requirement. Around 1100 Hawkei have been ordered, Hawkei's Kitted Hull protection solution designed and manufactured by Plasan.

Since 2010 Plasan has worked with General Dynamics on the Piranha family and its LAV and Stryker derivatives in a variety of protection areas including underbelly, kinetic energy, RPG, spall liners, and energy absorbing seats.

In 2012 the company made its first foray into the naval section by participating in a tender initiated by BAE Systems of the UK for what would develop to be the Type 26 Frigate.

In 2018 Plasan commenced a cooperation with Hanwha of South Korea that includes protection solutions for the Redback IFV and its Elbit-supplied turret, and the Huntsman AS9 155 mm self-propelled gun (SPG).

In 2021 the company unveiled the All-Terrain electric Mission Module (ATeMM), this a diversification from protection and into manoeuvring robotics. Also in 2022 the company announced the retirement of Dani Ziv. Ziv joined the fledgling company in 1985, and by 1987 had been appointed full-time CEO, a position he would hold until his retirement.

In 2023 the company delivered the first examples of the latest and current iteration of the SandCat product. The evolving SandCat range are a light protected vehicle based on the chassis and automotives of a Ford F550, this mated to a Plasan Kitted Hull solution. The current iteration is known as SandCat Tigris.

== Core business areas and products ==
From a company that initially focused on the production of personal protection, Plasan quickly evolved to offer protection packages for light vehicles, then to designing protected vehicles, and in 1998 and 2010 expanded from the land environment to encompass the air and sea environments, respectively. Most recently, the expansion and diversification has continued into the field of maneuvering robotics.

Survivability solutions (land): Plasan offers a full suite of survivability/protection solutions for the land environment. Ballistic protection from STANAG 4569 Level 1 through to Level 6 are offered by the company. Protection against land mine blast and Improvised Explosive Device (IED) blast, including under belly Explosively Formed Penetrator (EFP) threats up to STANAG Level 4 and beyond are also offered. For protection against rocket-propelled grenade attack, Plasan offers Hybrid Slat Fence (HSF), a bar-type armor that is constructed of a hybrid of composite and metal, and is around 20% the weight of a traditional steel solution, weighing around 10 kg/m^{2}. For internal protection, spall liners are offered, these weighing 10-20 kg/m^{2} and are between 10 and 20 mm thick. Plasan also offers blast attenuating seats, these branded Terra (presented TERRA for marketing purposes), with over 20,000 examples delivered globally. Terra blast attenuating seats would usually be used in conjunction with T-Bar blast absorbing footpads.

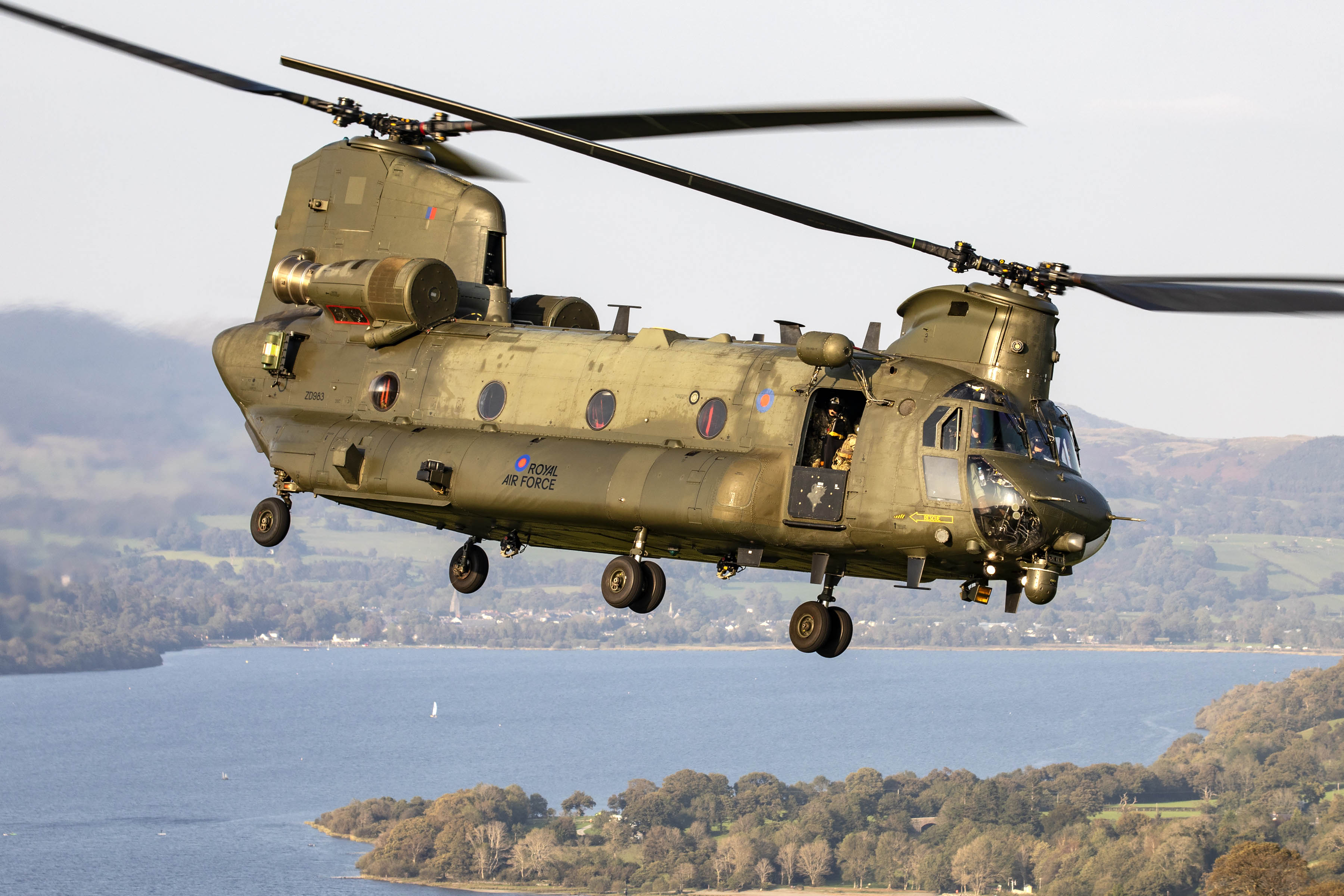
Plasan has provided armor to a selection of Chinook users including the Royal Air Force

Survivability solutions (air): Plasan has provided protection solutions for air assets since 1998. These have included solutions for Lockheed C-130 Hercules and Super Puma for Singapore, Black Hawks for the IDF and Japan, Mil Mi-17 and Alouette for Nepal, CH-47 Chinook for the UK, Netherlands, Spain and Japan, and CM235 and KA-32C of the South Korean Air Force.

Survivability solutions (sea): In 2012 Plasan participated in a ship armouring tender issued by BAE Systems in the UK. Plasan was selected to supply composite armor for the first batch of the Royal Navy's Type 26 frigates, the City-class. In 2018 Australia selected a modified Type 26 as then Hunter Class, and in 2019 Canada placed an order for up to 19 ships based on the Type 26. Plasan will supply the composite armor for the Australian and Canadian ships.

Maneuvering Robotics - All-Terrain electric Mission Module (ATeMM): In 2021 and in a derivation from protection solutions into robotics, Plasan unveiled the All-Terrain electric Mission Module (ATeMM). A single ATeMM module has a single air-sprung, steer-capable portal axle, a kerb weight of 1,600 kg, and a payload of 1,150 kg. Dimensions are 1.8 m x 1.9 m (L x W), and height to loadbed is 1.2 m. ATeMM is battery-powered. The module connects to a conventional vehicle by a triple tow hook rigid coupling that a limited rotation on the pitch and roll axis, and is fixed on the yaw axis. While connected the module can drive or use momentum to recharge the on-board batteries.

Two, three or even four modules can be coupled together, with the resulting platform capability of up to full autonomous operation. As of 2024 pre-production ATeMM are under test in Israel and in United States.

SandCat to SandCat Tigris: The Tigris is the current version of the SandCat, and the type is an IDF-specific configuration. First deliveries were made in 2023. The first examples of the SandCat range were delivered during 2008, and the type is now in its fourth generation. Well over 1000 SandCats, and derivatives of SandCat, have been delivered to more than 15 user countries. The SandCat essentially mates a Plasan-designed Kitted Hull concept body with a Ford F-550 chassis and automotives, the latter uprated and modified by Plasan.

To the fourth generation SandCat range, Plasan added the M-LPV. The M-LPV retains the overall dimensions of the SandCat, but features a chassis less monocoque hull with mine blast protection.

Storm Rider: The Storm Rider was introduced in 2021. The Storm Rider retains many of the Ford F-550 components and Plasan body panels used in the fourth generation SandCat, but overall is a larger and heavier design (11,500 kg GVW) that features full-time all-wheel drive and a fully independent suspension set-up.

EX11: The EX11, which was briefly marketed as the MKT, was introduced in 2022. The EX11 is based on a Ford F-550 chassis and automotives, but the design is not marketed as a SandCat family member by Plasan.

== Other products, activities, subsidiaries and joint ventures ==
Ballistic laboratory: At its facilities in Northern Israel, Plasan has an extensive ballistic laboratory. A laboratory was first established in 1989, but this renovated and extended in 2009, and now occupies 1000m² with two indoor firing tunnels that can test rounds between 5.56 and 30 mm. The laboratory has carried out over 42,000 tests.

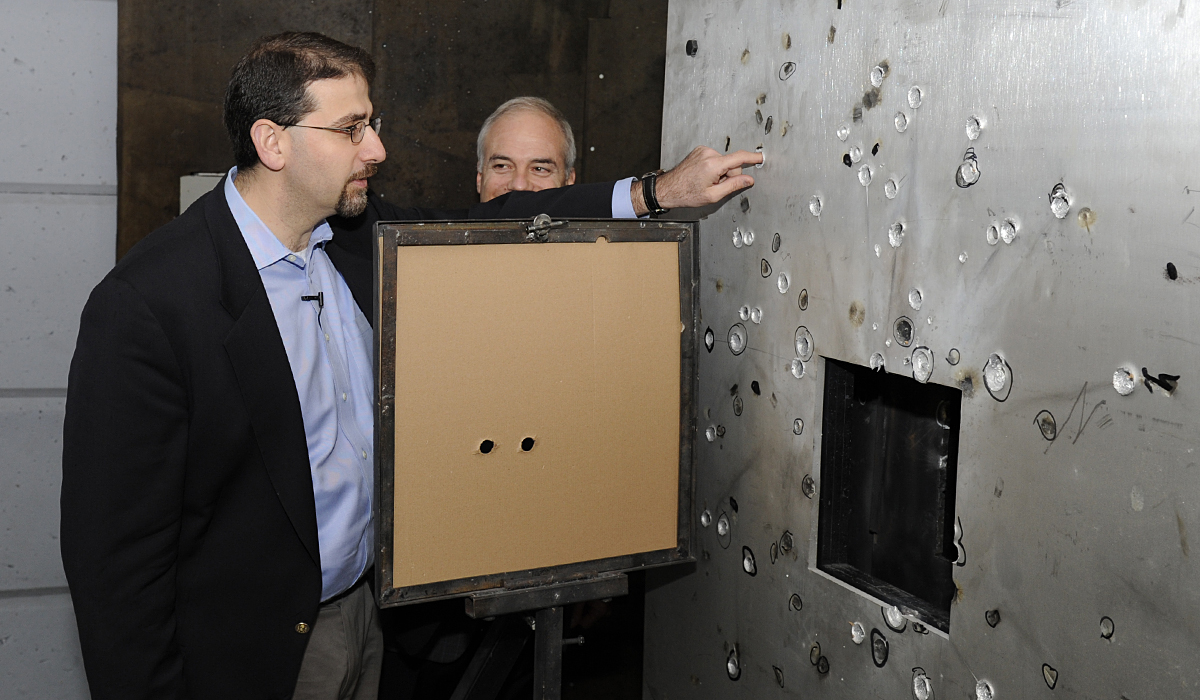
Plasan has an extensive ballistic laboratory, this first established in 1989

Plasan North America (PNA): Plasan North America (PNA) was established in 2006 as Plasan USA and via the acquisition of the Automotive division of Vermont Composites, an automotive composite manufacturing facility. In 2008 Plasan USA was divided into two stand-alone companies, Plasan Carbon Composites (PCC) which manufactured non-armoured composite parts for the automotive industry, including carbon fibre parts for the Chevrolet Corvette, and Plasan North America (PNA) which focused on protection. In 2012 PNA acquired KaZaK Composites.

In 2022, Plasan Carbon Composites ceased trading and its former facilities are now occupied by PNA.

AMEFO: In 2007, Plasan acquired France-based AMEFO, a manufacturer of high hardness steel hulls and metal equipment for the automotive and defence industries. AMEFO currently employs around 50 personnel.

TorTech Nano Fibers Ltd: In 2010 Plasan established TorTech Nano Fibers Ltd as a Joint Venture with UK Q-Flo Ltd. for the production of carbon nanotube fibre for the enhancement of body armor and composite armour systems for vehicles.

Hyrax: The Hyrax is based on the chassis and automotives of the Mercedes-Benz G-Class. A second-generation Hyrax is currently being designed, this based on the latest military G-Chassis chassis.

Stinger: The Stinger light combat vehicle is a Plasan Kitted Hull that fits directly onto an AM General HMMWV chassis. The Stinger concept was unveiled in 2021 as a technology demonstrator.

Wilder: Plasan introduced the Wilder in 2022. Described by the company as the first ultralight armoured armored vehicle, the design concept was to provide the mobility of a lightweight off-road buggy-type design, but with the protection and payload capability of a light armoured vehicle. Wilder was a concept design to demonstrate the technologies and capabilities of Plasan.

Guarder: The Guarder is a protected troop transport that can transport up to 24 fully equipped troops. Protection of STANAG Level 3 is provided. The Guarder is built on a MAN 4x4 truck chassis and weighs 22-tonnes. Six examples were supplied to the San Paolo Police for use at the 2016 Rio Olympics.

== Awards and recognition ==
In May 2017, Plasan Sasa and its CEO, Dani Ziv, received the National Defense Industrial Association's (NDIA) Red Ball Express award, the first non-US organization to do so. The company was recognized by NDIA's Tactical Wheeled Vehicle Division.

== Products ==
The following is an expanded list of vehicles with protection/survivability solutions designed and manufactured by Plasan. It is not considered complete and only includes vehicle types on which Plasan's involvement has been reliably reported. The list is arbitrarily alphabetical, and where available with brevity includes outline details of protection type, timeline, quantity delivered, and any other relative information. Any relevant images used in Gallery will follow the order of listing here in Products.

- AM General HMMWV (Israel; US): Plasan first provided protective plates for IDF HMMWVs in 1997, and from 1998 provided armor for the AM General M997 ambulance HMMWV.
- AM General HMMWV (Greece; M1114GR & M1118GR): The Greek M1114GR and M1118GR supplied in the early 2000s were Plsan's firstfull body design.
- AM General HMMWV (Portugal): An armored HMMWV design for Portugal was delivered from around 2006.
- ATMOS: Plasan provides the armored cab for the ATMOS (Autonomous Truck Mounted howitzer System) manufactured by Soltam Systems.
- Combat Tactical Vehicle: The Combat Tactical Vehicle (Technology Demonstrator) was a testbed vehicle built by the Nevada Automotive Test Center (NATC) as part of Joint Light Tactical Vehicle's developmental effort under contract for the Office of Naval Research (ONR).
- DAF Tropco: Between 2006-2010 Plasan developed and delivered a benign in appearance protection kit for Dutch Army DAF tank transporter tractor units.
- Eitan AFV: Plasan supplies underside protection solutions, energy absorbing seat and RPG protection for the Eitan. The Eitan was developed by the Merkava and Armoured Vehicles Directorate in the IMOD to replace the ageing M113 armoured personnel carrier in use by the Israel Defense Forces. Serial production commenced in 2022.
- Emirate Defense Technology (EDT) Enigma: Plasan supplied the kinetic energy solution and energy absorbing seats for the Enigma, which did not enter production.
- Future Tactical Truck System: The Future Tactical Truck System (FTTS) was a United States armed forces program for which the Operational Requirements Document was drawn up during 2003. FTTS was a proposed two vehicle modular family that was to replace the HMMWV, FMTV, HEMTT, PLS (in certain echelons), and all remaining M35, M809 and M939 series of 2.5 and 5 ton trucks. The FTTS-UV (Utility Vehicle) was to replace the HMMWV, while the FTTS-MSV (Manoeuvre Sustainment Vehicle) was to replace all other types. By 2006 work on FTTS was faltering and the successor FTTS-MSV/UV Advanced Concept Technology Demonstration (ACTD) efforts (with input from other efforts) were used ‘to define requirements’ for future US Army trucks.
- Freightliner M-900 series: Plasan provided armor for various elements of the M900 series of line haul trucks.
- Guarani: Plasan armored the armored the GPK EB01 (Gunner Protection Kit).
- General Dynamics European Land Systems (GDELS) Piranha 4: Plasan supplies kinetic energy solutions, spall liners and RPG protection for the Piranha 4. Switzerland is the only confirmed user of Piranha 4. The first examples were ordered in 2016, and deliveries are scheduled to run until 2025.
- General Dynamics European Land Systems (GDELS) Piranha 5: Plasan supplies kinetic energy solutions, underside protection solutions and energy absorbing seat, RPG protection, and spall liners for the Piranha 5. Piranha 5 entered service in 2015 and is used or ordered by Denmark, Monaco, Spain (as VCR Dragon) and Romania.
- General Dynamics Land Systems - Canada (GDLS-C): Plasan supplies various survivability solutions for the LAV5, LAV6 and ACSV.
- General Dynamics Ajax: Plasan supplies kinetic energy solutions for the Ajax, deliveries of which to the British Army are underway and due to conclude in 2026.
- Hanwha Aerospace AS9 Huntsman: Plasan supplies kinetic energy solutions, underside protection solutions and energy absorbing seat, RPG protection, and spall liners for the AS9, the Australian variant for the K9 Thunder.
- Hanwha Aerospace AS21 Redback: Plasan supplies kinetic energy solutions, underside protection solutions and energy absorbing seat, RPG protection, and spall liners for the Redback, the Australian variant for the K21 IFV.
- International MaxxPro: In total approaching 9000 MaxxPro were produced between 2007-2011. The Maxxpro utilized Plasan's Kitted Hull concept, this involving the bolting and bonding of steel, composite and other panels to an existing chassis. Welding is not required.
- International MXT-MV: As Husky, the MXT-MV was supplied to the British Army for use in Afghanistan.
- Joint Light Tactical Vehicle JLTV; Oshkosh production: Over 18,500 JLTV have been manufactured by Oshkosh as of 2024.
- Joint Light Tactical Vehicle JLTV; AM General production: The follow-on JLTV award was made to AM General. Under a $300 million deal Plasan North America will supply cab components for up to 20,683 JLTVs.
- Lockheed Martin AVA-1: Developmental only.
- Mack Granite: The US Army's M917A3 dump truck is based on a Mack Granite chassis.
- Mahindra Rakshak: Rakshak is a light protected vehicle built on a Mahindra chassis.
- Medium Tactical Vehicle Replacement: Following on from the development of an armoured cab for the UK MoD's MTVR-fronted Wheeled Tanker, the US Marines between 2005-2010 would order 7000 cab armouring kits and 2300 armoured troop transport bodies for their MTVR fleet.
- Nexter VBCI 2: Plasan has supplied RPG protection for the VBCI 2 which is at prototype stage.
- Oshkosh M-ATV: The kitted hull JLTV design of Oshkosh/Northrop-Grumman and Plasan that failed in the JLTV competition was revised and Oshkosh would in 2009 be awarded the M-ATV (MRAP-All-Terrain Vehicle) contract. In total, 8722 M-ATVs were delivered to US armed forces, and at the peak of production Plasan was producing over 1000 Kitted Hulls per month.
- Oshkosh Logistic Vehicle System Replacement (LVSR): Plasan provided the protection solution for the Oshkosh LVSR, just under 700 of which were delivered to the US Marines.
- Oshkosh Heavy Expanded Mobility Tactical Truck (HEMTT): Plasan provided the protection solution for the Oshkosh HEMTT A4, the current production HEMTT.
- Plasan Sand Cat: The first examples of the SandCat range were delivered during 2008, and the type is now in its fourth generation. Well over 1000 SandCats, and derivatives of, have been delivered to more than 15 user countries. The SandCat essentially mates a Plasan-designed Kitted Hull concept body with a Ford F-550 chassis and automotives, the latter uprated and modified by Plasan.
- Plasan Guarder: A large truck-based protected troop transport supplied to Brazil's Police.
- Souvim 2: Plasan supplies RPG protection for the French Army's Souvim 2 mine clearance vehicle, this based on the South African Husky VMMD.
- TATRA: Plasan produces armored cabs for TATRA's T815-7 range of tactical trucks.
- Thales Hawkei: Hawkei was selected in 2010 to meet an Australian Army requirement. Around 1100 Hawkei have been ordered, Hawkei's Kitted Hull protection solution designed and manufactured by Plasan. Plasan is also involved with the Thales Bushmaster, although specific details are unknown.
- Type 16 maneuver combat vehicle: Plasan supplies kinetic energy solutions for the Type 16 maneuver combat vehicle, a wheeled turreted armored vehicle manufactured for the JGSDF by Mitsubishi Heavy Industries.

== Gallery ==
Vehicles and other platforms designed by Plasan, or fitted with Plasan survivability solutions

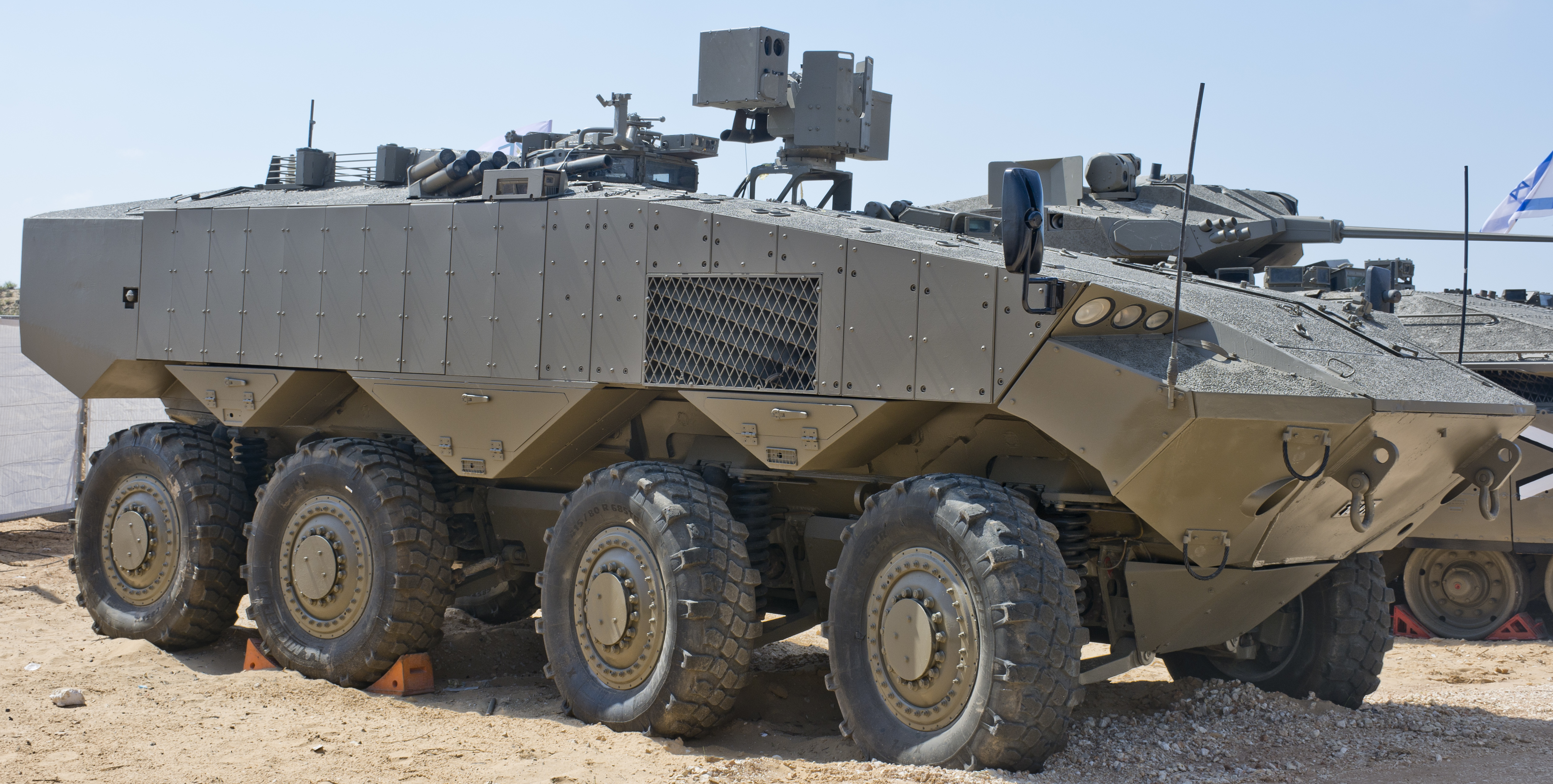
Eitan, entering service with the IDF

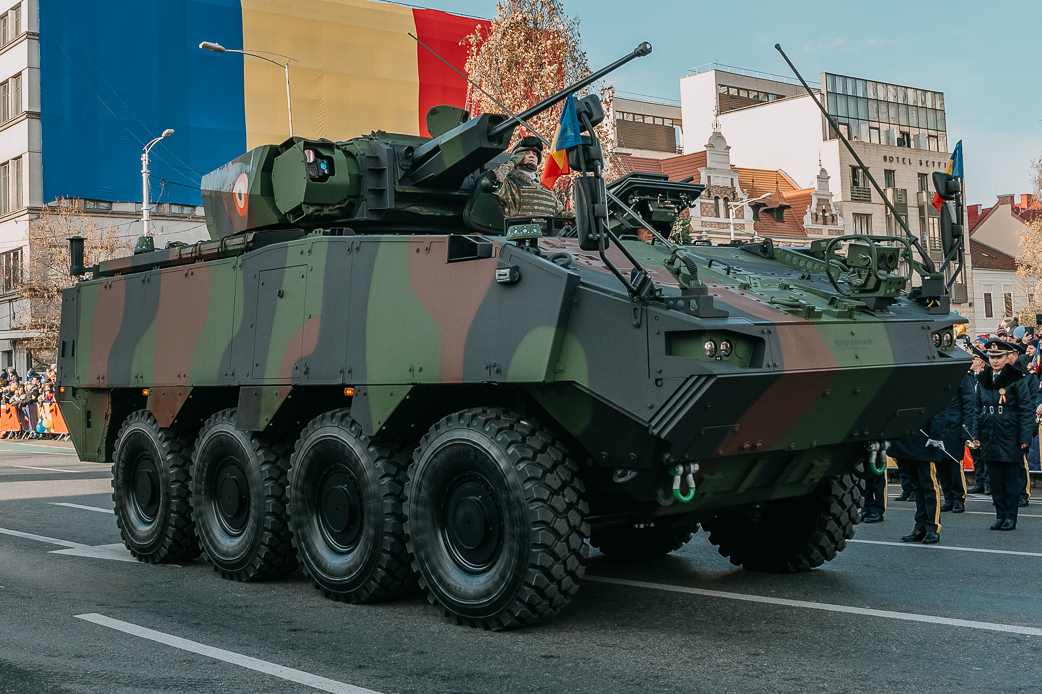
Romanian Piranha 5 with Elbit turret

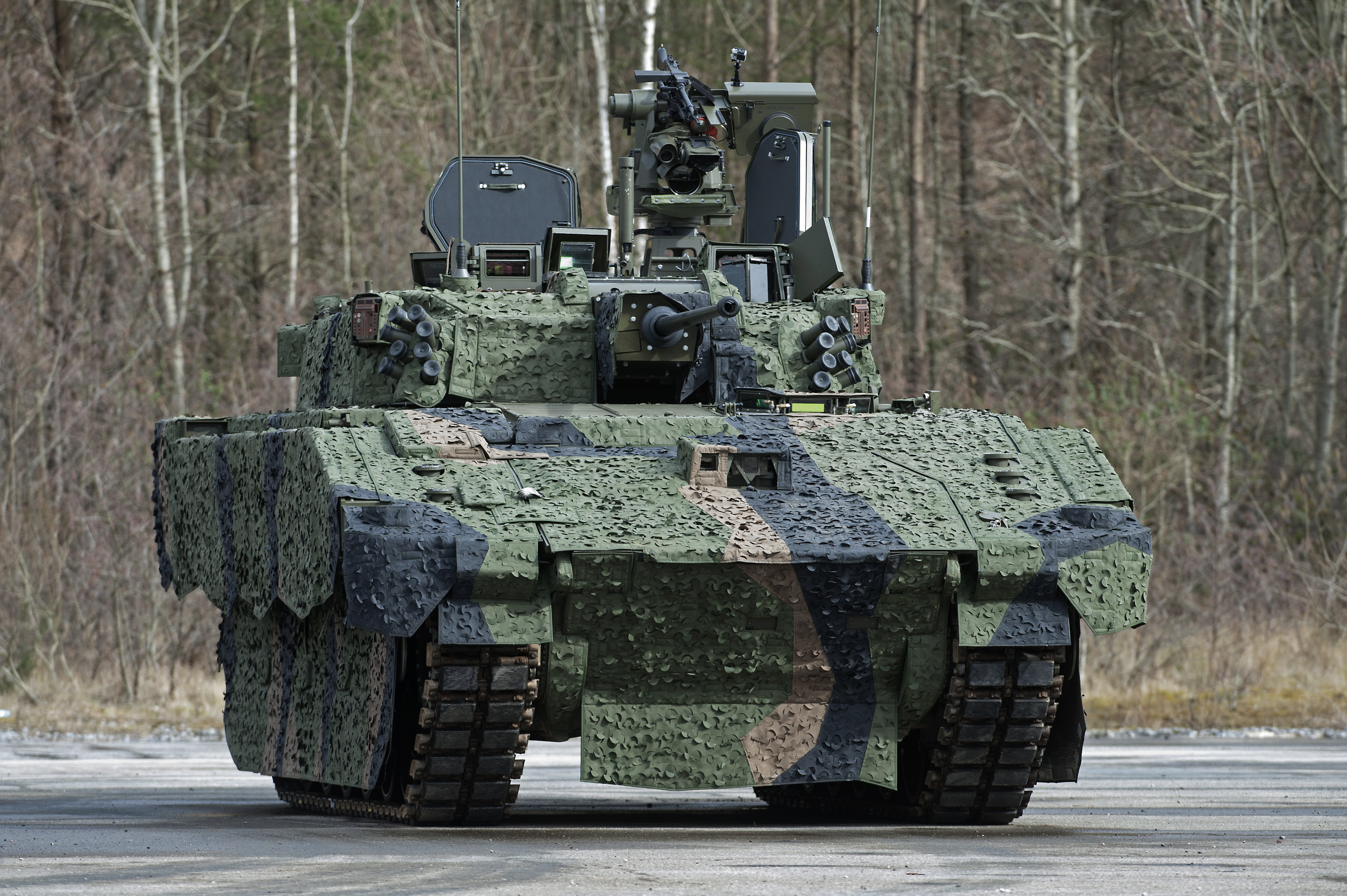
The Ajax is a group of armoured fighting vehicles being developed for the British Army

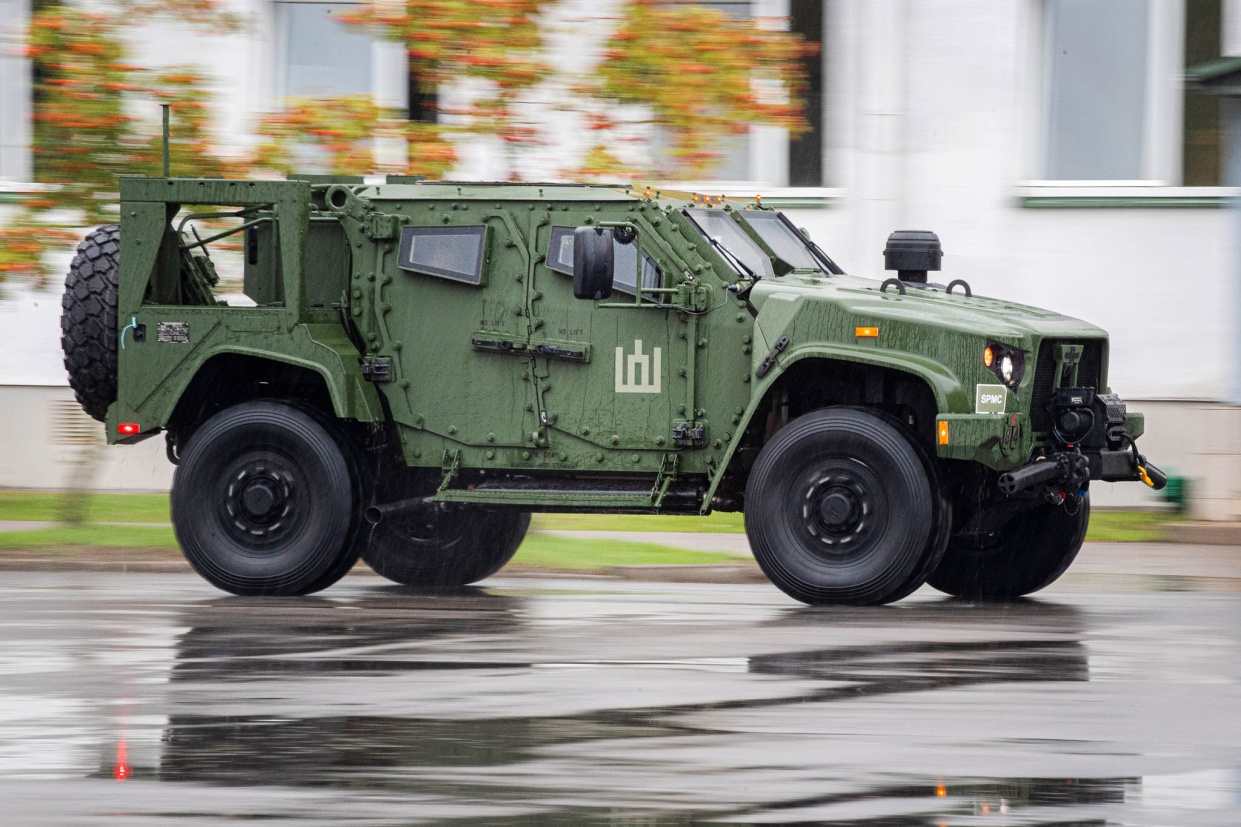
Plasan provided components for Oshkosh JLTVs, and under a $300 million deal will supply cab components for up to 20,683 AM General produced JLTVs

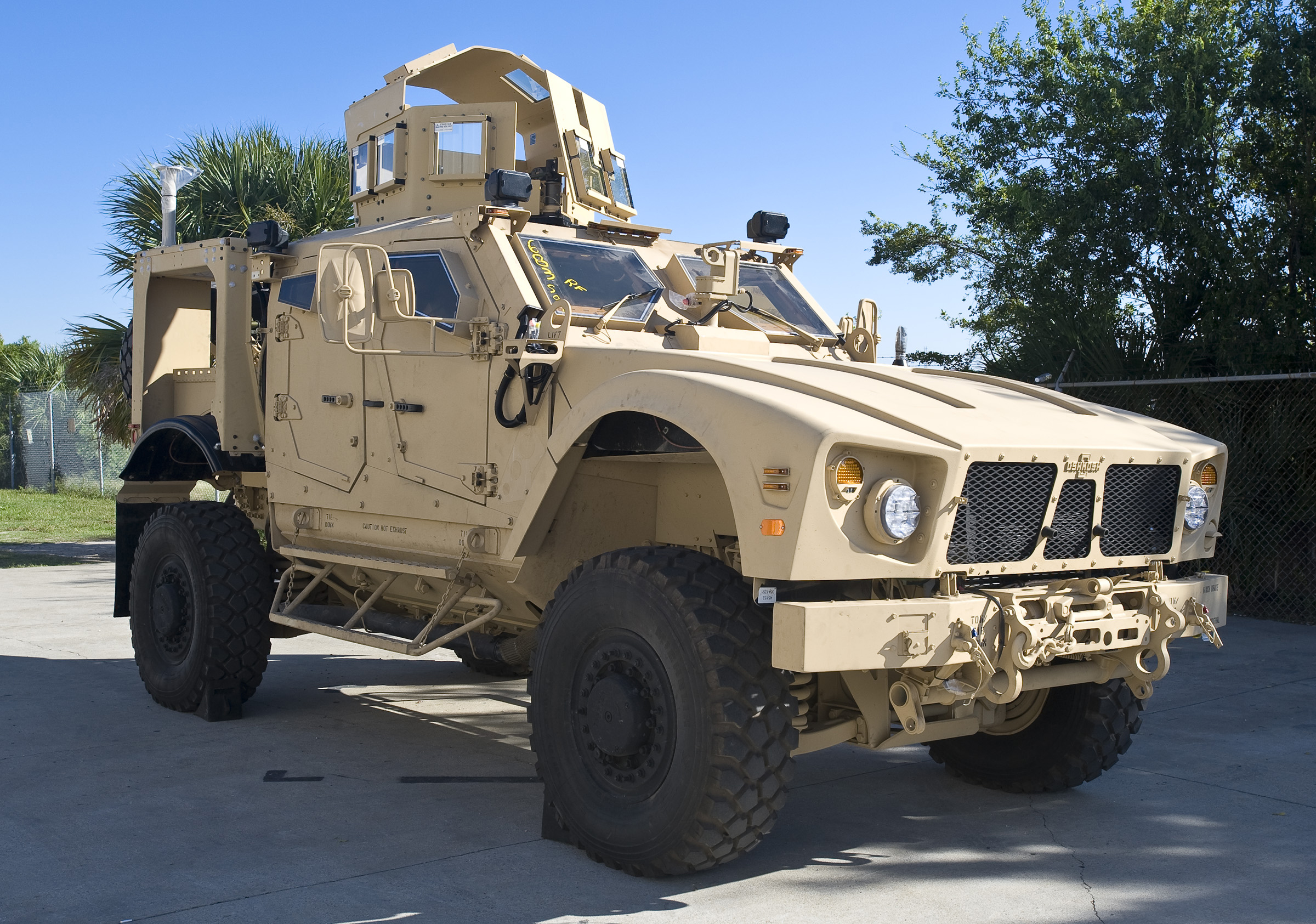
Oshkosh M-ATV; an exponent of Plasan's Kitted Hull

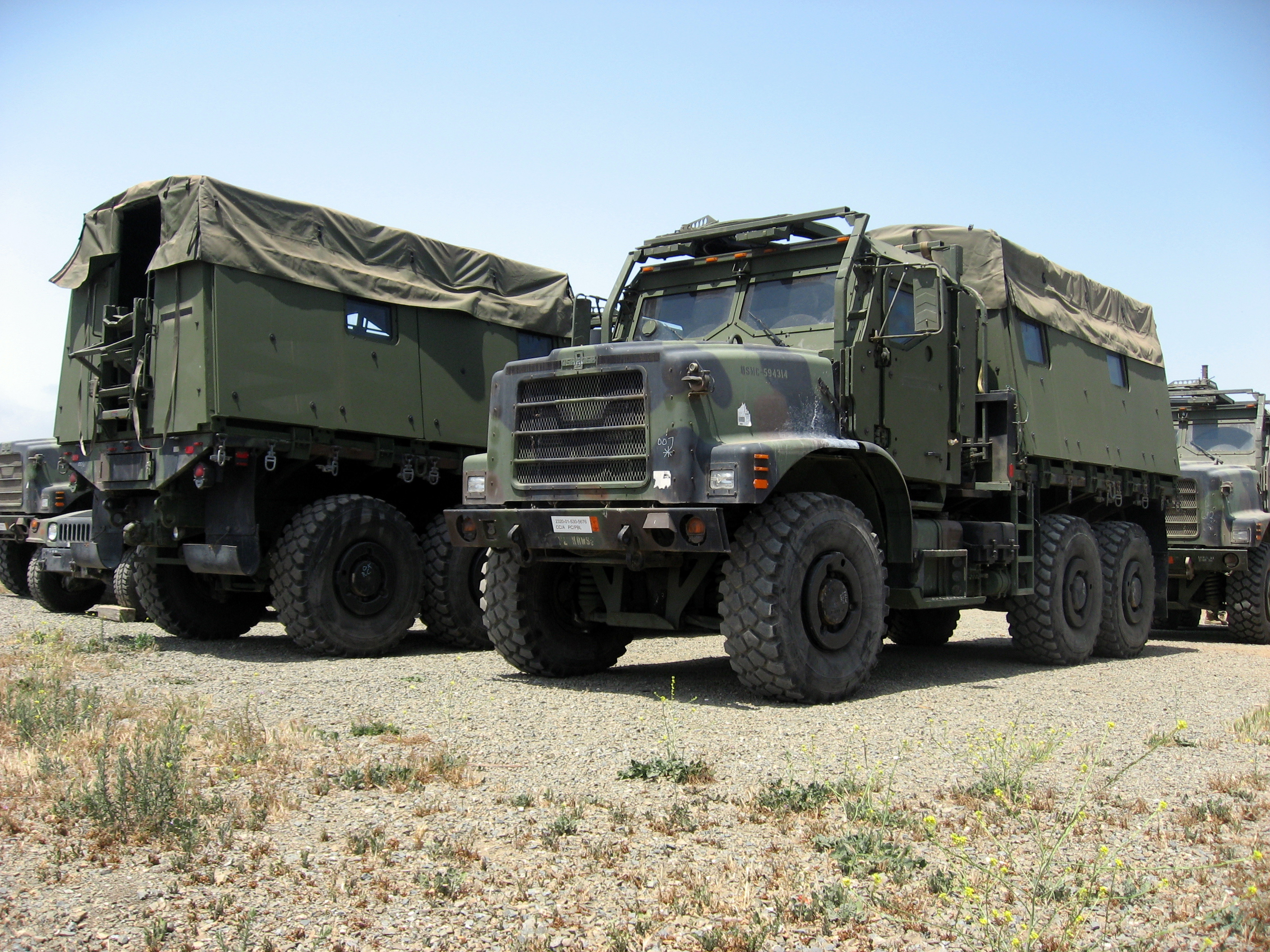
Oshkosh Medium Tactical Vehicle Replacement (MTVR); cab and troop transport body by Plasan

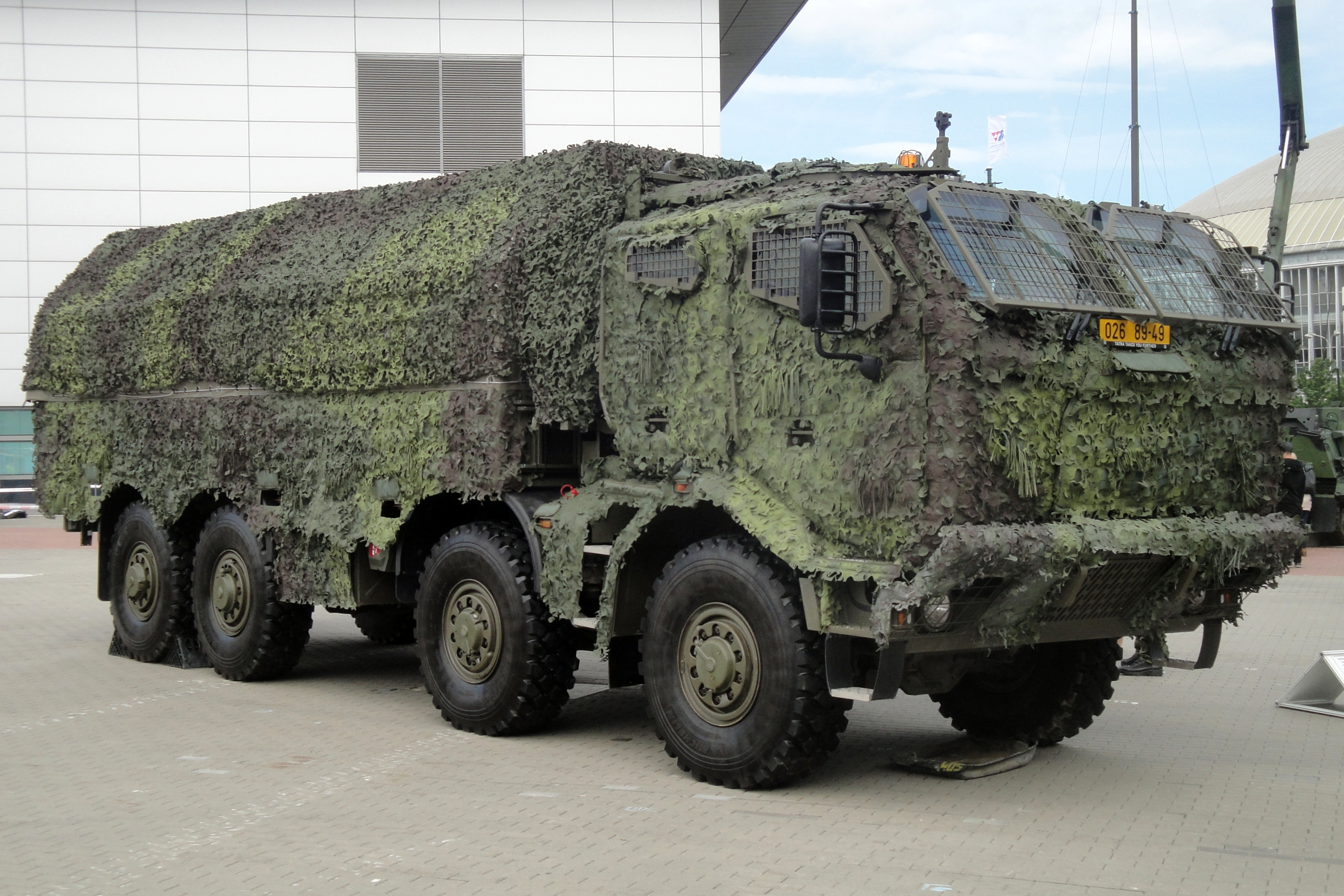
Plasan provides armored cabs for TATRA's T815-7 range of tactical trucks

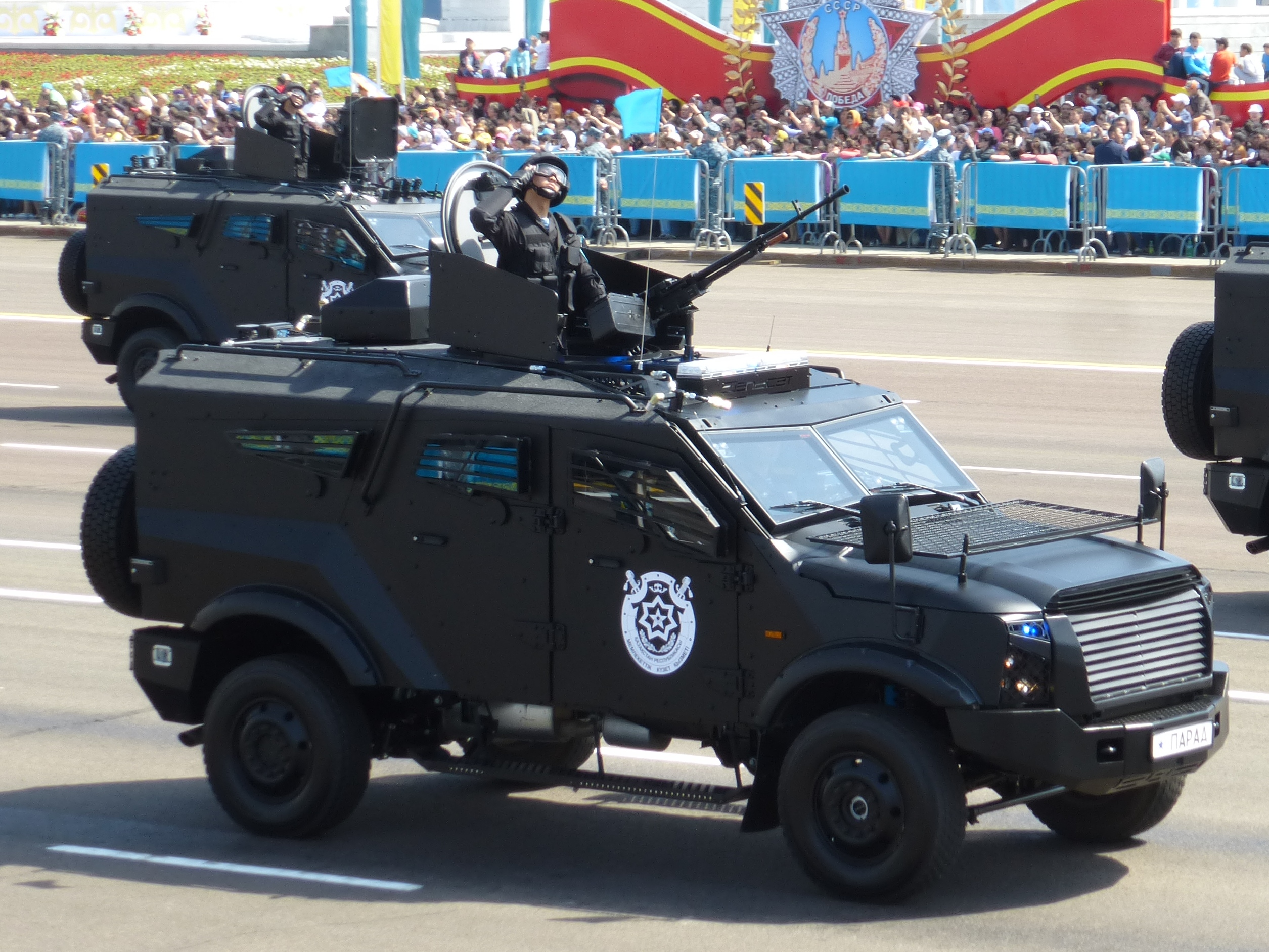
A Kazakh Army 3rd generation SandCat mounting a NSV heavy machine gun

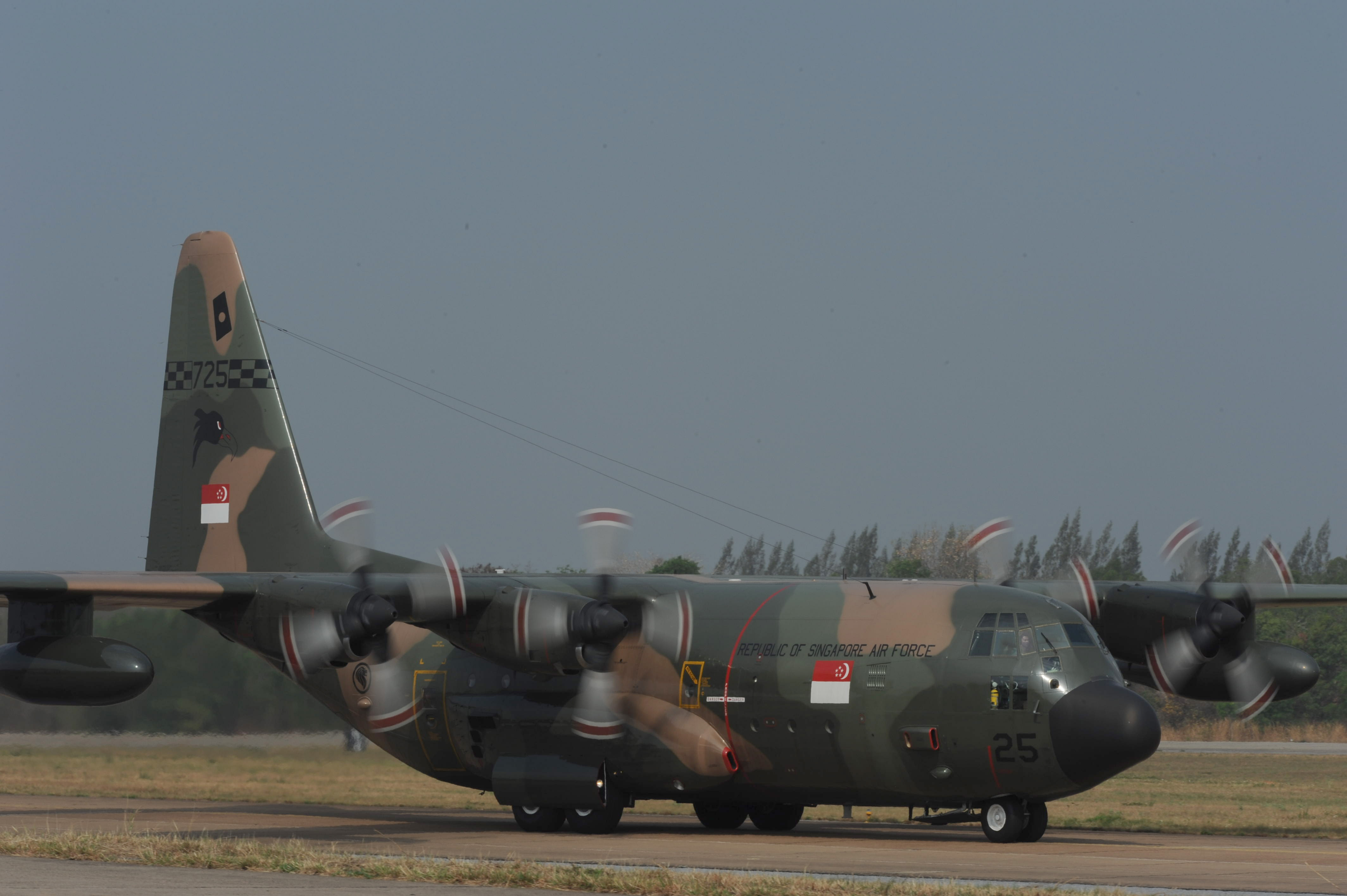
A Singapore air force C-130 Hercules; Plasan provided armor for Singapore air force C-130

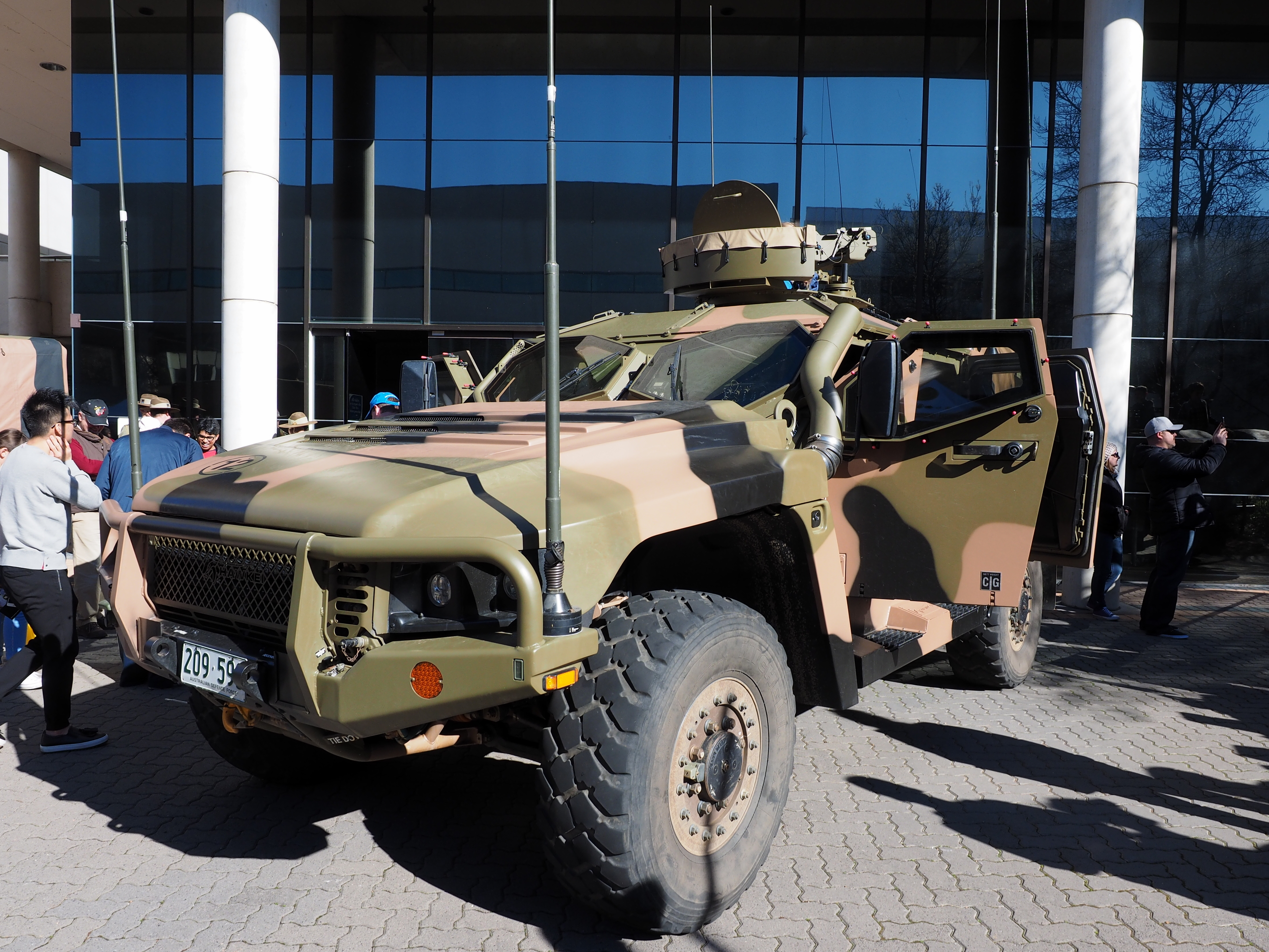
Thales Hawkei; an exponent of Plasan's Kitted Hull

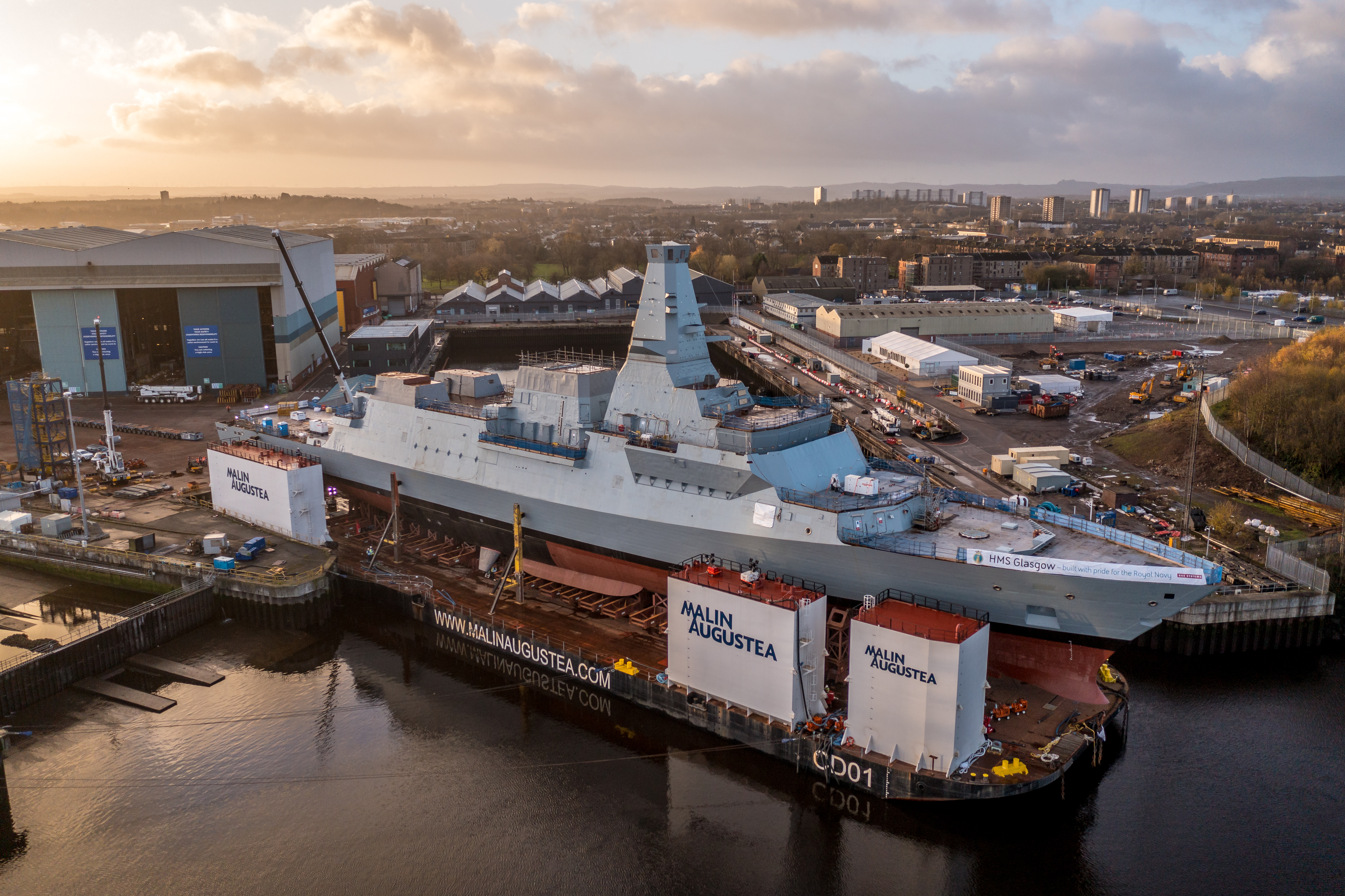
Plasan supplies protection for the Royal Navy's Type 26 frigate, this under different designations also being sold to Australia and Canada

== See also ==
- Economy of Israel
- Science and technology in Israel
