= Plasan Guarder =

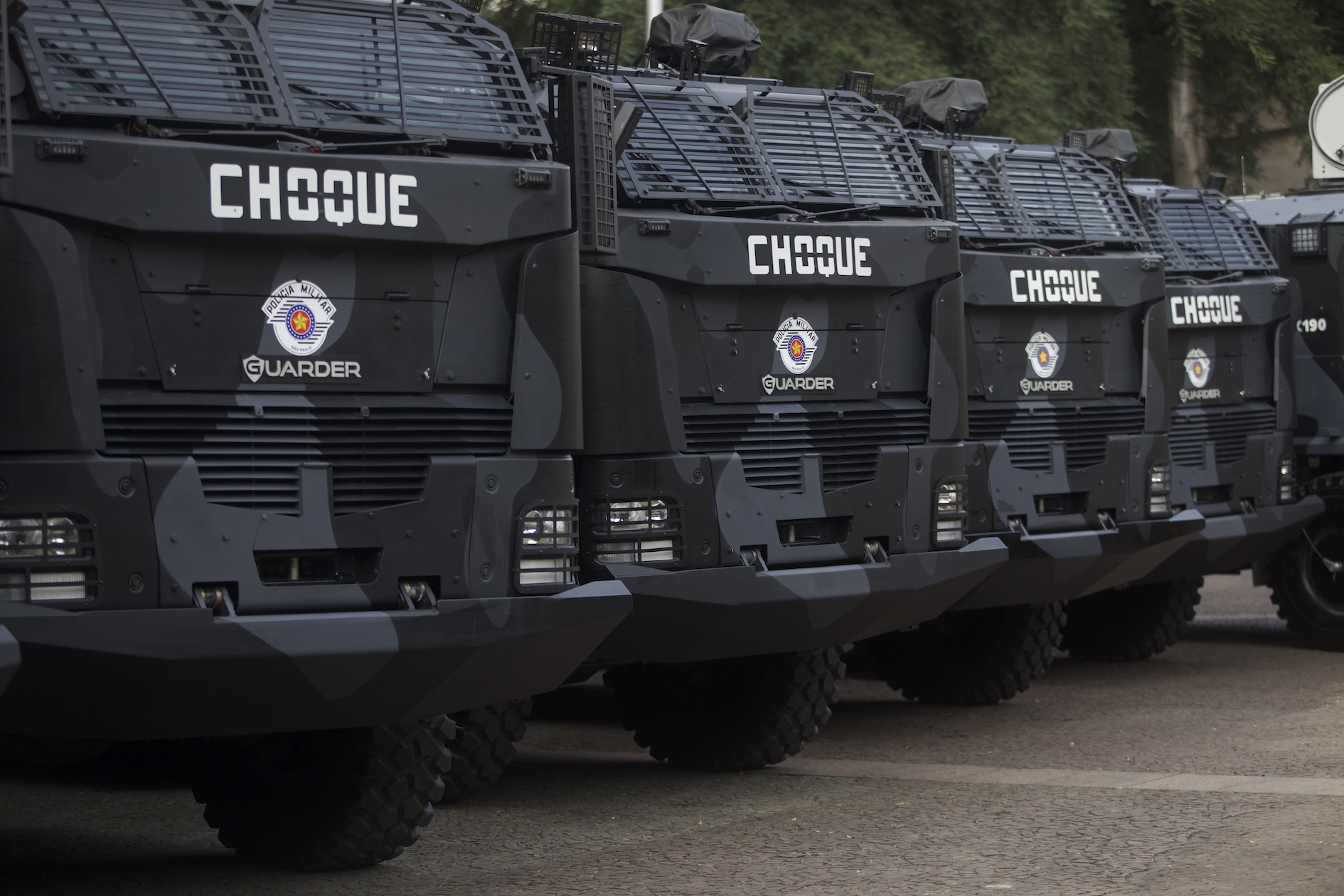
- Type: Armoured vehicle
- Place of origin: Israel

Service history
- Used by: Military Police of São Paulo State

Production history
- Designer: Plasan
- Manufacturer: Plasan
- No. built: 6

Specifications
- Mass: 18 tonnes
- Crew: 2 crew+24 troops
- Engine: engine MAN turbo diesel D2066LFH2-360HR/265 kw Euro5 SCR-1800NM Straight-six engine. Diesel
- Transmission: Five speed automatic

The Plasan Guarder is a composite armored vehicle designed by Plasan of Israel. It is based on a commercial MAN SE 4x4 chassis can carry a payload of up to 3,500 kilograms in a spacious composite-steel hull with STANAG 3 armored protection. The unique vehicle has a combat weight of 22 tons, and curb weight of 18.5 tons. The maximum payload weight of 3,500 kg, fitted with a spacious protected capsule that can be configured to accommodate 22 troops in addition to the two men crew, a command post, medical facility etc. Originally designed for replacement for the Massari Centurion of the Military Police of São Paulo State.

== Design ==
The armored vehicle was adapted for employment in the Civil Disorders Control (CDC) activity, developed by the Second Riot Battalion "Anchieta" and Third Riot Battalion "Humaitá", commercial or specific chassis and 4x4 traction, destined to the transport of 24 equipped police officers (average for operational - of 110 kg and 1, 85m high and operational kits - between 100 and 300 kg of equipment or accessories for collective use) and own armament, body composed of single cabin (front and rear compartment) for transport of crew, driver and crew commander, engine compartment and Glasses.
