= Ultra Network Technologies =

American networking company

Ultra Network Technologies (previously called Ultra Corporation) was an American networking company. It offered high-speed network products for the scientific computing market as well as some commercial companies.

== History ==
It was founded in 1986 by James N. Perdue (formerly of NASA, Ames Research Center), Drew Berding, and Wes Meador (of Control Data Corporation) to provide higher speed connectivity and networking for supercomputers and their peripherals and workstations. At the time, the only other companies offering high speed networking and connectivity for the supercomputer and high-end workstation market was Network Systems Corporation (NSC) and Computer Network Technology Corporation (CNT). They both offered 50 megabytes per second (MB/s) bandwidth between controllers but at that time, their architecture was not implemented using standard networking protocols and their applications were generally focused on supporting connectivity at high speed between large mainframes and peripherals, often only implementing only point-to-point connections. Ethernet was available in 1986 and was used by most computer centers for general networking purposes. Its bandwidth was not high enough to manage the high data rate required by the 100 MB/s supercomputer channels and 4 MB/s VMEbus channels on workstations.

Ultra's first customer, Apple Computer, purchased a system to connect their Cray 1 supercomputer to a high speed graphics framebuffer so that Apple could simulate new personal computers on the Cray Research computer (at the hardware level) and use the framebuffer as the simulated computer display device. Although not a networking application, this first contract allowed Ultra to demonstrate the basic technologies and gave them capital to continue development on a true networking processor.

In 1988, Ultra introduced ISO TP4 (level 4 networking protocol) as part of their controllers and implemented a type of star configuration network using coax and fiber optic connections. They called this product, UltraNet. They later offered a fast version of TCP/IP in their controllers, as this protocol was most frequently encountered in an actual computer center network environment. The clock rates on the Ultra network processors provided 250 Mbit/s transfer rates and four of these could be connected together to achieve one gigabit per second transfer rates for a single logical connection. Effective transfer rates between Silicon Graphics and Sun Microsystems workstations exceeded 4 MB/s using one 250 Mbit/s physical connection, a factor of over 10 to 12 greater than then current Ethernet connections and often exceeded the effective transfer rates of the competing NSC and CNT connections in similar applications. Customers with dual Cray computers measured the connections between Cray processors over the UltraNet that exceeded 80 MB/s effective transfer rates. Ultra Network Technologies products included network cards for workstations and mini-supercomputers using VMEbus connectors and fiber optic cable for the network physical connections, host network cards which resided in the network hub for Cray Supercomputers, IBM mainframes, mini-supercomputers from Convex Computer, HIPPI standard channel, and others. There were two sizes of high speed network hubs that contained the mainframe host cards plus the fiber optic network hub to network hub cards. The network topology was in the form of connected hubs. Engineers at the Stuttgart University computer center demonstrated long distance connections using German PTT provided fiber optics of effective transfer rates over 4 MB/s up to an 800 km distance. Later products incorporated TCP/IP network protocols in their processors.

A typical network configuration of several workstations and a single mainframe host could cost $250,000. A configuration with many workstations and two or three mainframe computers could reach $1 Million.

The company grew to about 140 employees at its high point. Its headquarters was located at 101 Daggett Drive, San Jose, CA with other offices in Dallas, Los Angeles, Seattle, Washington DC, Düsseldorf, Germany, and Paris, France. In 1992, the company was abandoned by its investors and sold due to an inability to become profitable and the advent of less expensive network technologies, mainly created by the advent of the higher speed personal computers and lower cost workstations used in the scientific labs; the buyer was Computer Network Technology Corporation of Plymouth, Minnesota (NASDAQ: CMNT). The company's Chairman of the Board was M. Kenneth Oshman, formally chairman of ROLM Corporation, and President was Stan Tenold, previously the president of ROLM's Military Products division. The company's various customers included many high-end computer centers, including, several NASA sites, NSA, US Air Force, US Navy, Aramco, France's EDF, Pittsburg Supercomputer Center, University of Stuttgart, Leibniz University Hannover, Apple Computer, Houston Chronicle, and many other such high end computer users.

== Citations ==
- "IEEE paper on Ultra Network Technologies technology". doi:10.1109/LCN.1990.128665. S2CID 43448559.
- "CNT buys Ultra Network Technologies". June 22, 1993.
- "NASA Ames Research Center installs Ultra Network Technologies equipment".
- "Pittsburg Supercomputer Center installs Ultra Network Technologies equipment". November 19, 1991.
