= CCTV Building =

CCTV Building may refer to:

- China Media Group Headquarters, the old CCTV headquarters and now served as the headquarters for China Media Group on Fuxing Road, Beijing
- CCTV Headquarters (CMG Office Block at Guanghua Road), the new CCTV headquarters on Guanghua Road, Beijing
