= National Workers' Central (Paraguay) =

CNT
- National Workers' Central
- Central Nacional de Trabajadores
- Founded: 1963
- Headquarters: Asunción, Paraguay
- Location: Paraguay
- Members: 80,000
- Key people: Eduardo Ojeda, secretary general
- Affiliations: ITUC

The National Workers' Central (CNT) is a national trade union center in Paraguay. It was formed in 1963 as the Christian Workers' Central (CCT) and changed its name in 1978.

The CNT is affiliated with the International Trade Union Confederation.
