= Citizens Television =

Citizens Television (CTV) is a public, educational, and government access (PEG) cable TV network based in Hamden, New Haven, and West Haven, Connecticut. Founded in 1991, the network consists of three separate channels available in New Haven, Hamden, and West Haven. According to its website, Citizens Television "exists only because of the First Amendment to the U.S. Constitution. We protect it, and it protects us. All of us!" The station's stated purpose is to encourage its viewers to exercise their legal right to freedom of speech and freedom of expression through CTV. The station is financially supported by viewer donations.

== History ==
In 2013, after a decade in suburban Hamden, CTV moved back to the city center where its original offices had been located. It is now located at 843 State St.

== Channels ==
Citizens Television is broadcast on three specialty Public, educational, and government access cable TV channels, each used for a specific purpose. They include:

- Channel 27 -- CTV's Public-access television channel. Programming on this channel includes submitted programming from residents living in the station's surrounding areas.
- Channel 26 -- CTV's Educational-access television channel. Programming consists of material produced by local educational institutions for the benefit of the community.
- Channel 96 -- CTV's Government-access television (GATV) channel, considered to be Connecticut's version of C-SPAN. Programming consists of coverage of Connecticut's state politics.

== Shows ==
CTV has been a rebroadcaster of shows produced by other stations, including Democracy Now!, Classic Arts Showcase and NASA TV.

=== Mr. Fred's Palette ===
Mr. Fred's Palette is an American public-access art instructional program. It is hosted by local artist Fred Carrion and broadcasts popular music, television, and art. The show is produced and directed by Fred's sons, Chris and Andrew Carrion. Mr. Fred's Palette has won awards from the Alliance for Community Media.

=== Midnight Visitor ===
Midnight Visitor is a late-night public-access horror anthology broadcast. The show combines local New England lore, viewer-submitted paranormal stories, and cult cinema with original comedy sketches and regional music.
