= Cape Town TV =

Community television channel in South Africa

- Type: Television
- Country: South Africa

History
- Launched: September 2008
- Former names: Cape Community Television; Cape Town Community Television Collective (CTCTC)

Links
- Website: www.capetowntv.org

Cape Town TV (also known as CTV) is a community television channel that broadcasts in Cape Town, South Africa. It launched in September 2008 with a one-year, "temporary" license and thereafter won another such license in September 2009. It is a non-profit organisation that is licensed as a community broadcaster in terms of South Africa's Electronic Communications Act.

== Signal transmission and reception ==
CTV is a free-to-air channel that broadcasts on an analogue transmission. The channel transmits from a single low-power transmitter located on Tygerberg hill, to the north of Cape Town. This site provides the widest possible coverage of the Cape Town metropolitan region, although it is only licensed (by ICASA) for low-power transmission. The channel is broadcast on the frequency 607.25 MHz (channel 38) on the UHF band.

Viewers can pick up the channel if they are in line-of-sight of Tygerberg mountain and their television aerials are oriented towards this site. Automatic or manual tuning of the television set should pick up the channel between the signals of SABC3 and eTV.

The signal will vary in strength depending on how far distant the viewer is from the Tygerberg site. In order for the channel to gain a stronger signal and increased coverage of the region, additional transmitters will be needed, some of which will be of a considerably higher power. However, each transmitter is licensed to transmit particular frequencies and there is at present a shortage of available frequency spectrum (in South Africa generally, but particularly in Cape Town). Not only will CTV require considerably more funding to acquire such transmitters, but ICASA will also have to license additional frequencies for the channel. This is unlikely to happen before frequency spectrum is 'freed up' by the migration from analogue to digital television transmission, which was scheduled to be completed in 2012.

== History ==
Cape Town TV (known by the acronym CTV) was founded by community media activists in 2004, following the release of regulations governing the community television sector in South Africa by the broadcasting regulator, ICASA (Independent Communications Authority of South Africa). These activists formed the Cape Town Community Television Collective (CTCTC), which consisted of a grouping of organisations working in the field of community media.

The Collective engaged in a process of ongoing discussions aimed at creating a community television channel for Cape Town, based on principles of social development, democracy, justice and human rights. Consultations were held with other civil society organisations and the wider public, which resulted in the organisation being formally launched at its first annual general meeting (AGM) in September 2006. This was attended by over 100 representatives from civil society organisations in Cape Town.

The organisation first approached the national public service broadcaster, the SABC, for a programming 'window' which would be viewed only in the Western Cape region. This approach was rejected by the SABC and the organisation then decided to stage its own broadcast. Up to this time, the only community TV broadcasts which had been allowed in South Africa were temporary broadcasts of up to four weeks in duration, which were linked to "special event" licenses.

ICASA began issuing longer "temporary" licenses of up to one year in 2007, when it licensed Soweto TV in Johannesburg for a 12-month period in July of that year. Consequently, the CTCTC decided to also pursue a one-year license because this would provide a firmer foundation for a permanent community television channel. Application for such a license was made and this was granted by ICASA in July 2008, although the channel was only able to launch on 1 September 2008.

The channel began broadcasting with one hour of programming, which was repeated throughout the day for a two-week period. Thereafter programme hours were steadily increased until the channel was broadcasting 24 hours per day, although many programmes are repeated due to a shortage of available content. The channel does not have a budget for content acquisition, so all programmes are acquired free of charge from individuals, production houses, organisations and government agencies.

== Operational Model ==
CTV's operational model is based on partnerships with various civil society organisations and tertiary education institutions. The channel is housed at AFDA, the South African School of Motion Picture Medium and Live Performance, located in the suburb of Observatory in Cape Town. AFDA provides CTV with office space, a Final Control Centre room located in the institution's television studio building, access to the production facilities of the television studio and student operators on production equipment. In return, CTV provides AFDA students with on-the-job training and experience in a real broadcast environment, broadcast of student productions and lectures by professional staff.

CTV also has relationships with other tertiary education institutions in the city, including the University of the Western Cape (UWC), the University of Cape Town (UCT), City Varsity and the Cape Peninsula University of Technology (CPUT). These institutions provide production facilities and student operators for certain television productions as well as their own student short films, PSA's (Public Service Advertisements) and documentaries.

The station is run by a non-profit organisation that has other NGOs as its members. The membership base includes organisations in the fields of labour, education, sport, arts & culture and other development-oriented community organisations. Membership is currently free of charge.

== Programming ==
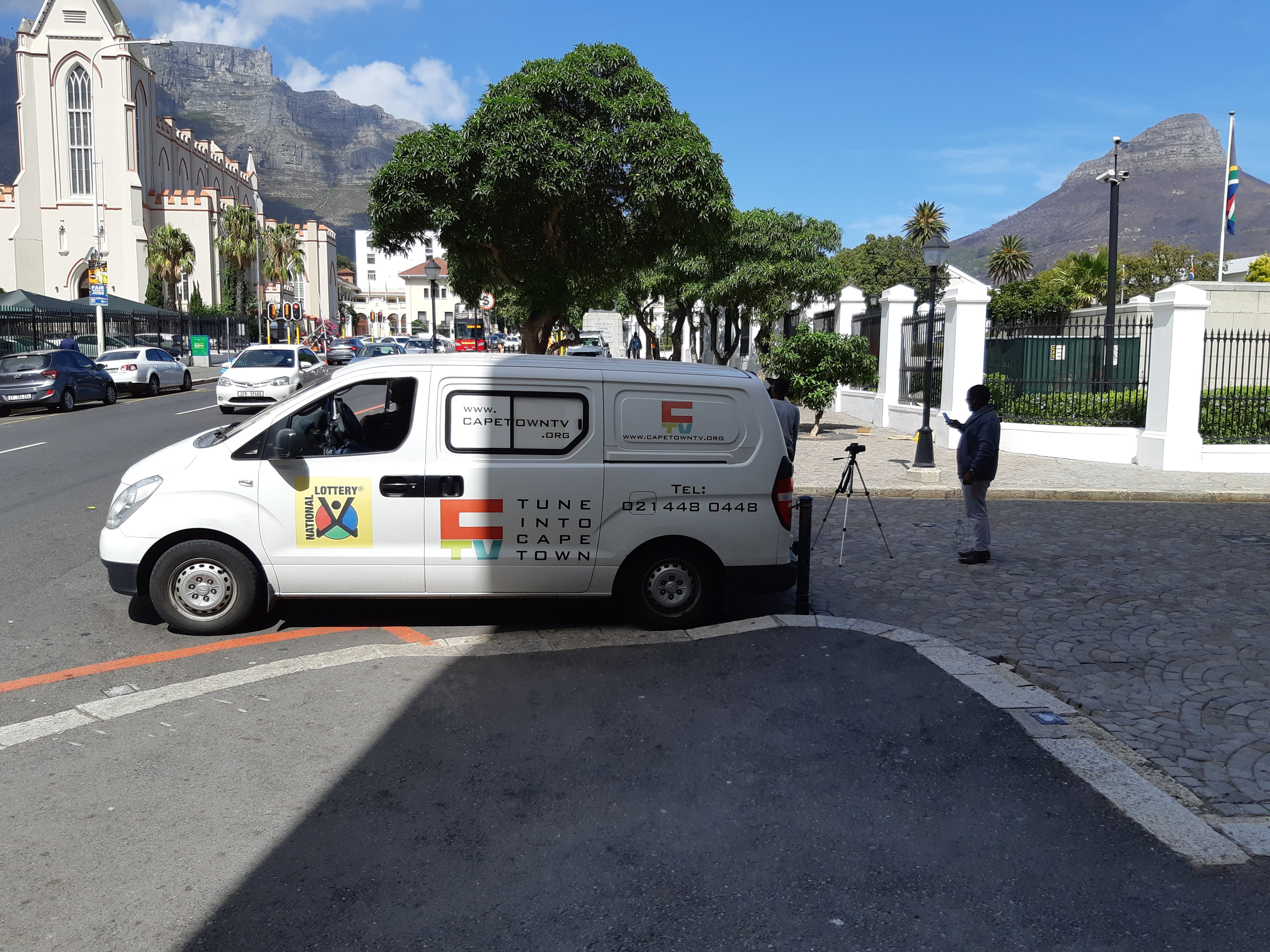
A news van owned by Cape Town TV outside the South African Parliament building.

CTV has a range of programming that includes content that is acquired from various sources (such as independent producers, community members, production houses, organisations, educational institutions and government agencies) and programmes that are produced either 'in-house' or by programme partners using studio facilities located at AFDA, UWC or UCT.

Programmes are mainly of a documentary nature, covering topics such as NGOs, health, spirituality, religion, human rights, democracy, environment and world affairs. The channel has made a name for itself by broadcasting programmes that would never be shown on conventional television stations. These include controversial issues such as 'conspiracy theories' (e.g. Illuminati, the 9-11 attacks, etc.), animal rights/anti-cruelty, UFOs, the Mayan Calendar and socialism.

Other content includes short films, music programmes, talk shows, actuality programmes and lectures. CTV produces a limited number of programmes 'in-house'; these are mainly studio-based talk shows that have included a current affairs show called Currents and a public access show called Open Studio where members of the public and some radio DJs can host their own talk shows. CTV now has an 'arts desk' which produces short videos on arts, cultural and sports events in the city. Some programmes, such as Currents and the arts desk have a training component, where young people from disadvantaged backgrounds are mentored in video production and video journalism skills.

Programme partners include the Community Media Trust (CMT) which produces the HIV/AIDS awareness show Siyayinqoba: Beat It! and Workers World Media Productions, which produces The Labour Show. Other local content providers produce shows including What's On in Cape Town (local events), Street Talk (topical issues) Talent in Action (amateur performers), Talk Dini and The Friday Sermon (Muslim religious issues). As of 2011, CTV broadcast Girls Talk TV, a US-based network of 4 cable TV shows geared towards the empowerment of young women.

CTV has done a number of live broadcasts from the AFDA studio. The first of these was the station's official launch party in April 2009, episodes of Siyayinqoba: Beat It! and a fundraising telethon with local entertainers and celebrities in September 2009.

CTV includes the Keiser Report, Breaking the Set with Abby Martin, Documentaries from RT and Al Jazeera (English) international news in its programming line-up. Al Jazeera is located in Doha and provides an alternative viewpoint on global events, with in-depth news and current affairs coverage. CTV re-broadcasts Al Jazeera live from 13H00-14H00 in the afternoons and from 20H00-21H00 in the evenings.

In September 2021, CTV launched a video-on-demand platform with six content channels, making the station’s programming available on digital devices.

== Challenges ==
CTV, like other community television stations in South Africa, has faced a number of challenges. These include funding, availability of broadcast frequencies and the migration from analogue to digital broadcasting.

In October 2009 CTV was taken off air for ten days by the national signal provider, Sentech, due to cash flow difficulties that prevented it from maintaining payments for signal distribution. Consequently, the channel embarked on a programme of action aimed at either reducing the fees charged by Sentech to community broadcasters, or incepting a government subsidy for these costs.

This programme of action resulted in a public march on Parliament in November 2009, where the station presented a list of demands to the South African government. These demands included the following:

1. That CTV is not switched off when ICASA licenses a new cell phone TV operator next year but that a frequency is allocated to carry the channel.
2. The creation of an interim support fund for existing community TV stations, in addition to the speedy implementation of the Public Broadcasting Fund.
3. That Sentech provides CTV with a good quality signal and transmission for free or at a significantly reduced rate.
4. That community TV is protected during and after the migration to digital terrestrial television.

The process of migration from analogue to digital television broadcasting that happened in South Africa posed a significant threat to the channel. The frequency that CTV was allocated for broadcasting by ICASA had been earmarked for mobile broadcasting, i.e. digital broadcasting to cell phones.

Consequently, the channel challenged ICASA to provide an alternative frequency; the alternative would be for the channel to migrate to a digital broadcasting multiplex, but since very few people in South Africa would have the necessary equipment to receive such a signal prior to the switch-off of all analogue television broadcasting (planned for 2012), it meant that the station would lose its audience and hence would be unsustainable. ICASA stated that it would address this issue once it finalized digital broadcasting regulations.
