= CCTV (disambiguation) =

CCTV, or closed-circuit television, is a video camera system with a limited set of receivers.

CCTV may also refer to:

- China Central Television, the national television broadcaster of the People's Republic of China
  - CCTV-4
  - CCTV-9
  - CCTV-13
- Cork Community TV, a television channel in Ireland
- Cambridge Community Television, a public access television service in Cambridge, Massachusetts, United States

== See also ==
- CC (disambiguation)
- CCT (disambiguation)
