= Combat Tactical Vehicle (Technology Demonstrator) =

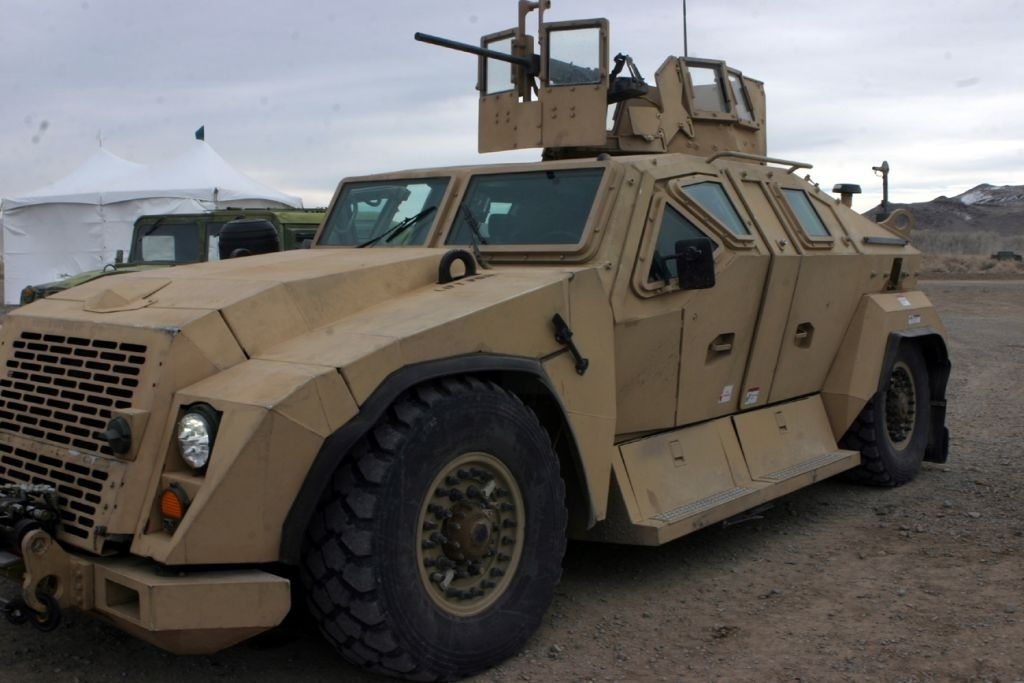
The CTV outside Carson City, Nevada

The Combat Tactical Vehicle (Technology Demonstrator) was a testbed vehicle built by the Nevada Automotive Test Center (NATC), for the Joint Light Tactical Vehicle's Combat Tactical Vehicle (CTV), under contract for the Office of Naval Research (ONR). The United States Marine Corps tested and evaluated the vehicle at the NATC proving ground in Nevada for cross country mobility. Also included was ballistic testing of several armor solutions.

The vehicle demonstrated several new technologies, such as a fully adjustable front and rear suspension, with 21in wheel travel. The chassis and basic armor were made from aluminum by BAE Systems. The aluminum armor offered high level protection, concentrated throughout the lower hull. A B kit armor package, designed by Plasan, could be fit to protect the higher portions of the cabin. The B kit armor used a combination of composites and ceramics attached to sockets embedded in the basic vehicle. Blast deflecting structures and seats were used to protect against mine and blast effects.

The engine was a Detroit Diesel/MTU Friedrichshafen 926 turbo-diesel with 322 hp (240 kW) and 959 lb⋅ft (1,300 N⋅m) torque. There was optional rear wheel steering, along with a central tire inflation system and VFI runflat tires. It was capable of fording water at depth of 30" (60" with preparation). It featured an electronically controlled braking (ABS) system and electronic stability control (ECS). There was 30 kW onboard electrical power and 10 kW mobile power.
